= Shayne Ward discography =

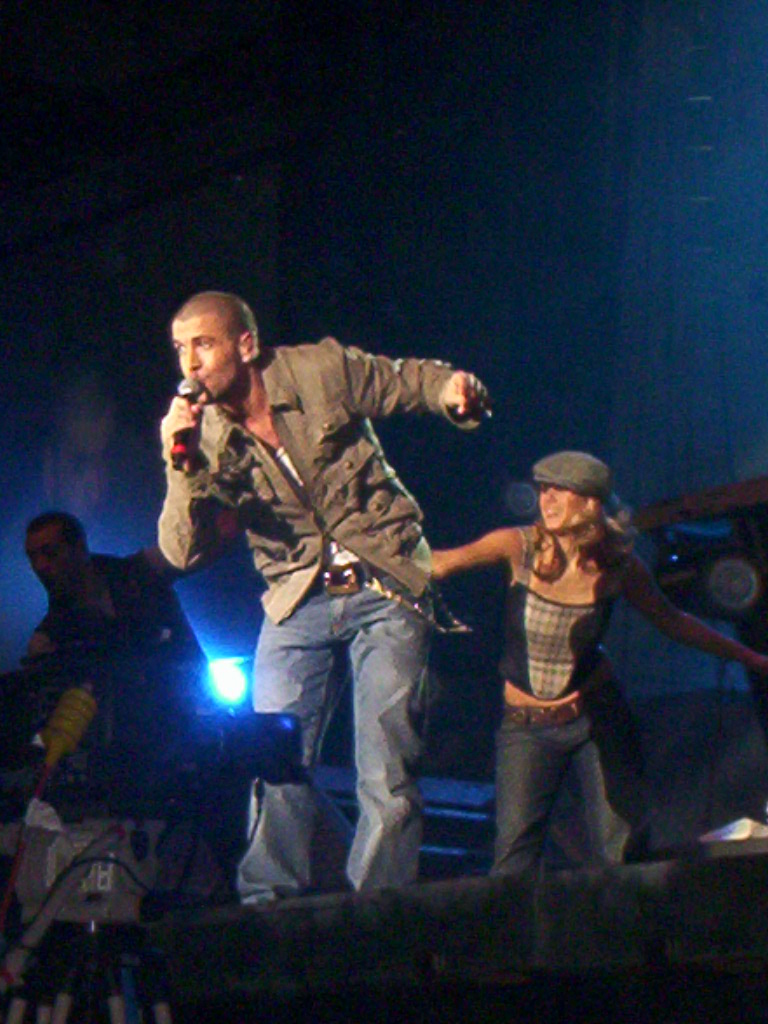
- Ward performing during the Shayne Ward Live 2007 tour.
- Studio albums: 4
- Singles: 17
- Music videos: 10

English pop singer Shayne Ward has released four studio albums and seventeen singles, which includes two singles as a featured artist.

Shayne Ward, Ward's debut studio album, was released in April 2006, and peaked at No. 1 on the UK Albums Chart. Immediately after his victory on The X Factor, Ward signed a recording contract with Syco Music and his first single, "That's My Goal", was released in the UK on 21 December 2005. It became the Christmas number one single of 2005. Ward's second single, "No Promises", a cover of a Bryan Rice song was released on 10 April 2006, and peaked at No. 2 on the UK Singles Chart. Ward's third single "Stand by Me" peaked at No. 14 on the UK Singles Chart.

Breathless, Ward's second studio album was released in November 2007, the album peaked to No. 2 on the UK Albums Chart. "If That's OK with You" was given a release date of 20 August 2007, but was then delayed and became a double A-side single with "No U Hang Up". It was finally released on 24 September 2007, and peaked at No. 2 on the UK Singles Chart. "Breathless" was released on 19 November 2007 as the second single and peaked at No. 6 on the UK Singles Chart.

Obsession, Ward's third studio album was released in November 2010, the album peaked at No. 15 on the UK Albums Chart. The first single from the album is a cover version of Nickelback's 2008 single, "Gotta Be Somebody". It was released on 7 November 2010 and peaked at number 12 on the UK Singles Chart.

Closer, Ward's fourth studio album was released in April 2015. "My Heart Would Take You Back" was released as the lead single from the album on 12 April 2015.

== Albums ==
=== Studio albums ===
Title	Details	Peak chart positions				Sales	Certifications
Title	Details	UK	DEN	IRE	SWE	Sales	Certifications
Shayne Ward	Released: 17 April 2006; Label: Syco; Formats: CD, digital download	1	—	1	8	UK: 538,918	BPI: Platinum; IRMA: 4× Platinum
Breathless	Released: 26 November 2007; Label: Syco; Formats: CD, digital download	2	39	1	—	UK: 450,000	BPI: Platinum; IRMA: 5× Platinum
Obsession	Released: 15 November 2010; Label: Syco; Formats: CD, digital download	15	—	11	—		BPI: Silver
Closer	Released: 12 April 2015; Label: MPG; Formats: CD, digital download	17	—	16	—		
"—" denotes a recording that did not chart or was not released in that territory.

=== Box set ===
Title	Details
Anthology	Scheduled: 9 December 2022; Formats: 3×CD

== Singles ==
=== As lead artist ===
Year	Title	Peak chart positions					Certifications	Album
Year	Title	UK	DEN	IRE	NOR	SWE	Certifications	Album
2005	"That's My Goal"	1	—	1	—	58	BPI: 2× Platinum	Shayne Ward
2006	"No Promises"	2	—	1	13	4	BPI: Silver	Shayne Ward
2006	"Stand by Me"	14	—	9	—	—		Shayne Ward
2007	"If That's OK with You"	2 (Note: "If That's OK With You" also charted separately at number 72 in the UK in December 2007 due to strong digital downloads.)	—	1	—	45	BPI: Silver	Breathless
2007	"No U Hang Up"	2	4	11	38	38	BPI: Silver; IFPI DEN: Gold	Breathless
2007	"Breathless"	6	—	2	—	—	BPI: Silver	Breathless
2010	"Gotta Be Somebody"	12	—	10	—	—		Obsession
2011	"Obsession"	97	—	—	—	—		Obsession
2015	"My Heart Would Take You Back"	166	—	—	—	—		Closer
2015	"The Way You Were"	—	—	—	—	—		Closer
2015	"Moving Target"	—	—	—	—	—		Closer
2018	"A Different Corner"	—	—	—	—	—		Non-album singles
2020	"Over the Rainbow"	— (Note: "Over the Rainbow" did not enter the Official Singles Chart, but peaked at number six on the Official Singles Sales Chart, which counts only paid-for sales in the UK.)	—	—	—	—		Non-album singles
2021	"Crazy in Love"	—	—	—	—	—		Non-album singles
2025	"Through The Night"	—	—	—	—	—		Non-album singles
"—" denotes a recording that did not chart or was not released in that territory.

=== As featured artist ===
Year	Title	Peak chart positions	Album
Year	Title	UK	Album
2011	"Must Be a Reason Why" (J. Pearl featuring Shayne Ward)	—	Obsession
2021	"Coming Home" (Sash! featuring Shayne Ward)	— (Note: "Coming Home" did not enter the Official Singles Chart, but peaked at number ninety-five on the Official Singles Downloads Chart.)	TBA
"—" denotes a recording that did not chart or was not released in that territory.

=== Promotional singles ===
Year	Title	Album
2013	"Galway Girl" / "One Little Christmas Tree" (Foster and Allen with Shayne Ward)	Non-album single
2014	"Falling Slowly" (Louise Dearman & Shayne Ward)	Once
