= The X Factor (British TV series) series 4 =

British TV series

The X Factor
- Series 4
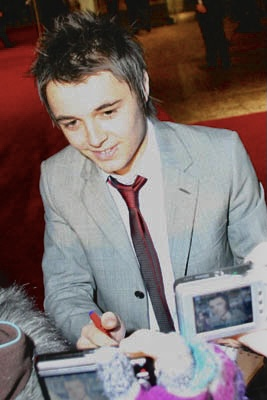
- Jackson at the premiere of The Golden Compass
- Hosted by: Dermot O'Leary (ITV); Fearne Cotton (ITV2)
- Judges: Simon Cowell; Dannii Minogue; Sharon Osbourne; Louis Walsh; Brian Friedman (London auditions)
- Winner: Leon Jackson
- Winning mentor: Dannii Minogue
- Runner-up: Rhydian Roberts

Release
- Original network: ITV; ITV2 (The Xtra Factor)
- Original release: 18 August – 15 December 2007

Series chronology
- ← Previous; Series 3 Next → Series 5

The X Factor is a British television music competition to find new singing talent. The fourth series was broadcast on ITV from 18 August 2007 and was won by Leon Jackson on 15 December 2007, with Rhydian Roberts finishing as the runner-up and Dannii Minogue emerging as the winning mentor. Dermot O'Leary presented for the first time, replacing Kate Thornton, who had been presenting the show since series 1 in 2004. Fearne Cotton replaced Ben Shephard as presenter on the spin-off show The Xtra Factor. The original judging panel consisted of Simon Cowell, Minogue, Sharon Osbourne and Brian Friedman. Friedman left the panel halfway through the first audition episode and was replaced by former judge Louis Walsh.

This series saw a number of changes to the format, most notably the lowering of the minimum age for participants from 16 to 14 and the increase in the number of categories from three to four, resulting from the division of the 16-24s category into separate male and female categories.

Jackson's prize as winner was a £1 million recording contract. His first single release was "When You Believe", arranged for the finalists by composer Stephen Schwartz and released to download on 16 December 2007, with the physical format following on 19 December. The single became that year's Christmas number one on the UK Singles Chart and was also the fourth best selling single of 2007. This series was the first to be sponsored by The Carphone Warehouse after being sponsored by Nokia since the first series.

== Judges, Presenters and Other Personnel ==
Judges and Presenter(s) for The X Factor Series 4

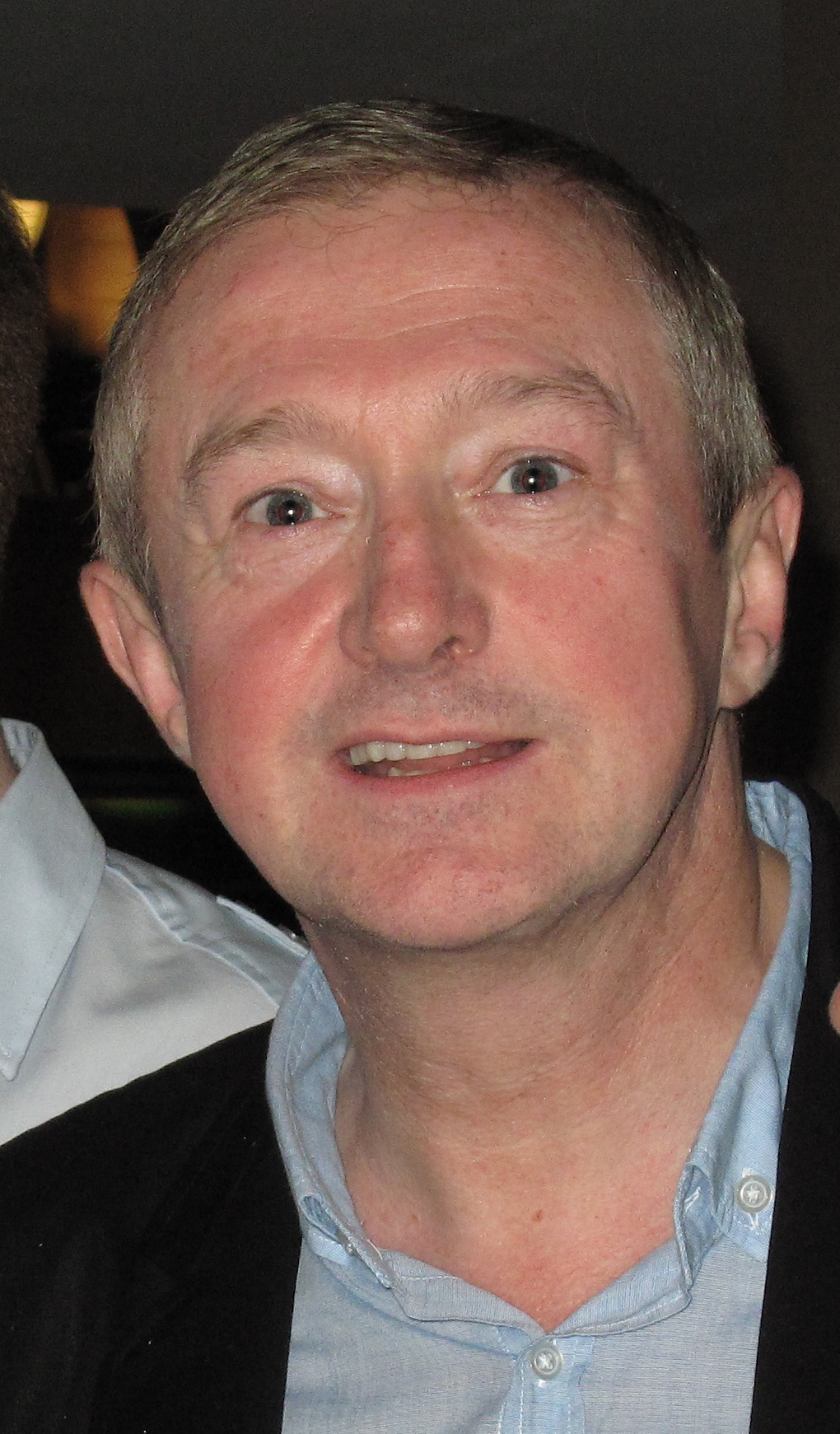
Louis Walsh

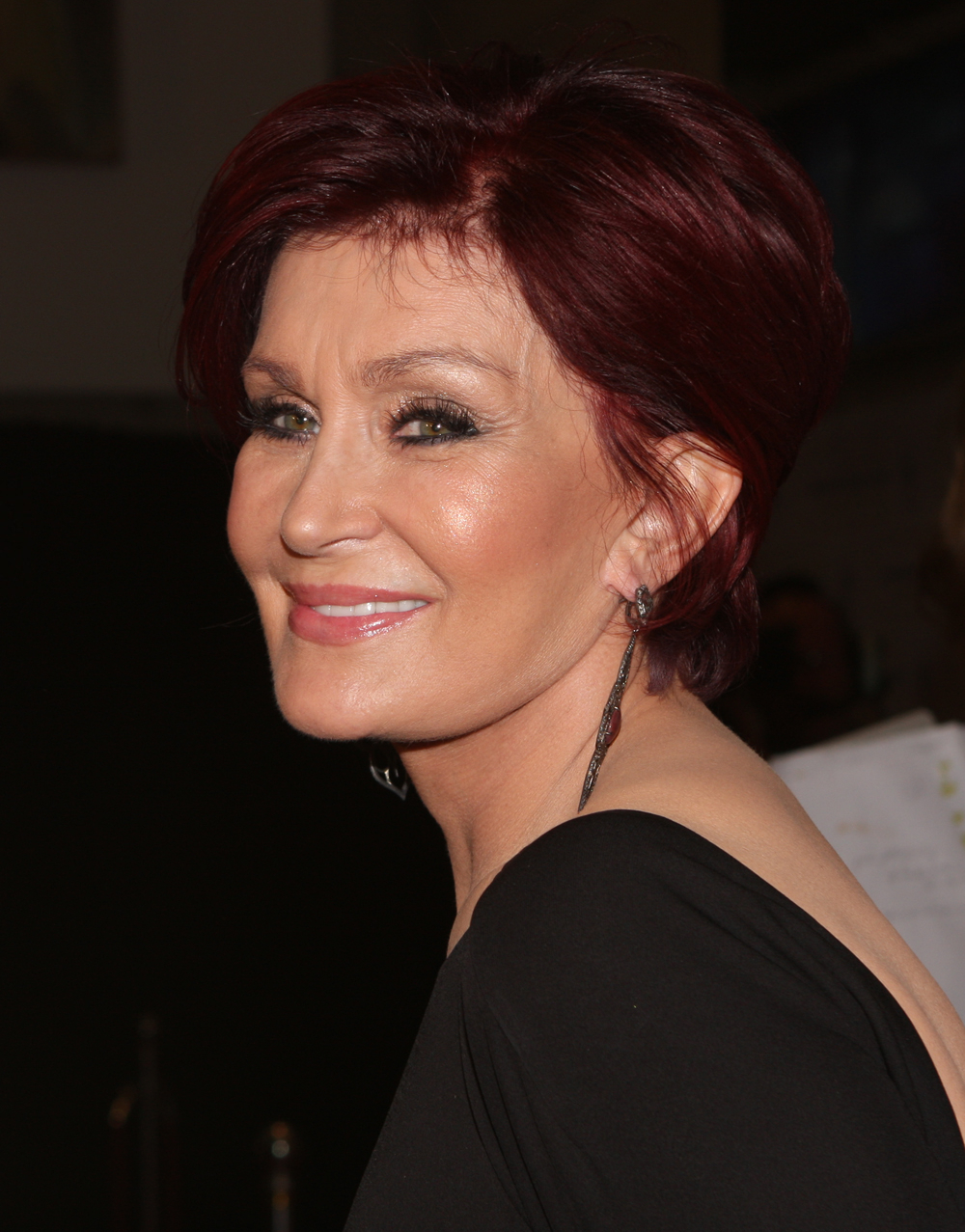
Sharon Osbourne

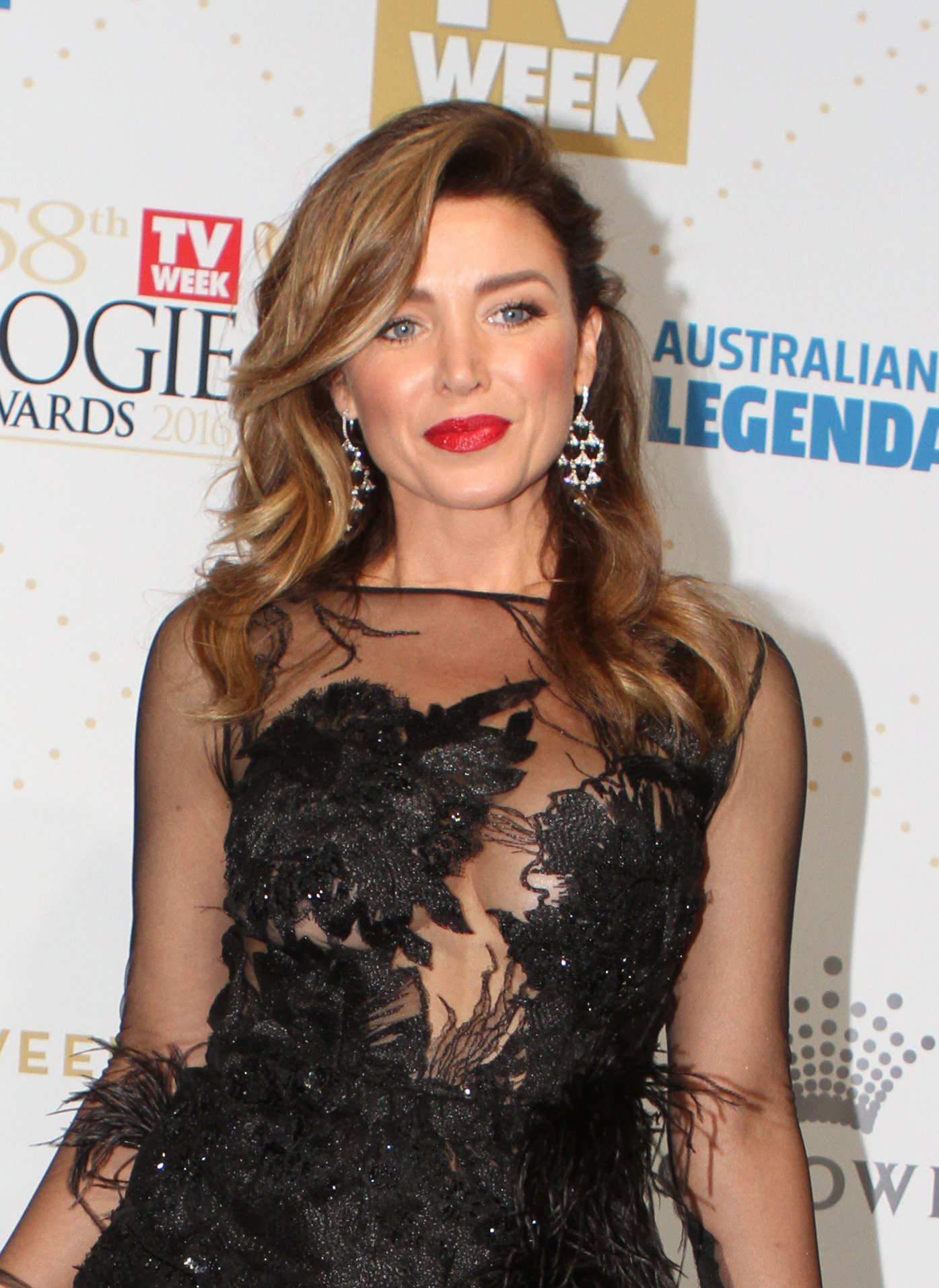
Dannii Minogue

Simon Cowell

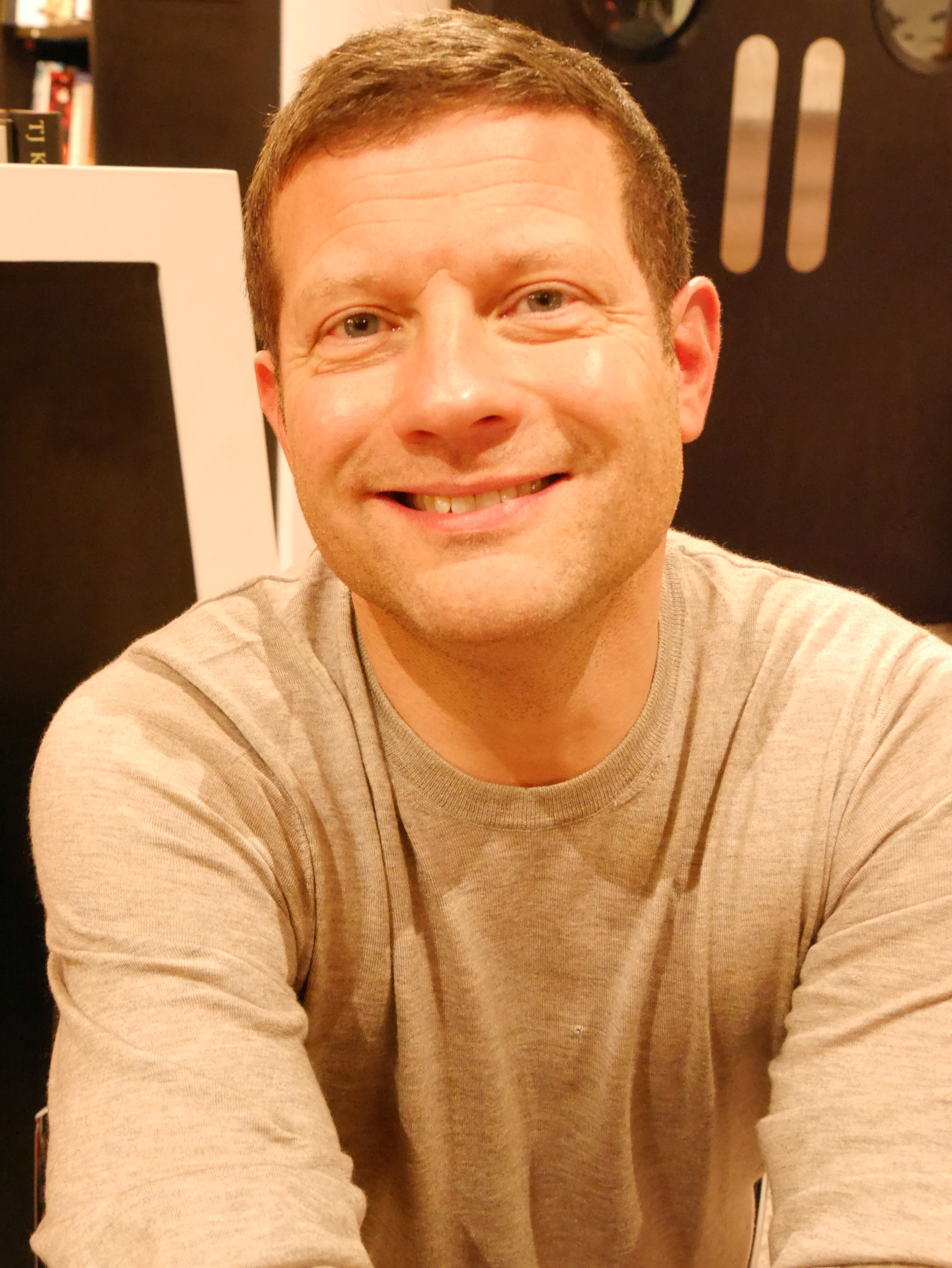
Dermot O'Leary (ITV1)

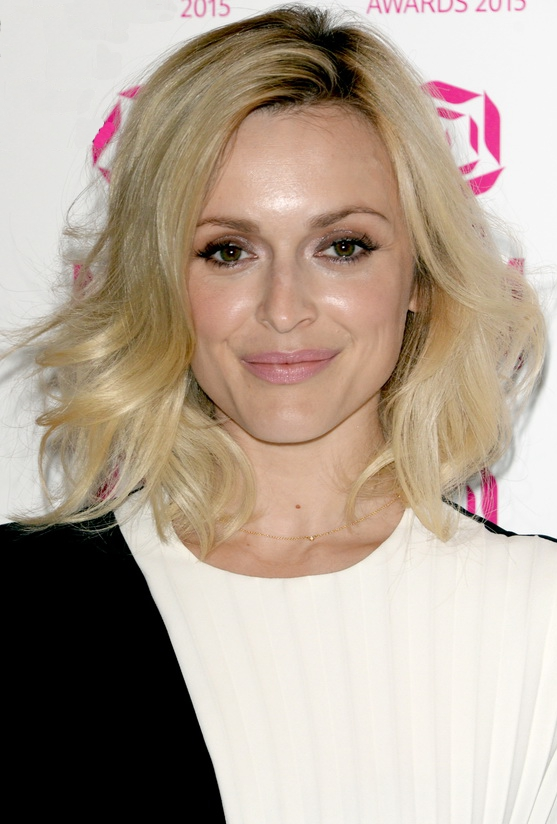
Fearne Cotton (ITV2)

On 8 March 2007, it was announced that judge Louis Walsh, who had appeared in all three previous series would be stepping back from his judging role but would continue to manage the acts after the show. This, along with the additional category, created vacancies for two new judges to join the original panel of Sharon Osbourne and Simon Cowell. Walsh was replaced by American choreographer Brian Friedman, who was hired after impressing Cowell on his show Grease Is the Word. A fourth judge was also brought in: Australian singer, actress and Australia's Got Talent judge Dannii Minogue. Cowell hired Minogue after viewing tapes of her judging on Australia's Got Talent, and because of her 30 years experience as a singer and performer.

On 22 June, it was announced that Friedman had stepped down as a judge and would be replaced by Walsh. Friedman remained on the show as a performance coach and choreographer, billed on screen as "Creative Director". Suggestions that Walsh's firing and rehiring was concocted to generate publicity were denied. Commenting on Friedman's replacement by Walsh, Osbourne said that there was no "chemistry" within the original judging line-up, and that the atmosphere was "very uncomfortable". Cowell stated that the atmosphere was "very weird". For his part, Friedman said he felt "incredibly let down with the British talent".

Following the departure of series 1–3 presenter Kate Thornton, Dermot O'Leary took over as presenter for series 4. In an interview with ITV Head of Entertainment and Comedy, Paul Jackson, O'Leary said he was still getting used to handling the rejected at the auditions: "I'm still trying to work it out. It's an emotionally exhausting show to do." On 2 May 2007, it was announced that Ben Shephard had quit his role as presenter of spin-off show The Xtra Factor on ITV2. An X Factor insider said: "Ben had a big chance of being the main presenter on X Factor until he did Soapstar Superstar last year on ITV1. He didn't impress some of the X Factor bosses on that live show and moved down the pecking order." Cowell said: "I wish Ben good luck. He has done a great job on The Xtra Factor." Shephard later signed up to front DanceX, a BBC One series hunting for a modern-day version of '70s dance outfit Hot Gossip. He was replaced by Top of the Pops presenter and BBC Radio 1 DJ Fearne Cotton. Osbourne left after this series and Cheryl Cole replaced her in series 5.

== Selection process ==
Cities that auditions were held in.

=== Auditions ===
Initial auditions with producers took place in April and May 2007, with callbacks in front of the judges in June. The number of applicants reached an all-time high with 150,000 people auditioning in the cities of London (Wembley Stadium, 4–7 June), Manchester (25–28 June), Belfast (6 July), Cardiff (Angel Hotel, Cardiff, 10–11 July), Sheffield (Sheffield City Hall, 15 July), Birmingham (The ICC, 18–20 July) and Glasgow (Crowne Plaza Glasgow). Eight thousand people attended an open audition at Emirates Stadium (home of Arsenal F.C.), London, on 9 June 2007. Due to the record number of applications an additional open audition was held at Birmingham Alexander Stadium in Birmingham on 21 July 2007.

Auditionees needed a minimum of three "yes" votes (previously two) from the judges to proceed to the next round. Walsh missed the London auditions due to being sacked at the time, but returned to the judging panel from the Manchester auditions onwards after Friedman stepped down. Osbourne was absent from some of the auditions in Birmingham due to filming commitments with America's Got Talent, so the auditions went ahead with just Cowell, Walsh and Minogue as judges.

The first episode aired on 18 August, and featured auditions from London, Manchester and Birmingham. 25 August episode featured auditions from Birmingham, Manchester and Cardiff. The third episode premiered on 1 September, and featured auditions from Glasgow, Birmingham and Cardiff. The Belfast auditions, along with those from Birmingham and Manchester, were featured on 8 September. The fifth episode aired on 15 September, and featured auditions from Sheffield, Birmingham and Manchester. The final audition episode aired on 22 September, and featured auditions from Manchester, Birmingham and Cardiff.

Summary of auditions
City	Date(s)	Venue	Judges
London	4-7 June 2007	Wembley Stadium	Brian Friedman; Sharon Osbourne; Dannii Minogue; Simon Cowell
Manchester	25–28 June 2007	Old Trafford	Louis Walsh; Sharon Osbourne; Dannii Minogue; Simon Cowell
Belfast	6 July 2007		Louis Walsh; Sharon Osbourne; Dannii Minogue; Simon Cowell
Cardiff	10–11 July 2007	Angel Hotel, Cardiff	Louis Walsh; Sharon Osbourne; Dannii Minogue; Simon Cowell
Sheffield	15 July 2007	Sheffield City Hall	Louis Walsh; Sharon Osbourne; Dannii Minogue; Simon Cowell
Birmingham	18–21 July 2007	The ICC	Louis Walsh; Sharon Osbourne; Dannii Minogue; Simon Cowell

=== Bootcamp ===
This series saw all four judges work together at the bootcamp, rather than disband to manage their own categories as happened in previous series. Bootcamp was broadcast over a two-part show on Saturday 29 September. Episode 7 showed the first round at the Heythrop Park Hotel in Oxfordshire, where the acts were whittled down to 12 in each category (48 acts in total). Midway through the first round, Walsh persuaded the other judges to bring back some rejected soloists from the Boys and Girls categories to form new groups, despite Cowell's reluctance as it had never been done before on the show and he felt that it would not work. The judges then selected nine girls and eight boys to form new groups and re-audition for them the next day. The new groups formed were five-piece boyband Futureproof and six-piece girl group Hope (reduced to five after judges' houses). The next episode, showing the second round at the Apollo Theatre in London, was screened a few hours later. Here the acts were further reduced to six in each category – a total of 24 acts. After this, the judges were told which category they were to mentor. Minogue was given the Boys, Cowell was given the Groups, Osbourne was given the Girls and Walsh was given the Over 25s.

Bootcamp Themes for the first task

- Boys: Perform a song that they would release as their first single
- Girls: Perform a song that either reflects the happiest or saddest time in their lives.
- Over 25s: Perform a song that relates to an younger audience
- Groups: Perform a song by famous pop groups

Second Task Songs per Category

Boys:

- "Let It Be"
- "Home"
- "If You're Not the One"
- "Hero"
- "I Can't Make You Love Me"
- "When I Fall in Love"

Girls:

- "Wishing on a Star"
- "Sorry Seems to Be the Hardest Word"
- "Beautiful"
- "Don't Speak"
- "Torn"
- "I'm Not a Girl, Not Yet a Woman"
- "I Don't Want to Talk About It"
- "One Moment in Time"

Groups:

- "I Want You Back"
- "I’ll Stand by You"
- "Ain't No Mountain High Enough"
- "You've Got a Friend"
- "Could It Be Magic"

Over 25s

- "Chasing Cars"
- "You're Beautiful"
- "Let There Be Love"
- "Your Song"
- "Father and Son"

=== Judges' houses ===
In the "judges' houses" round, each judge chose three of their remaining six acts to go forward and represent them on the live shows. The locations for the round were confirmed during episode 8 on 29 September; they were later revealed by Louis Walsh not to be the judges' real homes. Cowell took his six acts to Marbella; Osbourne to Los Angeles; Walsh to Dublin; and Minogue to Ibiza. As in previous series, the judges were joined by an assistant to help them make their decisions: Minogue by songwriter and producer Terry Ronald; Cowell was joined by former pop star Sinitta; Osbourne by The Pussycat Dolls lead singer Nicole Scherzinger; Walsh by Westlife singer Kian Egan.

The judges' houses stage was broadcast over a two-part weekend special. Episode 9 was shown on Saturday 6 October where all 24 acts performed for a place in their mentor's top three and, subsequently, the live shows. The top twelve were revealed the day after on Sunday 7 October in a special Sunday episode. This is notable because at that time it was known as the first Sunday episode to be aired in X Factor history (excluding The X Factor: Battle of the Stars which aired over eight consecutive nights over a week)

Judges Houses Performances

- Act in bold advanced

Boys:

- **Andy: "Sorry Seems to Be the Hardest Word"**
- Dominic: "I'll Be There"
- **Leon: "I Still Haven't Found What I'm Looking For"**
- Charlie: "Patience"
- **Rhydian: "Somebody to Love"**
- Luke: "Mandy"

Groups:

- **Same Difference: "Nothing's Gonna Stop Us Now"**
- Ghostt: "Have You Ever?"
- **Futureproof: "Nobody Knows"**
- W4: "Wishing on a Star"
- I Sette Cantanti: "California Girls"
- **Hope: "Umbrella"**

Over 25s:

- **Niki: "One Moment in Time"**
- Icaro: "Creep"
- Zyta: "Amazing Grace"
- **Beverley: "When You Tell Me That You Love Me"**
- Daniel M: "Father and Son"
- **Daniel D: "Cannonball"**

Girls:

- **Kimberley: "I’ll Stand by You"**
- Victoria: "Time After Time"
- Kim: "Eternal Flame"
- **Alisha: "Chains"**
- Stephanie: "When You're Gone"
- **Emily: "Beautiful"**

Summary of judges' houses
Judge	Category	Location	Assistant	Acts Eliminated
Minogue	Boys	Ibiza	Terry Ronald	Luke Bayer, Charlie Finn, Dominic Harris
Cowell	Groups	Marbella	Sinitta	Ghostt, I Sette Cantanti, W4
Osbourne	Girls	Los Angeles	Nicole Scherzinger	Victoria Closs, Kim Howlett, Stephanie Woods
Walsh	Over 25s	Dublin	Kian Egan	Daniel Boulle, Icaro Taborda, Zyta Zebihi

== Acts ==
Key:

– Winner
– Runner-Up
– Withdrew

Act	Age(s)	Hometown	Category (mentor)	Result
Leon Jackson	18	Whitburn, West Lothian	Boys (Minogue)	Winner
Rhydian Roberts	24	Powys	Boys (Minogue)	Runner-up
Same Difference	19–22	Portsmouth	Groups (Cowell)	3rd place
Niki Evans	34	Polesworth	Over 25s (Walsh)	4th place
Hope	16–23	Various	Groups (Cowell)	5th place
Beverley Trotman	38	Luton	Over 25s (Walsh)	6th place
Alisha Bennett	22	Wembley	Girls (Osbourne)	7th place
Andy Williams	23	Newport, Wales	Boys (Minogue)	8th place
Futureproof	17–23	Various	Groups (Cowell)	9th place
Emily Nakanda	15	London	Girls (Osbourne)	10th place
Daniel de Bourg	31	Chelmsford	Over 25s (Walsh)	11th place
Kimberley Southwick	19	Tamworth, Staffordshire	Girls (Osbourne)	12th place

== Live shows ==
The live shows commenced on 20 October 2007, a week later than in previous series. This was because of ITV's coverage of the 2007 Rugby World Cup. Ironically, 20 October 2007 also saw the final of the tournament take place in Paris, France. Dermot O'Leary mentioned ITV's broadcast of the game at the end of Live Show 1.

Series 4 saw the continuation of the themed live show format, in which the acts sing songs according to a different musical theme or genre each week. This format was introduced in series 3. Each week a celebrity guest connected to the theme performed in the results show, and some of the guests – Céline Dion, Boyz II Men, Girls Aloud and Michael Bublé – also coached the acts in rehearsal. Series 3 winner, Leona Lewis, appeared as a guest on the first live show on 20 October. During the results show she performed a premiere of her new single, "Bleeding Love", from her debut album, Spirit. Series 2 winner, Shayne Ward, also appeared as a guest on the fourth live show. He performed his latest single, "Breathless", from his second album of the same name during the results show on 10 November. Westlife appeared on the sixth live show on 24 November singing "I'm Already There" from their 2007 album Back Home. Duran Duran sang "Notorious" and "Nite-Runner" during the seventh live show results on 1 December.

The rules relating to judges' votes in the results show changed from previous series. In the past, the decision as to which act was sent home each week was made by the three judges (from which there would always be a majority). Now, with four judges, if there was a two-way tie (billed on the show as "deadlock") the act with the fewest votes from the public would be eliminated, otherwise the judges' decision would stand.

With the appointment of Friedman as choreographer, finalists used dance routines more frequently during their live performances in comparison to previous series.

Three acts (previously two for series 1 and 3) competed in the final for the £1 million recording contract.

Contrary to reports about a change of venue, the live shows for this series continued to be broadcast from The Fountain Studios. Unlike past series there was no dramatic change in the set, only minor alterations and space created for a larger audience.

It was reported that the producers of the show hired a counsellor to help the contestants deal with the pressure of appearing in the live shows each week.

=== Results summary ===
Colour key

Act in Boys

Act in Girls

Act in Over 25s

Act in Groups

–	Act was in the bottom two and had to sing again in the final showdown
–	Act received the fewest public votes and was immediately eliminated (no final showdown)
–	Act won the competition

Weekly results per act
Act	Week 1	Week 2	Week 3	Week 4	Week 5	Week 6	Quarter-Final	Semi-Final	Final	
Act	Week 1	Week 2	Week 3	Week 4	Week 5	Week 6	Quarter-Final	Semi-Final	First Vote	Second Vote
Leon Jackson	Safe	Safe	Safe	Safe	Safe	Safe	Safe	Safe	Safe	Winner
Rhydian Roberts	Safe	Safe	Safe	Safe	Safe	Safe	Safe	Safe	Safe	Runner-Up
Same Difference	Safe	Safe	Safe	Safe	Safe	Safe	Safe	Safe	3rd	Eliminated (final)
Niki Evans	Safe	Safe	Safe	Safe	Safe	Safe	Safe	4th	Eliminated (semi-final)	
Hope	Safe	Safe	Bottom Two	Safe	Bottom Two	5th	5th	Eliminated (quarter-final)		
Beverley Trotman	Safe	Safe	Safe	Bottom Two	Safe	6th	Eliminated (week 6)			
Alisha Bennett	Bottom Two	Bottom Two	Safe	Safe	Bottom Two	Eliminated (week 5)				
Andy Williams	Safe	Safe	Safe	Bottom Two	Eliminated (week 4)					
Futureproof	Safe	Safe	Bottom Two	Eliminated (week 3)						
Emily Nakanda	Safe	Safe	Withdrew (week 3)							
Daniel de Bourg	Safe	Bottom Two	Eliminated (week 2)							
Kimberley Southwick	Bottom Two	Eliminated (week 1)								
Final Showdown	Bennett, Southwick	Bennett, de Bourg	Futureproof, Hope	Trotman, Willams	Bennett, Hope	Hope, Trotman	No final showdown or judges' votes: results were based on public votes alone			
Walsh's vote to eliminate (Over 25s)	Southwick	Bennett	Futureproof	Williams	Bennett	Hope	No final showdown or judges' votes: results were based on public votes alone			
Osbourne's vote to eliminate (Girls)	None (abstained)	de Bourg	Futureproof	Willams	Hope	Trotman	No final showdown or judges' votes: results were based on public votes alone			
Minogue's vote to eliminate (Boys)	Bennett	de Bourg	Hope	Trotman	Bennett	Hope	No final showdown or judges' votes: results were based on public votes alone			
Cowell's vote to eliminate (Groups)	Southwick	de Bourg	Futureproof	Williams	Bennett	Trotman	No final showdown or judges' votes: results were based on public votes alone			
Eliminated	Kimberley Southwick; 2 of 3 votes Majority	Daniel de Bourg; 3 of 4 votes Majority	Futureproof; 3 of 4 votes Majority	Andy Williams; 3 of 4 votes Majority	Alisha Bennett; 3 of 4 votes Majority	Beverley Trotman; 2 of 4 votes Deadlock	Hope; Public vote to save	Niki Evans; Public vote to save	Same Difference; Public vote to save	Rhydian Roberts; Public vote to win

=== Live show details ===
==== Week 1 (20 October) ====
- Theme: Number ones
- Musical guest: Leona Lewis ("Bleeding Love")
- Best bits song: "A Moment Like This"

Acts' performances on the first live show
Act	Category (mentor)	Order	Song	Result
Kimberley Southwick	Girls (Osbourne)	1	"It's Raining Men"	Eliminated
Andy Williams	Boys (Minogue)	2	"I Don't Want to Talk About It"	Safe
Futureproof	Groups (Cowell)	3	"She's the One"	Safe
Beverley Trotman	Over 25s (Walsh)	4	"I Will Survive"	Safe
Emily Nakanda	Girls (Osbourne)	5	"I Knew You Were Waiting (For Me)"	Safe
Leon Jackson	Boys (Minogue)	6	"Can't Buy Me Love"	Safe
Same Difference	Groups (Cowell)	7	"Tragedy"	Safe
Niki Evans	Over 25s (Walsh)	8	"Nothing Compares 2 U"	Safe
Alisha Bennett	Girls (Osbourne)	9	"Dreams"	Bottom Two
Rhydian Roberts	Boys (Minogue)	10	"I'd Do Anything for Love (But I Won't Do That)"	Safe
Daniel DeBourg	Over 25s (Walsh)	11	"Heaven"	Safe
Hope	Groups (Cowell)	12	"Umbrella"	Safe

Judges' votes to eliminate

- Osbourne abstained from voting as both acts were in her category. In fact, she refused to sit at the judging panel during the final showdown performances.
- Cowell: Kimberley Southwick – based on the premise that the show is a "singing competition".
- Minogue: Alisha Bennett – gave no reason.
- Walsh: Kimberley Southwick – stated that Bennett had the "talent factor" and had much more to give to the competition.

==== Week 2 (27 October) ====
- Theme: Film themes
- Musical guest: Celine Dion ("Taking Chances")
- Best bits song: "Chasing Cars"

Acts' performances on the second live show
Act	Category (mentor)	Order	Song	Film	Result
Hope	Groups (Cowell)	1	"Lady Marmalade"	Moulin Rouge!	Safe
Leon Jackson	Boys (Minogue)	2	"Home"	The Wedding Date	Safe
Beverley Trotman	Over 25s (Walsh)	3	"I Have Nothing"	The Bodyguard	Safe
Alisha Bennett	Girls (Osbourne)	4	"I Say a Little Prayer"	My Best Friend's Wedding	Bottom Two
Same Difference	Groups (Cowell)	5	"Breaking Free"	High School Musical	Safe
Daniel DeBourg	Over 25s (Walsh)	6	"Build Me Up Buttercup"	There's Something About Mary	Eliminated
Rhydian Roberts	Boys (Minogue)	7	"The Phantom of the Opera"	The Phantom of the Opera	Safe
Emily Nakanda	Girls (Osbourne)	8	"I'm Not a Girl, Not Yet a Woman"	Crossroads	Safe
Futureproof	Groups (Cowell)	9	"If You Don't Know Me by Now"	My Girl	Safe
Andy Williams	Boys (Minogue)	10	"Stayin' Alive"	Saturday Night Fever	Safe
Niki Evans	Over 25s (Walsh)	11	"My Heart Will Go On"	Titanic	Safe

Judges' votes to eliminate

- Walsh: Alisha Bennett – backed his own act, Daniel DeBourg.
- Osbourne: Daniel DeBourg – backed her own act, Alisha Bennett.
- Minogue: Daniel DeBourg – gave no reason.
- Cowell: Daniel DeBourg – stated that Bennett had more potential to improve.

==== Week 3 (3 November) ====
- Theme: Big band
- Musical guest: Boyz II Men ("It's the Same Old Song" / "Reach Out (I'll Be There)" / "End of the Road")
- Best bits song: "Never Forget"

Acts' performances on the third live show
Act	Category (mentor)	Order	Song	Big Band Artist	Result
Leon Jackson	Boys (Minogue)	1	"Fly Me to the Moon"	Frank Sinatra	Safe
Futureproof	Groups (Cowell)	2	"Can't Take My Eyes Off You"	Andy Williams	Eliminated
Niki Evans	Over 25s (Walsh)	3	"All That Jazz"	Liza Minnelli	Safe
Rhydian Roberts	Boys (Minogue)	4	"Get the Party Started"	Pink	Safe
Same Difference	Groups (Cowell)	5	"Reach"	S Club 7	Safe
Alisha Bennett	Girls (Osbourne)	6	"Valerie"	Amy Winehouse	Safe
Hope	Groups (Cowell)	7	"Hanky Panky"	Madonna	Bottom Two
Andy Williams	Boys (Minogue)	8	"This Guy's in Love with You"	Herb Alpert	Safe
Beverley Trotman	Over 25s (Walsh)	9	"Feeling Good"	Nina Simone	Safe
Emily Nakanda	Girls (Osbourne)	Did not perform ^{1}	"It's Oh So Quiet"	Björk	Withdrew

^1 During the week leading up to the third live show, it was announced that Emily Nakanda had withdrawn from the competition due to a "happy slapping" video involving her that had emerged. She was not replaced and the elimination went ahead as normal. She was due to perform "It's Oh So Quiet" by Björk

Judges' votes to eliminate

- Walsh: Futureproof – stated that Hope's performance on the night was "slick and energetic" and Futureproof's was "sloppy".
- Osbourne: Futureproof – stated that she loved Hope.
- Minogue: Hope – stated that neither act had performed well this week, but that Futureproof had delivered better performances in the previous two weeks.
- Cowell: Futureproof – stated that Hope had greater long-term potential.

==== Week 4 (10 November) ====
- Theme: 21st century classics
- Musical guest: Shayne Ward ("Breathless")
- Best bits song: "I Can't Make You Love Me"

Acts' performances on the fourth live show
Act	Category (mentor)	Order	Song	Year	Result
Niki Evans	Over 25s (Walsh)	1	"Because of You"	2005	Safe
Same Difference	Groups (Cowell)	2	"I Don't Feel Like Dancin'"	2006	Safe
Andy Williams	Boys (Minogue)	3	"Chasing Cars"	2006	Eliminated
Beverley Trotman	Over 25s (Walsh)	4	"You're Beautiful"	2005	Bottom Two
Hope	Groups (Cowell)	5	"Back to Black"	2007	Safe
Leon Jackson	Boys (Minogue)	6	"Dancing in the Moonlight"	2000	Safe
Alisha Bennett	Girls (Osbourne)	7	"Put Your Records On"	2006	Safe
Rhydian Roberts	Boys (Minogue)	8	"You Raise Me Up"	2002	Safe

Judges' votes to eliminate

- Walsh: Andy Williams – backed his own act, Beverley Trotman.
- Osbourne: Andy Williams – gave no reason.
- Minogue: Beverley Trotman – backed her own act, Andy Williams.
- Cowell: Andy Williams – stated that he believed the public would prefer to see Trotman saved.

==== Week 5 (17 November) ====
- Theme: Disco
- Musical guest: Girls Aloud ("Call the Shots")
- Best bits song: "Butterfly"

Contestants' performances on the fifth live show
Act	Category (mentor)	Order	Song	Result
Leon Jackson	Boys (Minogue)	1	"Relight My Fire"	Safe
Niki Evans	Over 25s (Walsh)	2	"Hot Stuff"	Safe
Rhydian Roberts	Boys (Minogue)	3	"Go West"	Safe
Hope	Groups (Cowell)	4	"Gimme! Gimme! Gimme! (A Man After Midnight)"/"Hung Up"	Bottom Two
Beverley Trotman	Over 25s (Walsh)	5	"I'm Every Woman"	Safe
Alisha Bennett	Girls (Osbourne)	6	"Young Hearts Run Free"	Eliminated
Same Difference	Groups (Cowell)	7	"Blame It on the Boogie"	Safe

Judges' votes to eliminate

- Cowell: Alisha Bennett – backed his own act, Hope.
- Minogue: Alisha Bennett – gave no reason.
- Osbourne: Hope – backed her own act, Alisha Bennett.
- Walsh: Alisha Bennett – gave no reason but stated that neither act deserved to be in the bottom two.

==== Week 6 (24 November) ====
- Theme: Love songs
- Musical guest: Westlife ("I'm Already There")
- Best bits song: "One Moment in Time"

Acts' performances on the sixth live show
Act	Category (mentor)	Order	Song	Result
Beverley Trotman	Over 25s (Walsh)	1	"Without You"	Eliminated
Same Difference	Groups (Cowell)	2	"Nothing's Gonna Stop Us Now"	Safe
Niki Evans	Over 25s (Walsh)	3	"The Power of Love"	Safe
Rhydian Roberts	Boys (Minogue)	4	"Somewhere"	Safe
Hope	Groups (Cowell)	5	"Hurt"	Bottom Two
Leon Jackson	Boys (Minogue)	6	"You Don't Know Me"	Safe

Judges' votes to eliminate

- Walsh: Hope – backed his own act, Beverley Trotman.
- Cowell: Beverley Trotman – backed his own act, Hope.
- Minogue: Hope – stated that Trotman was more consistent.
- Osbourne: Beverley Trotman – stated "I'm doing this for a reason, and you'll realise the reason when I say it. I'm sending home Beverley", implying that she wanted to send the result to deadlock.

With the acts in the bottom two receiving two votes each, the result went to deadlock and reverted to the earlier public vote. Trotman was eliminated as the act with the fewest public votes. This was the first time in the show's history that the result went to deadlock.

==== Week 7: Quarter-Final (1 December) ====
- Theme: British classics
- Musical guest: Duran Duran ("Notorious")
- Best bits song: "I’ll Stand by You"

Acts' performances in the quarter-final
Act	Category (mentor)	Order	First song	British Artist	Order	Second song	British Artist	Result
Rhydian Roberts	Boys (Minogue)	1	"Somebody to Love"	Queen	10	"I Vow to Thee, My Country"/"World in Union"	Traditional	Safe
Hope	Groups (Cowell)	2	"2 Become 1"	Spice Girls	6	"We Will Rock You"	Queen	Eliminated
Niki Evans	Over 25s (Walsh)	3	"Total Eclipse of the Heart"	Bonnie Tyler	9	"Fields of Gold"	Sting	Safe
Leon Jackson	Boys (Minogue)	4	"Crazy Little Thing Called Love"	Queen	7	"The Long and Winding Road"	The Beatles	Safe
Same Difference	Groups (Cowell)	5	"Any Dream Will Do"	Andrew Lloyd Webber	8	"Wake Me Up Before You Go-Go"	Wham!	Safe

The quarter-final did not feature a final showdown and instead the act with the fewest public votes, Hope, were automatically eliminated.

==== Week 8: Semi-Final (8 December) ====
- Themes: Mentor's choice; contestant's choice
- Musical guest: Michael Bublé ("Lost")
- Best bits song: "I Will Always Love You"

Acts' performances in the semi-final
Act	Category (mentor)	Order	First song	Order	Second song	Result
Niki Evans	Over 25s (Walsh)	1	"Songbird"	5	"One Moment in Time"	Eliminated
Leon Jackson	Boys (Minogue)	2	"The Very Thought of You"	6	"How Sweet It Is (To Be Loved by You)"	Safe
Rhydian Roberts	Boys (Minogue)	3	"Bridge over Troubled Water"	7	"You'll Never Walk Alone"	Safe
Same Difference	Groups (Cowell)	4	"Chain Reaction"	8	"Never Had a Dream Come True"	Safe

The semi-final did not feature a final showdown and instead the act with the fewest public votes, Niki Evans, was automatically eliminated.

==== Week 9: Final (15 December) ====
- Themes: Christmas songs; celebrity duets; song of the series; winner's single
- Group performance: "One Moment in Time" (auditionees)
- Musical guest: Kylie Minogue ("Wow")
- Best bits songs: "Breaking Free", "Time to Say Goodbye" & "Home"

Acts' performances in the final
Act	Category (mentor)	Order	First song	Order	Second song	Duet Partner	Order	Third song	Order	Fourth song	Result
Same Difference	Groups (Cowell)	1	"All I Want for Christmas Is You"	4	"Any Dream Will Do"	Jason Donovan	7	"Breaking Free"	N/A	N/A (already eliminated)	Eliminated
Leon Jackson	Boys (Minogue)	2	"White Christmas"	5	"Better the Devil You Know"	Kylie Minogue	8	"You Don't Know Me"	10	"When You Believe"	Winner
Rhydian Roberts	Boys (Minogue)	3	"O Holy Night"	6	"You Raise Me Up"	Katherine Jenkins	9	"Somewhere"	11	"When You Believe"	Runner-Up

== Reception ==
=== Ratings ===
The fourth series proved yet again to be a ratings winner. The first episode peaked at 10.7 million viewers, with an average of 9.5 million viewers (45% share), according to unofficial overnight ratings. This was 2.5 million viewers higher than last year's launch, and higher than the series finale of both series 1 and series 2. Moreover, 60% of 16- to 34-year-olds tuned in that night. The Xtra Factor on ITV2 also performed well on its launch night, with an overnight figure of 1.2 million viewers watching the episode – 500,000 more than for the 2006 launch.

The second episode was another ratings success and attracted more viewers than all of the other terrestrial channels combined. The show peaked at 10 million viewers with an average of 8.5 million, beating its rival DanceX (the finale) on BBC One which attracted 3.6 million.

The third episode attracted 8.7 million viewers, which was considerably more than BBC One's Eurovision Dance Contest which achieved an audience of 3.8 million viewers. Viewing figures remained strong in the fourth episode, averaging 8.2 million viewers. The fifth episode featuring auditions generated 7 million viewers and a 43% share of audience. The sixth and final episode featuring auditions attracted another strong audience which peaked at 9.2 million and averaged with 8 million and an audience share of 45%.

The seventh and eighth episodes in the series featured the successful candidates auditioning at boot-camp. Despite competition from BBC One's Strictly Come Dancing, The X Factor received the highest viewing figures, beating Strictly Come Dancing by 2.1 million viewers and receiving 6.8 million in total. The second part of the show attracted 7.2 million viewers. The ninth instalment won 7.5 million viewers, narrowly beating the live launch of Strictly Come Dancing, which had 7.2 million.

The final of The X Factor on 15 December scored highly in the ratings with a peak audience of 12.1 million. The first part of the show attracted an average of 11.4 million viewers, whilst the second half averaged with 11.7 million viewers. This was the highest rating, in terms of total viewership, for all four series of the show.

Episode	Air date	Official ITV1 rating	Weekly rank
Auditions 1	18 August	9.78	1
Auditions 2	25 August	8.88	3
Auditions 3	1 September	9.23	1
Auditions 4	8 September	8.76	4
Auditions 5	15 September	7.23	12
Auditions 6	22 September	8.34	8
Bootcamp 1	29 September	6.42	21
Bootcamp 2	29 September	7.12	13
Judges' houses 1	6 October	8.08	11
Judges' houses 2	7 October	7.92	12
Live show 1	20 October	6.60	23
Live results 1	20 October	7.02	18
Live show 2	27 October	7.51	19
Live results 2	27 October	7.51	18
Live show 3	3 November	8.47	14
Live results 3	3 November	6.99	19
Live show 4	10 November	9.18	12
Live results 4	10 November	8.59	13
Live show 5	17 November	9.15	11
Live results 5	17 November	8.05	17
Live show 6	24 November	9.30	11
Live results 6	24 November	8.88	12
Live show 7	1 December	9.56	9
Live results 7	1 December	7.82	20
Live semi-final	8 December	9.83	9
Live semi-final results	8 December	9.62	10
Live final	15 December	11.78	2
Live final results	15 December	12.23	1
Series average	2007	8.57	—N/a

== Controversies ==
=== Osbourne's walkout ===
During the results of the first live show on 20 October, Osbourne walked away from the panel after it was revealed that both the bottom two acts came from her category. This left the three remaining judges, Cowell, Minogue and Walsh, to decide which of the bottom two would be sent home. When O'Leary asked Osbourne to clarify if she was abstaining, she claimed to have left the show, saying, "I'm out—gone". It later emerged that Osbourne was dissatisfied with the last-minute rescheduling of the programme from 17:45 to 17:30, claiming that fewer people saw the performance of her act, Kimberley Southwick, as she was first on stage. After a considerable amount of media coverage, including Paul O'Grady apparently convincing Osbourne live on his chat show to return to The X Factor, Osbourne's spokesman confirmed on 23 October that she would return to the show.

=== Alleged feuds and alliances ===
During the filming of The X Factor, there was much media speculation about rumoured feuds between the judges, most notably between Osbourne and Minogue. In an interview published on 2 December 2007, Minogue stated "As for Sharon, you don't click with everybody. But it's her choice not to be friends. Apparently she's envious because I'm younger and prettier." Cowell admitted that Osbourne did not feel comfortable about having a new judge and that Osbourne and Minogue would never be "the best of buddies," adding that if Osbourne wanted to leave the show, he would let her (in fact, Osbourne left after series 4). The apparent flirting between Cowell and Minogue also generated comment in the popular media.

=== Impartiality ===
Series 4 presented a change in the panellists' judging style. Simon Cowell said at the ITV Autumn Launch: "We tried to be bit more impartial as judges, and that, you'll see a lot more of on X Factor. There's still competition within the judges but our job essentially is to find a star." This ethic was put into practice with the judges working together at the bootcamp. During the live shows, the acts were no longer introduced with their mentors at the start of the show. Only the judges were introduced, after which the individual performances began.

=== Standard of talent ===
At ITV's Autumn launch on 12 July 2007, Cowell discussed the upcoming series. He said that in previous years the programme had been more like a "popularity contest" than a talent show. When asked about the standard of talent, Cowell said: "It's in a different league this year... we're going to have the best 12 [finalists] we've ever seen". This came with comments that the series 4 auditions had gone "brilliantly".

Series 4 also saw more emphasis placed on the international standing of The X Factor, with Cowell calling it "the biggest show in Europe" with around 150,000 auditioning for the series. Referring to the impact that the international success of series 3 winner Leona Lewis had had on the show, Dannii Minogue said at the Sheffield auditions: "I think that Leona has completely upped the ante now on this show, and there's no turning back. We're looking for an international standard of acts that can sell millions of albums". In response to the expectation of a raised standard of talent on the show, producers tried with series 4 to assemble what O'Leary called an "international panel of judges"; this was particularly the case with the original judging line-up that included Friedman. There were also more international contestants in series 4, with two acts from the United States, numerous acts from Japan and a Brazilian act auditioning.

Nevertheless, Cowell said before the first live show that "I think we could be heading for a train wreck," referring to the fact that the public did not believe any of the final 12 this year were as good as Lewis, but he added, "But if you take Leona out of the equation, they weren't that good last year. As a whole, we've probably got the most talented 12 we've had. We just haven't had the chance to showcase them properly yet."

=== Contestants ===
Following girlband Hope's victory at judges houses, member Sisi Jghalef was eliminated prior to the live shows when it was discovered by the producers that she had an outstanding criminal conviction, thus violating the rules of the competition. Prior to auditioning as a solo artist, Jghalef had reportedly racially threatened a black McDonald's worker and failed to complete 200 hours of community service. Following her elimination, she had reportedly tried to commit suicide by attempting to overdose on paracetamol: "If my mum hadn't found me I would be dead by now [...] I've managed to pull myself together [now] thanks to my friends and family", she told Mirror Online. On her elimination, Jghalef said: "I could have understood it if I hadn't made the final, but to have been told I was then in and let the TV cameras record my joy only to then be told I was axed was too much to take". Jghalef also later admitted to smoking cannabis at bootcamp: "I only did a bit of weed", she claimed. "There was a lot more [harder drugs] than that going on and there's video tapes to prove it". An X Factor spokesman said: "We weren't aware she was smoking cannabis and we wouldn't condone it. It shows we were right to get rid of her."

=== Alleged voting irregularities ===
It was reported that Ofcom received at least 1,900 complaints from would-be voters for eventual runner-up Rhydian Roberts, saying that despite calling numerous times they were unable to get through to vote for Roberts. The programme said the high number of calls meant some people were greeted by engaged tones. ITV denied the allegations, commenting that "As all numbers go through to the same lines and vote platform it is impossible for there to be any bias in favour or against a particular contestant." ITV confirmed that Jackson performed strongly throughout the series and won on the night of the final by around 10% of the popular vote. A subsequent Ofcom investigation found that Roberts had not been unfairly disadvantaged.
