= List of best-selling singles and albums of 2007 in Ireland =

This is a list of the best selling singles, albums and as according to IRMA. Further listings can be found here.

== Top Selling singles ==
Pos.	Title	Artist	Peak
1	"Bleeding Love"	Leona Lewis	1
2	"Umbrella"	Rihanna featuring Jay-Z	1
3	"Grace Kelly"	Mika	1
4	"The Way I Are"	Timbaland feat. Keri Hilson & D.O.E.	1
5	"Hey There Delilah"	Plain White T's	2
6	"If That's OK with You"	Shayne Ward	1
7	"Beautiful Girls"	Sean Kingston	1
8	"Girlfriend"	Avril Lavigne	1
9	"Apologize"	Timbaland presents OneRepublic	1
10	"How to Save a Life"	The Fray	1

== Top Selling albums ==
Pos.	Title	Artist	Peak
1	Spirit	Leona Lewis	1
2	Back To Black	Amy Winehouse	1
3	Back Home	Westlife	1
4	Call Me Irresponsible	Michael Bublé	1
5	The Ultimate Hits	Garth Brooks	2
6	Breathless	Shayne Ward	1
7	Everytime We Touch	Cascada	1
8	Beautiful World	Take That	1
9	Good Girl Gone Bad	Rihanna	1
10	Because of the Times	Kings of Leon	1

Notes:

- *Compilation albums are not included.
