= The X Factor: Battle of the Stars =

British television series

- Hosted by: Kate Thornton
- Judges: Simon Cowell; Sharon Osbourne; Louis Walsh
- Winner: Lucy Benjamin
- Runner-up: Matt Stevens

Release
- Original network: ITV
- Original release: 29 May – 5 June 2006

The X Factor: Battle of the Stars is a UK celebrity special edition of The X Factor, which screened on ITV, started on 29 May 2006 and lasting for eight consecutive nights. Pop Idol was meant to air in its place as Celebrity Pop Idol but was stopped shortly before transmission, when ITV picked The X Factor over it.

Nine celebrity acts participated, singing live in front of the nation and facing the judges of the previous The X Factor series, Simon Cowell, Sharon Osbourne and Louis Walsh. Voting revenues were donated to the celebrities' chosen charities.

Cowell originally axed the format after its first airing, describing as "pointless", however, a revamped variation of the format aired in 2019, titled The X Factor: Celebrity with Cowell and Walsh reprising their roles as judges and Nicole Scherzinger replacing Osbourne on the panel as well as Dermot O'Leary taking over from Kate Thornton as host.

== Contestants ==
Key:

– Winner
– Runner-up

Act(s)	Age(s)	Category (mentor)	Known For	Result
Lucy Benjamin	35	Over 25s (Walsh)	Former EastEnders actress	Winner
Matt Stevens	23	16-24s (Osbourne)	Rugby union player	Runner-up
Chris Moyles	32	Over 25s (Walsh)	Television & radio presenter	3rd place
The Chefs (Note: The Chefs consists of Jean-Christophe Novelli, Aldo Zilli, Paul Rankin and Ross Burden.)	37–50	Groups (Cowell)	Celebrity chefs	4th place
Nikki Sanderson	22	16-24s (Osbourne)	Former Coronation Street actress	5th place
James & Rebecca (Note: Loos replaced Andrea Catherwood, who was originally scheduled to appear as James Hewitt's singing partner, but was not allowed to appear after ITV News bosses refused to give her permission.)	48 & 28	Groups (Cowell)	Former British Army cavalry officer (Hewitt); Media personality & glamour model (Loos)	6th place
Michelle Marsh	23	16-24s (Osbourne)	Page 3 girl & glamour model	7th place
Gillian McKeith	46	Over 25s (Walsh)	Nutritionist, author & television presenter	8th place
Paul† & Debbie	68 & 47	Groups (Cowell)	Magician & television presenter (Daniels); Magician's assistant (McGee)	9th place

== Live shows ==
=== Results summary ===
Colour key

–	Contestant was in the bottom two and had to sing again in the final showdown
–	Contestant received the fewest public votes and was immediately eliminated (no final showdown)

Act	Show 1	Show 2	Show 3	Show 4	Show 5	Quarter-Final	Semi-Final	Final
Lucy Benjamin	Safe	Safe	Bottom Two	Safe	Safe	Safe	Safe	Winner (day 8)
Matt Stevens	Safe	Safe	Safe	Safe	Safe	Safe	Safe	Runner-up (day 8)
Chris Moyles	Safe	Safe	Safe	Safe	Safe	Safe	3rd	Eliminated (day 7)
The Chefs	Safe	Safe	Safe	Safe	Bottom Two	4th	Eliminated (day 6)	
Nikki Sanderson	Safe	Safe	Safe	Bottom Two	Bottom Two	Eliminated (day 5)		
James & Rebecca	Safe	Safe	Safe	Bottom Two	Eliminated (day 4)			
Michelle Marsh	Safe	Bottom Two	Bottom Two	Eliminated (day 3)				
Gillian McKeith	Bottom Two	Bottom Two	Eliminated (day 2)					
Paul & Debbie	Bottom Two	Eliminated (day 1)						
Final showdown	McKeith, Paul & Debbie	McKeith, Marsh	Benjamin, Marsh	James & Rebecca, Sanderson	The Chefs, Sanderson	No final showdown or judges' votes; results were based on public votes alone		
Walsh's vote to eliminate (Over 25s)	Paul & Debbie	Marsh	Marsh	James & Rebecca	Sanderson	No final showdown or judges' votes; results were based on public votes alone		
Osbourne's vote to eliminate (16-24s)	Paul & Debbie	McKeith	Benjamin	James & Rebecca	The Chefs	No final showdown or judges' votes; results were based on public votes alone		
Cowell's vote to eliminate (Groups)	McKeith	McKeith	Marsh	Sanderson	Sanderson	No final showdown or judges' votes; results were based on public votes alone		
Eliminated	Paul & Debbie; 2 of 3 votes Majority	Gillian McKeith; 2 of 3 votes Majority	Michelle Marsh; 2 of 3 votes Majority	James & Rebecca; 2 of 3 votes Majority	Nikki Sanderson; 2 of 3 votes Majority	The Chefs; Public vote to save	Chris Moyles; Public vote to save	Matt Stevens; Public vote to win

=== Live show details ===
==== Show 1 (29 May 2006) ====
Contestants' performances on the first live show
Act	Order	Song	Result
Paul & Debbie	1	"Let Me Entertain You"	Eliminated
Nikki Sanderson	2	"I've Got the Music in Me"	Safe
Gillian McKeith	3	"I Just Want to Make Love to You"	Bottom two
The Chefs	4	"Uptown Girl"	Safe
Matt Stevens	5	"Mack the Knife"	Safe
Lucy Benjamin	6	"Put Your Records On"	Safe
James & Rebecca	7	"Addicted to Love"	Safe
Michelle Marsh	8	"River Deep – Mountain High"	Safe
Chris Moyles	9	"Ain't That a Kick in the Head?"	Safe

Judges' votes to eliminate

- Cowell: Gillian McKeith - backed his own act, Paul & Debbie.
- Walsh: Paul & Debbie - backed his own act, Gillian McKeith.
- Osbourne: Paul & Debbie - based on the final showdown performance.

==== Show 2 (30 May 2006) ====
Contestants' performances on the second live show
Act	Order	Song	Result
Chris Moyles	1	"You Really Got Me"	Safe
Michelle Marsh	2	"Eternal Flame"	Bottom two
The Chefs	3	"Volare"	Safe
Lucy Benjamin	4	"Walking on Sunshine"	Safe
Gillian McKeith	5	"The Shoop Shoop Song (It's in His Kiss)"	Eliminated
James & Rebecca	6	"Baby, It's Cold Outside"	Safe
Nikki Sanderson	7	"Emotion"	Safe
Matt Stevens	8	"Smooth"	Safe

Judges' votes to eliminate

- Walsh: Michelle Marsh - backed his own act, Gillian McKeith.
- Osbourne: Gillian McKeith - backed her own act, Michelle Marsh.
- Cowell: Gillian McKeith - based on the final showdown performance.

==== Show 3 (31 May 2006) ====
Contestants' performances on the third live show
Act	Order	Song	Result
Lucy Benjamin	1	"Get the Party Started"	Bottom two
Nikki Sanderson	2	"The Voice Within"	Safe
Chris Moyles	3	"What a Wonderful World"	Safe
Michelle Marsh	4	"Ironic"	Eliminated
The Chefs	5	"To All the Girls I've Loved Before"	Safe
Matt Stevens	6	"I Don't Want to Miss a Thing"	Safe
James & Rebecca	7	"Rock DJ"	Safe

Judges' votes to eliminate

- Osbourne: Lucy Benjamin - backed her own act, Michelle Marsh.
- Walsh: Michelle Marsh - backed his own act, Lucy Benjamin.
- Cowell: Michelle Marsh - based on the final showdown performance.

==== Show 4 (1 June 2006) ====
Contestants' performances on the fourth live show
Act	Order	Song	Result
Nikki Sanderson	1	"I Love Rock 'n' Roll"	Bottom two
Chris Moyles	2	"Beautiful Day"	Safe
James & Rebecca	3	"The Way You Make Me Feel"	Eliminated
Matt Stevens	4	"(Sittin' On) The Dock of the Bay"	Safe
Lucy Benjamin	5	"See the Day" (Girls Aloud)	Safe
The Chefs	6	"Crazy Little Thing Called Love"	Safe

Judges' votes to eliminate

- Cowell: Nikki Sanderson - backed his own act, James & Rebecca.
- Osbourne: James & Rebecca - backed her own act, Nikki Sanderson
- Walsh: James & Rebecca - based on the final showdown performance.

==== Show 5 (2 June 2006) ====
Contestants' performances on the fifth live show
Act	Order	First Song	Order	Second song	Result
The Chefs	1	"Get Back"	6	"That's Amore"	Bottom two
Nikki Sanderson	2	"Run to You"	7	"Shackles (Praise You)"	Eliminated
Chris Moyles	3	"Achilles Heel"	8	"Avenues and Alleyways"	Safe
Lucy Benjamin	4	"Call Me"	9	"Killing Me Softly with His Song"	Safe
Matt Stevens	5	"Nobody Knows"	10	"Piano Man"	Safe

Judges' votes to eliminate

- Osbourne: The Chefs - backed her own act, Nikki Sanderson.
- Cowell: Nikki Sanderson - backed his own act, The Chefs.
- Walsh: Nikki Sanderson - based on the final showdown performance.

==== Show 6: Quarter-final (3 June 2006) ====
Contestants' performances on the sixth live show
Act	Order	First Song	Order	Second song	Result
Matt Stevens	1	"Moondance"	5	"Desperado"	Safe
The Chefs	2	"Can't Take My Eyes Off You"	6	"Livin' la Vida Loca"	Eliminated
Chris Moyles	3	"That's My Goal"	7	"Burning Love"	Safe
Lucy Benjamin	4	"If I Ain't Got You"	8	"Maybe"	Safe

For the first time in the series, there was no bottom two. The act with the fewest votes was eliminated.

==== Show 7: Semi-final (4 June 2006) ====
Contestants' performances on the seventh live show
Act	Order	First Song	Order	Second song	Result
Chris Moyles	1	"Hard To Handle"	4	"Wonderwall"	Eliminated
Lucy Benjamin	2	"That Ole Devil Called Love"	5	"Torn"	Safe
Matt Stevens	3	"I Got A Woman"	6	"She's The One"	Safe

For the second time in the series, there was no bottom two. The act with the fewest votes was eliminated.

==== Show 8: Final (5 June 2006) ====
All the contestants appeared to perform "I'd Like to Teach the World to Sing" and Shayne Ward performed "Stand by Me".

Act	Order	First song	Order	Second song	Result
Matt Stevens	1	"Theme from New York, New York"	3	"Mack The Knife"	Runner-Up
Lucy Benjamin	2	"Last Dance"	4	"See The Day"	Winner

== Reception ==
=== Ratings ===
All ratings are taken from the UK Programme Ratings website, BARB.

Episode	Air date	Official rating (millions)	Weekly rank for all UK TV channels
Live show 1	29 May	5.79	24
Live show 2	30 May	4.42	40
Live show 3	31 May	6.07	21
Live show 4	1 June	5.89	23
Live show 5	2 June	5.57	28
Live quarter-final	3 June	5.35	31
Live semi-final	4 June	6.31	19
Live final	5 June	6.62	14
Series average	2006	5.75	—N/a

== Axing and revival ==
It was reported on 26 August 2006 that Cowell had axed the show, describing it as "pointless" and adding "we are never going to do it again." However, Cowell later stated in an interview with The Sun on 30 November 2018 that he would consider reviving the show for a second series as a charity special.

The show's format was reported to return in 2019, along with a separate series for former contestants with a similar format, as the regular series is being put on hiatus due to declining ratings. On 7 July 2019, Walsh spoke about the return of the series, stating, "I go to Los Angeles on Tuesday, I go to Simon's house in Malibu, it's me Simon and Nicole [Scherzinger] and we're doing the celebrity one."
