= Louis Walsh =

Irish music manager and television personality (born 1952)

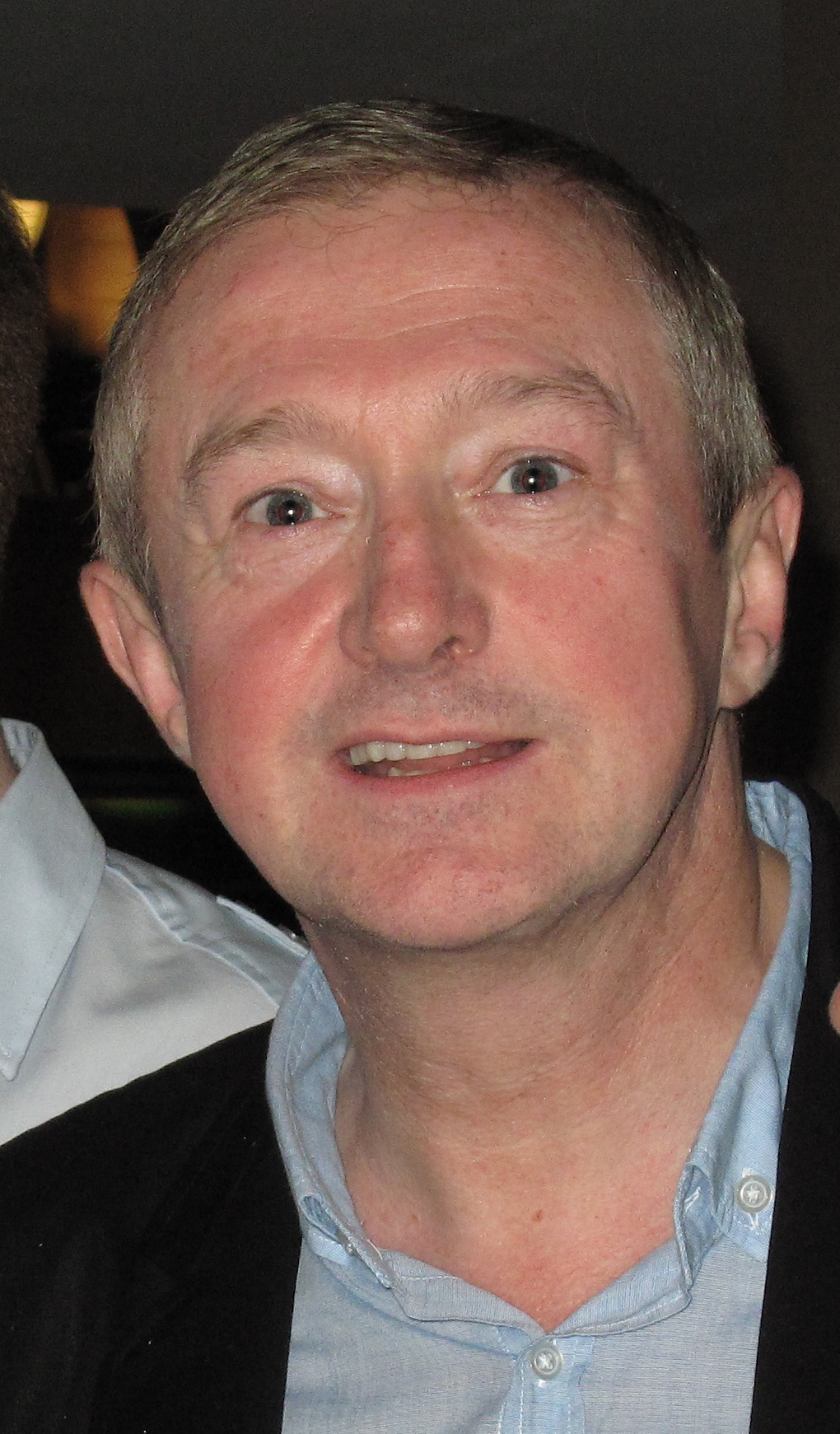
- Walsh in 2009
- Born: Michael Louis Vincent Walsh; 5 August 1952 (age 74); Kiltimagh, County Mayo, Ireland
- Occupations: Music manager; television personality
- Years active: 1969–present

Michael Louis Vincent Walsh (born 5 August 1952) is an Irish music manager and television personality. He has managed Johnny Logan, Boyzone, Jedward and Westlife, four of Ireland's most successful pop acts in the 1990s and 2000s. He has also served as a judge on television talent competition shows, including Popstars (2001–2002), You're a Star (2003–2004), The X Factor (2004–2014; 2016–2017), and Ireland's Got Talent (2018–2019). In 2024, Walsh was a contestant on the twenty-third series of the reality show Celebrity Big Brother.

== Early life ==
Michael Louis Vincent Walsh was born in Kiltimagh in County Mayo, Ireland, on 5 August 1952, the son of Maureen and Frank Walsh. He is the second of eight children. He was raised Roman Catholic.

== Music manager ==
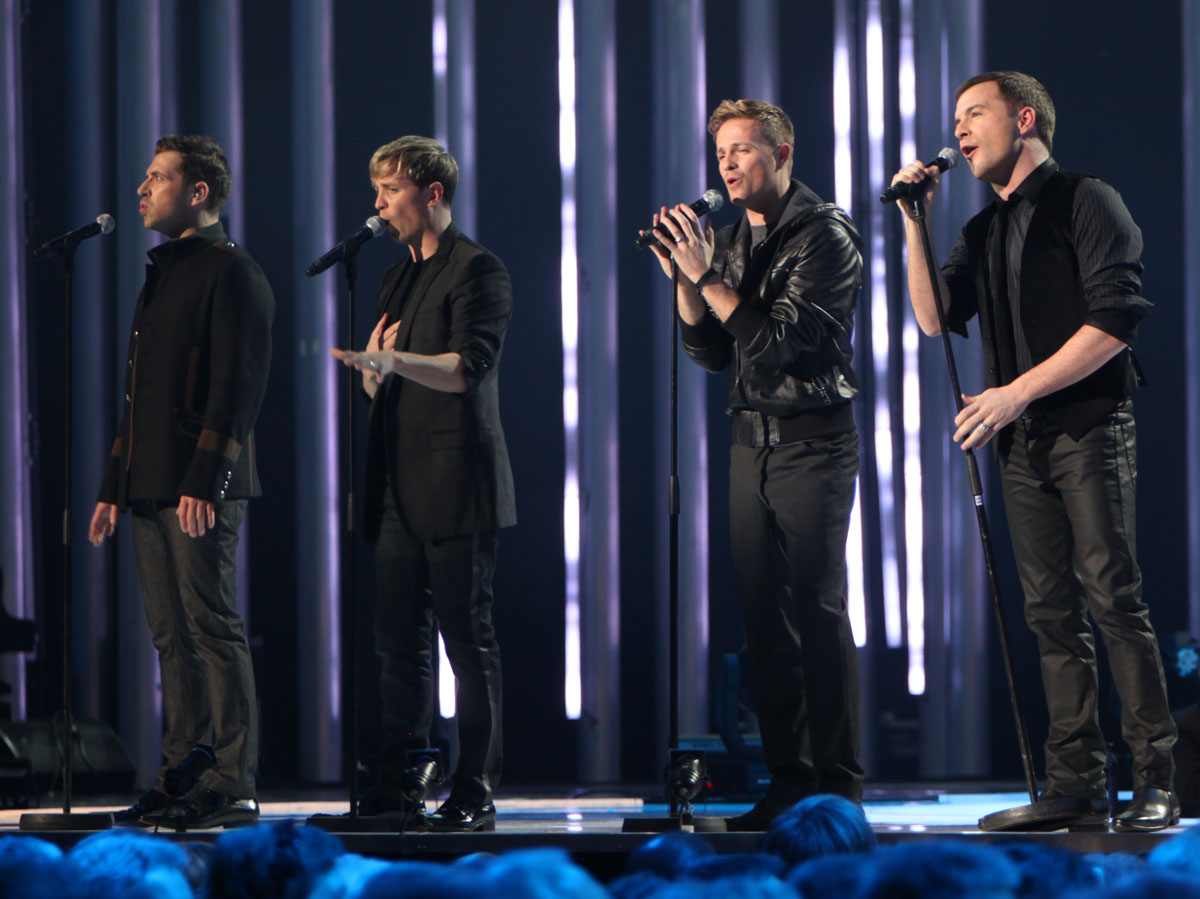
Westlife, created by Walsh

Walsh moved to Dublin in the late 1970s to start his music industry career. In 1993 he created an Irish version of Take That, which the papers picked up on when he advertised open auditions. The end result was Boyzone, whom he managed to international success with 16 top three singles, six of which were number ones, as well as four number one albums, selling more than 20 million copies worldwide. When Ronan Keating announced he wanted to take a break from Boyzone, Walsh continued to manage his career. Keating achieved a number one hit with "When You Say Nothing At All" in 1999 and also "Life Is a Rollercoaster" in 2000, while his album sold 4.4 million copies. Keating and Walsh later agreed to part company as Keating's solo career reached an all-time high.

Walsh then went back to the boy band formula to create Westlife, which Keating co-managed with Walsh for the first couple of Westlife's number one singles and albums. Westlife were an Irish boy band, formed in Dublin in July 1998. They sold over 50 million records worldwide, a total that included studio albums, singles, video releases, and compilation albums. The group accumulated 14 number-one singles in the United Kingdom. They achieved a total of 26 UK top ten singles over their 14-year career, and achieved the first number one on the UK Singles Downloads Chart with "Flying Without Wings" in September 2004. Despite an earlier bitter feud, Walsh had a public reconciliation with Boyzone on the ITV2 programme Ghosthunting With... in which they explored a network of subterranean streets beneath Edinburgh. In December 2012, he became Union J's manager.

== Television career ==
Walsh's first television work was in 2001, in the Irish version of Popstars. The following year, Walsh appeared as a judge on the UK ITV show Popstars: The Rivals, with Pete Waterman and Geri Halliwell. Walsh went head-to-head with Waterman on the show, with his girlband Girls Aloud battling it out with Waterman's boy band One True Voice. Girls Aloud's debut single "Sound of the Underground" reached number one in the UK. Walsh managed the band to achieve a million singles sales, while their debut album went platinum.

Walsh also frequently appears on various talent shows on Raidió Teilifís Éireann (RTÉ), the most recent being You're a Star. He covered for Simon Cowell as a judge on Britain's Got Talent during series four's Birmingham auditions in February 2010, due to Cowell being ill. He again filled in for David Hasselhoff at the London auditions in the following series when Hasselhoff was unavailable due to appearing in pantomime.

In January 2012, Walsh appeared on the ITV documentary series The Talent Show Story where he was interviewed about being a judge on The X Factor and Popstars The Rivals. Fellow Popstars judge Pete Waterman also appeared on the programme as well as past and present X Factor judges, including Dannii Minogue, Simon Cowell, Kelly Rowland and Gary Barlow.

=== The X Factor ===
Walsh appeared from 2004 as a judge, along with Simon Cowell and Sharon Osbourne, on ITV talent show The X Factor. In 2004, Walsh found chart success with G4, who went on to have a chart-topping album and completed two tours of the UK. In 2005, Walsh managed the winner Shayne Ward, whose debut single "That's My Goal" spent four weeks at UK number one.

In November 2005, Walsh quit the show mid-series out of protest regarding his treatment on the show; the most explicit example being Osbourne's drenching him with water during a live recording. Walsh returned on the Saturday evening's live show, stating that he could not abandon his remaining contestant and eventual winner, Shayne Ward. Ward went on to win the competition with over 10 million votes in the final. Walsh then went on to win The X Factor: Battle of the Stars with actress Lucy Benjamin.

ITV announced in March 2007 that Walsh would not return as a judge on The X Factor, but would remain behind the scenes managing some acts from the show. According to UK tabloid newspaper The Sun, the decision to be replaced with two other judges came as a shock to him. He was replaced on the panel by American choreographer Brian Friedman. Osbourne, Cowell, Friedman and new judge Dannii Minogue appeared at the London auditions; however, after the first few days, Cowell decided to re-hire Walsh to the panel and hire Friedman as a choreographic instructor for the live show stages. On 22 June 2007, Walsh confirmed he would be returning as a judge for the fourth series of The X Factor. Friedman then became the show's creative director. Walsh mentored the Over 25s category in series four. In the 'Judges Houses' stage of the competition, Walsh took his contestants to Dublin and invited guest Kian Egan to help him decide whom to take through to the live shows.

Cowell reportedly told Walsh off for his comments about the Spice Girls. Walsh had said that the girl group were "past their sell-by date" and lacking in talent, but Cowell already had plans to book the girls on the show.

In 2008, Walsh returned for the fifth series along with Cowell, Minogue and Cheryl Cole, who was hired after Osbourne quit the previous June. In this series, Walsh mentored the groups, choosing JLS, Girlband and Bad Lashes to represent him in the live shows. Walsh took his contestants to Castle Leslie in Ireland during the judges houses stage where he was aided by Westlife star Shane Filan. Bad Lashes and Girlband were the first two contestants to be eliminated over the first two weeks, but JLS finished as runners-up.

Walsh returned to the sixth series show in 2009, again mentoring the groups for the fourth time in six years. During the judges houses stage, the Groups and Walsh flew to Lake Como in Italy where Boyzone singer Ronan Keating helped Walsh pick his top three contestants. Walsh took Kandy Rain, Miss Frank and John & Edward to the live shows. Kandy Rain were eliminated in the first live results show, from which Walsh was absent due to the sudden death of Boyzone member Stephen Gately. Walsh was absent again on the Saturday and Sunday of the second week of live shows due to Gately's funeral on 17 October. In week three, Miss Frank were eliminated from the competition, while John & Edward were eliminated in week seven, though went on to have successful careers in the industry.

In 2010, Walsh mentored the Over 28s category on the seventh series of The X Factor. In the judges houses stage, Walsh took his contestants to Adare in Ireland. Walsh was helped by former judge, Sharon Osbourne. His last surviving contestant, Mary Byrne, was a semi-finalist been the twelfth contestant eliminated.

Walsh returned to the show in 2011 for series eight. He joined new panellists Gary Barlow, Kelly Rowland and Tulisa, who replaced former judges Cowell, Minogue and Cole, all of whom left the show after series seven. This meant that, following Cowell's departure, Walsh became the only original judge left on the programme. During the Bootcamp stages it was announced that he would mentor the Over 25s category for the rest of the competition.

In the Judges Houses stage, Walsh took his contestants to Barcelona in Spain where he was aided by Cowell's former assistant judge Sinitta. Walsh chose Kitty Brucknell, Sami Brookes, Johnny Robinson and Jonjo Kerr to go through to the live shows. His most successful contestant of the competition was Brucknell who made it to week six of the live shows before she was eliminated.

During the live shows of series eight, in an interview with former judge Minogue, Walsh stated that he did not know whether he would return as a judge in 2012. However, on 3 May 2012, Walsh confirmed he would return for his ninth series alongside Tulisa and Barlow. Former American X Factor judge Nicole Scherzinger who replaced Kelly Rowland joined Walsh, Contostavlos and Barlow as the new full-time judge for ninth series.

Walsh filled in for Cowell at the Kansas City auditions for season two of the American version while Cowell was recovering from bronchitis. He joined the other season two judges: L.A. Reid, Demi Lovato and Britney Spears, and was introduced with the line, "When Simon needs an opinion from someone he trusts, I'm the man he calls". His episode broke ratings records for the series.

Walsh returned for the tenth series and was joined by Barlow, Scherzinger and fellow original judge Osbourne, who replaced Tulisa. Due to being the only judge to remain for the whole ten years, he was awarded by being assigned the Boys category, instead of the Overs and Groups he was assigned to every year, since mentoring Shayne Ward in 2005. His category consisted of Nicholas McDonald, Luke Friend, and Sam Callahan. McDonald runner-up to Sam Bailey, mentored by Osbourne. Despite not winning, this was still by far Walsh's most successful year as a judge on the show due to going 5 weeks (breaking a record) without having any of his contestants in the bottom two and had two of them (Friend and McDonald) in the final.

In 2014, Walsh returned for the eleventh series, while Barlow, Osbourne and Scherzinger were replaced by former judges Cowell and Cole, and new judge Mel B. In 2015, Walsh stated that he was considering not returning to the twelfth series of The X Factor, citing his desire to return to full-time music management. After rumours circulated that he had been fired from the show, Walsh announced his decision to quit the show, stating that he had not been fired, but he was not "hanging around for them this year."

In 2016, Walsh returned as a judge to replace Nick Grimshaw for the thirteenth series, alongside Cowell, Osbourne (who replaced Cheryl) and Scherzinger (who replaced Rita Ora). The same judges returned for the fourteenth series. On 7 June 2018, Walsh announced he had decided not to return for the fifteenth series, in order to focus on music management and other commitments. "The show needs a change and I'm ready to leave," said Walsh in a statement. Walsh was replaced by Robbie Williams.

In 2019, Walsh along with Cowell and Scherzinger returned to The X Factor as judges in the newly created format The X Factor: Celebrity. He was mentor of the winner Megan McKenna, marking Walsh's third overall victory on the show.

=== Ireland's Got Talent ===
In May 2015, it was announced that Walsh would be launching a new Irish talent show, produced by Cowell, with himself as a judge, set to premiere in 2017 or 2018. Walsh stated that he would like to broadcast an Irish edition of Got Talent, though he stated that the untitled talent show was only in early development. Walsh later confirmed himself on ITV's This Morning as head judge on the show, Ireland's Got Talent, alongside judges Michelle Visage, Denise van Outen and Jason Byrne. The show launched on 3 February 2018 on TV3 and ran for two series before being cancelled in July 2019.

=== Junk Kouture ===
Walsh has been a judge on sustainable fashion programme Junk Kouture since 2014 and has been joined by celebrities such as Rosanna Davison, Vogue Williams and Michelle Visage on the judging panel in recent years.

=== Other television ===
In July 2011, he raced the "Reasonably Priced Car", a Kia Cee'd, during series 17 of Top Gear. On 1 September 2014, Walsh appeared on an episode of Who's Doing the Dishes? In January 2016, ITV announced that Walsh would appear in Drive, a new show which pitted eight celebrities against each other in a series of races in different vehicles. Hosted by Vernon Kay, the show began airing on 5 April 2016 In 2023 he was a guest on Channel 5's Eurovision: 30 Unforgettable Moments a chart countdown based on the song contest which also featured contributions from David and Carrie Grant, The Fizz and Johnny Logan, with footage from the 1980s' contest showing Walsh cheering on Logan included in the run time. In March 2024, Walsh entered the Celebrity Big Brother house as a housemate on the twenty-third series. During his stint in Celebrity Big Brother, Walsh revealed that he had survived a diagnosis of Waldenström macroglobulinemia, a rare form of blood cancer, in 2020 during the height of the COVID-19 pandemic. He reached the final and finished in fourth place.

== Groups and performers managed by Walsh ==
Act	Duration	Note(s)
Boyzone	1993–2000	
The Carter Twins	1996–1998	
Westlife	1998–2012; 2018–present	
Samantha Mumba	2000–2002	
Ronan Keating	2000–2003	
Bellefire	1999–2004	
Six	2001–2002	
Girls Aloud	2002–2004	
G4	2004–2007	
Shayne Ward	2005–2009	
Jedward	2009–2013	
Wonderland	2008–2011	
Union J	2013–2015	
Hometown	2013–2016	
Shane Filan	2012–present	
Myles and Connor	2012–present	
Next In Line	2022–present	

== Controversies ==
=== Ronan Keating ===
When Ronan Keating announced he wanted to take a break from Boyzone, Walsh continued to manage his career. Keating achieved a number one hit with "Life is a Rollercoaster" in 2000 while his album sold 4.4 million copies. Keating and Walsh later agreed to part company, and then had a bitter falling out. Walsh told the press, "[Keating] wasn't the most talented one – he's not a great singer and he's got no personality." Keating later told Closer magazine, "That man absolutely tried to ruin me and if he thinks we can ever hug and make up he can forget it. I haven't heard from him in three years and I wouldn't have a problem if I never saw him again. He's not a nice character." The feud between the two men had apparently ended by March 2008, and they helped select the finalists in the Groups category in The X Factor.

=== Louis Walsh v News Group Newspapers ===
Walsh sought access to documents which allegedly showed that The Sun UK tabloid paid €700 to a man who made a false sexual assault accusation against him. The man was later imprisoned for the false accusation. The senior counsel for Walsh told Ireland's High Court on 14 May 2012, "The Sun directed the operation to take out Louis Walsh as a public person." On 10 August 2012, the High Court ordered The Sun to give all documents and information to Walsh relating to the preparation of an article in The Sun entitled "Louis Probed Over 'Sex Attack' on Man in Loo". The article was published both in The Sun and their website on 23 June 2011. Walsh sued for defamation of character resulting from the false and malicious allegations and the case was settled out of court. Walsh was awarded damages of €500,000 and €180,000 costs on 28 November 2012. Despite winning the legal case, the false accusations had a "lasting effect" on Walsh who was, as of 2015, suffering from paranoid thoughts and panic attacks as a result of the ordeal.

=== Stephen Gately ===
Walsh was unaware of Stephen Gately being gay when he selected him for Boyzone and said in 2008 that, had he known, he would have thought twice before picking him. He elaborated that he might not have picked Gately because "it wasn't cool then to have a gay guy in a band".

=== Mel B ===
During an interview conducted by Sarah-Jane Crawford on The Xtra Factor during the semi-final results show in 2014, Walsh groped Mel B by her buttocks. Visibly irritated, she scolded and moved away from Walsh, who said he was only "looking after her". Crawford and the other judges, Cowell and Cheryl, tried to reassure her that she was "safe", while laughing off the gesture. After resurfacing on social media in July 2018, a few months after the Me Too movement began, the clip amassed millions of views on social media; it prompted discussion on the treatment of women by men, and drew condemnation of Walsh and the responses of Crawford, Cowell and Cheryl. Some viewers defended Walsh based on his alleged homosexuality and the justification that he was unaware of what he was doing, while others pointed out that, if it can happen so openly in a public setting, there is a correlation to how frequently it may happen behind closed doors. Walsh stated on 21 July 2018 that he grabbed Mel B's buttocks as a joke, but conceded that the gesture was no longer "politically correct" due to social media reaction.

=== Misha B ===
Misha B, a contestant from the 2011 series of The X Factor, stated in June 2020 that she had been a victim of racism and accusations made by Walsh and Tulisa, who were judges on the show at the time. She says that the producers and screenwriters created a narrative to make her appear to be a bully. The X Factor team announced that they would look into the matter.

== Awards and honours ==
- 2009 Mayo Person of the Year
- 2015 The Irish Post - Outstanding Contribution to Entertainment Award
