= Shayne Ward (album) =

Studio album by Shayne Ward
- Released: 17 April 2006
- Length: 49:16
- Labels: Syco; Sony BMG
- Producers: Cutfather & Joe; Jörgen Elofsson; David Kreuger; Steve Mac; Per Magnusson; Quiz & Larossi; Jonas Schrøder; Lucas Sieber; Nigel Wright

Shayne Ward chronology
Shayne Ward (2006)	Breathless (2007)

Singles from Shayne Ward
- 1. "That's My Goal" Released: 21 December 2005; 2. "No Promises" Released: 10 April 2006; 3. "Stand by Me" Released: 10 July 2006

Shayne Ward is the debut studio album by English singer Shayne Ward. It was released by Syco Music and Sony BMG on 17 April 2006 in the United Kingdom. The release of the album came five months after he won the second series of the British talent show The X Factor, with the recording process taking place between late 2005 and early 2006. Ward worked with a variety of producers on his debut, including Cutfather, Jörgen Elofsson, David Kreuger, Steve Mac, Quiz & Larossi, and Nigel Wright.

== Promotion ==
The album produced three singles, including "That's My Goal", "No Promises" and "Stand by Me." Initially released on 17 April 2006, Shayne Ward was later re-released on 18 December 2006, with the addition of a bonus DVD. The album was not issued in Japan until 2007, and the lead single in the region consisted of a double A-side of "That's My Goal" and "No Promises." A new video for "That's My Goal" was filmed for the release. In November 2022, the album was released on vinyl record for the first time.

== Critical reception ==
Professional ratings
Review scores
Source	Rating
AllMusic	3/5 stars
RTÉ.ie	3/5 stars
Yahoo! Music UK	7/10

Linda McGee, writing for RTÉ.ie, found that Shayne Ward "is pretty much your typical pop record. It's polished, filled with soft, gushy ballads and is therefore very easy to listen to – think Backstreet Boys-meets-Westlife [...] All in all, this isn't half bad for a debut." Similarly, Sharon Mawer from AllMusic wrote: "Having four months to record and polish an album was still no guarantee of quality, however, and Ward delivered an album of ballads in the style of every boy band since the mid-'90s, with songs interchangeable from those on albums by Take That, Boyzone, Westlife, and Blue."

== Commercial performance ==
Shayne Ward debuted at number one on both the Irish Albums Chart and the UK Albums Chart. It was certified Silver, Gold and Platinum by the British Phonographic Industry (BPI) on 21 April 2006. The same year, the album reached 4× Platinum in Ireland for shipments figures in excess of 60,000 copies. By November 2015, Shayne Ward had sold 538,918 copies in the United Kingdom.

== Track listing ==
International standard edition and LP edition
No.	Title	Writer(s)	Producer(s)	Length
1.	"That's My Goal"	Jörgen Elofsson; Jem Godfrey; Bill Padley	David Kreuger; Per Magnusson	3:41
2.	"No Promises"	Jonas Schrøder; Lucas Sieber	Cutfather & Joe; Sieber; Schrøder	3:44
3.	"Stand by Me"	Andreas Romdhane; Savan Kotecha	Quiz & Larossi	4:15
4.	"All My Life"	Karla Bonoff	Steve Mac	4:26
5.	"You're Not Alone"	Joe Belmaati; Mich Hansen; Sieber; Schrøder	Cutfather & Joe	3:53
6.	"I Cry"	Elofsson; Kreuger; Magnusson	Kreuger; Magnusson	4:21
7.	"What About Me"	Garry Frost; Frances Swan	Steve Mac	3:22
8.	"Back at One"	Brian McKnight	Mac	3:37
9.	"Someone to Love"	Anders Bergström; Elofsson	Kreuger; Magnusson; Elofsson	4:10
10.	"Something Worth Living for"	Kotecha; Romdhane; Josef Larossi	Quiz & Larossi	4:07
11.	"A Better Man"	Kotecha; Larossi	Quiz & Larossi	4:14
12.	"Next to Me"	Belmaati; Hansen; Remee; Ali Tennant	Cutfather & Joe	3:06

Digital expanded re-issue bonus tracks
No.	Title	Writer(s)	Producer(s)	Length
13.	"Easy to Love You"	Shayne Ward; Cliff Maderson; Graham Stack	Stack	3:14
14.	"Hit the Ground Running"	Ward; Maderson; Stack	Stack	3:41

European bonus track
No.	Title	Writer(s)	Producer(s)	Length
13.	"Over the Rainbow" (Live on The X Factor)	Harold Arlen; Yip Harburg	Nigel Wright	2:20

Japanese limited edition bonus tracks
No.	Title	Writer(s)	Producer(s)	Length
14.	"Easy to Love You"	Ward; Maderson; Stack	Stack	3:14
15.	"Hit the Ground Running"	Ward; Maderson; Stack	Stack	3:41
16.	"That's My Goal" (Music video)			3:41
17.	"No Promises" (Music video)			3:44

Japanese deluxe edition bonus tracks
No.	Title	Writer(s)	Producer(s)	Length
14.	"If You're Not the One" (Live on The X Factor)	Daniel Bedingfield; Mark Taylor	Tom Foster	2:16
15.	"Right Here Waiting" (Live on The X Factor)	Richard Marx; David Cole	Foster	1:32
16.	"Unchained Melody" (Live on The X Factor)	Alex North; Hy Zaret; Phil Spector	Foster	2:08
17.	"A Million Love Songs" (Live on The X Factor)	Gary Barlow	Foster	5:05
18.	"Easy to Love You"	Ward; Maderson; Stack	Stack	3:14
19.	"Hit the Ground Running"	Ward; Maderson; Stack	Stack	3:41

Japanese deluxe edition bonus DVD
No.	Title	Length
1.	"That's My Goal" (Music video)	3:41
2.	"No Promises" (Music video)	3:44
3.	"Stand by Me" (Music video)	4:15
4.	"That's My Goal" (International music video)	3:41
5.	"Stand by Me" (Making of the video)	2:00

== Charts ==
=== Weekly charts ===
Weekly chart performance for Shayne Ward
Chart (2006)	Peak position
Irish Albums (IRMA)	1
Scottish Albums (Official Charts)	1
South African Albums (RISA)	2
Swedish Albums (Sverigetopplistan)	8
UK Albums (Official Charts)	1

=== Year-end charts ===
Year-end chart performance for Shayne Ward
Chart (2006)	Position
UK Albums (OCC)	35

== Certifications ==
Certifications for Shayne Ward
Region	Certification	Certified units/sales
Ireland (IRMA)	4× Platinum	60,000^{^}
United Kingdom (BPI)	Platinum	538,918
^{^} Shipments figures based on certification alone.
