= Savan Kotecha =

American songwriter and record producer (born 1978)

- Born: Savan Harish Kotecha; August 28, 1978 (age 48); Austin, Texas, U.S.
- Occupations: Songwriter; record producer; vocal coach
- Labels: Mr. Kanani; Jive; RCA; Capitol; LaFace; Island; BMG; Atlantic; Syco; Columbia; Visva; Republic
- Members: Ariana Grande; Demi Lovato; Usher; PrettyMuch; Carrie Underwood; Britney Spears; One Direction; Justin Bieber; Normani; Shontelle; Adam Lambert; Leona Lewis; Cher Lloyd; Alexandra Burke; Westlife; Katy Perry; Shayne Ward; Hilary Duff; Jolin Tsai; Max Martin

Savan Harish Kotecha (born August 28, 1978) is an American record producer and songwriter. He was the executive music producer of the 2020 film Eurovision Song Contest: The Story of Fire Saga, for which he wrote and produced several songs and performed one song.

== Personal life ==
Kotecha is of Indian Gujarati descent.

== Notable songs ==
Some of the artists for whom Kotecha has co-written notable songs include:

- Lizzo ("2 Be Loved")
- Ariana Grande ("Problem", "Break Free", "Love Me Harder", "One Last Time", "Focus", "Into You", "Side to Side", "Bang Bang", "No Tears Left to Cry", "God Is a Woman", "Breathin", "Break Up with Your Girlfriend, I'm Bored")
- Katy Perry ("Rise")
- Emblem3 ("Chloe (You're the One I Want)")
- Westlife ("Obvious", "Amazing", "Us Against the World", "Beautiful in White")
- The Weeknd ("Can't Feel My Face", "In The Night")
- Ellie Goulding ("Love Me like You Do", "On My Mind", "Close to Me")
- Usher ("DJ Got Us Fallin' in Love")
- Maroon 5 ("One More Night")
- Britney Spears ("I Wanna Go", "If U Seek Amy")
- One Direction ("What Makes You Beautiful", "One Thing")
- Jessie J, Ariana Grande, and Nicki Minaj ("Bang Bang")
- Christina Aguilera ("Your Body")
- Demi Lovato ("Confident", "Cool For the Summer")
- Shayne Ward ("No U Hang Up", "Breathless")
- JLS ("The Club Is Alive")
- Vanessa Hudgens ("Say OK")
- Liam Payne ("Sunshine")
- Ed Sheeran ("Sapphire, "Symmetry")
- December 10 (‘’Run My Way’’)

== Discography ==
Adam Lambert

- "If I Had You" (US CHR #15)
- "Evil in the Night"
- "The Original High"
- "Things I Didn't Say"

Alexandra Burke

- "Start Without You" (UK #1)
- "What Happens on the Dance Floor"
- "Broken Heels" (UK #8)
- "The Silence" (UK #16)
- "Dumb"
- "Gotta Go"

Allison Iraheta

- "Friday I'll Be Over U"
- "Just Like You"

Ariana Grande

- "Problem" (featuring Iggy Azalea) (US #2) (UK #1)
- "Break Free" (featuring Zedd) (US #4) (UK #16)
- "Bang Bang" (with Jessie J and Nicki Minaj) (US #3) (UK #1)
- "Love Me Harder" (featuring The Weeknd) (US #7) (UK #48)
- "Santa Tell Me" (US Holiday Song Chart #1) (US #9) (UK #8)
- "One Last Time" (US #13) (UK #2)
- "Focus" (US #7) (UK #10)
- "Into You" (US #13) (UK #14)
- "Side to Side" (featuring Nicki Minaj) (US #4) (UK #4)
- "Everyday" (featuring Future) (US #55) (UK #123)
- "Greedy"
- "Sometimes"
- "Bad Decisions"
- "Touch It"
- "They Don't Know"
- "No Tears Left To Cry" (US #3) (UK #2)
- "God Is a Woman" (US #8) (UK #4)
- "Everytime" (US #62)
- "Breathin" (US #12) (UK #8)
- "Bloodline" (US #22)
- "Bad Idea" (US #27)
- "Ghostin" (US #25)
- "Break Up with Your Girlfriend, I'm Bored" (US #2) (UK #1)
- "Don't Call Me Angel" (US #13) (UK #2)
- "Bad to You" (with Normani and Nicki Minaj)
- "Nobody" (with Chaka Khan)
- "How I Look on You"
- "Bye" (US #25)
- "Don't Wanna Break Up Again" (US #28)
- "Saturn Returns Interlude"
- "Yes, And?" (US #1)
- "We Can't Be Friends (Wait for Your Love)" (US #1)
- "I Wish I Hated You" (US #39)
- "Imperfect for You" (US #37)
- "Twilight Zone" (US #18)
- "Dandelion" (US #38)
- "Past Life" (US #53)
- "Hampstead" (US #54)

Avicii

- "Sunset Jesus"

Backstreet Boys

- "In a World Like This"
- "Bottle Up"

BC Jean

- "I’ll Survive You"

Britney Spears

- "I Wanna Go" (US #7) (US POP/CHR #1)
- "Up n’ Down"
- "If U Seek Amy" (US #19)

Carolina Liar

- "All That Comes Out Of My Mouth"

Carrie Underwood

- "Quitter"
- "Inside Your Heaven" (US #1)

Cassadee Pope

- "Easier To Lie"

Celine Dion

- "Eyes on Me"
- "Let Your Heart Decide"

Cher Lloyd

- "Want U Back" (UK #25) (US #12)
- "Grow Up (feat. Busta Rhymes)"
- "Over The Moon"
- "Dirty Love"
- "With Ur Love" (UK #4)
- "I Wish" (feat. T.I.) (US #117)
- "M.F.P.O.T.Y"
- "Killing It"
- "Alone With Me"

Charlie Puth

- "Empty Cups"

Christian TV

- "Love2Baby"

Christina Aguilera

- "Your Body" (US #34) (UK #16)
- "Let There Be Love"

Dannii Minogue

- "Love Fight"
- "Vibe On"

Days Difference

- "Speakers" (#29 Hot AC)

Delta Goodrem

- "I Can't Break It to My Heart" (AUS #13)

Demi Lovato

- "Really Don't Care" (feat. Cher Lloyd) (US #26) (US Top 40 #7)
- "Something That We're Not"
- "Shouldn't Come Back"
- "Cool for the Summer" (UK #7) (US #11)
- "Confident" (US #21)
- "Stars"

Ellie Goulding

- "Love Me Like You Do" (UK #1) (US #3)
- "On My Mind" (UK #5) (US #13)
- "Codes"
- "Don't Need Nobody"
- "Army"
- "Close to me"

Enrique Iglesias

- "Ring My Bells"

Emblem3

- "Chloe (You're the One I Want)" (US #93)
- "Spaghetti"
- "Teenage Kings"

Fifth Harmony

- "Better Together"

G-Eazy feat. Jeremih

- "Saw It Coming"

Geri Halliwell

- "Ride It" (UK #4)

Glee

- "Loser like Me" (US #6)
- "Light Up the World" (US #33)

Hilary Duff

- "All About You" (US Mainstream Top 40 - #38)

Il Divo

- "Sempre Sempre"
- "Una Noche"
- "Mama"

Jennifer Lopez

- "First Love" (US CHR: 20)

Jessie James

- "I Look So Good (Without You)" (US CHR #43)
- "Burn It Up"

Jessie J

- "Bang Bang" (with Ariana Grande and Nicki Minaj)

JLS

- "The Club Is Alive" (UK #1)

Jolin Tsai

- "36 Tricks of Love" (爱情三十六計) (Taiwan #1) (Taiwan Radio #1) (China #1)

Jordan Pruitt

- "My Shoes" (Radio Disney #11)

Justin Bieber

- "Beauty and a Beat" (featuring Nicki Minaj) (US #5)

Katy Perry

- "Rise" (US #11)
- "Witness"

Ke$ha

- "All That Matters (The Beautiful Life)"

Laza Morgan

- "One by One"

Leona Lewis

- "I Got You" (UK #14)
- "Brave"
- "Naked"
- "Outta My Head"

Lesley Roy

- "Psycho B**ch"

Liam Payne

- "Sunshine"

Lizzo

- "2 Be Loved"

Lindsay Lohan

- "Disconnected"
- "Symptoms Of You"

Miranda Cosgrove

iCarly Soundtrack

- "Stay My Baby" (Radio Disney #19)
- "Oh Oh"

Madonna

- "Devil Pray"
- "Addicted"
- "Borrowed Time"

Maluma

- "Tu Vecina" (featuring Ty Dolla Sign)

Maneskin

- "Feel"
- "If Not For You"

Maroon 5

- "One More Night" (US #1)

Megan & Liz

- "Release You"

MKTO

- "Forever Until Tomorrow"

Natalie La Rose

- "Around the World" (featuring Fetty Wap)

Nick Jonas

- "Under You"

Normani

- "Motivation" (US #33) (UK #27)
- "Bad to You" (with Ariana Grande and Nicki Minaj)

Prince Royce

- "Back It Up" (feat. Pitbull) (US #98) (Grammy Nominated)

One Direction

- "Live While We're Young" (US #3) (UK #3)
- "What Makes You Beautiful" (US #4) (UK #1)
- "Na Na Na"
- "I Wish"
- "Up All Night"
- "Save You Tonight"
- "Kiss You" (UK #9) (US #19)
- "One Thing" (UK #9)
- "Heart Attack"
- "Last First Kiss"
- "Back For You"
- "Nobody Compares"
- "Still The One"
- "Change My Mind"
- "Magic"
- "Happily"

Paul Potts

- "Mamma"

Paula DeAnda

- "Roll The Credits" (US CHR #37)

PrettyMuch

- "Would You Mind"
- "Teacher"
- "Open Arms"
- "No More"
- "Me Necesita" (feat. CNCO)

R5

- "Let's Not Be Alone Tonight"

Robin Thicke

- "Back Together" (feat. Nicki Minaj)

Sage The Gemini feat. Nick Jonas

- "Good Thing" (US #78)

Sam Smith

- "How Do You Sleep?" (US #24) (UK #7)

Shayne Ward

- "If That's OK with You" (UK #2)
- "No U Hang Up" (UK #2)
- "Breathless" (UK #6)
- "Damaged"
- "Some Tears Never Dry"
- "Until You"
- "Melt the Snow"
- "U Got Me So"
- "You Make Me Wish"
- "Stand by Me" (UK #14)
- "Something Worth Living For"
- "A Better Man"

Shontelle

- "T Shirt" (US #36) (UK #6)

Skip Marley

- "Lions"
- "Calm Down"

Tammin Sursok

- "Pointless Relationship" (AUS #5)
- "Whatever Will Be" (AUS #13)
- "Almost Me"

The Vamps

- "Somebody To You" (UK #4)

Tori Kelly

- "Nobody Love" (US #60)
- "Expensive"
- "California Lovers"

Tata Young

- "Sexy, Naughty, Bitchy"
- "Call Him Mine"

Usher

- "DJ Got Us Falling In Love" (US #4)
- "Scream" (US #9) (UK #5)

Victoria Justice

- "Beggin' on Your Knees" (US #58)
- "Best Friend's Brother" (US #86)

Vanessa Hudgens

- "Say OK" (US #61)
- "Whatever Will Be" (Tammin Sursok cover)

The Weeknd

- "Can't Feel My Face" (US #1)
- "In the Night" (US #12)
- "Shameless"
- "Rockin'"
- "Love to Lay"
- "A Lonely Night"
- "Ordinary Life"

Westlife

- "Where We Are"
- "No More Heroes"
- "Us Against the World" (UK #8)
- "Something Right"
- "The Easy Way"
- "Pictures In My Head"
- "Amazing" (UK #4)
- "Colour My World"
- "Hit You With The Real Thing"
- "Maybe Tomorrow"
- "Miss You When I’m Dreaming"
- "Still Here"
- "Obvious" (UK #3)
- "Heal"
- "When a Woman Loves a Man"
- "I Get Weak"

== Awards and nominations ==
Kotecha has been the recipient of nine BMI Awards, 23 ASCAP Awards and two Billboard Music Awards, among others.

Year	Award	Category	Work	Result	Ref(s)
2016	Golden Globe Awards	Best Original Song	"Love Me like You Do"	Nominated	
2016	Grammy Awards	Best Song Written for Visual Media	"Love Me like You Do"	Nominated	
2020	Grammy Awards	Album of the Year	Thank U, Next	Nominated	
2021	Grammy Awards	Best Compilation Soundtrack	Eurovision Song Contest: The Story of Fire Saga	Nominated	
2021	Academy Awards	Best Original Song	"Husavik"	Nominated	
