= No Promises (Bryan Rice song) =

2005 single by Bryan Rice

Single by Bryan Rice

from the album Confessional
- Released: 21 October 2005
- Length: 3:52
- Label: Boom!, EMI
- Songwriters: Jonas Schrøder, Lucas Sieber
- Producer: Chief 1

Bryan Rice singles chronology
"No Promises" (2005)	"Homeless Heart" (2006)

"No Promises" is a song by Danish singer Bryan Rice from his debut studio album, Confessional (2006). A common misunderstanding Is that, the song was recorded by Rice for the soundtrack of the Danish comedy film Nynne (2005). The song was a hit in Denmark in 2005 and 2006, peaking at number one on the Danish Airplay Chart. "No Promises" was the fourth-most-performed work by Danish songwriters in Denmark between 2000 and 2009 according to Danish performance-rights organisation KODA. The song had international success in a Shayne Ward cover, peaking at number two in the UK in 2006.

== Chart performance ==
The song spent three non-consecutive weeks at number one on the Danish Airplay Chart. The song did not chart on the singles chart, because the chart did not allow singles only available as digital download to chart until 2007. In January 2007, "No Promises" was certified platinum by IFPI Denmark for sales of 15,000 digital downloads.

== Track listings ==
- Digital download
1. "No Promises" – 3:52
- Digital download (remix)
1. "No Promises (remix)" (Weekend Wonderz club mix) – 6:25
- CD promo (remixes)
1. "No Promises" (Weekend Wonderz edit)
2. "No Promises" (Weekend Wonderz club mix)

== Charts ==
Chart (2006)	Peak position
Denmark Airplay (Tracklisten)	1

== Certifications ==
Region	Certification	Certified units/sales
Denmark (IFPI Danmark)	Platinum	8,000^{^}
^{^} Shipments figures based on certification alone.

== Shayne Ward version ==
"No Promises"

Single by Shayne Ward

from the album Shayne Ward
- B-side: "Unchained Melody" (live), "A Million Love Songs" (live)
- Released: 10 April 2006
- Length: 3:44
- Label: Syco Music, Sony BMG
- Songwriters: Jonas Schrøder, Lucas Sieber
- Producers: Cutfather & Joe, Lucas Sieber, Jonas Schrøder

Shayne Ward singles chronology
"That's My Goal" (2005)	"No Promises" (2006)	"Stand by Me" (2006)

Music video
- "No Promises" on YouTube

"No Promises" was covered by the second United Kingdom X Factor winner Shayne Ward. The cover was released on 10 April 2006 and reached number two on the UK Singles Chart. It became Ward's second number-one single in Ireland and was the 10th best-selling single of 2006 there, and it was also successful in Sweden, peaking at number four in August 2006. It has sold over 200,000 copies in the UK, earning it a silver certification from the British Phonographic Industry.

The video features Allie Crandell, who appeared alongside Whitney Port in her MTV spin-off The City. "No Promises" was performed on the last regular editions of CD:UK and Top of the Pops Reloaded in 2006.

=== Track listings ===
UK CD single

1. "No Promises"
2. "Unchained Melody" (live on The X Factor)
3. "A Million Love Songs" (live on The X Factor)
4. "Chat with Shayne"

European CD single

1. "No Promises"
2. "Easy to Love You"

=== Charts ===
==== Weekly charts ====
Chart (2006)	Peak position
Czech Republic Airplay (ČNS IFPI)	27
Europe (Eurochart Hot 100)	8
Ireland (IRMA)	1
Norway (VG-lista)	13
Scotland Singles (OCC)	2
Slovakia Airplay (ČNS IFPI)	34
Sweden (Sverigetopplistan)	4
UK Singles (OCC)	2

==== Year-end charts ====
Chart (2006)	Position
Ireland (IRMA)	10
Sweden (Hitlistan)	36
UK Singles (OCC)	16

=== Certifications ===
Region	Certification	Certified units/sales
United Kingdom (BPI)	Silver	200,000^{^}
^{^} Shipments figures based on certification alone.
