= Breathless (Shayne Ward song) =

2007 single by Shayne Ward

Single by Shayne Ward

from the album Breathless
- B-side: "Gonna Be Alright"
- Released: 19 November 2007
- Label: Sony BMG; Syco
- Songwriters: Rami; Savan Kotecha; Arnthor Birgisson
- Producers: Rami; Arnthor

Shayne Ward singles chronology
"No U Hang Up" / "If That's OK with You" (2007)	"Breathless" (2007)	"Gotta Be Somebody" (2010)

"Breathless" is a song by English singer Shayne Ward. It was released on 19 November 2007 as the second and final single from his second studio album, Breathless (2007). It peaked at number six on the UK Singles Chart and number two on the Irish Singles Chart.

== Background and promotion ==
"Breathless" tells a tale about a woman who is so wonderful, she can take a man's breath away. Ward conceived the song possibly during his relationship with his then-girlfriend Faye McKeever.

Promotion for the single was very limited; which would explain the relatively moderate chart position of the song when compared to his previous singles. The only live performances shown to the public were when Ward performed the song during the results show in the fourth series of The X Factor on 10 November 2007, BBC Switch: Sound on 17 November 2007, and on The Paul O'Grady Show on 19 November 2007.

== Legacy ==
On Valentine's Day 2008, "Breathless" was announced as number two on the UK's greatest love songs of all time.

== Charts ==
=== Weekly charts ===
Chart (2007–2008)	Peak position
Japan (Japan Hot 100)	90
Ireland (IRMA)	2
Scottish Singles Sales (Official Charts)	3
UK Singles (Official Charts)	6

=== Year-end charts ===
Chart (2007)	Position
UK Singles (OCC)	90

== Certifications ==
Certifications for "Breathless"
Region	Certification	Certified units/sales
United Kingdom (BPI)	Silver	200,000^{‡}
^{‡} Sales+streaming figures based on certification alone.
