= No U Hang Up =

2007 single by Shayne Ward

Single by Shayne Ward

from the album Breathless
- A-side: "If That's OK with You"
- Released: 24 September 2007
- Studio: Maratone (Stockholm, Sweden)
- Length: 4:22
- Label: Sony BMG
- Songwriters: Arnthor Birgisson; Rami Yacoub; Savan Kotecha
- Producers: Arnthor Birgisson; Rami Yacoub

Shayne Ward singles chronology
"Stand by Me" (2006)	"No U Hang Up" / "If That's OK with You" (2007)	"Breathless" (2007)

"No U Hang Up" is a song written by Arnthor Birgisson, Rami Yacoub and Savan Kotecha and performed by The X Factor winner, Shayne Ward. The song was released as a double A-side single along with "If That's OK with You", peaking at number two on the UK Singles Chart and reaching the top 20 in Denmark and Ireland. The song was described as invoking the image of "KFC wrappers blowing around in the doorway of JJB Sports".

== Chart performance ==
Although the single was released as double A-side, the official Irish chart company, IRMA, did not combine the two singles when they charted, due to two different digital singles being available separately. "If That's OK with You" charted at number one, while "No U Hang Up" entered at number 14, later climbing to number 11. In the UK, the single entered the chart at number two, giving Ward his third and final top-five hit.

=== Weekly charts ===
Chart (2007)	Peak position
Denmark (Tracklisten)	4
Europe (Eurochart Hot 100)	7
Ireland (IRMA)	11
Scottish Singles Sales (Official Charts)	1
Sweden (Sverigetopplistan)	38
UK Singles (Official Charts)	2

=== Year-end charts ===
Chart (2007)	Position
UK Singles (OCC)	42

== Certifications ==
Region	Certification	Certified units/sales
United Kingdom (BPI)	Silver	200,000^{‡}
^{‡} Sales+streaming figures based on certification alone.
