= Breathless (Shayne Ward album) =

Studio album by Shayne Ward
- Released: 26 November 2007
- Length: 43:38
- Labels: Syco; Sony BMG
- Producers: Rami Yacoub; Arnthor Birgisson; Jonas Jeberg; Cutfather; AJ Junior; Paul Meehan; Justin Trugman; Ryan Tedder

Shayne Ward chronology
Shayne Ward (2006)	Breathless (2007)	Obsession (2010)

Singles from Breathless
- 1. "If That's OK with You" Released: 19 August 2007; 2. "No U Hang Up" Released: 19 August 2007; 3. "Breathless" Released: 19 November 2007

Breathless is the second studio album by English singer Shayne Ward. It was released through Syco Music and Sony BMG on 26 November 2007 in the United Kingdom. Ward reteamed with previous collaborators Rami Yacoub, Arnthor Birgisson and Savan Kotecha to work on most of the material. Additional producers on the album include Jonas Jeberg, Cutfather, AJ Junior, and Ryan Tedder.

The album earned largely mixed reviews from music critics but was commercially successful, debuting at number one on the Irish Albums Chart, while also reaching number two on the UK Albums Chart. Two singles were released from the album, one of which was a double A-side. Breathless earned a platinum certification in the United Kingdom and went five times platinum in Ireland.

== Background ==
Ward worked on the album for nearly a year and a half, longer than he had spent on his previous solo album and The X Factor put together. Ward described the album as a more "funky, sexy and different step from him." Producers Rami Yacoub, Arnthor Birgisson, and Ryan Tedder also worked on the album. The first single from the album, "If That's OK with You" / "No U Hang Up", was released to radio on 7 September 2007. The video for "If That's OK With You" were premiered on 18 August 2007. On 14 September, the single was released physically, and the video for "No U Hang Up" was released via Channel 4 and Ward's official YouTube page. The single reached number two in the Britain and number eleven in Ireland.

The second and final single from the album was "Breathless", which was released on 19 November 2007. Television promotion included appearances on the fourth series of The X Factor on 10 November 2007 and The Paul O'Grady Show on 19 November 2007. The single entered the UK Singles Chart at No. 2 on 25 November 2007. During the release of "Breathless", it was announced that Ward was planning a six-month-long British tour to support the album. The tour started in Glasgow, Scotland on 12 May 2008 and eventually ended in Ireland on 29 December 2008, following extra dates being added. The tour visited cities such as London, Sheffield, Aberdeen and Manchester.

== Critical reception ==
Professional ratings
Review scores
Source	Rating
AllMusic	3/5 stars
Digital Spy	3/5 stars
The Times	3/5 stars
Virgin Media	1.5/5 stars
Yahoo! Music UK	5/10 stars

The album has received mixed reviews from music critics. Times Online gave the album three out of five stars, stating "With chart battles involving producers rather than artists, poor Ward finds himself fighting it out with the big budget likes of Justin Timberlake in the sweet voice stakes." Similarly, AllMusic editor Sharon Mawer noted that Breathless was "vastly different" from Ward's debut album and found that much of the "uptempo R&B numbers" were "more akin to Justin Timberlake."

The BBC gave the album a mixed-to positive review, calling it "an album that sums up the predicament of the reality pop star. Having taken the fast track to the big time, Shayne has no style of his own and is open to the whims of his production team." Nick Levine from Digital Spy felt that "large portions of Breathless, they're crippled by the dry, stale whiff of anonymity." Andy Strickland from Yahoo! Music UK wrote that "the overwhelming fact about ##Breathless## is that not one of these songs will be around long enough for next year's X Factor auditionees to bother learning them. There's nothing here to match the calibre of song that Ward sang to get here in the first place."

== Commercial performance ==
On 2 December 2007, the album reached number one in the Irish Albums Chart, knocking Leona Lewis's Spirit off the top. It debuted at number two in the UK Albums Chart selling 95,801 in its first week, being held off by Lewis On 31 October 2007, an official Breathless DVD, which included exclusive interviews and five music videos, was released via Woolworths stores in the UK, and by the end of the year, Breathless had reached 5× Platinum in Ireland. By September 2009, the album had sold over 450,000 copies in the UK.

== Track listing ==
Breathless track listing
No.	Title	Writer(s)	Producer(s)	Length
1.	"No U Hang Up"	Rami Yacoub; Arnthor Birgisson; Savan Kotecha	Rami; Arnthor	4:22
2.	"Breathless"	Yacoub; Birgisson; Kotecha	Rami; Arnthor	3:47
3.	"If That's OK with You"	Birgisson; Kotecha; Max Martin	Arnthor	3:36
4.	"Damaged"	Yacoub; Birgisson; Kotecha	Rami; Arnthor	4:03
5.	"Stand by Your Side"	Remee; John Reid; Joe Belmaati; Mich Hansen	Jonas Jeberg; Cutfather	3:39
6.	"Until You"	Yacoub; Birgisson; Kotecha	Rami; Arnthor	4:08
7.	"Some Tears Never Dry"	Yacoub; Birgisson; Kotecha	Rami; Arnthor	3:49
8.	"Melt the Snow"	Yacoub; Birgisson; Kotecha	Rami; Arnthor	3:47
9.	"Tangled Up"	Evan Rogers; Carl Sturken	Rami; Arnthor; AJ Junior	3:53
10.	"Just Be Good to Me"	James Harris III; Terry Lewis	Brian Rawling; Paul Meehan	3:45
11.	"U Got Me So"	Yacoub; Birgisson; Kotecha	Rami; Arnthor	3:38
12.	"You Make Me Wish"	Yacoub; Birgisson; Kotecha	Rami; Arnthor	3:56
13.	"Tell Him"	Ryan Tedder; Justin Trugman; Kotecha; Ashraf Jannusi	Trugman; Tedder	3:59
Total length:				43:38

Deluxe edition – bonus tracks
No.	Title	Writer(s)	Producer(s)	Length
14.	"If That's OK With You" (Moto Blanco Remix)	Birgisson; Kotecha; Martin	Arnthor; Moto Blanco^{[a]}	9:19
15.	"Breathless" (The Snowflakers Remix)	Yacoub; Birgisson; Kotecha	Rami; Arnthor; Snowflakers^{[a]}	3:46
16.	"Gonna Be Alright"	Tedder	Tedder	4:23

Deluxe Edition Bonus DVD
No.	Title	Length
1.	"If That's OK With You" (Music Video)	3:36
2.	"No U Hang Up" (Music Video)	4:21
3.	"Breathless" (Music Video)	3:47
4.	"No Promises" (Music Video)	3:44

Breathless: The DVD
No.	Title	Length
1.	"Interview"	20:00
2.	"That's My Goal" (Video)	3:41
3.	"No Promises" (Video)	3:44
4.	"Stand by Me" (Video)	4:21
5.	"If That's OK with You" (Video)	3:36
6.	"No U Hang Up" (Video)	4:21

Notes

- ^{^[a]} denotes remix producer

== Charts ==
=== Weekly charts ===
Weekly chart performance for Breathless
Chart (2007–2008)	Peak position
Danish Albums (Hitlisten)	39
Irish Albums (IRMA)	1
Scottish Albums (Official Charts)	3
UK Albums (Official Charts)	2

=== Year-end charts ===
Year-end chart performance for Breathless
Chart (2007)	Position
UK Albums (OCC)	27

== Certifications ==
Certifications for Breathless
Region	Certification	Certified units/sales
Ireland (IRMA)	5× Platinum	75,000^{^}
United Kingdom (BPI)	Platinum	300,000^{^}
^{^} Shipments figures based on certification alone.

== Release history ==
Breathless release history
Region	Date	Edition	Ref(s)
United Kingdom	26 November 2007	Standard	
Japan	2 February 2008	Standard	
Asia	4 November 2008	Special	

== See also ==
- The Breathless Tour 2008
