= If That's OK with You =

2007 single by Shayne Ward

Single by Shayne Ward

from the album Breathless
- A-side: "No U Hang Up"
- Released: 24 September 2007
- Studio: Maratone (Stockholm, Sweden)
- Length: 3:42
- Label: Sony BMG
- Songwriters: Savan Kotecha; Arnthor Birgisson; Max Martin

Shayne Ward singles chronology
"Stand by Me" (2006)	"If That's OK with You" / "No U Hang Up" (2007)	"Breathless" (2007)

"If That's OK with You" is a song written by Savan Kotecha, Arnthor Birgisson and Max Martin for The X Factor winner Shayne Ward from his second studio album, Breathless. It was released as his fourth single overall, a double A-side with "No U Hang Up". Although due to be released on 19 August 2007 as the first single from Breathless, its relative underperformance on radio triggered a decision to push the single back until its eventual release with a song that received a more favourable reaction, "No U Hang Up" on 24 September.

== Music video ==
Directed by Wayne Isham, the video shows Shayne and his friends hanging out at a pool party.

== Chart performance ==
On September 30, the single peaked at No. 2 in the UK Singles Chart, beaten to the top by the Sugababes's "About You Now". It has sold 150,000 copies in the UK. It reached No. 1 in the Irish Singles Chart, a separate peak from that of "No U Hang Up" due to the digital singles being released separately in Ireland. It remained atop of the Irish chart for a total of four weeks.

In the UK, "If That's OK with You" sold 33,400 copies when it charted at No. 2 and a week later it fell to No. 3, selling 25,600 copies. The next week, it fell to No. 4 on sales of 16,000 and then fell to No. 10 with 12,000 sales. It has sold 143,525 in the UK and finished 2007 as the United Kingdom's 42nd-biggest seller.

== Charts ==
=== Weekly charts ===
Chart (2007–2008)	Peak position
Czech Republic Airplay (ČNS IFPI)	4
Europe (Eurochart Hot 100)	7
Ireland (IRMA)	1
Scottish Singles Sales (Official Charts)	1
Slovakia Airplay (ČNS IFPI)	49
Sweden (Sverigetopplistan)	45
UK Singles (Official Charts)	2

=== Year-end charts ===
Chart (2007)	Position
Ireland (IRMA)	6
UK Singles (OCC)	42

== Certifications ==
Region	Certification	Certified units/sales
United Kingdom (BPI)	Silver	200,000^{‡}
^{‡} Sales+streaming figures based on certification alone.
