= That's My Goal =

2005 single by Shayne Ward

Single by Shayne Ward

from the album Shayne Ward
- Released: 21 December 2005
- Recorded: 2005
- Genre: Pop
- Length: 3:40
- Label: Syco; Sony BMG
- Songwriters: Jörgen Elofsson; Jem Godfrey; Bill Padley
- Producers: Per Magnusson; David Kreuger

Shayne Ward singles chronology
"That's My Goal" (2005)	"No Promises" (2006)

"That's My Goal" is the debut single by British singer Shayne Ward, the winner of the second series of The X Factor. It was released as his winner's single on 21 December 2005. Ward was the first X Factor winner to release an original song as his winner's single; all other winners released a cover version of another song, until Matt Terry's "When Christmas Comes Around" in 2016. "That's My Goal" was later included on Ward's debut studio album, Shayne Ward (2006).

The song sold 313,000 copies in its first two days of sales, making it the fastest-selling song of 2005. It sold a further 429,180 copies in this four-day period, which was more than enough to secure the 2005 Christmas number one. It remained at the top of the UK Singles Chart for a total of four weeks and stayed in that chart for five months. It has been certified platinum by the British Phonographic Industry for sales of over 600,000 copies. "That's My Goal" remains the fastest-selling X Factor winner's single of all time and the third fastest-selling song of all time in the United Kingdom.

== Background and release ==
"That's My Goal" was written by Jörgen Elofsson, Jem Godfrey and Bill Padley and produced by Per Magnusson and David Kreuger. It was first heard in the final of the second series of The X Factor, where it was performed by both Ward and eventual runner-up, Andy Abraham. The single was released via digital download straight after Ward won, but the CD single was not released until 21 December 2005, which was a Wednesday. This was unusual as most new singles are released on a Monday to gain maximum sales for the UK Singles Chart the following Sunday. The late release was because the CD single was not yet ready when Ward was announced as the winner on Saturday 17 December, and delaying the song's release until the next week would mean the song would not be a contender for the Christmas number one.

== Chart performance ==
The song sold 313,000 copies in its first two days on sale, making it the third fastest-selling single of all time in the UK (behind Elton John's "Candle in the Wind 1997" and Will Young's "Evergreen"). On 25 December 2005, after selling more than 742,000 that week, it debuted at number one on the UK Singles Chart and became the 2005 Christmas number one. This made Ward the first X Factor winner to achieve the Christmas number one spot, as Band Aid 20's version of "Do They Know It's Christmas?" took the title in 2004. "That's My Goal" sold a further 132,000 the following week and stayed at number one. The song made it three weeks at the top on 8 January 2006, selling 54,192 copies that week. In its fourth week of release, the song was again top of the UK charts, selling 31,724 copies to bring its total to 960,360. On 22 January, "That's My Goal" was finally knocked off the top spot by Arctic Monkeys' "When the Sun Goes Down".

"That's My Goal" was the second biggest-selling single of 2005 in the UK, beaten only by "(Is This the Way to) Amarillo" by Tony Christie and Peter Kay. With first-week sales of over 742,000 copies, it is also the fastest-selling X Factor winner's single. As of 2015, it also is the third biggest selling winner's single, having sold 1,103,351 copies.

In the Republic of Ireland, the song debuted at number three on the Irish Singles Chart on 22 December 2005, behind a novelty version of "Leave Right Now" by Mario Rosenstock (a parody of the original by Will Young) and "JCB" by Nizlopi. The following week it rose to number two, with "JCB" rising to number two. In its third week, however, "That's My Goal" finally gained the number one spot and remained there for a total of seven weeks. The song also reached number 58 in Sweden.

== Track listing ==
1. "That's My Goal" – 3:40
2. "If You're Not the One" (live on The X Factor) – 2:16
3. "Right Here Waiting" (live on The X Factor) – 1:32

== Charts ==
=== Weekly charts ===
Chart (2005–2006)	Peak position
Europe (Eurochart Hot 100)	4
Ireland (IRMA)	1
Scottish Singles Sales (Official Charts)	1
Sweden (Sverigetopplistan)	58
UK Singles (Official Charts)	1

=== Year-end charts ===
Chart (2005)	Position
Ireland (IRMA)	12
UK Singles (OCC)	2

Chart (2006)	Position
Europe (Eurochart Hot 100)	62
Ireland (IRMA)	3
UK Singles (OCC)	18

== Certifications ==
Region	Certification	Certified units/sales
United Kingdom (BPI)	2× Platinum	1,100,000

== See also ==
- List of million-selling singles in the United Kingdom
