= Shayne Ward =

English singer (born 1984)

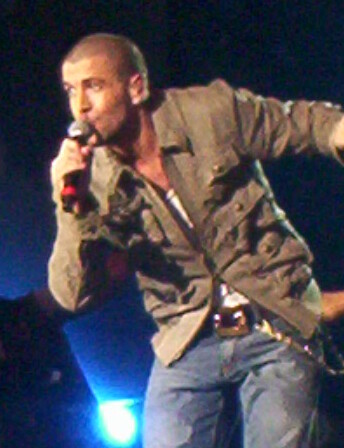
- Ward performing during the Shayne Ward Live 2007 tour.
- Born: Shayne Thomas Ward; 16 October 1984 (age 42); Tameside, Greater Manchester, England
- Occupations: Singer; actor
- Years active: 2005–present
- Partner(s): Sophie Austin (2016–present; engaged)
- Children: 2
- Musical career
- Origin: Manchester, England
- Genres: Pop; R&B
- Instrument: Vocals
- Works: Shayne Ward discography
- Labels: Sony Music; Syco; MPG

Shayne Thomas Ward (born 16 October 1984) is an English singer and actor. He rose to fame as the winner of the second series of The X Factor. His debut single, "That's My Goal", was released in the United Kingdom on 21 December 2005 and reached number one on the UK singles chart and was that year's Christmas number one. It sold 313,000 copies on its first day of sales, making it the third-fastest-selling single of all time in the UK, behind Elton John's "Candle in the Wind 1997" and Will Young's "Evergreen", which sold 685,000 and 400,000 copies in their first days of sale, respectively.

Ward was the first X Factor winner to release an original song as his winner's single. His prize, as winner, was a recording contract with Simon Cowell's Syco record label, which is co-owned by Sony Music. His eponymous debut album was released in April 2006. It debuted at number one on both the Irish and UK Albums Charts, going 4× Platinum in Ireland and Platinum in the UK. It spawned two hit singles: "No Promises" and "Stand by Me". The follow-up album, Breathless, featuring the top 10 hits "If That's OK with You" and "No U Hang Up", was released in November 2007 and topped the Irish charts, where it went 5× Platinum.

In November 2010, after a three-year hiatus, Ward released his third album, Obsession. In contrast to Shayne Ward and Breathless, it underperformed with first-week sales of under 23,000, and missed the top 10 in both the UK and Ireland. In 2011, Ward was dropped by Syco. In 2015, he released a new album Closer as an independent artist, funded through PledgeMusic. In 2015, he began appearing as Aidan Connor in TV's Coronation Street as a regular character. He made his last appearance in August 2018. He made a voiceover appearance on 22 October 2021. In 2023, he began appearing in The Good Ship Murder.

== Early life ==
Ward was born on 16 October 1984 in Tameside, Greater Manchester, England to Irish Traveller parents who settled in the United Kingdom. He attended St. Peter’s RC High School in Manchester. In 2002, he reached the final thirty of Popstars: The Rivals. Prior to his participation in The X Factor, Ward was in a band called Destiny with Tracy Murphy and Tracey Lyle, performing at pubs, clubs and weddings.

== Career ==
=== 2005–2008: The X Factor, Shayne Ward and Breathless ===
In early 2005, Ward auditioned for the second series of The X Factor in front of judges Simon Cowell, Sharon Osbourne and Louis Walsh. He impressed all three judges and passed through to the next round. His category, 16 to 24-year-olds, was then mentored by Walsh, and Ward was chosen to be among Walsh's top four contestants and perform on the live shows. Ward quickly became the bookmakers' favourite to win the show, and after making it to the grand final, he defeated Cowell's duo Journey South and Osbourne's over-25 singer Andy Abraham and was crowned as the winner. He had not fallen into the bottom two throughout the entire competition, and won by a margin of 1.2% of the vote, out of a reported 10.8 million phone votes cast by viewers. Immediately after the competition, his X Factor mentor Walsh became his manager under a joint venture with Global Publishing and Walsh Global Management.

The X Factor performances and results (2005)
Show	Song choice	Result
Audition	"Sacrifice" – Elton John	Through to bootcamp
Bootcamp (Part 1)	"Unchained Melody" – The Righteous Brothers	Through to next day of bootcamp
Bootcamp (Part 2)	"I'll Be There" – The Jackson 5	Through to judges' houses
Judges' houses	"The Air That I Breathe" – The Hollies	Through to live shows
Live show 1	"Right Here Waiting" – Richard Marx	Safe
Live show 2	"If You're Not the One" – Daniel Bedingfield	Safe
Live show 3	"Summer of '69" – Bryan Adams	Safe
Live show 4	"You Make Me Feel Brand New" – The Stylistics	Safe
Live show 5	"Cry Me a River" – Justin Timberlake	Safe
Live show 6	"A Million Love Songs" – Take That	Safe
Live show 7	"I Believe in a Thing Called Love" – The Darkness	Safe
Quarter-Final	"Take Your Mama" – Scissor Sisters	Safe
Quarter-Final	"Careless Whisper" – George Michael	Safe
Semi-Final	"If Tomorrow Never Comes" – Garth Brooks	Safe
Semi-Final	"Unchained Melody" – The Righteous Brothers	Safe
Final	"If You're Not the One" – Daniel Bedingfield	Winner
Final	"When a Child Is Born" – Johnny Mathis	Winner
Final	"Over the Rainbow" – Judy Garland	Winner
Final	"That's My Goal"	Winner

Immediately after his victory on The X Factor, Ward signed a recording contract with Syco Music and his first single, "That's My Goal", was released in the UK on Wednesday, 21 December 2005. After selling 742,000 copies in the first week, including 313,000 on its first day, it became the Christmas number one single of 2005, held the top spot for four weeks and stayed in the top 75 until June 2006, a 21-week run. It became, at that time the fourth-fastest-selling UK single of all time, beaten only by Elton John's "Candle in the Wind", Will Young's "Anything Is Possible/Evergreen", and Gareth Gates' "Unchained Melody" which sold 685,000, 403,000 and 335,000 copies in their first days of sale, respectively. To date, "That's My Goal" has sold over 1.3 million copies in the UK. Ward also won an Ivor Novello Award for being the Best Selling Single. Ward's second single, "No Promises", a cover of a Bryan Rice song was released on 10 April 2006, and peaked at number two (behind "Crazy" by Gnarls Barkley) in the UK Singles Chart. Shayne Ward, his self-titled debut album was released on 17 April 2006. It sold 201,266 copies in the first week and entered the albums chart at number one. To date, the album has sold 520,000 copies in the UK and a further 2,000,000 worldwide, reaching number one in eight other countries. The album was certified platinum. Ward's third single was "Stand by Me".

It was confirmed in Gary Barlow's autobiography My Take, that in 2006, fellow Take That member, Jason Orange threatened to quit the band, and Ward was seriously considered as his replacement. Orange, however, later changed his mind and a replacement was not required. In August 2006, it was reported that Ward had developed vocal cord nodules — the same condition that stopped the singing career of Julie Andrews — and was to be flown out to Los Angeles in early September to see a specialist surgeon. Walsh released a statement that he was confident Ward would be fine and would be back at work by the end of the month. Ward had a successful treatment and was indeed able to return to his singing career. In November 2006, he released his autobiography entitled My Story. He travelled to several places around the UK for book signings, which hundreds of people attended. In early 2007, Ward embarked on a solo tour of UK & Republic of Ireland venues, taking in eighteen concerts in twenty-eight days from late January to mid-February. The tour commenced in Dublin on 21 January and ended in Birmingham on 17 February 2007.

After the completion of his successful debut tour, Ward's fourth single and first from his second album, "If That's OK with You" was given a release date of 20 August 2007, but was then delayed and became a double A-side single with "No U Hang Up". It was finally released on 24 September 2007, and charted at number two in the UK being held off by the Sugababes with "About You Now". "No U Hang Up" and "If That's OK with You" charted separately in Ireland, the former reaching number eleven and the latter entering at number one. Ward's second album, Breathless, was released on 26 November 2007, and after selling over 95,000 copies in its first week, debuted at number two on the UK Albums Chart, held off the top spot by his X Factor successor, Leona Lewis's, multi-platinum selling debut, Spirit. In Ireland, the album debuted at number one, removing Lewis's album from the top spot, a position it held for three weeks, and was later certified five times platinum. The second single from Ward's album was announced as "Breathless", and was released on 19 November 2007. It peaked at number six in the UK and number two in Ireland. On 10 November, Ward performed "Breathless" on the live results show of the fourth series of The X Factor, although the single was not available for download until 18 November, followed by a performance on The Paul O'Grady Show on 19 November. In the UK the album has been certified platinum with sales of over 450,000. In May 2008, Ward embarked on his month-long UK tour, The Breathless Tour 2008. He made his stage debut at London's O2 Arena and visited his home town Manchester at the MEN Arena. He also performed his complete show as a support act for Westlife's 2008 tour in front of a crowd of over 80,000 at Ireland's Croke Park. Ward also played on the opening night at The O2, Dublin, at the Cheerios Childline concert on 16 December 2008.

=== 2009–2015: Closer and other projects ===
Ward began working on his third album in 2009 with producers RedOne and Taio Cruz. The album, titled Obsession, was released on 15 November 2010. The singer worked with songwriters such as Savan Kotecha, Quiz & Larossi and Lucas Secon, while the songs produced by RedOne and Taio Cruz were not included. The first single from the album is a cover version of Nickelback's 2008 single, "Gotta Be Somebody". Ward's version was released on 7 November 2010 and reached number 12 in the UK and number 10 in Ireland. The video for the song premiered on 29 October 2010 and he performed the song on The X Factor on 7 November. Ward also performed at the Miss World Pageant, which was held in Sanya, China. He did his first television appearance in over two years, on Live from Studio Five the day after his X Factor appearance, where he also performed his single. The album reached number 11 in Ireland on 19 November and peaked at number 15 in the UK on 21 November. On 8 March 2011, Ward performed the title track from the album Obsession on The Alan Titchmarsh Show. In an interview with Digital Spy Ward stated that he hoped he could release a second single from the album.

On 9 June 2011, it was announced that Ward would star as Stacee Jaxx in 1980s-themed musical Rock of Ages at the Shaftesbury Theatre, London. For this role, Ward received a nomination for The DEWYNTERS London Newcomer of the Year award from the 2012 What's on Stage Awards. He announced that he would return to the studio in September 2012, after the end of his contract with Rock of Ages. In February 2014, Ward released a version of "Falling Slowly" with Louise Dearman. In 2014, Ward joined the cast of Jeff Wayne's Musical Version of The War of the Worlds for the final arena tour of that production, as the Artilleryman.

On 19 September 2014, Ward announced was working on a new album with Mike Stock, with a then-projected release of February 2015 through PledgeMusic. Ward later postponed the release to April, with the video for the first single "My Heart Would Take You Back", due to be filmed on 25 February 2015 in London. The album was released in April 2015 and peaked at No.17 in the UK albums chart. It featured two further singles; "The Way You Were" and "Moving Target".

=== 2015–2023: Coronation Street and new music ===
On 12 May 2015, ITV announced they had signed Ward to a one-year contract deal to appear on Coronation Street as Aidan Connor, a "distant cousin of Michelle who grew up on the same estate as her and knicker boss Carla Connor". He made his on-screen debut in August 2015. For his performance, he received 2016 National Television Award and 2016 Inside Soap Award, both for the Best Newcomer. His contract was renewed the following year due to the character's popularity and he continued in the role for another two years.

In early 2018, Ward announced that he was leaving the role. He made his last appearance as Aidan Connor on 7 May 2018, in a storyline highlighting male suicide. The storyline gained much attention from the press. Ward has also spoken of his significant weight gain during his time on the show. He revealed that he gained three stone (42 lbs) and said that the tempting canteen food at Granada studios was partly to blame, although he was largely unconcerned by negative comments he received regarding this. He subsequently slimmed-down towards the end of his time on the show.

After leaving the show, he was cast as a lead in the film, Stairs, a psychological drama. Upon release, however, the film was titled The Ascent, with its US title being Black Ops.

In November 2022, it was announced that Ward would be releasing a compilation retrospective of his musical career to date, titled Anthology, which was released 9 December 2022. In an interview with Retro Pop Magazine, Ward shared that he had begun work on his next studio album, which was following a more country pop approach.

In 2023, he began appearing in The Good Ship Murder.

=== 2024-present: Strictly Come Dancing ===
From 14 September 2024, Ward starred in series 22 of Strictly Come Dancing, partnering with Nancy Xu. On 10 November 2024, Ward was voted off by the show's judges to become the seventh celebrity to be eliminated from the competition.

== Personal life ==
From 2012 to 2014, Ward was engaged to actress Faye McKeever.

On 2 August 2016, Ward announced he and his partner, former Hollyoaks actress Sophie Austin were expecting their first child. On 3 December 2016 their first child, a daughter, was born. In December 2017, Ward announced his engagement to Austin. On 11 June 2022, their second child, a boy, was born. Ward and Austin had previously been told they were expecting a baby girl, leaving Ward to remark that their son's birth had left the couple "overjoyed and blessed".

== Discography ==
- Shayne Ward (2006)
- Breathless (2007)
- Obsession (2010)
- Closer (2015)

== Filmography ==
Year	Title	Role	Notes
2005	The X Factor	Contestant	Series 2 winner
2013	Dancing on Ice	Himself (Contestant)	Series 8
2015–2018	Coronation Street	Aidan Connor	367 episodes
2019	The Ascent	Will Stanton	US titled Black Ops
2020	G-Loc	Jimmy	
2023–present	The Good Ship Murder	Jack Grayling	16 episodes
2024	Doctors	Kenny Webb	Guest
2024	Strictly Come Dancing	Himself (Contestant)	Series 22

== Awards and nominations ==
Year	Award	Category	Nominee/work	Result	Ref.
2016	National Television Award	Newcomer	Coronation Street	Won	
2016	British Soap Award	Best Newcomer	Coronation Street	Nominated	
2016	TV Choice Award	Best Soap Newcomer	Coronation Street	Won	
2016	Inside Soap Award	Best Newcomer	Coronation Street	Won	
2016	Inside Soap Award	Sexiest Male	Coronation Street	Nominated	
2018	British Soap Award	Best Actor	Coronation Street	Longlisted	
2018	TV Choice Award	Best Soap Actor	Coronation Street	Nominated	
2018	Inside Soap Award	Best Actor	Coronation Street	Nominated	
2018	TVTimes Award	Favourite Soap Star	Coronation Street	Nominated	
2018	Digital Spy Reader Award	Best Male Actor	Coronation Street	Fifth	
2025	TVTimes Award	Favourite On-Screen Partnership (with Catherine Tyldesley)	The Good Ship Murder	Nominated	

Preceded by Steve Brookstein	Winner of The X Factor; 2005	Succeeded by Leona Lewis
