= Stand by Me (Shayne Ward song) =

2006 single by Shayne Warde

Single by Shayne Ward

from the album Shayne Ward
- B-side: "Easy to Love You", "Hit the Ground Running"
- Released: 10 July 2006
- Recorded: 2006
- Length: 4:14
- Label: Sony BMG
- Songwriters: Kotecha, Romdhane

Shayne Ward singles chronology
"No Promises" (2006)	"Stand by Me" (2006)	"If That's OK with You" / "No U Hang Up" (2007)

"Stand by Me" is the third single from the second United Kingdom X Factor winner, Shayne Ward. It was released in the UK on 10 July 2006 and is an original track from his debut album, Shayne Ward. The song failed to match the success of his previous singles and charted at number 14 on the UK Singles Chart.

== Track listing ==
1. "Stand by Me" (single mix) – 4:24
2. "Easy to Love You" – 3:14
3. "Hit the Ground Running" – 3:41

== Charts ==
Chart (2006)	Peak position
European Hot 100 Singles (Billboard)	42
Ireland (IRMA)	9
Scotland Singles (OCC)	6
UK Singles (OCC)	14
