= Fuera de Clase =

Former Venezuelan pan-Latin youth band

Fuera de Clase (meaning outside the class) also known by its initials as FDC was a Venezuelan pan-Latin musical formation of youth with its own repertoire of songs and dance routines. The formation formed in the early 2000s by artist development producers Ruben Ferrer Rubio and Johnny Nuñez, had a lineup made up of six young performers, Silverio Lozada, Emilio Vizcaino, Luis Fernando Sosa, Hector Astudillo, Marco Verde and Richard Anthony Jones.

The formula of original musical materials written by professional songwriters, rigorous dance training and marketing of a fashionable urban look found resonance with a young base of Latin adolescents and kids in Venezuela and all over Latin and Central America and FDC became one of the biggest acts with a wide fan base. It released a number of recordings by singer Ricardo Montaner's own recording label "Hecho a Mano", and was famous for a great number of hits in Spanish, including "Late mi corazón", "Ella se muere por mi", "Loca historia de amor", "Solo basta una mirada", "Complices de tu amor", "Hello Hello", amongst many. Releases at many times were accompanied with music videos. Fuera de Clase performed a number of Latin entertainment television shows, music festivals and took part in a series of live tours.

== After break-up ==
Many members of Fuera de Clase tried to continue with their solo musical and acting careers after the folding of the formation. Silverio Lozada, a singer-songwriter released a number of solo hits. Emilio Vizcaino became part of the Venezuelan merengue boy band Calle Ciega. Luis Fernando Sosa became a television actor appearing in a number of popular Latin television series known as telenovelas. He also became part of the Venezuelan boy band Uff!. Hector Astudillo and Marco Verde were also involved in music projects in Venezuela.

Richard Anthony Jones had a brief stay with the boy band Uff! before joining an international boyband project called Streetwize that initially included Lee Mulhern and Donal Skehan (from Ireland), Lee Hutton (from England) and Jonathan Fagerlund from Sweden. As Skehan and Fagerlund left the project, Richard Anthony Jones identified as Antonio Jones joined in as the Venezuelan leg of the international project alongside Kyle Carpenter, an American who was also included to further the global appeal of the project. Streetwize (renamed Stateside and later Access All Areas) folded after a while without major releases.
