= List of number-one singles of 2009 (Ireland) =

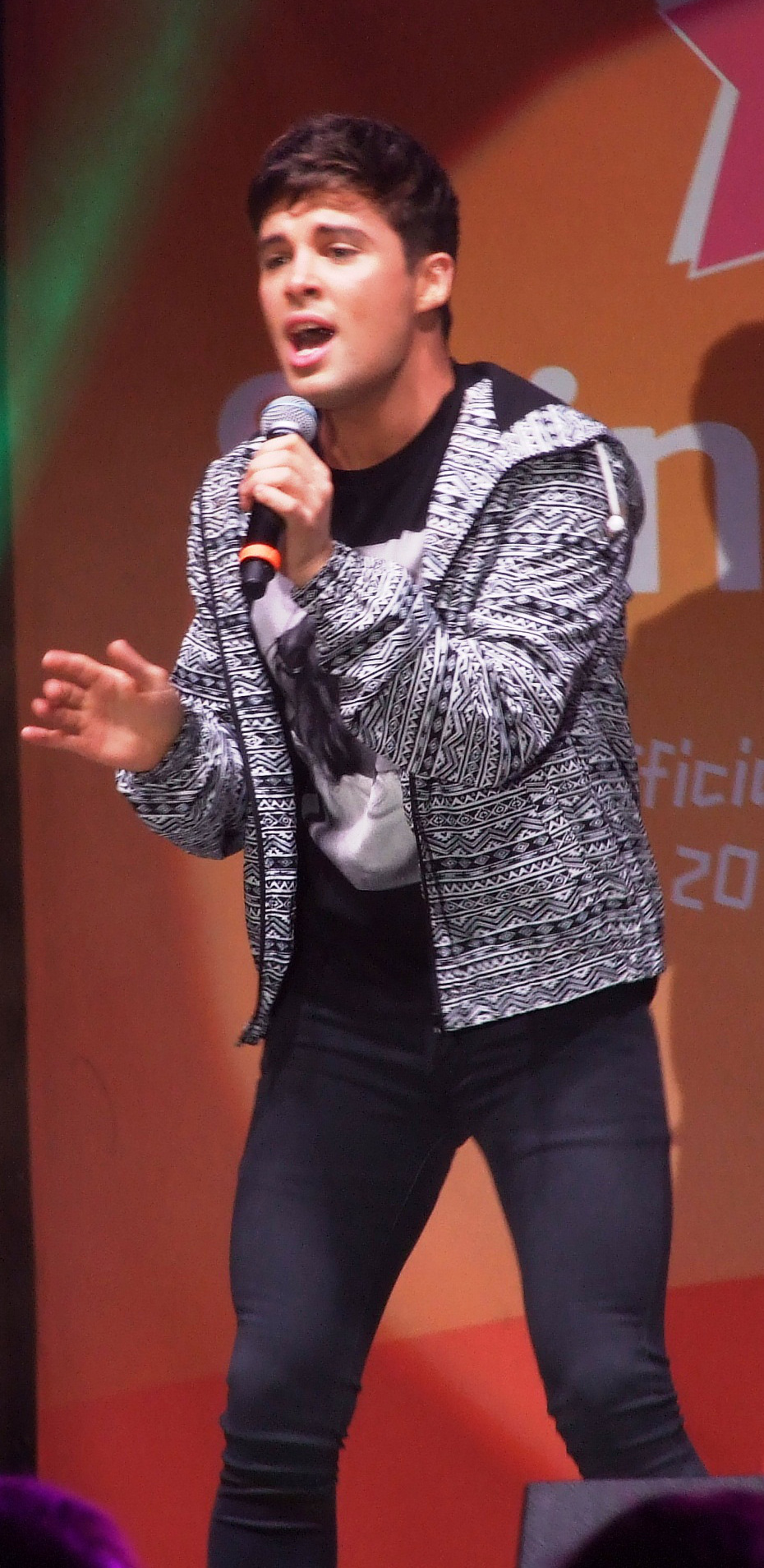
The X Factor winner Joe McElderry's debut single The Climb (song) was the Christmas number one of 2009

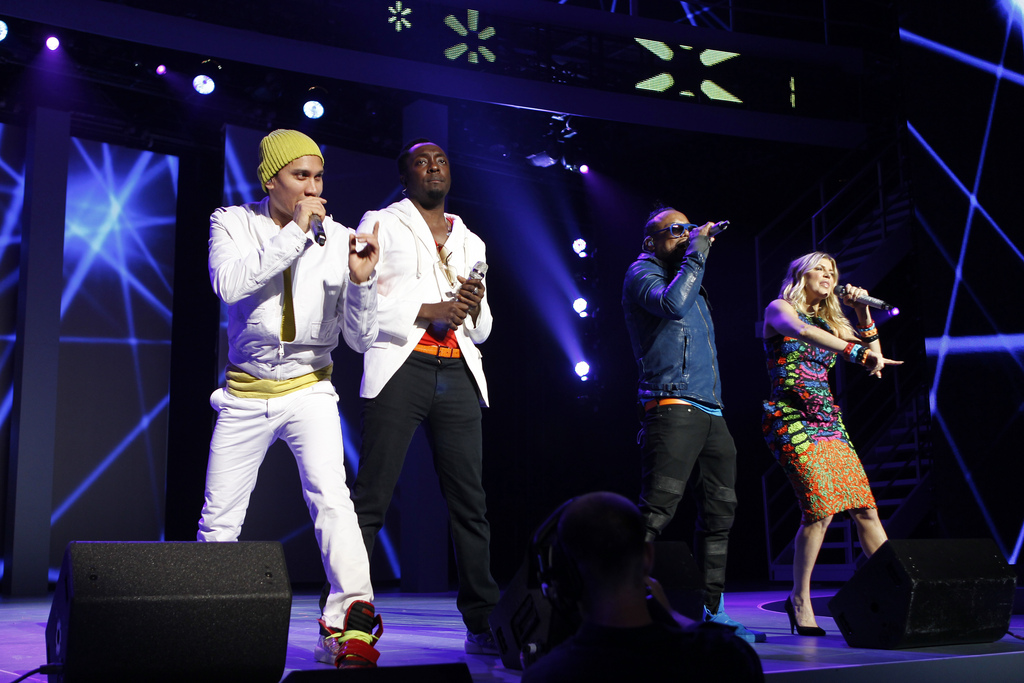
The Black Eyed Peas stayed at number one for 12 weeks with I Gotta Feeling

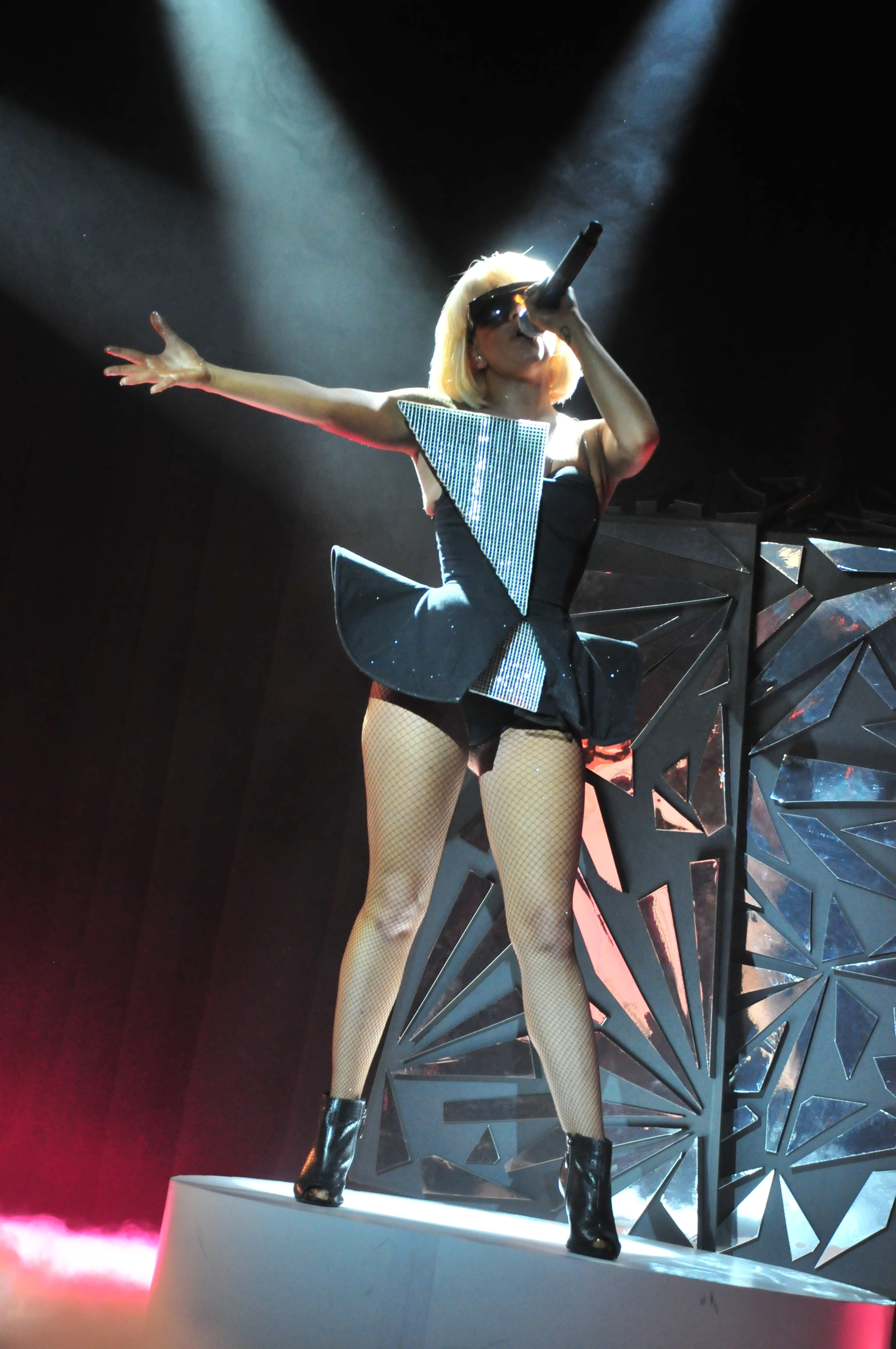
Lady Gaga gained three number one in 2009 with Just Dance, Poker Face and Bad Romance.

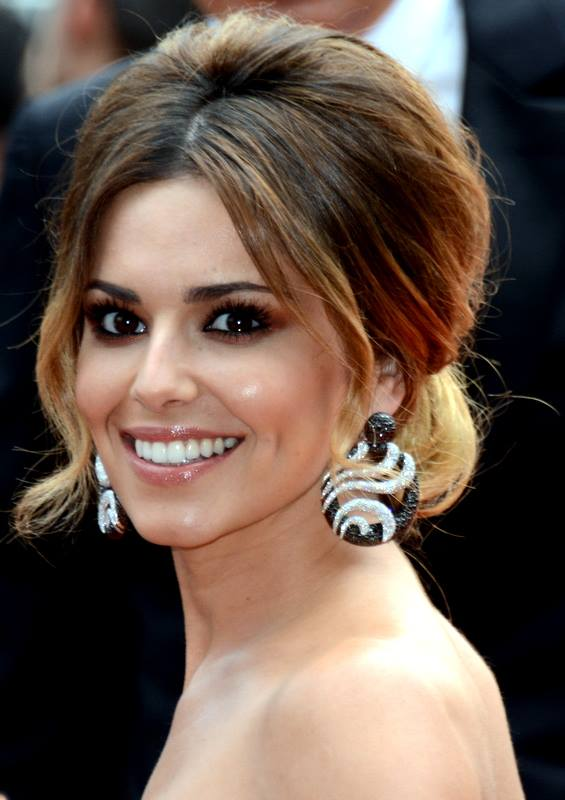
Cheryl Cole's debut single, Fight for This Love, stayed at number one for four consecutive weeks

This is a list of the IRMA's Irish Singles Chart Top 50 number-ones of 2009.

Issue date	Song	Artist	ref
1 January	"Hallelujah"	Alexandra Burke	
8 January	"Hallelujah"	Alexandra Burke	
15 January	"Just Dance"	Lady Gaga featuring Colby O'Donis	
22 January	"Just Dance"	Lady Gaga featuring Colby O'Donis	
29 January	"Just Dance"	Lady Gaga featuring Colby O'Donis	
5 February	"Just Dance"	Lady Gaga featuring Colby O'Donis	
12 February	"Just Dance"	Lady Gaga featuring Colby O'Donis	
19 February	"Get On Your Boots"	U2	
26 February	"Poker Face"	Lady Gaga	
5 March	"Poker Face"	Lady Gaga	
12 March	"Do You Believe"	Julie-Anne Dineen	
19 March	"Right Round"	Flo Rida featuring Ke$ha	
26 March	"Right Round"	Flo Rida featuring Ke$ha	
2 April	"Right Round"	Flo Rida featuring Ke$ha	
9 April	"Jai Ho! (You Are My Destiny)"	A.R. Rahman & The Pussycat Dolls featuring Nicole Scherzinger	
16 April	"Jai Ho! (You Are My Destiny)"	A.R. Rahman & The Pussycat Dolls featuring Nicole Scherzinger	
23 April	"We Made You"	Eminem	
30 April	"Poker Face"	Lady Gaga	
7 May	"Number 1"	Tinchy Stryder featuring N-Dubz	
14 May	"Number 1"	Tinchy Stryder featuring N-Dubz	
21 May	"Number 1"	Tinchy Stryder featuring N-Dubz	
28 May	"Number 1"	Tinchy Stryder featuring N-Dubz	
4 June	"Number 1"	Tinchy Stryder featuring N-Dubz	
11 June	"Untouched"	The Veronicas	
18 June	"When Love Takes Over"	David Guetta featuring Kelly Rowland	
25 June	"My Baby's Waiting"	Industry	
2 July	"When Love Takes Over"	David Guetta featuring Kelly Rowland	
9 July	"When Love Takes Over"	David Guetta featuring Kelly Rowland	
16 July	"I Gotta Feeling"	The Black Eyed Peas	
23 July	"I Gotta Feeling"	The Black Eyed Peas	
30 July	"I Gotta Feeling"	The Black Eyed Peas	
6 August	"I Gotta Feeling"	The Black Eyed Peas	
13 August	"I Gotta Feeling"	The Black Eyed Peas	
20 August	"I Gotta Feeling"	The Black Eyed Peas	
27 August	"Burn"	Industry	
3 September	"I Gotta Feeling"	The Black Eyed Peas	
10 September	"I Gotta Feeling"	The Black Eyed Peas	
17 September	"I Gotta Feeling"	The Black Eyed Peas	
24 September	"I Gotta Feeling"	The Black Eyed Peas	
1 October	"I Gotta Feeling"	The Black Eyed Peas	
8 October	"I Gotta Feeling"	The Black Eyed Peas	
15 October	"Bad Boys"	Alexandra Burke featuring Flo Rida	
22 October	"Fight for This Love"	Cheryl Cole	
29 October	"Fight for This Love"	Cheryl Cole	
5 November	"Fight for This Love"	Cheryl Cole	
12 November	"Fight for This Love"	Cheryl Cole	
19 November	"You Are Not Alone"	The X Factor Finalists 2009	
26 November	"You Are Not Alone"	The X Factor Finalists 2009	
3 December	"You Are Not Alone"	The X Factor Finalists 2009	
10 December	"Bad Romance"	Lady Gaga	
17 December	"The Climb"	Joe McElderry	
24 December	"The Climb"	Joe McElderry	
31 December	"The Climb"	Joe McElderry	

== See also ==
- 2009 in music
- List of artists who reached number one in Ireland
- Irish Singles Chart
