= Vienna Transport Museum Remise =

Coordinates: 48°11′48″N 16°24′30″E

- Das Verkehrsmuseum Remise
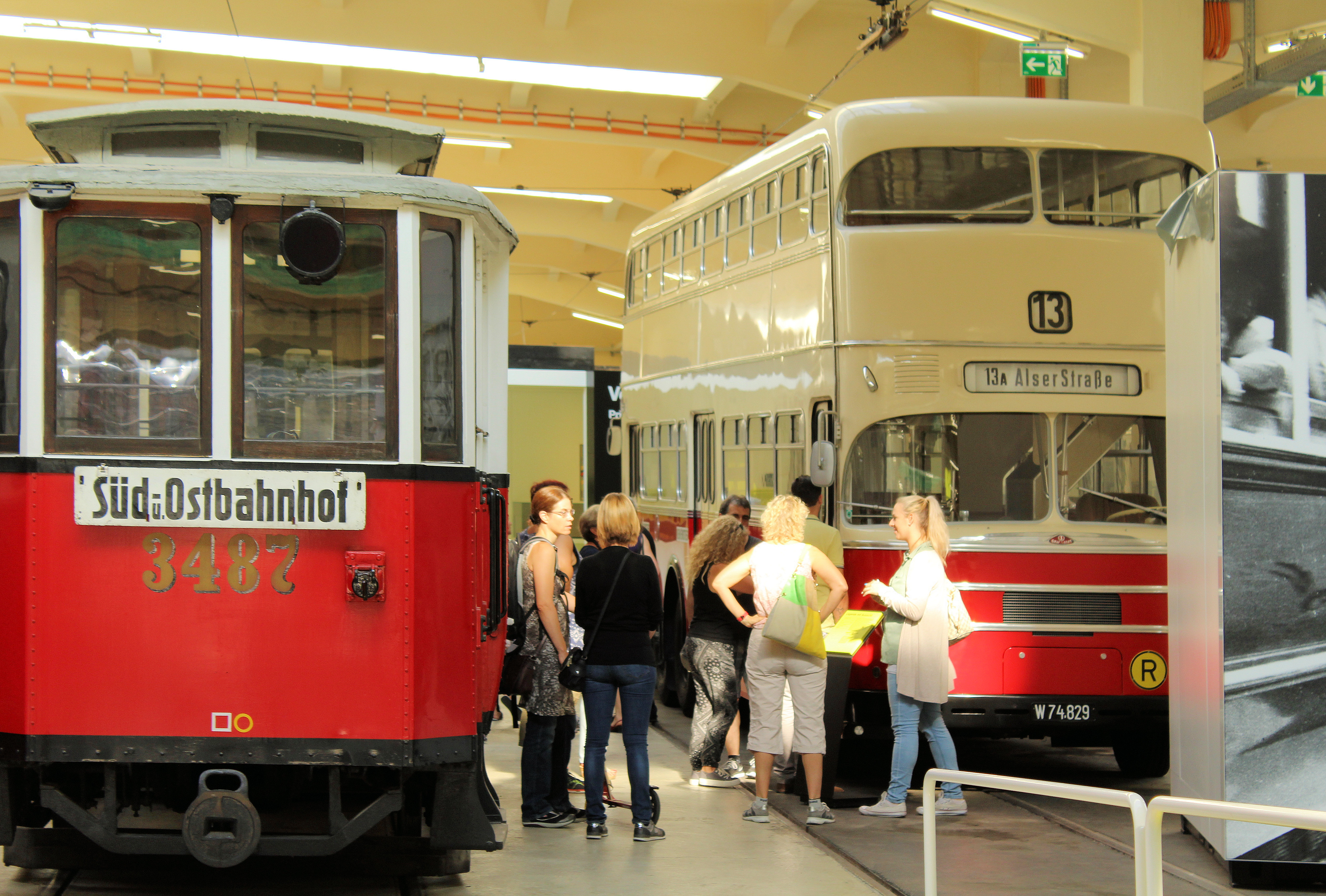
- Former name: Viennese Tram Museum
- Location: Ludwig-Koessler-Platz, 1030 Vienna, Austria
- Type: Transport museum
- Owner: Wiener Linien
- Website: www.wienerlinien.at/museum

The Vienna Transport Museum "Remise" (German: Das Verkehrsmuseum Remise), formerly the Viennese Tram Museum, is a museum in Vienna, Austria, run by Wiener Linien and dedicated to public transport. It is the largest tram museum dedicated to the public transit vehicles of a single city.

The purpose of the museum is to provide a complete documentation of all historical tram cars and buses that have been used in the city of Vienna over the last 150 years. The museum has one of the most extensive collections of historical vehicles in Europe.

== Location ==
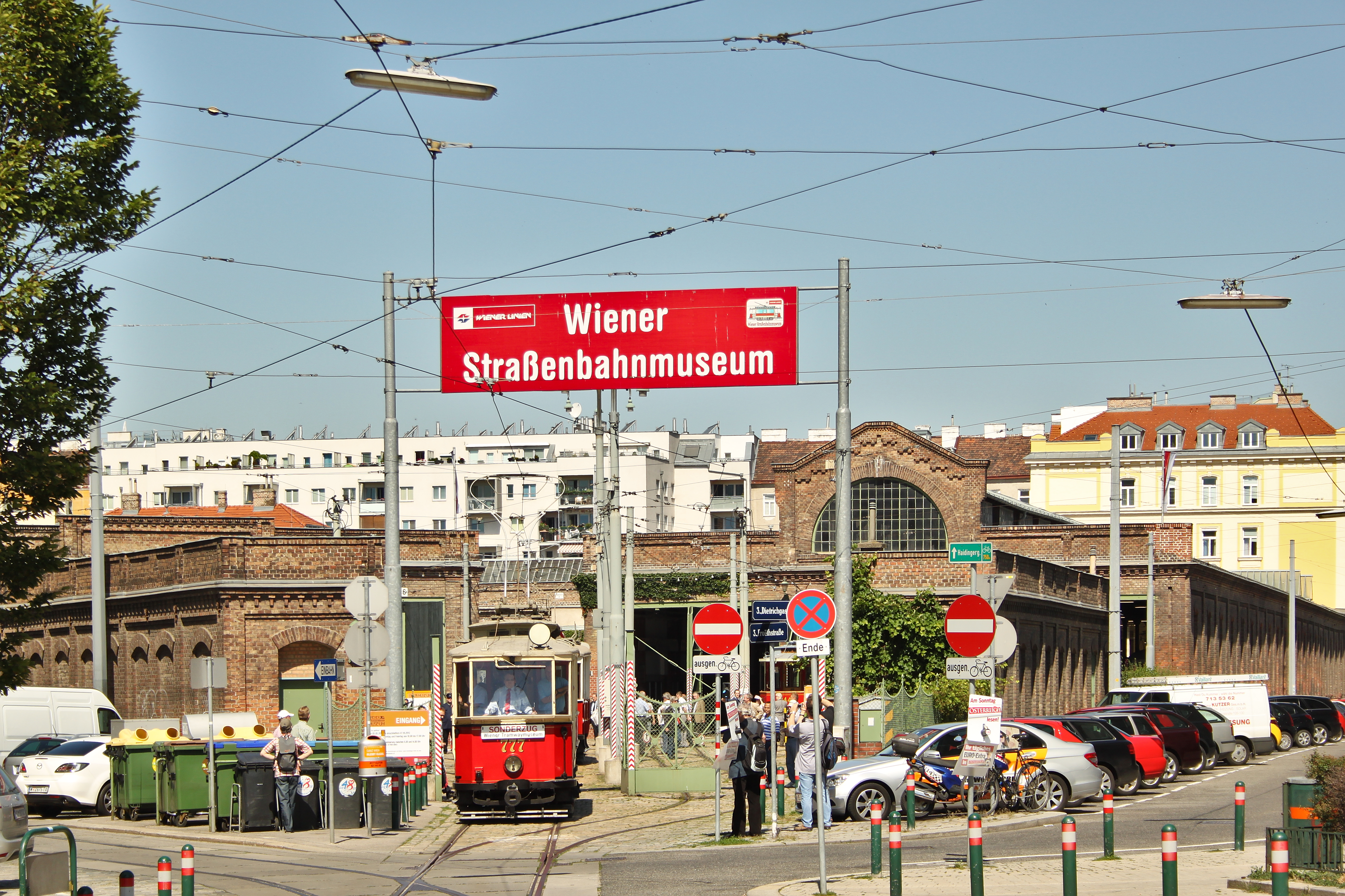
A historic tram leaving from the Vienna Transport Museum

The museum is located in Vienna's 3rd district Landstraße, in a former tramway depot in Ludwig-Koeßler Square. The depot was in use from 1901 to 1991. The name of the museum comes from the German Remise, a term for a shelter built to store vehicles or equipment (or in this case, trams).

Next to today's 18 tram, there used to also be a Line J. Over the Stadionbrücke stood a platform connecting to Lines 80 (Rotundenbrücke to Prater, Lusthaus) and 81 (Rotundenbrücke to Rennplatz Freudenau). During the height of tram traffic, dozens of vehicles could be "stacked" onto a large loop system to carry spectators to the horse races. Because of this, the depot for this station was made especially spacious.

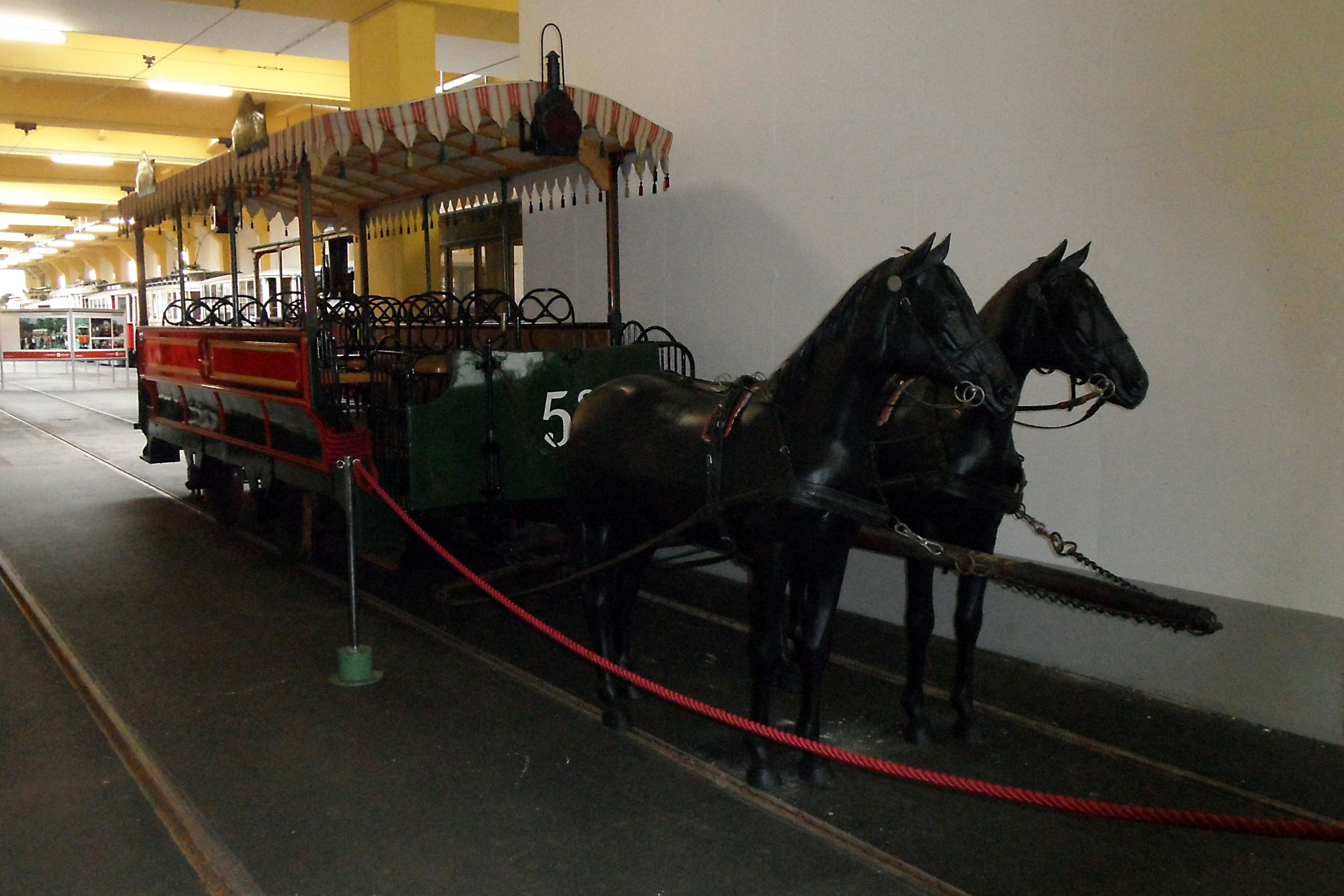
A horse-drawn tram

Until 2012, around 100 trams and city railway cars spanning the entire history of Viennese urban transit were exhibited within an area of 7,700 square meters and on 1,810 meters of platform. The oldest exhibition piece is a horse-drawn tram from 1868.

== Operation ==
The museum is operated and maintained by Wiener Linien, the city's transport company. Also involved is the Association of Railroad Friends (Verband der Eisenbahnfreunde (VEF)), and the Vienna Tramway Museum (Wiener Tramwaymuseum (WTM)), who assist by loaning vehicles to Remise and helping with restoration.

The museum offers private tours, educational tours, and event space rentals.

== History ==
The main concern of the Vienna Tramway Museum was to save and restore historically significant vehicles. It was founded in Vienna in 1966 by Helmut Portele (1940–2018). The museum began as a task force of the Association of Railroad Friends (VEF), but became its own independent organization in 1973. At that time in Vienna, urban highways were on the rise and trams were increasingly seen as obstacles to traffic.

In cooperation with the then Wiener Stadwerken - Verkehrsbetreibe, the enthusiasts set up the first iteration of a transport museum, in Hall IV of the Ottakring depot. In 1973, they began offering tours of Vienna in historic cars.

The collection of the Vienna Tramway Museum remained in Ottakring until February 16, 1986. The museum had to relocate, as the Hall was to be demolished.

In the mid-eighties, the public transport company (Wiener Verkehrsbetreibe (WVB)), recognizing the importance and popularity of the historical collection, took over the project of a tram museum. A part of the exhibition vehicles were transported to the Erdberg depot (still an active tram depot at the time). The two associations (the VEF and the WTM) who owned the vehicles, made their cars available to the museum as permanent loans. Now, since May 31, 1986, they can be viewed in the Vienna Transport Museum in Erdberg.

In January 1990, the Erdberg depot was no longer needed for tram operation, and the process to turn the depot into a real museum began in 1992.

A specialty of the museum was the exhibition of "guest vehicles," on loan from other museums. Historic trams from other tramways across Austria were also exhibited in the museum, including from St. Pölten, Baden, and Salzburg.

== Exhibitions ==
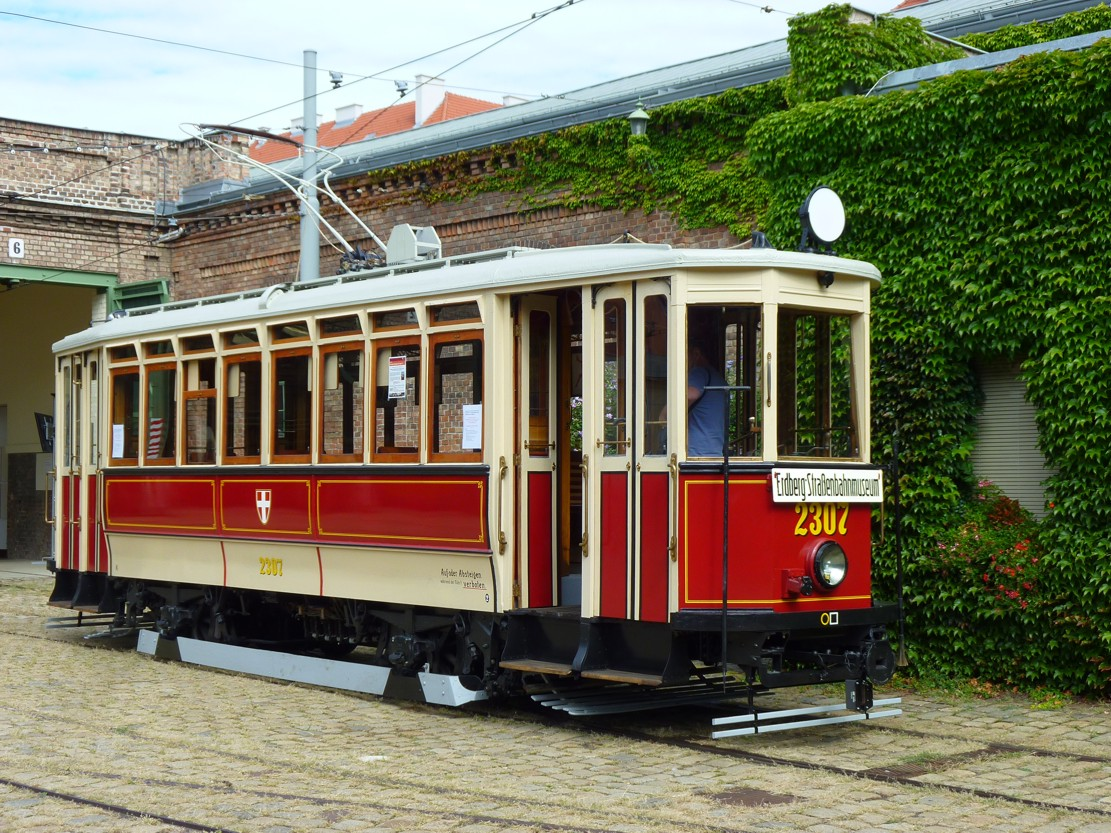
Tram type K on a special journey for the centenary celebration

Many of the museum's vehicles are kept in working order in its own workshop, so that they can be presented on special occasions. Numerous vehicles have been restored and reconstructed by volunteers over the last four decades.

Notable exhibits include a dark-green horse tram from 1868, a steam tramway set from 1885/1886, and an electric tram and railcars from 1901, four years after the first electric line in Vienna started operating.

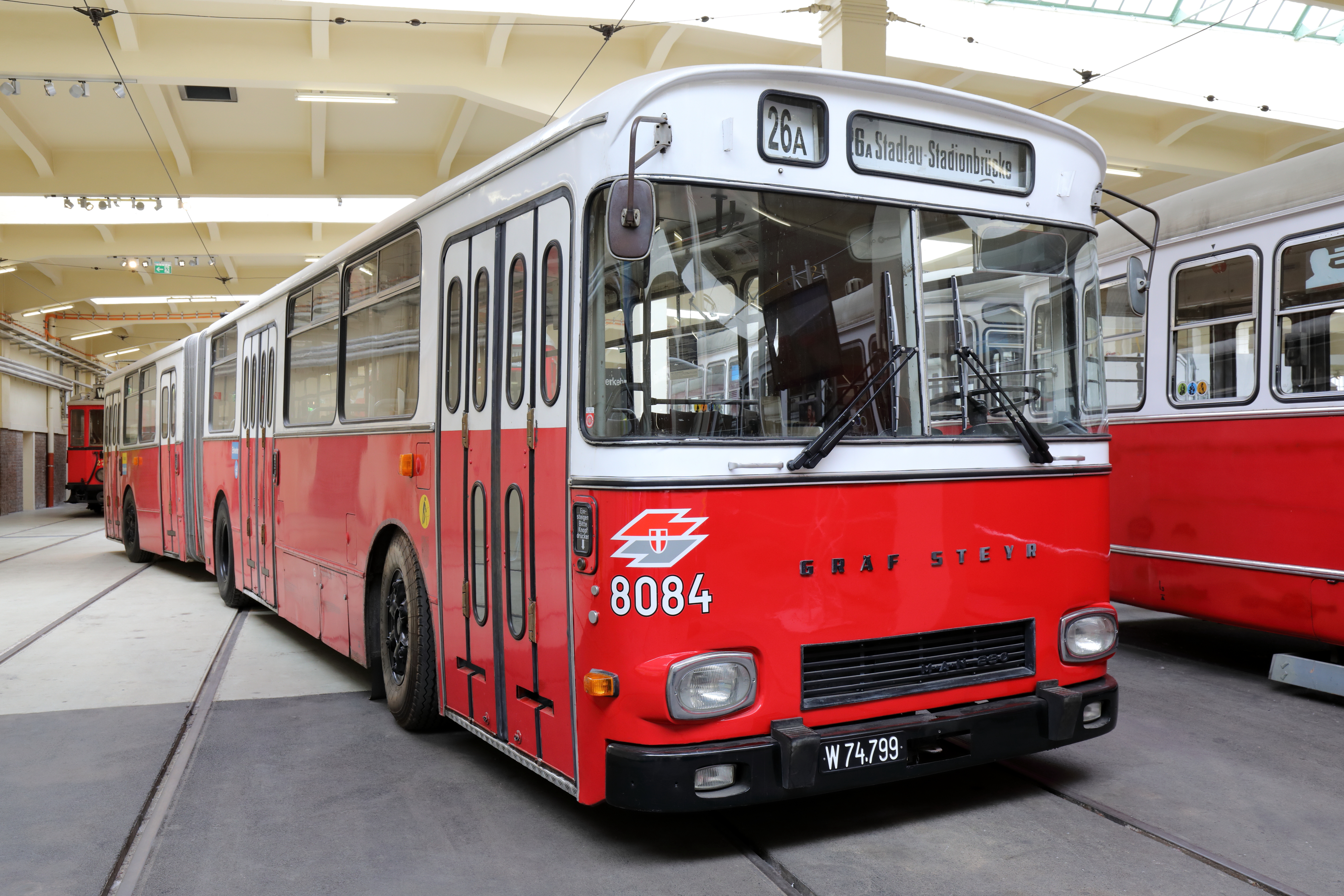
The bus that fell into the Danube when the Reichsbrücke collapsed

Also in the museum are public transit buses from 1949 to present, including the "Bus aus dem Fluss" (bus from the river), the bus that was swept into the Danube River when the Reichsbrücke collapsed in 1976. After the bus was recovered and repaired, it remained in regular service until 1989.

In 2013, the Vienna Tram Museum was closed for reconstruction. It reopened on September 13, 2014 as the Remise - Transport Museum of Wiener Linien. It now documents urban transport in its entirety, using interactive and multimedia components.

In Spring of 2014, in line with Christian Rapp's new museum concept, a "Silberpfeil" subway (U-Bahn) car was transferred to the museum.

Today, there are three main halls and 17 exhibitions. In addition to the vehicles, each station features small objects, historical photos, videos, and other interactive elements. For example, on the subject of Viennese public transport during World War I, there is information about the increase in woman tram drivers. Visitors can sit down for a simulation and see what it's like to drive the routes of five different subway lines.

== Trivia ==
The video for the song "Jai Ho! (You Are My Destiny)" by Indian composer A. R. Rahman and American girl group The Pussycat Dolls, which is taken from the soundtrack of the hit film Slumdog Millionaire (2008), was directed in 2009 by director Thomas Kloss in the museum.
