= Welcome to My Life (disambiguation) =

"Welcome to My Life" is a 2004 song by Simple Plan.

Welcome to My Life may also refer to:

- Welcome to My Life (Jonathan Fagerlund song), a 2009 song by Swedish singer Jonathan Fagerlund from his album Welcome to My World
- Welcome to My Life, a 2009 song by Sunrise Avenue
- "Welcome to My Life" (Empire of the Sun song), a 2016 song by the Australian electronic music duo Empire of the Sun
- Welcome to My Life (film), a 2017 documentary about Chris Brown
- Welcome to My Life, a 2015 pilot by Elizabeth Ito for Cartoon Network
