= Lee Hutton =

English singer

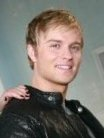
- Lee Hutton in 2009

Background information
- Born: Lee Andrew Hutton; 13 March 1987 (age 39)
- Origin: Chesterfield, England
- Genres: Pop
- Occupations: Singer, songwriter, musician
- Instruments: Vocals, guitar
- Years active: 2006–present
- Website: myspace.com/leehuttonofficial

Lee Andrew Hutton (born 13 March 1987, Chesterfield, England) is an English singer-songwriter.

== Early life ==
Lee Hutton was interested very early in music and learned to play guitar. In 2006, when he was just 18, he became part of the global/international boy band project Streetwize (alongside Irish Donal Skehan and Lee Mulhern (later known as Lee Matthews) and Swedish Jonathan Fagerlund). The original members made a tour in Ireland, UK, Sweden, and appeared on the US television station CN8, a cable television station where they performed "Room in Your Heart" in a morning show hosted by Greg Coy. After many changes, the amended cast of Streetwize – English Lee Hutton, Irish Lee Mulhern, Venezuelan Antonio Jones and American Kyle Carpenter – took part in Childline 2007 charity event singing a cover of Living in a Box's hit "Room in Your Heart".

Disenchanted with the progress of the band, Lee Hutton went on solo. Soon after Streetwize disbanded without any actual hits. Hutton's released a number of his tunes (like "Shinedown", "Perfect Bride", "Invincible", "Madeline", "Butterfly"...)

== Industry ==
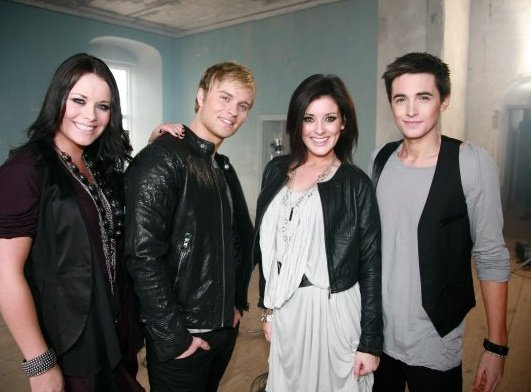
Hutton (second from left) with other Industry band members in 2009

In 2009, Lee Hutton joined the Irish band Industry becoming the only non-Irish member of the band, alongside the Irish band members Donal Skehan, Michele McGrath and Morgan Deane. The band had good success in the Irish charts including two chart topping singles "My Baby's Waiting" in June 2009 and "Burn" in August of the same year on the Irish Singles Chart. In 2009, they were also a supporting act for The Pussycat Dolls at Fitzgerald Stadium. Later Industry single releases like "In Your Arms" (with Hutton on lead vocals), "My Mistake", "Drown in the Music" and "Kill the DJ" did not chart, leading the decision to disband.

In 2009, Hutton also appeared in an Irish television series Xposee.

== After Industry ==
After the break-up of the group, Lee worked as a celebrity agent.

== 2011 Dansk Melodi Grand Prix ==
Lee Hutton took part in the 2011 Danish national final "Dansk Melodi Grand Prix" for the 2011 finals of the Eurovision Song Contest with the song "Hollywood Girl" written by Matilde Kühl, Sune Haansbæk, Ian Mack. He was selected to the final 10, with the live performance show on 26 February 2011, but did not make it to the Final 4 (semi-final stage). Contest was won by the band A Friend in London with their song "New Tomorrow".

== Discography ==
=== Singles ===
As part of Industry

- 2009: "My Baby's Waiting" (#1 on the Irish Singles Chart)
- August 2009: "Burn" (#1 on the Irish Singles Chart)
- November 2009: "In Your Arms"
- December 2009: "My Mistake"
- February 2010: "Drown in the Music"
- February 2010: "Kill the DJ"

Solo

- February 2011: "Hollywood Girl"
