= Lee Matthews (singer) =

Northern Irish singer-songwriter

- Birth name: Lee Mulhern
- Also known as: Lee.M
- Born: 12 June 1988 (age 37)
- Origin: Strabane, Northern Ireland
- Occupation: Singer
- Years active: 1995–present
- Website: www.leematthews.com

Lee Mulhern (born 12 June 1988), now known as Lee Matthews, is a singer-songwriter from Northern Ireland.

Starting age 8, Lee Mulhern (his birth name) had performed as a child star prodigy covering pop and country songs on many Irish and UK radio and television shows. At age 17, he embarked on a series of music projects like Streetwize, Streetside and Access All Areas, in a bid to be launched as an "international boy band" made up of singers from various nationalities. After the boy band projects fell through, he relaunched a solo music career adopting the name Lee.M, and for a short time formed NXT-GEN, an electropop duo collaboration with Pete Doherty.

In 2013, as Lee Matthews, he became part of the country music scene in Ireland in the Country and Irish genre releasing two albums, A Little Bitty Country in 2014 and It's a Great Day to Be Alive in 2015 and a string of singles releases.

== Beginnings as a child star ==
Lee Mulhern was born in Omagh, Northern Ireland. He now lives in the County Tyrone town of Strabane. He started his career at age 7, making his first appearance on Irish television winning the top prize in Children at Heart. He went on to sing live on the BBC for Children in Need appeal.

Aged 8, Lee released his first cassette album entitled Hey Good Looking a selection of pop, country and ballads. At age 9, he appeared on Hugo Duncan's BBC TV show Hugo and Friends as a child star. At 10, he won top spot in an 'Esat Digifone' talent competition. In 1999, at age 11, Lee was chosen to represent Ireland at the World Championships for Performing Arts in Los Angeles. He travelled with 35 other Irish contestants to compete against 1500 hopefuls from around the world. He won a gold, a silver and two bronze medals. His gold medal was for the song "I May Be Young", co-written by him and his mother Veronica, who was in Irish showbands in the 1980s. He won the silver as well during the same competition with his cover version of "The River" from Garth Brooks.

In 2001, at age 13, he participated in a Las Vegas New Year's Eve concert that included Barbra Streisand, Billy Joel and Neil Diamond. He made television appearances on TV3, BBC, ITV, RTÉ.

In 2002, he performed at the Buncrana Music Festival and also in many TV shows in Ireland and in the UK.

On 6 September 2002 in New York, Lee joined Ronan Tynon of the Irish Tenors and a host of other American artists at the Jacob K. Javits Convention Center for a concert to remember the victims of the 11 September attacks on New York. Lee also joined RTÉ's Gerry Ryan at Ground Zero on 9 September when he sang "Fields of Gold" at a special wreath-laying ceremony.

Songs from this early period performed by Mulhern include most notably "I May Be Young", "The River", "Fields of Gold" and "Bright Eyes". At various times, he appeared on various stages with well-established artists like Daniel O'Donnell, Hugo Duncan, Brian Coll, Philomena Begley, and Michael English.

In 2004, he was the lead actor in the short film "Buy Rights" about shoppers rights in the UK. He also completed a one-year acting course in performing arts in Northern Ireland's NW Institute of Performing Arts.

Lee Mulhern studied at St Colman's Secondary School in Strabane with music studies at North West Regional College in Derry.

== Lee Mulhern in bands and formations ==
Streetwize

In 2005, Lee Mulhern joined the band Streetwize, billed as the world's first "global boyband", as one of its original members, alongside Irish Donal Skehan, English Lee Hutton and Swedish Jonathan Fagerlund following successful auditions.

The original members made a tour in Ireland, UK, Sweden, and appeared on the US television station CN8, a cable television station where they performed "Room in Your Heart" during morning show hosted by Greg Coy. Streetwize (with the amended set-up of Lee Mulhern, Lee Hutton, Kyle Carpenter, Antonio Jones and Allan Cutler sang its signature song, a cover of Living in a Box's hit "Room in Your Heart" during the annual drive of the "ChildLine" charity in 2007 in Ireland. Soon Streetwize disbanded without any actual hits.

Streetwize band members were successful individually. Besides Mulhern's solo musical career, two other original members of Streetwize project, Donal Skehan and Lee Hutton went on to form a 4-member boy/girl Irish band named Industry (2009–2010) with two number one singles in Irish Pop Charts. Another Streetwize member, Jonathan Fagerlund became a successful solo singer in Sweden with two albums, the single "Playing Me" and a participation in Melodifestivalen 2009 with "Welcome to My Life".

Stateside

After many member changes, Streetwize was reformed and renamed Stateside. The main vocalists were Lee Mulhern and Venezuelan Antonio Jones, a young singer in a popular Latin American musical formation Fuera de Clase. Lee Mulhern left the band in August 2008 preferring a solo career. Other members included Chris Johnson and Ben Hazlewood

Access All Areas

In 2009, Lee Mulhern became part of a 4-member boy band project called Access All Areas alongside former Stateside member, the Venezuelan Antonio Jones in addition to 2 new recruits, Mali-Michael McCalla, the UK X Factor Final 24 contestant from series 5 and another UK recruit Tom Pepper. McCalla was later replaced by the Irish/Welsh/Australian Brandon Kemeny. The band broke up in 2011.

== In NXT-GEN duo ==
NXT-GEN
- Origin: Ireland
- Genres: Electropop, danse music
- Years active: 2012–2012
- Members: Lee.M; Pete Doherty

In 2012, Lee Mulhern now adopting the stage name Lee.M joined forces with Pete Doherty previously the frontman of The Libertines and also a part of the indie musical project Babyshambles. The two formed the Irish electropop danse duo NXT-GEN (Next Generation), releasing an electrodance demo titled "Magnetic".

Other materials co-written as a result of Mulhern / Doherty collaboration included "Invincible", "Rescue", "Hypnotized", "FTMN (Feel the Music Now)", "Painkillers", "We Can Rescue This", "Same as Me" and "Better Man". Lee.M also engaged in a 2012 tour to promote his music.

== Solo career as Lee.M and collaborations ==
Lee.M collaborated with New York singer J Pearl as well as Iyaz and Snoop Dogg in his official debut single release in "Slow Motion" credited to Lee M & J Pearl featuring Iyaz and Snoop Dogg. The opportunity for collaboration arose when Lee was spotted performing at a Kool and the Gang 60th birthday party in Orlando and was asked months later if he would be interested to do a track involving Snoop Dogg and Iyaz. The track was produced by Swiss producer David May and was on an international release with Strictly Rhythm label who has signed J. Pearl to its label. The music video was shot in Milan, Italy and Snoop Dogg parts in Los Angeles and is directed by renowned Italian music video director Claudio Zagarini.

In early 2013, Lee was approached by several of the mentors of "Eurosong 2013" to be in the Irish competition for choosing the Irish entry to the Eurovision Song Contest 2013 and he suggested "Magnetic". But due to his commitments with the launch of "Slow Motion" with his record label, Lee had to decline for this year.

== Solo career as Lee Matthews ==
During visits to the United States in 2012–2013, Lee's love of country music was reignited, after he saw the upsurge of a new generation of young country singers as crossover pop stars with a country flavour. Changing his name to Lee Matthews, he started giving gigs with a country flavour. He explains his decision in an interview with the Strabane Chronicle:

In America I got a buzz from seeing the country scene explode with a new generation of young country artists making country cooler. When I got back to Ireland I was so excited to see that Derek Ryan and Nathan Carter were also making country cool again here [in Ireland]. It's such a buzz to be back on stage again singing great songs that people love and enjoy dancing to. The people in Ireland appreciate good country music and they go out of their way to make you feel welcome. The first couple of gigs I did this year people were coming up and thanking me and just talking country music, it's great.

Later on in 2013, he released "Sadie's Got Her New Dress On", a bluegrass classic by Doyle Lawson and Quicksilver. Lee also released a music video that features Chloe Coyle. Lee followed that up with "That Country Girl". On 8 February 2014, Matthews launched a tour with a live band to promote his new country music career. In May 2014, he released a charity single in support of the Join Our Boys Trust in Ireland, a charity for those suffering from Duchenne muscular dystrophy. The song "Love Shine a Light, is a cover of a Katrina and the Waves song, the UK entry and eventual winner of Eurovision Song Contest 1997. It appears also on his 2014 album A Little Bitty Country.

Matthews has gone on to have five Irish Country download number one hits in just one year 2014–2015 including the self penned tracks "That Country Girl" from his album A Little Bitty Country and "There's Irish in Our Eyes" from the follow-up album It's a Great Day to Be Alive. The latter also included a new version of "Cotton Eye Joe", a Rednex global hit two decades earlier, based on a 200-year-old traditional instrumental song. His original hit single "The Irish Way" won "Best Original Single" at the Irish Hot Country Awards.

== Discography ==
=== Albums ===
As Lee Mulhern

- 1996: Hey Good Looking

As Lee Matthews

Title and details	Notes
A Little Bitty Country: Type: Studio album; Released: 10 October 2014; Label: Lee Matthews Music	Tracklist: 1. "Sadie's Got Her New Dress On" (3:05); 2. "Mirror on the Wall" (3:11); 3. "Brokenheartsville" (3:54); 4. "Not a Day Goes By" (4:05); 5. "Little Bitty" (2:23); 6. "Drink, Swear, Steal and Lie" (3:02); 7. "Don't Shut Me Out" (5:34); 8. "Mud on the Tires" (3:12); 9. "That Country Girl" (3:09); 10. "The Voyage" (3:20); 11. "There's Irish in Our Eyes" (3:05); 12. "Love Shine a Light (2:45)
It's a Great Day to Be Alive: Type: Studio album; Released: 20 November 2015; Label: Sharpe Music	Tracklist: 1. "Cotton Eye Joe" (3:07); 2. "Your Sweet Loving" (2:46); 3. "It's a Great Day to Be Alive" (3:21); 4. "Bang On the Ear" (4:10); 5. "The Irish Way" (3:16); 6. "Buy Me a Boat" (2:54); 7. "Here I Go Again" (3:16); 8. "Norma Jean Riley" (2:43); 9. "Then" (4:14); 10. "Got My Mind Set on You" (3:01); 11. "Girl Next Door" (3:28); 12. "If Tomorrow Never Comes" (3:54)

=== Singles ===
as NXT-GEN

- 2012: "Magnetic"
- 2012: "Painkillers"

as Lee.M

- 2012: "Slow Motion" (Lee M & J. Pearl featuring Iyaz & Snoop Dogg)

as Lee Matthews

Year	Single	Peak positions	Album
Year	Single	IRE Irish Singles Chart	Album
2013	"Sadie's Got Her New Dress On"	–	A Little Bitty Country
2014	"That Country Girl"	–	A Little Bitty Country
2014	"Love Shine a Light"	68	A Little Bitty Country
2014	"There's Irish in Our Eyes"	–	A Little Bitty Country
2014	"The Voyage"	–	A Little Bitty Country
2015	"The Irish Way"	–	It's a Great Day to Be Alive
2018	"Marie"	–	

Others

- 2015: "Cotton Eye Joe"
- 2015: "It's a Great Day to Be Alive"
- 2015: "Buy Me a Boat"
- 2015: "Girl Next Door"
- 2015: "Bang on the Ear"
- 2016: "The Farmer Wants a Wife"
- 2016: "Do Dat Diddly Ding Dang"
- 2017: "Castle on the Hill"
- 2018: "A Mother's Call"
- 2018: "Seven Nights in Eire"
- 2019: "Marie"
- 2020: "Girl Next Door"
- 2020: "Mirror on the Wall"
- 2021: "I Think She Likes Me"
- 2021: "On the Fields"
- 2022: "Irish Whiskey on the Shelf"
