= Industry (Irish band) =

Irish band

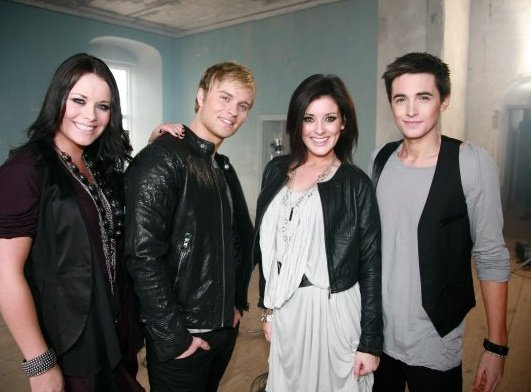
- Industry from left to right, Michele McGrath, Lee Hutton, Morgan Deane and Donal Skehan.

Background information
- Origin: Ireland
- Genres: Pop
- Years active: 2009–2010
- Labels: MIG Live
- Members: Donal Skehan; Morgan Deane; Michele McGrath; Lee Hutton

Industry were a pop group formed in Ireland in 2009. The band comprised Donal Skehan, Morgan Deane, Michele McGrath and Briton Lee Hutton. Industry made their recording debut in 2009 under the independent record label MIG Live, and broke up in 2010.

The band had two number 1 hits in the Irish Singles Chart with their debut single "My Baby's Waiting" (25 June 2009 chart) and follow up "Burn" (27 August 2009 chart)

== Members ==
=== Lee Hutton ===
Lee Andrew Hutton is an English singer-songwriter musician, born in Chesterfield. He was part of the boy band project Streetwize, alongside Donal Skehan, Lee Mulhern and Jonathan Fagerlund. With a slightly changed Streetwize line-up that included Kyle Carpenter and Venezuelan Antonio Jones, Hutton took part in Childline 2007 charity event singing a cover of Living in a Box's hit "Room in Your Heart". Hutton then went solo with "Shinedown", "Perfect Bride", "Invincible", "Madeline" and "Butterfly" until joining Industry, becoming the only non-Irish member of the band.

=== Donal Skehan ===
Donal Skehan, a vocalist with Industry, was born in Dublin, Ireland, on 3 June 1986. In 2006, he was an original member of the boyband project Streetwize, with whom he toured in Ireland, UK and Sweden, and appeared on the US television station CN8.

After quitting the band, he became an announcer on the Bubble Hits station, broadcasting music and entertainment news and celebrity gossip segments. On 23 February 2008, he attempted to represent Ireland in the 2008 Eurovision Song Contest with the song "Double Cross My Heart" composed by Joel Humlen, Oscar Gorres and Charlie Mason, but was beaten by Dustin the Turkey. Skehan has also authored a cookbook, Good Mood Food.

=== Michele McGrath ===
Michele McGrath, born in Dublin 12 April 1987, is a model, singer, actress and presenter and has been represented by Andrea Roche Agency. She has been a fashion contributor on TV3's Ireland AM. Acting credits include Camelot and The Tudors.

=== Morgan Deane ===
Morgan Deane was born in 1985 in Cork City, Ireland. Morgan worked as a co-presenter on RTEs ‘The Den’. Morgan is also the celebrated blogger behind The Green Girls Guide to Divorce. She has 2 children, Cadence and Carter with ex-husband Graeme Smith. A lover of the outdoors and still an ambassador for music and female musicians her motto is "better to lead in your boots rather than fail in your slippers"

== History ==
Industry were signed to MIG Live, an independent label, formed by former Bubble Hits owner James Hyland who also managed the group. The group supported the Pussycat Dolls on their Irish tour during the release of their first single, "My Baby's Waiting". The single was released in June 2009 and peaked at number 1 on the Irish Singles Chart for one week.

Their second single, "Burn", was released in August 2009 and also took the number 1 spot.

The band's third single, "In Your Arms", was set for a November 2009 European release, written by band member Lee Hutton.

== Discography ==
=== Singles ===
==== Charting ====
Peak position in Ireland
| Year | Single | Peak |
|---|---|---|
| 2009 | "My Baby's Waiting" | 1 |
| 2009 | "Burn" | 1 |

==== Non-charting singles ====
- 2009: "In Your Arms"
- 2010: "My Mistake"

== Collaborations ==
In 2009, they were a supporting act for the Pussycat Dolls at Fitzgerald Stadium, Killarney.
