= Donal Skehan =

Irish singer, TV personality, cook, cookbook writer (born 1986)

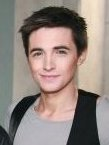
- Skehan in 2009
- Born: 3 June 1986 (age 40); Howth, Dublin, Ireland
- Occupations: Television personality; presenter; food writer; YouTuber; singer
- Years active: 2006–present
- Spouse: Sofie Larsson (m. 2015)
- Children: 2
- Musical career
- Genre: Pop
- Instrument: Vocals
- Years active: 2006–2010
- Label: MIG Live
- Website: Official Website

Donal Skehan (born 3 June 1986) is an Irish television personality, presenter (specialising in food programmes), food writer, cook, photographer and former singer. He is known for his television appearances, cookbooks and YouTube channel.

Skehan was also a member of the boy band Streetwize. As vocalist with Industry he had two No. 1 singles with them on the Irish Singles Chart in 2009.

== Early life ==
His parents, Dermot and Liz, are in the food industry; running their own food distribution company. Having grown up in Howth, Skehan attended Sutton Park School and went on to study media at Dublin Business School.

== Television and cooking career ==
=== Television personality ===
Skehan worked as an announcer on the Irish entertainment specialty channel Bubble Hits, broadcasting music and entertainment news and celebrity gossip segments.

=== Food author and presenter ===
An avid food enthusiast, Skehan started a blog in 2007 called Good Mood Food that evolved into a cookbook. After many appearances on television, and giving of live demonstrations at social events and shows, he was featured in his own weekly food programme, Kitchen Hero, on RTÉ One that was launched on 16 May 2011. In 2011, he published a cookbook based on the television series, Home Kitchen Hero – Bringing Cooking Back Home. A second series and a Christmas special were aired in 2012. UKTV network Good Food began airing the show in April 2012.

Skehan became a co-presenter and judge on Junior MasterChef on the BBC in 2012, appearing alongside John Torode. In 2013, after appearing on Jamie Oliver's YouTube channel, Foodtube, Skehan launched his own dedicated YouTube channel which has since grown to over 1M subscribers.

Skehan presented a new series for Food Network UK, Follow Donal, which saw him explore Vietnam in a four-part series and then went on to visit ten European cities in the second installment of the series which aired in the autumn of 2015. Skehan is also appearing in the Swedish food programme Mitt kök on TV4 where he speaks Swedish. Skehan is currently one of a number of rotating guest presenters for Saturday Kitchen on BBC One and has hosted six editions of the show to date. In 2021, his book Everyday Cook won Cookbook of the Year at the Irish Book Awards.

== Music career ==
=== 2006: Streetwize ===
Skehan was interested very early in music. In 2006, he became part of the global/international boy band project Streetwize (alongside Irish Lee Mulhern (later known as Lee Matthews), English Lee Hutton and Swedish Jonathan Fagerlund). The original members made a tour in Ireland, UK, Sweden, and appeared on the US television station CN8, a cable television station where they performed "Room in Your Heart" in a morning show hosted by Greg Coy. Skehan and Jonathan Fagerlund were disenchanted with the progress of the band and left early to be replaced by Venezuelan Antonio Jones and American Kyle Carpenter. Streetwize eventually folded without any hits.

=== 2008: Irish Eurosong preliminaries for Eurovision Song Contest ===
On 23 February 2008, Skehan took part in Eurosong 2008 in a bid to represent Ireland in the 2008 Eurovision Song Contest with the song "Double Cross My Heart". It was a pop song composed by Joel Humlen, Oscar Gorres and Charlie Mason, and performed by Skehan with two male and two female back-up dancers, as well as a male back-up singer. Skehan was one of the Final 6, alongside Dustin the Turkey, Maja, Leona Daly, Liam Geddes and Marc Roberts; with Dustin the Turkey winning with the song "Irelande Douze Pointe".

=== 2009–2010: Industry ===
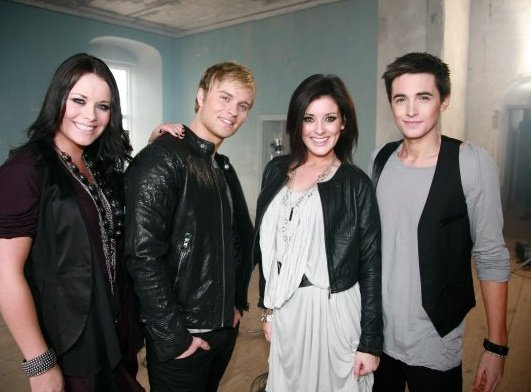
Skehan (right) with other Industry band members in 2009

In 2009, Skehan joined the Irish band Industry alongside the English Lee Hutton (his former bandmate in Streetwize) and Irish girl members Michele McGrath and Morgan Deane. Industry had success in the Irish charts including two chart-topping singles "My Baby's Waiting" in June 2009 and "Burn" in August of the same year on the Irish Singles Chart. In 2009, they were also a supporting act for The Pussycat Dolls at Fitzgerald Stadium. Later Industry single releases like "In Your Arms", "My Mistake", "Drown in the Music" and "Kill the DJ" did not chart. The band broke up in 2010.

== Personal life ==
In June 2015, Skehan married Sofie Larsson in Dublin City Hall followed by a reception in Lisnavagh House in County Carlow and had their honeymoon in Ravello on Italy's Amalfi Coast. From 2016 to 2020, Skehan and his wife had a stint in Los Angeles before moving back to Dublin, where they bought a house in 2023.

In June 2017, the couple announced that they were expecting their first child. In December 2017, their son was born in Los Angeles. In June 2019, the couple announced they were expecting a second child, a son, who was born on 28 November 2019. Their sons have since been raised and educated in Dublin.

== Filmography ==
=== Television ===
Year	Title	Role	Notes
2010–2013	Kitchen Hero	Presenter	42 episodes
2012–2014	Junior MasterChef	Judge	
2013	Grandma's Boy	Presenter	13 episodes
2014–2015	Mitt kök	Presenter	
2014	Donal's Irish Feast	Presenter	8 episodes
2015–2016	Follow Donal...	Presenter	19 episodes
2015	Cook, Eat, Burn!	Presenter	7 episodes
2016	Saturday Kitchen	Guest presenter	12 episodes
2016	Food Network Star Kids	Judge	6 episodes
2016	Food Network Star	Guest judge	Season 12, Episode 9: "Food Holiday Fray"
2017	Cutthroat Kitchen	Guest judge	Season 15, Episode 4: "Do You Really Wonton Hurt Me?"
2018	Donals Asian Baking Adventure	Presenter	10 episodes
2018	The Best Thing I Ever Ate	Guest presenter	Season 8, Episode 8: "Throwback"; Season 8, Episode 14: "Serious Spice"
2018	Food: Fact or Fiction?	Guest presenter	Season 4, Episode 1: "Brunch Beauties"; Season 4, Episode 3: "Game Night"; Season 4, Episode 4: "Wicked Good"
2021	Baketopia	Judge	

=== Web ===
Year	Title	Role	Notes
2013–2015	Jamie Oliver's FoodTube	Presenter	20 episodes
2014	Donal's Simple Suppers	Presenter	15 episodes
2016–2018	Ro's Life	Guest host	"Cheesecake Challenge" "Trying the Doggie Doo Game" "We try the Crazy Toaster Game"
2017–2019	Nerdy Nummies	Guest host	"Fantastic Beasts Queenie's Apple Strudel" "Baby Shark Cakes!"
2017–2019	5 Ingredient...	Presenter	29 episodes
2018	Donal Eats LA	Presenter	5 episodes
2018	Donal's Thailand Adventure	Presenter	3 episodes
2019	Weeknight Pasta	Presenter	4 episodes
2019	Click Plate	Presenter	1 episode
2019	Sweet Tooth	Presenter	4 episodes

== Discography ==
=== Singles ===
Solo

- "Double Cross My Heart" (2008)

As part of Industry

- "My Baby's Waiting" (2010) (No. 1 on the Irish Singles Chart)
- "Burn" (2009) (No. 1 on the Irish Singles Chart)
- "In Your Arms" (2009)
- "My Mistake" (2009)
- "Drown in the Music" (2010)
- "Kill the DJ" (2010)

== Bibliography ==
- 2009: Good Mood Food: Simple, Healthy Homecooking!
- 2011: Kitchen Hero: Bringing Cooking Back Home
- 2012: Kitchen Hero: Great Food For Less
- 2013: Home Cooked
- 2013: Feast: A Dinner Journal (Edited by Ross Golden Bannon)
- 2013: Easy Recipes for Summer Cooking (co-authored with Sheila Kiely and Rosanne Hewitt-Cromwell)
- 2014: The Pleasures of the Table: Rediscovering Theodora FitzGibbon
- 2015: Fresh
- 2016: Eat. Live. Go – Fresh Food Fast
- 2018: Donal's Meal in Minutes: 90 Suppers from Scratch, 15 Minutes Prep
- 2019: Super Food in Minutes: Easy Recipes, Fast Food, All Healthy
- 2021: Everyday Cook
- 2023: Home Cook
- 2025: Real Time Recipes
