= Obsession (Shayne Ward album) =

Studio album by Shayne Ward
- Released: 15 November 2010
- Length: 35:14
- Label: Syco; Sony
- Producer: Ray Hedges; Nigel Butler; Cutfather; CD; David Kopatz; Rami Yacoub; Lucas Secon; Arnthor Birgisson; Quiz & Larossi; Tony Nilsson; Darin Zanyar; Jim & Jack

Shayne Ward chronology
Breathless (2007)	Obsession (2010)	Closer (2015)

Singles from Obsession
- 1. "Gotta Be Somebody" Released: 7 November 2010; 2. "Obsession" Released: 14 February 2011; 3. "Must Be a Reason Why..." Released: 3 October 2011

Obsession is the third studio album by English singer Shayne Ward. It was released by Syco Music and Sony Music Entertainment on 15 November 2010 in the United Kingdom, and on 8 February 2011 in the United States. While he reteamed with Cutfather, Arnthor Birgisson, Savan Kotecha and Rami Yacoub to record for the album, Ward consulted a wider range of producers to work with him on new material, including Ray Hedges, Lucas Secon, Wayne Hector, Tony Nilsson, and Quiz & Larossi.

The album received average reviews from music critics, who noticed Ward's vocalist qualities, but felt it misses good songs and blamed Simon Cowell and Syco Music for it. Obsession debuted at number 15 on the UK Albums Chart and number 11 on the Irish Albums Chart, reaching Silver status in the United Kingdom. While lead single "Gotta Be Somebody," a cover of Canadian rock band Nickelback's 2008 song, became a top ten hit, Obsession marked Ward's final single with Syco.

== Background ==
It was announced in January 2010 that Ward had begun writing his third studio album, with help from American producers RedOne and Taio Cruz. Ward actually worked on the album for about two and a half years, working in several locations in the United States with around 50 producers, as he wanted the album to be different from his first two. Several songs were recorded, including "Oxygen", which was due to be the lead single, "Elevator", a demo of which appears on Ward's official YouTube account, and "Tonight", a duet with Sugababes singer Heidi Range. "Oxygen" was co-written with Danish songwriters Remee and Thomas Troelsen, and was later recorded by Danish pop group Alien Beat Club for their debut album, Diversity (2009). Work continued on the album during the year, with Ward recording further material penned by Savan Kotecha, Quiz & Larossi and Lucas Secon.

Work on the album was completed in September 2010, when Ward announced that none of the songs produced by RedOne and Taio Cruz would be included. He later said of the decision: "I needed the right songs to come in. I've recorded about seven albums' worth of tracks, some of which were with Taio Cruz, RedOne and Darkchild which didn't even make the album. They're still in the pipeline." The album's lead single, "Gotta Be Somebody", is a cover of a Nickelback song, first released by them in 2008. The album was originally scheduled to be released in 2009 but the release date was pushed back by the record label. A track called "King of My Castle" featuring American singer Britney Spears was meant to be on the album but was scrapped for unknown reasons. The track leaked on the internet on 25 June 2021.

== Singles ==
The album was preceded by the lead single "Gotta Be Somebody", a cover version of Nickelback's 2008 song, on 7 November 2010. The album's second single, Obsession, was only released promotionally, being released on the week of 14 February 2011. Ward performed the song on The Alan Titchmarsh Show and The Graham Norton Show on the week of release. "Gotta Be Somebody was also released to radio, and a promotional CD single was issued. The album's third and final single was a remixed version of "Must Be a Reason Why", which was released on 3 October 2011.

== Critical reception ==
Professional ratings
Review scores
Source	Rating
4Music	3/5 stars
AllMusic	3/5 stars
Funky.co.uk	3.5/5 stars
Newsround	3/5 stars
OK! Magazine	3/5 stars

Upon its release, the album received generally mixed reviews from music critics. Jon O'Brien from AllMusic gave the album a rating of three out of five stars, saying: "After a three-year absence, Ward really needed to step up his game to re-establish his pop star credentials. But despite being labelled the UK Justin Timberlake early in his career, Obsession's dated sound and consistent mediocrity are more likely to see him dubbed as the U. Peter Andre." Similarly, David Griffiths from 4Music stated: "Sadly Shayne's early promise as the British Timberlake has yet to be fully realised and he's a far better vocalist than much of the material gives him credit for. We're particularly curious to hear what happened to the rumoured collaborations with RedOne, Darkchild and Taio Cruz, as they could well have bolstered some of the weaker songs on offer here. Still, it's great to have him back after all this time."

The OK! Magazine observed that Obsession was "more polished than Simon Cowell's veneers. The title track – inspired by Prince's legendary "Purple Rain" – is a swooping belter, while "Close to Close" is a hook-laden ballad that wouldn't sound out of place on JLS's latest offering." Entertainment-Focus was more negative, saying "Obsession is a record that serves to frustrate rather than impress. We can only lay the blame for this patchy effort on the record label. After a three-year wait Obsession doesn't deliver on the anticipation it has built. For the record we absolutely love Shayne but he needs, and deserves, stronger material than this." The Guardian described the single "Must Be a Reason Why" as "music for evil stumpy Russian men to dance to while wearing budgie smugglers and pretending they're being fellated."

== Commercial performance ==
Obsession debuted at number 15 on the UK Albums Chart and number 11 on the Irish Albums Chart. In the UK, its first week sales were 22,452. Due to lackluster sales, Ward was dropped by Syco Records in April 2011. Two years later, on 22 July 2013, the album was certified Silver by the British Phonographic Industry (BPI).

== Track listing ==
Obsession track listing
No.	Title	Writer(s)	Producer(s)	Length
1.	"Gotta Be Somebody"	Chad Kroeger; Ryan Peake; Michael Kroeger; Daniel Adair	Ray Hedges; Nigel Butler; Cutfather; David Kopatz	3:41
2.	"Obsession"	Rami Yacoub; Savan Kotecha; Shayne Ward	Yacoub	3:34
3.	"Must Be a Reason Why..." (featuring J. Pearl)	Chris Brann; Lucas Secon; Mintman	Secon	3:20
4.	"Close to Close"	Karl Sandberg; Arnthor Birgisson; Savan Kotecha	Birgisson	3:33
5.	"Waiting in the Wings"	Andreas Romdhane; Josef Larossi; Andrew Frampton; Ward	Quiz & Larossi	4:03
6.	"Foolish"	Darin Zanyar; Tony Nilsson	Nilsson; Zanyar	3:18
7.	"Someone Like You"	Mark White; Secon; Wayne Hector; Andrea Martin	Secon	3:01
8.	"Human"	Virginia McGrail; Jonas Myrin; Lars Aass; Ole Antonsen	Jim & Jack	4:11
9.	"Crash"	Romdhane; Larossi; Claude Kelly	Quiz & Larossi	3:52
10.	"Nobody Knows"	Joseph Rich; Donald DuBose	CD	4:47
Total length:				35:14

Sample credits

- "Must Be a Reason Why..." samples "King of My Castle" as performed by Wamdue Project and written by Chris Brann. Initially a collaboration with Britney Spears was thought, she came to record the demo of the song
- "Someone Like You" samples "Two Princes" as performed by Spin Doctors and written by Mark White, Spin Doctors, Eric Schenkman, Chris Barron and Aaron Comess.
- "Nobody Knows" is a cover version of the song of the same title as performed by The Tony Rich Project and written by Joe Rich and Don DuBose.

== Charts ==
Weekly chart performance for Obsession
Chart (2010)	Peak position
European Top 100 Albums (Billboard)	39
Irish Albums (IRMA)	11
UK Albums (OCC)	15

== Certifications ==
Certifications for Obsession
Region	Certification	Certified units/sales
United Kingdom (BPI)	Silver	60,000^{^}
^{^} Shipments figures based on certification alone.

== Release history ==
Breathless release history
Region	Date	Ref(s)
United Kingdom	15 November 2010	
United States	2 February 2008	
