= Must Be a Reason Why =

"Must Be A Reason Why"

Single by J. Pearl featuring Shayne Ward

from the album Obsession
- Released: October 3, 2011
- Recorded: 2011
- Genre: Dance-pop; electropop
- Length: 2:36 (Guy Kastav Radio Edit); 3:24 (Album Version)
- Label: Simply Delicious
- Songwriters: Chris Brann, Lucas Secon, Mintman
- Producer: Lucas Secon

J. Pearl singles chronology
"It's Getting Physical" (2010)	"Must Be A Reason Why" (2011)	"Slow Motion" (2012)

Shayne Ward singles chronology
"Obsession" (2011)	"Must Be A Reason Why" (2011)	"My Heart Would Take You Back" (2015)

"Must Be A Reason Why" is a song by American MC J. Pearl, released as a single in the United Kingdom on August 2, 2011 and in other European countries on October 3, 2011. The single features vocals from British singer Shayne Ward.

== Background ==
"Must Be A Reason Why" was produced by Lucas Secon, and was written by Secon, Chris Brann and Mintman. The song samples Wamdue Project's 1997 dance track, "King of My Castle". The track was originally recorded with American artist Britney Spears as the featured vocalist, and Ward as the main vocalist. Spears was subsequently replaced with J. Pearl and the track was to be included on Ward's third studio album, Obsession. The single was announced for release in January 2011, but prior to its release, Ward was dropped from his record label, Syco Records, preventing the release occurring. However, Pearl's record label, Simply Delicious, offered to release the single on Ward's behalf if he let Pearl be credited as the main vocalist. Ward agreed, and thus, the track was remixed by producer Guy Kastav, and prepared for release in August 2011. The single was later issued across Europe on October 3, 2011, with Italy being the only country to receive a physical release.

== Music video ==
The music video for "Must Be A Reason Why" was shot at Portland Place, London, and directed by director Andy Hylton. It premiered on June 15, 2011, via Simply Delicious' YouTube account, at a total length of two minutes and forty seconds. The video consists of Pearl and Ward searching for each other in a nightclub, and performing the song amongst the crowd. The video received its first television airplay on Starz on Friday, June 17, 2011.

== Track listing ==
- Digital download
1. "Must Be A Reason Why" (Guy Katsav Radio Edit) - 2:36
- Digital download - Extended Mix
1. "Must Be A Reason Why" (Guy Katsav Extended Mix) - 5:46
- Digital download - Afrojack Mixes
1. "Must Be A Reason Why" (Afrojack Radio Edit) - 3:26
2. "Must Be A Reason Why" (Afrojack Club Remix) - 7:27
3. "Must Be A Reason Why" (Afrojack Dub) - 6:28
- 'Digital download - Remixes EP
1. "Must Be A Reason Why" (Afrojack Club Remix) - 7:27
2. "Must Be A Reason Why" (Funky Stepz Dirty Dub) - 4:17
3. "Must Be A Reason Why" (Guy Katsav Extended Mix) - 5:46
4. "Must Be A Reason Why" (Costi Forza Mainstream Version) - 5:07
5. "Must Be A Reason Why" (Rivaz Club Remix) - 6:18

- Italian Maxi CD single
1. "Must Be A Reason Why" (Guy Katsav Radio Edit) - 2:36
2. "Must Be A Reason Why" (Afrojack Radio Edit) - 3:26
3. "Must Be A Reason Why" (Rivaz Radio Edit) - 3:11
4. "Must Be A Reason Why" (Costi Forza Mainstream Version) - 5:07
5. "Must Be A Reason Why" (Afrojack Club Remix) - 7:27
6. "Must Be A Reason Why" (Rivaz Club Remix) - 6:18
7. "Must Be A Reason Why" (Guy Katsav Extended Mix) - 5:46
8. "Must Be A Reason Why" (Costi Forza Extended Club Edit) - 7:05
9. "Must Be A Reason Why" (Afrojack Dub) - 6:28
10. "Must Be A Reason Why" (Funky Stepz Dirty Dub) - 4:17
11. "Must Be A Reason Why" (Music Video) - 2:40

== Charts ==
Chart (2011)	Peak position
Spain (Promusicae)	29

== Release history ==
Country	Date	Format	Label
United Kingdom	2 August 2011	Digital download	Simply Delicious
Italy	3 October 2011	CD single	Simply Delicious / X-Energy Records
