= Calle Ciega =

Venezuelan boy band

- Also known as: Calle Ciega
- Origin: Caracas, Venezuela
- Genres: Merengue; hip hop; Reggaeton
- Years active: 1997–2003, 2004-2008, 2008-2010, 2012–14
- Labels: Hecho a Mano, Latin World
- Members: none
- Past members: Damian Alvarez; David Díaz; Vladimir Mundo; Kingston Luna; Pablo Rivero; Eduardo Hernandez; Fernando Pineda; Christian Rigu; Chyno Miranda; Jhey Sosa; Nacho; Luifer; Gabo Márquez; Emilio Vizcaino; Kent James; Aldo Armas; Kevin Arvelo; Sandy Carrero; Anderson Castro; Marco Perez (Marko); Enderson Linarez (Linarez); Oswaldo Sánchez; Gabriel Sánchez; Alejandro Acosta; Andris Rivero; Omar Acedo; Sixto Rein (Singer)

Calle Ciega is a boy band from Venezuela. The group, created and managed by Artist developers and management team formed by Jhonny Nuñez, originally began singing merengue-based songs, but as the different incarnations of the group progressed the songs moved away from merengue toward the more urban sounds of hip hop and reggaeton.

The first version of Calle Ciega was a seven-piece outfit consisting of Damian Alvarez, David Díaz, Vladimir Mundo, Kingston Luna, Pablo Rivero, Eduardo "Black" Hernandez y Fernando Pineda. Their albums were all released and produced by singer Ricardo Montaner's own record label "Hecho a Mano" and by musical producer Fernando Rojo. The group were extremely successful in their home country, with their first two albums earning them gold and platinum discs, respectively. Alvarez and Pineda left after the first two albums and Christian Rigu was added to the group for their third album, Seguimos Bailando.

A new version of the group, now produced and managed by Rafael Quintana, Enrique Verhelst, and Ruben Ferrer Rubio, recorded Una Vez Más in 2005, with the line-up of Jesus "Chino" Miranda, Miguel Ignacio "Nacho" Mendoza, Luis Fernando "Luifer" Romero, Kent Jaimes and Emilio Vizcaino. The album was also released in the United States by Prisma Records. Miranda and Mendoza left in 2007 to form the successful duo Chino & Nacho before pursuing solo careers from 2017 onwards. The remaining three members continued for a while before splitting up, with Emilio Vizcaino, who had earlier been part of the Venezuelan musical project Fuera de Clase, and Luifer teaming up in Los Cadillacs.

The third version of Calle Ciega was formed in 2012, featuring Anderson Castro, Jhey Sosa, Aldo Armas, Kevin Arvelo and Sandy Carrero, and released a single "Mía".

The latest line-up of Calle Ciega was unveiled in 2017. The new group consists of Alonson "Alon" Urbina, Edwar "Hommy" Alvarado, Gabriel "Gabo" Mundo, Enderson Linarez (Linarez) and Hecson "Hache" Hernández. The quartet released two singles, "Mi Persona Favorita" and "Ya No Hay Dolor" and a seven-track album titled 2018.

== Discography ==
=== Studio albums ===
- 1998: Caliente
- 1999: No Pares de Sudar
- 2001: Seguimos Bailando
- 2004: La Carcajada
- 2005: Una Vez Más
- 2006: Edición Especial
- 2007: Más Caliente
- 2008: Los Nenes De La Casa
- 2017: 2018

=== Compilations ===
- 2000: Exitos

=== Collaborations ===
- 2000: Asi Son Bonco (Con Guaco)
- 2004: Dejame Entrar A Tu Corazon (Con Tecupae)
- 2005: Pase Lo Que Pase (Con Mr Brian)
- 2005: Consuelito (Con Calibu y Eddie Castro)

=== MixTapes ===
- 2007: Desde Calle Ciega (Con Chino y Nacho, Los Cadillacs, Franco y Oscarcito)

=== Singles ===
- 2004: La Carcajada
- 2004: La Avispa
- 2004: Una Vez Más
- 2005: Mi Cachorrita
- 2005: Pase Lo Que Pase
- 2005: Como Te Extraña Mi Cama
- 2005: El Vestido Rojo
- 2006: Tu y Yo
- 2006: La Pastillita
- 2007: La Prueba Final
- 2007: Dile
- 2007: Aunque Mal Paguen
- 2008: Vete
- 2008: Dile (Electro Dance Mix)
- 2012: Apaga la Luz
- 2012: Amándote Más
- 2012: Mía
- 2017: Mi Persona Favorita
- 2017: Ya No Hay Dolor
