= Welcome to My World (Jonathan Fagerlund album) =

Studio album by Jonathan Fagerlund
- Released: 20 May 2009
- Recorded: 2008–2009
- Genre: Pop rock
- Label: Universal Music

Jonathan Fagerlund chronology
Flying (2008)	Welcome to My World (2009)

Singles from Welcome to My World
- 1. "Welcome to My Life" Released: March 2009

Welcome to My World is the second album by Swedish singer Jonathan Fagerlund following his debut album Flying. It includes the single "Welcome to My Life" that he performed in 2009 during Melodifestivalen 2009 in a bid to represent Sweden in Eurovision Song Contest 2009 to be held in Moscow, Russia.

== Track list ==
1. "Ready 4 It"
2. "Definite Maybe"
3. "Welcome to My Life"
4. "Tunnel Vision"
5. "Save Our Yesterdays"
6. "Think I'm Gonna Like It Here"
7. "Don't Worry"
8. "Magnifying Glass"
9. "Somebody Better"
10. "U Do"
11. "She Came Back For Me"
12. "Stay"
13. "Welcome to My Life (Mac D Remix)"

== Charts ==
Chart (2009)	Peak position
Swedish Albums (Sverigetopplistan)	53
