= No Pares de Sudar =

Studio album by Calle Ciega
- Released: 1999 (Original release); September 10, 2002
- Recorded: 1999
- Genre: Merengue
- Label: Hecho a Mano

Calle Ciega chronology
Caliente (1998)	No Pares de Sudar (1999)	Seguimos Bailando (2001)

No Pares de Sudar is the second album by Venezuelan group Calle Ciega, released in 1999 and re-released on September 10, 2002.

The album went platinum in Venezuela.

== Track listing ==
1. No Pares de Sudar
2. Pomposo
3. Solo Te Quiero Amar
4. El Marciano
5. Tengo Fiebre
6. Comienza a Menear
7. Que Tu Quieres
8. Imaginate
9. La Pantallera
10. Between You And I
