= Obsession (Shayne Ward song) =

Single by Shayne Ward

from the album Obsession
- Released: February 14, 2011
- Recorded: 2010
- Genre: R&B
- Length: 3:40
- Label: Sony
- Songwriter(s): Rami Yacoub, Savan Kotecha, Shayne Ward
- Producer(s): Rami Yacoub

Shayne Ward singles chronology
"Gotta Be Somebody" (2010)	"Obsession" (2011)	"Must Be a Reason Why" (2011)

Obsession is the second single from British singer Shayne Ward's third studio album, of the same name. It was released promotionally on February 14, 2011. Ward performed the single for the first time on The Alan Titchmarsh Show on the same day.

== Background ==
"Obsession" was produced by Rami Yacoub, and was written by Yacoub, Ward and Savan Kotecha. In an interview with Digital Spy, Ward revealed that he chose 'Obsession' as the album's second single: "Obsession is one of those love-ballads that is perfect for an occasion. In this case, it's out on Valentines Day, so i hope that the song appeals to couples who are madly in love."

== Track listing ==
1. "Obsession" - 3:40

== Chart performance ==
Chart (2011)	Peak Position
UK Singles (OCC)	97

== Release history ==
Country	Date	Format	Label
United Kingdom	14 February 2011	Digital download	Syco Music
