= Slow Motion (Lee.M and J. Pearl song) =

Single by Lee.M & J. Pearl featuring Iyaz & Snoop Dogg
- Released: 26 October 2012
- Genre: Electrohop, dance-pop, hip house
- Label: Strictly Rhythm

Lee.M singles chronology
"Slow Motion"	""Sadie's Got Her New Dress On" (as Lee Matthews)"

J. Pearl singles chronology
"Must Be a Reason Why" (2011)	"Slow Motion" (2012)

Iyaz singles chronology
"Pretty Girls" (2011)	"Slow Motion" (2012)	"Da Da Da" (2013)

Snoop Dogg singles chronology
"I Drink I Smoke" (2011)	"Slow Motion" (2012)	"Major Distribution" (2013)

"Slow Motion" is a single by Lee.M and J. Pearl featuring additional vocals from Iyaz and rap by Snoop Dogg. The "electro house" dance tune is the debut single of Lee Mulhern, who goes by the stage name Lee.M, and is credited to "Lee.M & J. Pearl featuring Iyaz and Snoop Dogg."

Lee Matthews (birth name Lee Mulhern) is an Irish solo singer and musical child prodigy, as well as a member of several boy band projects (Streetwize, Stateside and Access All Areas). He formed a musical relationship with Pete Doherty for a duo project called NXT-GEN. Lee Mulhern had received a request through his music manager to add his vocals for a possible song with Iyaz, after Snoop Dogg expressed interest in collaborating with the young singer, offering to add a rapping section to the song. Mulhern's vocals were recorded in Ireland and sent to Snoop Dogg's company, resulting in this debut single "Slow Motion," that was mixed in Los Angeles. The track was produced by Swiss producer David May.

J. Pearl is a New York–based American singer signed to Simply Delicious record label which is part of Strictly Rhythm Musical Group. Her music is described as "electro house" dance music. She was "discovered" by Strictly Rhythm A&R executive Dave Lambert and songwriter/producer Lucas Secon after a karaoke at a local bar singing Christina Aguilera's "Hurt". She recorded "It's Getting Physical" in 2010 as her debut release. Her commercial success came with the hit was "Must Be a Reason Why" to which were added the vocals of UK The X Factor season two winner Shayne Ward.

== Release ==
The single was released on 26 October 2012 as the debut single of Lee.M on the Strictly Rhythm label, featuring J. Pearl, an artist signed to the label.

Jupiter Ace mixed a pre-released version of the song from Strictly Rhythm in two versions as well, an extended version and a club mix version gained popularity.

== Music video ==
The music video was shot in Milan, Italy, and features Snoop Dogg's parts in Los Angeles, directed by renowned Italian music video director Claudio Zagarini.

== Track listing ==
1. "Slow Motion" (David May Radio Edit) [featuring Iyaz and Snoop Dogg] – 3:33
2. "Slow Motion" (Jupiter Ace Radio Edit) [featuring Iyaz and Snoop Dogg] – 3:34
3. "Slow Motion" (David May Extended Mix) [featuring Iyaz and Snoop Dogg] – 4:30
4. "Slow Motion" (Jupiter Ace Extended Mix) [featuring Iyaz and Snoop Dogg] – 5:20
5. "Slow Motion" (Jupiter Ace Club Mix) [featuring Iyaz and Snoop Dogg] – 5:03
6. "Slow Motion" (David May Euro Mix) [featuring Iyaz and Snoop Dogg] – 4:41
