= Jai Ho! (You Are My Destiny) =

2009 single by A. R. Rahman and The Pussycat Dolls

Single by A. R. Rahman and The Pussycat Dolls

from the album Doll Domination 2.0 and Doll Domination – The Mini Collection
- B-side: "Lights, Camera, Action"
- Released: February 23, 2009
- Genre: Pop; Indian pop; R&B
- Length: 3:44
- Label: Interscope; Celador
- Songwriters: A. R. Rahman; Nicole Scherzinger; Ester Dean; Ron Fair; Evan Bogart; Erika Nuri; David Quiñones; Nailah Thorbourne; Nyanda Thorbourne; Candace Thorbourne
- Producer: A. R. Rahman

A. R. Rahman singles chronology
"Jai Ho" (2008)	"Jai Ho! (You Are My Destiny)" (2009)	"Jai Jai Garavi Gujarat" (2010)

The Pussycat Dolls singles chronology
"Bottle Pop" (2009)	"Jai Ho! (You Are My Destiny)" (2009)	"Hush Hush; Hush Hush" (2009)

Nicole Scherzinger singles chronology
"Puakenikeni" (2007)	"Jai Ho! (You Are My Destiny)" (2009)	"Heartbeat" (2010)

Music video
- "Jai Ho! (You Are My Destiny)" on YouTube

"Jai Ho! (You Are My Destiny)" is a song by Indian composer A. R. Rahman and American girl group The Pussycat Dolls, recorded for the re-release of the group's second studio album Doll Domination (2008) and their EP Doll Domination – The Mini Collection (2009). It was released on February 23, 2009, by Interscope Records as the fourth single from the album and is an English remake of the original Hindi song "Jai Ho" which is taken from the soundtrack to the hit film Slumdog Millionaire (2008). The remake was conceived by record executives Jimmy Iovine and Ron Fair who tasked the Dolls' lead singer Nicole Scherzinger with creating a pop record that did not deviate from the original melody. Iovine and Fair also asked a number of other writers to create interpretations of the song, including Brick & Lace, The Writing Camp and Ester Dean. The final English version of "Jai Ho" was dubbed "Jai Ho! (You Are My Destiny)" and is sometimes also referred to as the "RF Mix" or "Ron Fair" Remix.

Upon its release, the song received positive reviews from music critics, who considered it as a great adaptation and praised Scherzinger's vocals. "Jai Ho! (You Are My Destiny)" was also commercially successful, debuting on the US Billboard Hot 100, at 100 before rising to number 15 the following week, registering one of the chart's biggest upward movements since the chart's conception. Additionally, the song topped the charts in Australia, Finland, Israel, Ireland, Greece, and Portugal, as well as peaking within the top ten of the charts in countries such as New Zealand and the United Kingdom. It was certified multiple platinum in Australia and platinum in New Zealand and the UK, where it sold over half a million copies.

An accompanying music video was shot in Vienna, Austria at the Tram Museum, recreating the last scene from Slumdog Millionaire. In the United Kingdom, the English-language version of the song was sung by various voice actors of British children's shows during the 2009 Children in Need Promotional dance video. It was also sung in The Official BBC Children in Need Medley, which topped the UK Singles Chart for two weeks in late 2009. The Pussycat Dolls have performed "Jai Ho! (You Are My Destiny)" during several live performances, including on Late Night with Jimmy Fallon, an episode of One Life to Live and during their Doll Domination Tour. Scherzinger's billing as a featured artist on the track sparked tension within the group, eventually leading to their disbandment in 2010 before reuniting in 2019.

== Background and development ==
"It's crazy how the whole thing came about, [...] I'm a writer, and I've been fortunate enough to write for the Dolls, but when they asked me to look at the movie and do my own version, I was really afraid to take on the task of rewriting the lyrics, [...] because I thought the movie was so profound, I didn't know how to make sure I kept the integrity of the movie and the love story, but also make it cool enough for the Pussycat Dolls and for people all over the world to connect to."

— Scherzinger on the process of recreating "Jai Ho!"

At the beginning of 2009, Billboard magazine stated that Doll Domination failed to make a commercial impact on the Billboard 200, unlike their previous effort PCD, which sold 3 million copies in the United States. Subsequently, Nicole Scherzinger confirmed that the current album would be re-released with new songs. In the interview she said: "it's a new life, a new push for Doll Domination. In this industry these days, that's what we're trying to do, always put new music out there and get people to pay attention. So this is a way for people to get new songs of ours and for people who haven't picked up the album so far to get another spin of our music."

After watching Slumdog Millionaire, record executives Ron Fair and Jimmy Iovine wanted to turn "Jai Ho" into a "pop record without deviating from the original melody". After Fair and Iovine were successful in getting a green-light from A. R. Rahman, they asked Scherzinger, the lead singer of the Pussycat Dolls, to write an interpretation of the song. Scherzinger was hesitant at first, stating in an interview that: "[...] I was scared to death to touch it [and] afraid for people to hear it before I even wrote it". Scherzinger put her "heart into writing the lyrics and put in themes from the film Slumdog Millionaire. Love and destiny were elements from the movie that [she] put into the track". She stated that she "prayed every night to do this right". Fair and Iovine additionally hired Brick & Lace, The Writing Camp and Ester Dean to write their own interpretation of the song.

E. Kidd Bogart, a member of The Writing Camp, stated that: "They [Fair and Iovine] wanted to get a bunch of different versions to see who could nail a version for the Pussycat Dolls." Once all interpretations were complete, "they [Fair and Iovine] took parts of The Writing Camp version, parts of Ester Dean's version, and parts of another version, and they put them together, and then Nicole [Scherzinger] and Ron [Fair] filled in the blanks that they thought were missing". Bogart additionally stated that it was "a very unique and awkward way of writing a song". Scherzinger, Fair, Dean, Bogart, Erika Nuri, David Quiñones, Candace Thorbourne, Nailah Thorbourne and Nyanda Thorbourne are credited for writing the track, while its production was handled by Fair and Scherzinger. The song was recorded in London, while Scherzinger and Rahman corresponded via webcam. Scherzinger's version replaces the original tune's Hindi words with English lyrics, including the chorus, "You are the reason that I breathe/ You are the reason that I still believe/ You are my destiny/ Jai ho." Stephanie Nolen of The Globe and Mail the lyrics as "racier than the original Hindi words by Indian poet Gulzar."

"Jai Ho! (You Are My Destiny)" premiered on DesiHits and was issued as a digital download on February 23, 2009, a day after Rahman won Best Original Song for "Jai Ho" and Best Original Score for the soundtrack of Slumdog Millionaire at the 81st Academy Awards. It became the group's first and only single where Scherzinger was billed as a featured artist.

== Critical reception ==
"Jai Ho! (You Are My Destiny)" (2009)
A 22-second sample of "Jai Ho! (You Are My Destiny)", a pop song that "stays true" to the original melody of "Jai Ho".

Bill Lamb from About.com gave the song 4.5 out of five stars. "The addition of the Pussycat Dolls to the song may have seemed a questionable decision at first glance, but it is this move that is likely to get the joyful explosion on to pop radio playlists. "Jai Ho!" abundantly deserves its place, and the vocals of head Pussycat Doll Nicole Scherzinger will have pop fans singing as well as dancing along. Look for this song to set up a long residency scaling pop charts around the world." Lamb also ranked the song number 56th on his Top 100 Pop Songs of 2009. Newsround praised the song by saying "[Nicole Scherzinger] sounds right at home – making the most of her soulful R&B voice and hitting all the (incredibly) high notes on this Eastern-themed piece of pop!" Nick Levine from Digital Spy wrote that, "The Hindi original, which soundtracks the Bollywood dance routine at the end of the movie, is far more urgent and atmospheric, but this remake works nicely enough as a slick, shamelessly opportunistic PCD single. Well, that hollered "JAI HO!" makes for a pretty sweet pop hook, you have to admit." MuchMusic ranked the song at number 2 on their Top 10 Soundtracks Songs in 2012.

== Commercial performance ==
In the United States, "Jai Ho! (You Are My Destiny)" was combined with "Jai Ho", debuting at number 100 on the US Billboard Hot 100, experiencing an increase of 248% and selling 22,000 downloads. The song rose to number 15 on the chart the next week after vaulting 85 positions, making "Jai Ho! (You Are My Destiny)" the biggest single-week jump from number 100 in the Hot 100's history and one of the biggest single-week jump overall. The song is also the highest-ranking Academy Award winner for Best Original Song since Eminem's "Lose Yourself" which peaked the summit for 12 weeks in 2002–2003. It experienced a near 500% sales increase, selling 130,000 downloads and claiming the week's greatest Digital Gainer on the Hot 100 chart. On the Hot Digital Tracks chart the two versions were listed separately, with the soundtrack version being more popular, selling 103,000 downloads. The Pussycat Dolls' version sold 27,000 downloads, however it did receive more radio airplay, debuting at number 47 on the Pop 100 Airplay with 5 million audience impressions. On the Mainstream Top 40, "Jai Ho! (You Are My Destiny)" debuted and peaked at number 37, becoming Rahman's first airplay hit and the Pussycat Dolls' eighth chart entry. On the Canadian Hot 100 it fared better, peaking at number four, seven weeks into the chart.

On March 23, 2009, the song debuted at number ten in Australia on the official ARIA Singles Chart, It ultimately peaked at number one, and became their second number one for two straight weeks. "Jai Ho! (You Are My Destiny)" was certified platinum by the Australian Recording Industry Association (ARIA) for shipment of 70,000 copies of the single. The song debuted at seventeen on the New Zealand Top 40 on 23 March 2010. It has peaked at number two.

In the United Kingdom, the song entered at number twenty on the UK Singles Chart. On April 11, 2009, the song peaked at number three up 35.5% selling 44,128 digital downloads. In April 2010, the song returned to the top 100 at number 60 selling 4,579 copies, after it was featured on Dancing on Ice finale. As of March 2026, "Jai Ho! (You Are My Destiny)" has sold over 1 million digital downloads and is the group's second best-selling single in the United Kingdom. Across Europe, the song reached the top five in Belgium (Flanders and Wallonia), Finland, Croatia and Italy.

In France, "Jai Ho (You Are My Destiny)" debuted at number 5 early May 2009, becoming Pussycat Dolls's third top five and Scherzinger's first. Two weeks later, the song peaked at number 3, tying with "I Hate This Part", remaining 5 weeks at the top three and 32 weeks in total. "Jai Ho (You are My Destiny)" is the group's third longest-running song on the French Singles Chart after "When I Grow Up", tying with "I Hate This Part".

== Music video ==
=== Background and synopsis ===
An accompanying music video for "Jai Ho! (You Are My Destiny)" was directed by Thomas Kloss, in the Vienna Transport Museum Remise, a tramway museum in Vienna, Austria, while A. R. Rahman filmed his scenes in Los Angeles days before the 81st Academy Awards. The video premiered on the VH1 Top 20 Video Countdown on March 21, 2009. The clip recreates the last scene from the movie, Slumdog Millionaire. The video starts off where Scherzinger is followed by a mystery man through the marketplace, while her bandmates record him. On the second verse, Scherzinger is separated from the rest of the group and sings and dances. Several clips of Rahman appear throughout the video, enhanced with special effects and filmed against a green screen. The remainder of the video focuses on dance routines inspired by Bollywood. Due to unknown reasons, the video uploaded on YouTube is blocked in India.

=== Reception ===
DesiHits praised the video. "The rhythmic beats of the drums, coupled with the scintillating dance moves is sure to get you on your feet. You've already heard the remix of the song, but the video adds another dimension thanks to the captivating scenes in it." Daniel from MTV Buzzworthy agreed with Banes. "The video is an elaborate dance extravaganza, the kind made famous by suddenly super-hip Bollywood movies. And you know what? It fits. Like a midriff-revealing sari, it fits." On 4 August 2009, it was announced that the video was nominated for Best Choreography at the 2009 MTV Video Music Awards.

== Live performances ==
The Pussycat Dolls first performed "Jai Ho! (You Are My Destiny)" for the first time on television on Late Night with Jimmy Fallon on March 10, 2009, wearing Indian-inspired outfits. The Pussycat Dolls later performed the track as part of their set list on the North American leg of The Circus Starring Britney Spears. The group went on to perform on MuchOnDemand on March 18 along with "I Hate This Part", a medley with "When I Grow Up" on the 2009 Kids' Choice Awards on March 28 and on The Ellen DeGeneres Show on April 20. They performed the song on the TV show One Life to Live, during the episode called "Driving Miss Destiny". The performance took place at the prom of the fictional Llanview High School as reward for winning a radio contest. The episode was aired on May 13. The song was included as one of the encore songs on the set list the Pussycat Dolls' Doll Domination Tour (2009) before ending with "When I Grow Up". During the tour, the group's dissatisfaction over Scherzinger's prominence led to a public outburst by Melody Thornton. While opening for The Circus Starring Britney Spears (2009) in Glendale, Arizona, Melody Thornton addressed the crowd during their break saying, "[...] let me give a shout-out to my family. Thank you for supporting me, even if I'm not featured" referring to the billing of the song, and encouraging the audience to follow their dreams and to "never let anyone stomp on them, ever." Less than a year later, the group formerly disbanded following an initial hiatus. Scherzinger would later go on to perform "Jai Ho! (You Are My Destiny)" as part of a Pussycat Dolls medley during her own 2012 solo tour, Killer Love, in support of her debut album Killer Love.

== Track listing ==
- Digital download
1. "Jai Ho! (You Are My Destiny)"
- CD single
1. "Jai Ho! (You Are My Destiny)"
2. "Lights, Camera, Action" (featuring New Kids on the Block)
- CD maxi single
1. "Jai Ho! (You Are My Destiny)"
2. "I Hate This Part" (Dave Audé Remix – Club)
3. "Bottle Pop" (Moto Blanco Club Mix)
4. "Jai Ho! (You Are My Destiny)" (music video)

- On some editions of the CD single, "Jai Ho! You Are My Destiny" is referred to as the "RF Mix".

== Personnel ==
Credits adapted from the liner notes of Doll Domination and CD liner notes.

- The Pussycat Dolls – primary artist
- Deepak P.A. – engineering
- Ron Fair – additional production, vocal production
- Tal Herzberg – engineering, Pro Tools
- Peter Mokran – mixing
- A. R. Rahman – primary artist, musical production, composer
- Nicole Scherzinger – featured artist, vocal production
- H. Sridhar – engineering

== Charts ==
=== Weekly charts ===
Weekly chart performance for "Jai Ho! (You Are My Destiny)"
Chart (2009–2010)	Peak position
Australia (ARIA)	1
Australia Urban (ARIA)	1
Austria (Ö3 Austria Top 40)	18
Belgium (Ultratop 50 Flanders)	3
Belgium (Ultratop 50 Wallonia)	5
Canada Hot 100 (Billboard)	4
Canada CHR/Top 40 (Billboard)	25
CIS Airplay (TopHit)	10
Croatia (HRT)	4
Czech Republic Airplay (ČNS IFPI)	2
European Hot 100 Singles (Billboard)	2
France (SNEP)	3
Finland (Suomen virallinen lista)	1
Germany (GfK)	29
Greece (Billboard)	1
Hungary (Rádiós Top 40)	37
Iceland (Tónlistinn)	5
Ireland (IRMA)	1
Israel (Media Forest)	1
Italy (FIMI)	2
Netherlands (Single Top 100)	42
New Zealand (Recorded Music NZ)	2
Portugal (Billboard)	1
Romania Airplay (Media Forest)	4
Romania TV Airplay (Media Forest)	1
Russia Airplay (TopHit)	7
Slovakia Airplay (ČNS IFPI)	4
Sweden (Sverigetopplistan)	40
Switzerland (Schweizer Hitparade)	7
UK Singles (Official Charts)	3
UK Airplay (Music Week)	1
US Billboard Hot 100	15
US Dance/Electronic Digital Song Sales (Billboard)	26
US Dance Airplay (Billboard)	23
US Pop Airplay (Billboard)	37

=== Year-end charts ===
Year-end chart performance of "Jai Ho! (You Are My Destiny)"
Chart (2009)	Position
Australia (ARIA)	15
Australia Digital Songs (ARIA)	12
Australia Urban (ARIA)	5
Belgium (Ultratop 50 Flanders)	32
Belgium (Ultratop 50 Wallonia)	30
Brazil (Crowley)	71
Canada (Canadian Hot 100)	50
CIS (TopHit)	52
Croatia International Airplay (HRT)	13
Finland (Musiikkituottajat)	4
France (SNEP)	21
Hungary (Rádiós Top 40)	163
Ireland (IRMA)	19
Italy (FIMI)	15
New Zealand (RIANZ)	16
Russia Airplay (TopHit)	52
Switzerland (Swiss Hitparade)	71
Taiwan (Hito Radio)	31
UK Singles (OCC)	26

=== Decade-end charts ===
Decade-end chart performance of "Jai Ho! (You Are My Destiny)"
Chart (2000–09)	Position
Australia (ARIA)	73

== Certifications ==
Region	Certification	Certified units/sales
Australia (ARIA)	4× Platinum	280,000^{‡}
New Zealand (RMNZ)	Platinum	15,000^{*}
United Kingdom (BPI)	Platinum	1,000,000
^{*} Sales figures based on certification alone.^{‡} Sales+streaming figures based on certification alone.

== Release history ==
Release dates and formats for "Jai Ho! (You Are My Destiny)"
Region	Date	Format(s)	Label(s)	Ref.
Canada	February 23, 2009	Digital download	Universal Music	
United States	February 23, 2009	Digital download	Interscope; Celador	
United States	March 2, 2009	Contemporary hit radio	Interscope; Celador	
United States	March 4, 2009	Alternative radio	Interscope; Celador	
Sweden	March 9, 2009	Digital download	Universal Music	
Spain	March 10, 2009	Digital download	Universal Music	
Ireland	March 12, 2009	Digital download	Universal Music	
United Kingdom	March 15, 2009	Digital download	Polydor; Celador	
Australia	March 16, 2009	Digital download	Universal Music	
France	March 16, 2009	Digital download	Universal Music	
Germany	March 27, 2009	Digital download	Universal Music	
United Kingdom	April 13, 2009	CD	Polydor; Celador	
Germany	April 24, 2009	CD; maxi CD	Universal Music	
France	April 27, 2009	CD	Polydor	

== See also ==
- List of number-one singles of 2009 (Australia)
- List of number-one singles of 2009 (Finland)
- List of number-one singles of 2009 (Ireland)
- List of best-selling singles of the 2000s (Australia)
- List of number-one digital tracks of 2009 (Australia)
- List of Top 50 Australian chart achievements and trivia
- List of best-selling music downloads of the 2000s in the United Kingdom
