= I Drink I Smoke =

Single by Belly featuring Snoop Dogg

from the album Sleepless Nights 1.5
- Released: October 25, 2011 (ITunes)
- Recorded: 2011
- Genre: Hip hop
- Length: 3:48
- Label: CP Records
- Songwriters: Ahmad Balshe; Calvin Broadus
- Producer: Hugo Diaz

Belly singles chronology
"Hit Me Up" (2011)	"I Drink I Smoke" (2011)	"Full Circle" (2012)

Snoop Dogg singles chronology
"Young, Wild & Free" (2011)	"I Drink I Smoke" (2011)	"Slow Motion" (2012)

Music video
- "I Drink I Smoke" on YouTube

"I Drink I Smoke" is a song by Canadian rapper Belly featuring American rapper Snoop Dogg. It was released on October 25, 2011 as the fourth single off the former's mixtape Sleepless Nights 1.5 (2012). The song, the second collaboration between both artists since 2009's "Hot Girl", only charted in Bulgaria by peaking at number 32.

The accompanying music video for the song, directed by RT!, took place in Amsterdam and features both artists having a drug-fueled adventure.

== Music video ==
The video was directed by Canadian director RT! and was shot in Amsterdam. The video premiered on April 20, 2012 to coincide with International Smokers Day. The video starts with an aerial shot with the following caption: Amsterdam, Partly Cloudly, Chance of Rain...High. It cuts to Belly inside Dutch Flowers (a coffee shop in Spui) reading the menu containing items related to cannabis. A waiter serves Belly his dish and as he puts down the menu, he sees that his dish is a plate of hash. While being confused by this, Belly notices something raining outside and leaves the restaurant to see that its raining kush. As he walks through the streets feeling all happy, he lifts off a tarp to reveal a Chevrolet Impala. He drives along the streets in the Impala with a girl while collecting the raining kush in the backseat. Intercut through the video are scenes of Belly and Snoop along with their entourage and a bunch of women at night in front of the 'I Amsterdam' sign through a rainbow filter that makes the audience feel like their tripping acid. After that, it cuts back to Belly inside the coffee shop where he sees that his plate of kush is empty (implying that everything that happened to Belly was all in his head).

The video ends with this statement: "No buds were harmed in the ~~smoking~~ making of this video."

== Remix ==
On August 9, 2012, A remix version was released featuring American rapper Gunplay.

== Chart performance ==
The song failed to chart in Canada or America, but it managed to peak at number 32 in Bulgaria.

Chart (2012)	Peak Position
Bulgaria Singles Top 40	32
