= Do You Believe (Julie-Anne Dineen song) =

Single by Julie-Anne Dineen
- Released: March 2009
- Recorded: 2009
- Songwriter(s): Philip Scanlon

Julie-Anne Dineen singles chronology
"Do You Believe" (2009)	"River Deep – Mountain High" (2009)

"Do You Believe" is a charity single by Julie-Anne Dineen that was released in March 2009 reaching number 1 on the Irish Singles Chart staying top for 1 week. The song was written by Philip Scanlon. The proceeds of the single went to the Symptomatic Breast Cancer unit at the Mid-Western Regional Hospital in Ireland, where Dineen had just finished treatment for breast cancer. She has just completed a tour of Limerick schools where she performed her chart topping song and spreading a cancer aware message. She followed her chart success with a Top 3 hit in Ireland, a cover of "River Deep – Mountain High" released in October 2009.

== Charts ==
Chart (2009)	Peak position
Irish Singles Chart	1

== See also ==
- List of number-one singles of 2009 (Ireland)
