= Reichsbrücke =

Bridge in Vienna, Austria

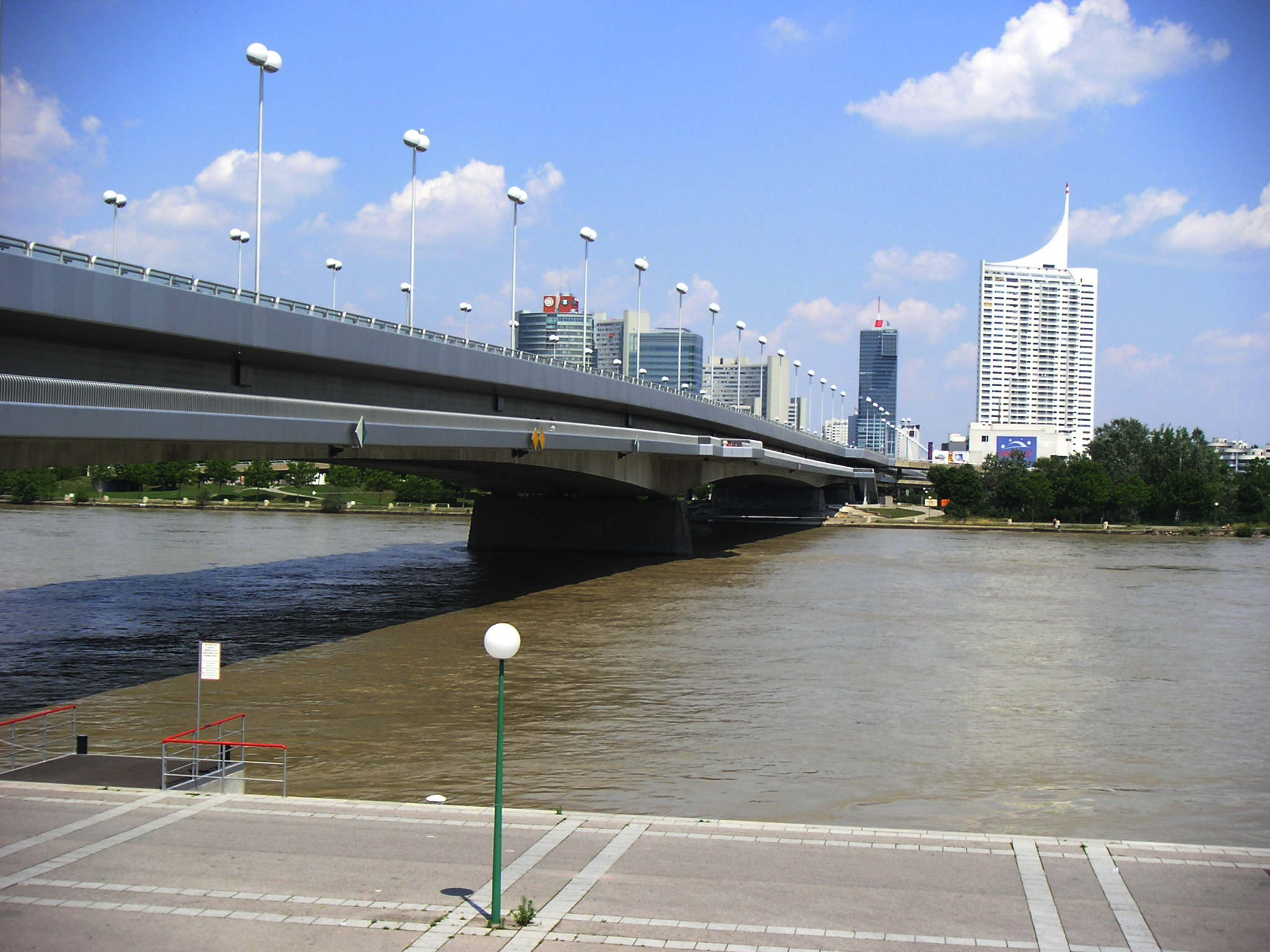
- Reichsbrücke, seen from the right bank of the Danube
- Coordinates: 48°13′42″N 16°24′36″E
- Carried: Light rail (tramway), road bridge
- Crossed: Danube River
- Locale: Vienna, Austria
- Official name: Johann-Nestroy-Brücke
- Maintained by: Stadt Wien (3rd bridge)
- Preceded by: Reichsbrücke (1937); Reichsbrücke (1876)

Characteristics
- Design: haunched, hollow box cantilever bridge with double deck (3rd bridge)
- Material: Prestressed concrete (3rd bridge)
- Total length: approximately 528 metres (1,732 ft) (3rd bridge)

History
- Construction start: 1872 (1st bridge); 1934 (2nd bridge); 1978 (3rd bridge)
- Construction end: 1876 (1st bridge); 1937 (2nd bridge); 1980 (3rd bridge)
- Collapsed: 1976-08-01 (2nd bridge)

Location
- Interactive map of Reichsbrücke

The Reichsbrücke (German for Imperial Bridge) is a major bridge in Vienna, linking Mexikoplatz in Leopoldstadt with the Donauinsel in Donaustadt across the Danube. The bridge is used by 50,000 vehicles per day and carries six lanes of traffic, U-Bahn tracks, two footpaths, two cyclepaths and two utility tunnels.

== History ==
The first bridge to be built on the site of the current Reichsbrücke was constructed in 1872–1876 under the name Kronprinz-Rudolph-Brücke (Crown Prince Rudolf Bridge), before the regulation of the Danube in Vienna. A truss of iron girders spanned the main river, with vaulted bridges crossing the flood plains on either side. It was formally opened on 21 August 1876, and the name was changed to Reichsbrücke in 1919 after Austria became a republic.

As a measure to reduce the level of unemployment in the 1930s, a suspension bridge was planned to take the place of the old Reichsbrücke. The technical plans were drawn up by the architects Siegfried Theiß and Hans Jaksch, with artistic control being given to Clemens Holzmeister. The pillars of the old bridge were extended downstream and the structure was shifted by 26 m in less than seven hours.

The new bridge could thus be built on the line of the old bridge without long-lasting disruptions to traffic. This suspension bridge, built between 1934 and 1937, carried four lanes of traffic, two tram lines and footpaths on both sides. The bridges over the flood plains were also expanded. The new bridge was opened on 10 October 1937 by Cardinal Innitzer and Bundespräsident Wilhelm Miklas.

During the Second World War, the Reichsbrücke was the only one of Vienna's bridges over the Danube not to suffer serious damage. The Soviet troops attacking the city arrived in time to prevent the bridge being destroyed by the defending Wehrmacht, and as a result, the bridge was renamed Brücke der Roten Armee (Red Army Bridge) for a while. The bridge was renovated between 1948 and 1952. In 1948, the bridge was used as a location in the film The Third Man.

=== Reichsbrücke collapse ===
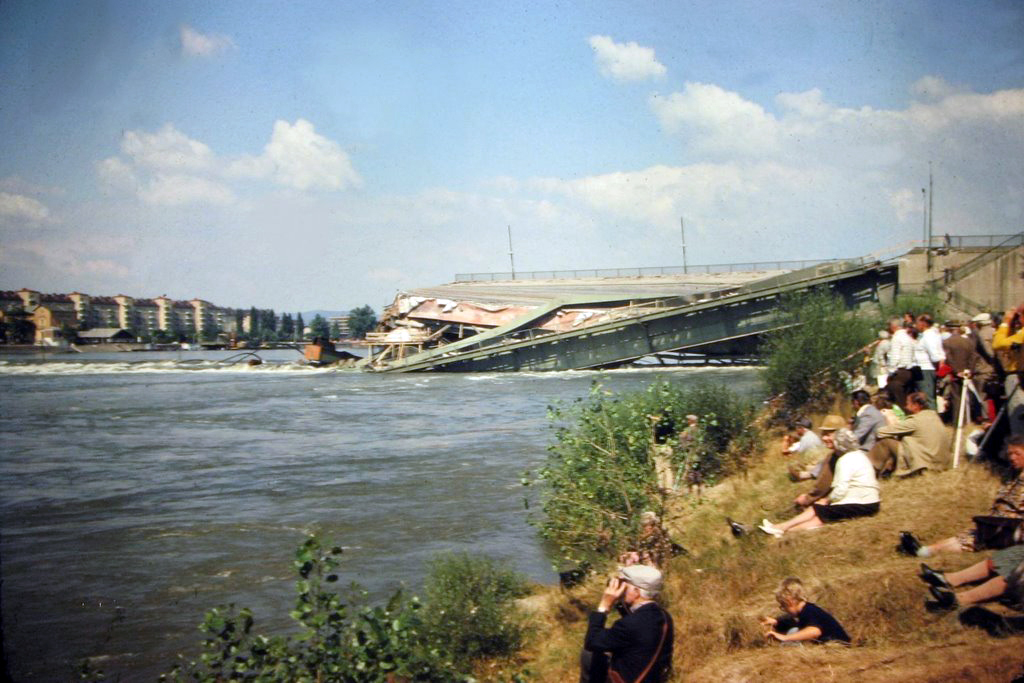
Sightseers after the collapse in 1976

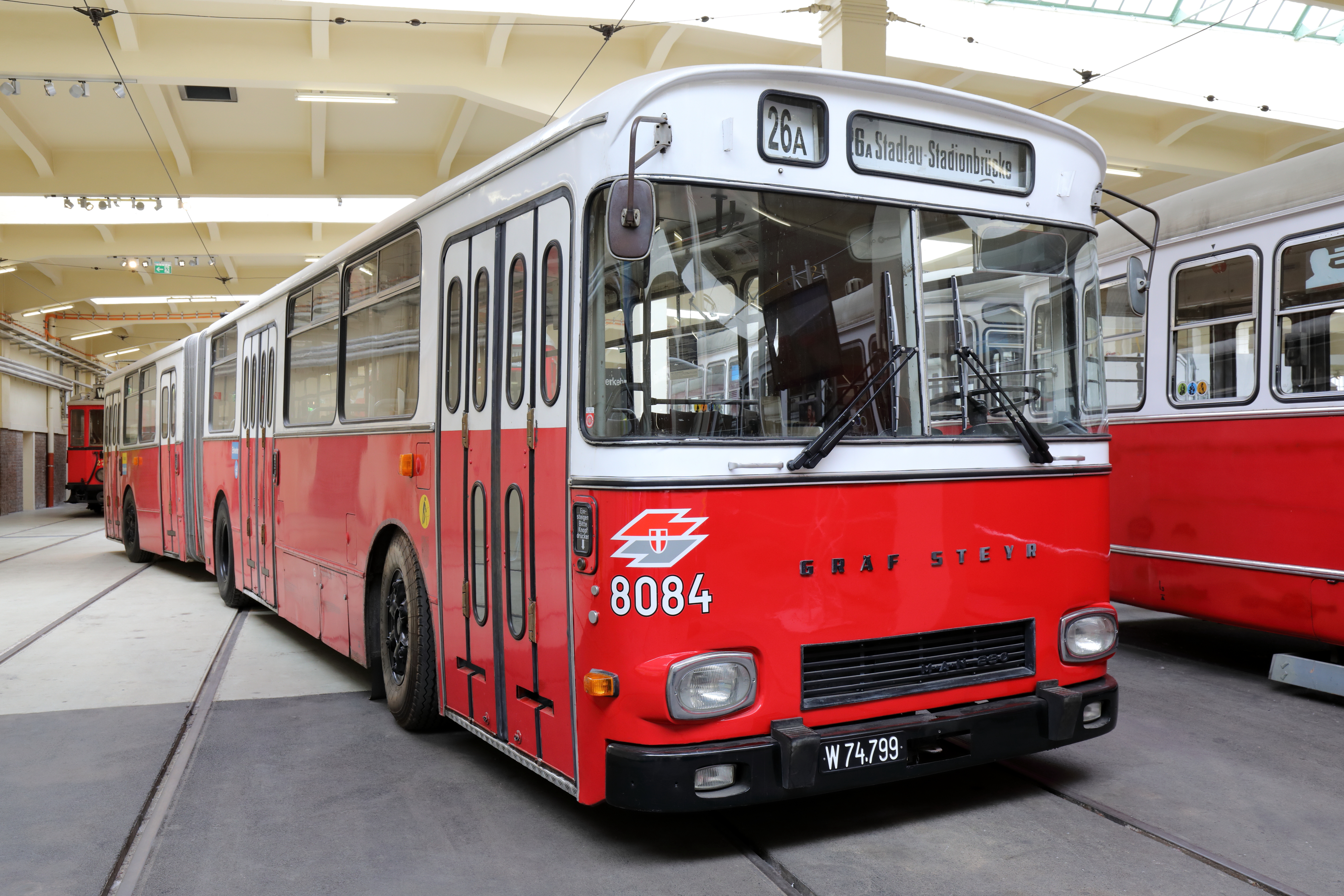
The bus salvaged from the collapse on display at the transport museum Remise

On 1 August 1976, shortly before 05:00, the bridge collapsed, killing one person. The main reason for the collapse was determined to be a structural failure in the bearings, which was not spotted during inspection due to the massive granite mantle that surrounded them. One lorry was destroyed and several ships damaged. The driver of an empty city bus was able to save himself, and his bus was salvaged and continued to be used until 1989; it now resides in Vienna's transport museum Remise. Shipping was diverted through the Donaukanal. Two supplementary bridges were hurriedly raised to carry the traffic and the trams, and were in use for four years.

=== Current bridge ===
An international competition was launched for the design of the new bridge, and was won by a project named after Johann Nestroy. Construction began in 1978, and the bridge was formally opened on 8 November 1980 by city councillor Heinz Nittel, under the name Johann-Nestroy-Brücke, a name which has not caught on.

The Viennese U-Bahn network was routed over the Reichsbrücke for the first time on 3 September 1982.

In 2003, the periphery of the bridge was overhauled, together with the lighting, and the footpaths and cyclepaths were widened. At the same time, the width of lanes was increased by reducing the width of the central reservation and removing the narrow emergency sidewalks.

A German passenger ship rammed one pillar of the Reichsbrücke in 2004, severely injuring several people. The bridge was undamaged by the accident.

On Saturday 9 July 2005, the 25th anniversary of the building of the Reichsbrücke was celebrated, and the restoration was finished. The tarmac was treated with a special noise-absorbing layer, and three new night bus stops were built.

The bridge contains the Donauinsel station of the Vienna U-Bahn.
