= Caliente (Calle Ciega album) =

1998 studio album by Calle Ciega

Studio album by Calle Ciega
- Released: 1998 (Original release); August 6, 2002 (Re-release)
- Recorded: 1998
- Genre: Merengue
- Label: Hecho a Mano

Calle Ciega chronology
Caliente (00000004)	No Pares de Sudar (1999)

Caliente is the debut album by Venezuelan group Calle Ciega released in 1998, and re-released on August 6, 2002.

== Track listing ==
1. Que Sigan Bailando
2. Caliente
3. El Huracán
4. Calle Ciega
5. Con La Punta 'El Pie
6. Meneate
7. Sexy
8. Hay Fuego
9. Quiero Que Tu Piel Se Erice
10. Me Gustan Nenas Sexy
11. Si Tu No Estás
12. Una Fan Enamorada
