= Closer (Shayne Ward album) =

Studio album by Shayne Ward
- Released: 12 April 2015
- Recorded: 2014–2015
- Genre: Pop; R&B
- Length: 35:14
- Label: MPG
- Producer: Mike Stock; Jimmy Junior

Shayne Ward chronology
Obsession (2010)	Closer (2015)

Singles from Closer
- 1. "My Heart Would Take You Back" Released: 13 April 2015; 2. "The Way You Were" Released: 21 June 2015; 3. "Moving Target" Released: 16 October 2015

Closer is the fourth studio album by English pop singer Shayne Ward. It was released on 12 April 2015, as Ward's first independent release, funded through PledgeMusic. The album marks the debut release from MPG, a joint venture between Ward and music producer Mike Stock. The album features writing credits by Ward, Stock, Laura Walton and Johan Kalel, with production provided exclusively by Stock and Jimmy Junior. Recording took place between 2014 and 2015 in Stock's West Sussex studio.

== Background ==
In 2011, it was reported that Syco Music had not renewed their recording contract with Ward due to the relative commercial failure of his third studio album, Obsession. It was announced in 2014 that Shayne will release his fourth album with Mike Stock and PledgeMusic. Stock confirmed that the entire album was recorded and produced using solar power.

== Singles ==
The first single "My Heart Would Take You Back" premiered on BBC Radio 2 on the Ken Bruce show on 24 February 2015 to a positive reception. Shayne Ward said of the song: "I sat down with Mike and said, 'I love The Stylistics, Temptations, The Chi-Lites and I would love to write something along the lines of that. I thought it would end up as an album track but from the moment we sent it to management, they jumped at it and said, 'We have to go with this as the lead track.'"

A video for "The Way You Were" was released on 2 June 2015 with remixes due for release on 21 June.

== Track listing ==
No.	Title	Writer(s)	Length
1.	"My Heart Would Take You Back"	Stock; Kalel; Laura Walton; Ward	3:28
2.	"Moving Target"	Mike Stock; Johan Kalel; Shayne Ward	3:03
3.	"I Never Said"	Stock; Kalel; Ward	3:15
4.	"The Way You Were"	Stock; Kalel; Walton; Ward	3:44
5.	"Too Much To Lose"	Stock; Walton; Ward	3:37
6.	"Crying, Lying Eyes"	Stock; Kalel; Walton; Ward	3:13
7.	"I'm So Proud of You"	Stock; Kalel; Walton; Ward	3:52
8.	"Make It Simple"	Stock; Kalel; Walton; Ward	3:10
9.	"Fake"	Stock; Kalel; Walton; Ward	3:13
10.	"I Let You Get Away"	Stock; Kalel; Ward	3:11

Deluxe Edition Bonus Tracks
No.	Title	Writer(s)	Length
11.	"Rendez-Vous, The Place I Love"	Stock; Kalel; Ward	4:05
12.	"About You Now"	Cathy Dennis; Lukasz Gottwald	3:48
13.	"If You Were Here Tonight"	Monte Moir	4:12
14.	"No Promises"	Jonas Schrøder; Lucas Sieber	3:28
15.	"My Heart Would Take You Back" (The JRMX Remix)	Stock; Kalel; Walton; Ward	5:31
16.	"My Heart Would Take You Back" (Voice Memo)
17.	"Make It Simple" (Voice Memo)
18.	"Moving Target" (Voice Memo)

== Charts ==
Chart (2015)	Peak position
Irish Albums (IRMA)	16
Irish Independent Albums (IRMA)	7
Scottish Albums (OCC)	24
UK Albums (OCC)	17
UK Album Downloads (OCC)	38
UK Independent Albums (OCC)	2

== Release history ==
List of release dates, showing region, formats, label, editions, and reference
Region	Date	Format(s)	Label	Edition(s)	Ref.
Various	12 April 2015	CD; digital download	MPG; PledgeMusic	Standard; deluxe	
United Kingdom	13 April 2015	CD; digital download	MPG; PledgeMusic	Standard; deluxe	
