= My Heart Would Take You Back =

Single by Shayne Ward

from the album Closer
- Released: 12 April 2015
- Recorded: 2014
- Genre: Pop
- Length: 3:29
- Label: MPG
- Songwriters: Mike Stock; Johan Kalel; Laura Walton; Shayne Ward

Shayne Ward singles chronology
"Must Be a Reason Why" (2011)	"My Heart Would Take You Back" (2015)	"The Way You Were" (2015)

"My Heart Would Take You Back" is a song by British singer Shayne Ward. The song was released in the United Kingdom as a digital download on 12 April 2015. It was released as the lead single from his fourth studio album Closer (2015). The song was written by Mike Stock, Johan Kalel, Laura Walton and Shayne Ward.

== Background ==
The song premiered on BBC Radio 2 on the Ken Bruce show on 24 February 2015 to a positive reception. Shayne Ward said of the song: "I sat down with Mike and said, 'I love The Stylistics, Temptations, The Chi-Lites and I would love to write something along the lines of that. I thought it would end up as an album track but from the moment we sent it to management, they jumped at it and said, 'We have to go with this as the lead track.'"

== Music video ==
A music video to accompany the release of "My Heart Would Take You Back" was first released onto YouTube on 26 March 2015 at a total length of three minutes and thirty-six seconds.

== Track listing ==
Digital download
No.	Title	Length
1.	"My Heart Would Take You Back"	3:29

== Chart performance ==
=== Weekly charts ===
Chart (2015)	Peak position
UK Singles (Official Charts Company)	166
UK Independent Singles (Official Charts Company)	8

== Release history ==
Region	Date	Format	Label
United Kingdom	12 April 2015	Digital download	MPG
