= Julie-Anne Dineen =

Irish singer (died 2011)

Julie-Anne Dineen

Julie-Anne Dineen (died November 2011) was an Irish singer. She survived breast cancer and was an ambassador for fundraising for the cause.

In March 2009, her single "Do You Believe" reached #1 on the Irish Singles Chart. The record's proceeds went to the Symptomatic Breast Cancer unit at the Mid-Western Regional Hospital in Ireland, where Dineen had just finished treatment for breast cancer. She completed a tour of Limerick schools where she performed the song. In October 2009, Dineen's cover of "River Deep – Mountain High" reached #2 on Irish charts.

Dineen died in November 2011.

== Discography ==
- March 2009: "Do You Believe" (reached #1 in the Irish Singles Chart)
- October 2009: "River Deep – Mountain High" (reached #2 in the Irish Singles Chart)
