= J. Pearl =

American singer

- Origin: New York City, United States
- Occupation: Singer
- Instrument: Vocals
- Years active: 2010 - 2012

J. Pearl is a New York City-based American singer signed to Simply Delicious record label which is part of Strictly Rhythm Musical Group. Her music is described as "electro house" dance music.

Her start in music was through a number of local school musical projects. After high school, and while studying pre-Med in New York's Columbia University, she became part of the university's a cappella group called the Columbia Clefhangers.

She was "discovered" by Strictly Rhythm A&R executive Dave Lambert and songwriter/producer Lucas Secon after a karaoke at a local bar singing Christina Aguilera's "Hurt".

She recorded "It's Getting Physical" in 2010 as her debut release. Her commercial success came with the hit was "Must Be a Reason Why" to which were added the vocals of UK The X Factor season two winner Shayne Ward.

She returned in 2012 through an even bigger collaboration with the song "Slow Motion" featuring Iyaz & Snoop Dogg. It is J. Pearl's third single and the debut single of the Irish singer Lee.M (full name Lee Mulhern, later known as Lee Matthews). It was released in October 2012 on Strictly Rhythm.

== Discography ==
=== Singles ===
- 2010: "It's Getting Physical"
- 2011: "Must Be a Reason Why" (featuring Shayne Ward) (charted in Spain reaching No. 26 and in Danish Dance Charts at #31)
- 2012: "Slow Motion" (with Lee.M featuring Iyaz & Snoop Dogg)
- Unreleased Album, Recorded from 2010 - 2011, Note: not officially released.
