= Welcome to My Life (Jonathan Fagerlund song) =

Single by Jonathan Fagerlund

from the album Welcome to My World
- Released: March 2009
- Genre: Pop / Rock
- Length: 3:00
- Label: Universal Music Sweden
- Songwriters: Didrik Thott, Samuel Waermö

Jonathan Fagerlund singles chronology
"Playing Me" (2009)	"Welcome to My Life" (2009)

Music video
- "Welcome to My Life" on YouTube

"Welcome to My Life" is a pop/rock song by Swedish singer Jonathan Fagerlund. The song took part in the Melodifestivalen 2009, in a bid to represent Sweden in Eurovision Song Contest 2009.

The song was written by Didrik Thott and Samuel Waermö and performed by Fagerlund accompanied by an all-female backing band on the first semifinal of the competition on 7 February 2009 inside Scandinavium in Gothenburg. The song failed to make to the final rounds.

But despite that, the song proved popular with the Swedish public and was released as a single accompanied by a music video in which Fagerlund roams the streets of Stockholm and various venues with his love interest on a motorcycle. The single made it to number 23 on Sverigetopplistan, the Swedish Singles Chart in its first week of release and stayed three weeks in the charts. The single was his follow-up to his single "Playing Me" that had made to number 4 in the Swedish Charts.

The track was included in Fagerlund's second album also called Welcome to My World that also made it to the Sverigetopplistan Albums Chart peaking at number 53 in addition to being one of the tracks in the compilation album Melodifestivalen 2009.

== Charts ==
Chart (2009)	Peak position
Sweden (Sverigetopplistan)	23
