= Christian Rapp (author) =

Austrian writer, cultural scientist, and exhibition curator (born 1964)

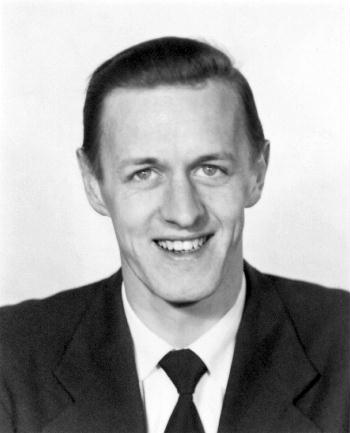
Christian Rapp

Christian Rapp (born 1964 in Vienna) is an Austrian writer, cultural scientist and exhibition curator.

== Early life and education ==
Christian Rapp studied theater, media, and art history at the University of Vienna.

== Career ==
From 1988 to 1990, Rapp was cultural editor of the "AZ" and the curator.

He has been working as an exhibition curator since 1990, focusing on urban history, contemporary history, traffic and tourism history. He has curated exhibitions for the Vienna Museum of Science and Technology, the Vienna Museum, the Jewish Museum Vienna, the Lower Austrian Provincial Exhibition and others.

In 1995, Rapp was with the work Höhenrausch. The German Mountain Film.

Since 2002, he has been a lecturer at the Institute for European Ethnology of the University of Vienna. From 2004 to 2008, he was a lecturer in the post-graduate course "ECM-Exhibition and Cultural Communication Management" of the University of Applied Arts Vienna.

On 1 January 2018, he followed Stefan Karner as scientific director in the History of Lower Austria and Rapp became the new leader in the House of History.

== Academic Positions and Roles ==
Since January 2018, Christian Rapp has served as the scientific director of the Haus der Geschichte (House of History) at the Museum Niederösterreich, where he has curated and overseen numerous exhibitions on Austrian cultural and social history. He also lectures at the University of Vienna, the University of Applied Arts Vienna, and New Design University St. Pölten, specializing in cultural studies and exhibition management.

== Curatorial Work and Projects ==
He has curated exhibitions for major institutions such as the Technisches Museum Wien, Wien Museum, Jüdisches Museum Wien, and the Niederösterreichische Landesausstellung. His curatorial focus is on urban history, contemporary history, transportation, and tourism.

== Entrepreneurial Activities ==
In 2003, together with Nadia Rapp-Wimberger, he founded "rapp&wimberger, Kultur- und Medienprojekte," an agency for cultural and media projects.

== International Engagement ==
Beyond Austria, Rapp has contributed to museum and exhibition projects internationally and has participated as a speaker and consultant at various international conferences and events.

== Publications ==
- Höhenrausch. Der deutsche Bergfilm. Sonderzahl, Wien um 1997, ISBN 3-85449-108-5.
- with Ulrike Felber, Elke Krasny: Smart Exports. Österreich auf den Weltausstellungen 1851–2000. Brandstätter, Wien 2000, ISBN 3-85498-068-X.
- with Wolfgang Kos: Alt-Wien: die Stadt, die niemals war. Czernin, Wien 2004, ISBN 3-7076-0193-5.
- with Nadia Rapp-Wimberger: Arbeite, Sammle, Vermehre. Von der ersten Oesterreichischen Spar-Casse zur Erste Bank. Brandstätter, Wien 2005, ISBN 3-85498-404-9.
- Spurwechsel. Wien lernt Auto fahren. Brandstätter, Wien 2006, ISBN 3-902510-84-6 (Ausstellungskatalog: Technisches Museum, Wien, 12. Oktober 2006 – 28. Februar 2007)
- with Elke Doppler, Sándor Békési (Hrsg.): Am Puls der Stadt. 2000 Jahre Karlsplatz. Czernin, Wien 2008, ISBN 978-3-7076-0279-1.
- with Matthias Beitl, Nadia Rapp-Wimberger (Hrsg.): Wer hat, der hat. Eine illustrierte Geschichte des Sparens. Metro, Wien 2009, ISBN 978-3-902517-96-8.
- with Markus Kristan: Worauf freut sich der Wiener wenn er vom Urlaub kommt? Ankerbrot. Die Geschichte einer großen Bäckerei. Brandstätter, Wien 2011, ISBN 978-3-85033-555-3.
- with Nadia Rapp-Wimberger: Bad Ischl – Mit und ohne Kaiser. Brandstätter, Wien 2016, ISBN 978-3-85033-991-9.

== Exhibitions ==
- with Elke Krasny, Nadia Rapp-Wimberger: Von Samoa zum Isonzo. Die Fotografin und Reisejournalistin Alice Schalek. Jüdisches Museum Wien, 1999.
- with Gertraud Liesenfeld, Klara Löffler, Michael Weese: Nichtstun. Vom Flanieren, Pausieren, Blaumachen und Müssiggehen. Österreichisches Museum für Volkskunde Wien, 2000.
- with Wolfgang Kos: Alt Wien. Die Stadt, die niemals war. Wien Museum 2004.
- Spurwechsel – Wien lernt Autofahren. Technisches Museum Wien 2005.
- with Nadia Rapp-Wimberger: Österreichische Riviera – Wien entdeckt das Meer. Wien Museum 2013.
- with Peter Fritz u. a.: Jubel und Elend – Leben mit dem Großen Krieg 1914–1918. Schallaburg 2014.
- Verkehrsmuseum Remise 2014
