= Playing Me =

Single by Jonathan Fagerlund

from the album Flying
- Released: 20 February 2008
- Genre: Pop rock
- Label: Universal Music Sweden

Jonathan Fagerlund singles chronology
"Angeline" (2007)	"Playing Me" (2008)	"Dance in The Shadows" (2008)

Music video
- "Playing Me" on YouTube

"Playing Me" is a 2008 single from Swedish singer Jonathan Fagerlund taken from his debut album Flying and being the follow-up single to "Angeline".

The single made it to number 4 on Sverigetopplistan, the official Swedish Singles Chart for two consecutive weeks and stayed for a total of 7 weeks on the chart. It also reached second position at Digilistan.

== Charts ==
Chart (2008)	Peak position
Sweden (Sverigetopplistan)	4
