= Jonathan Fagerlund =

Swedish singer

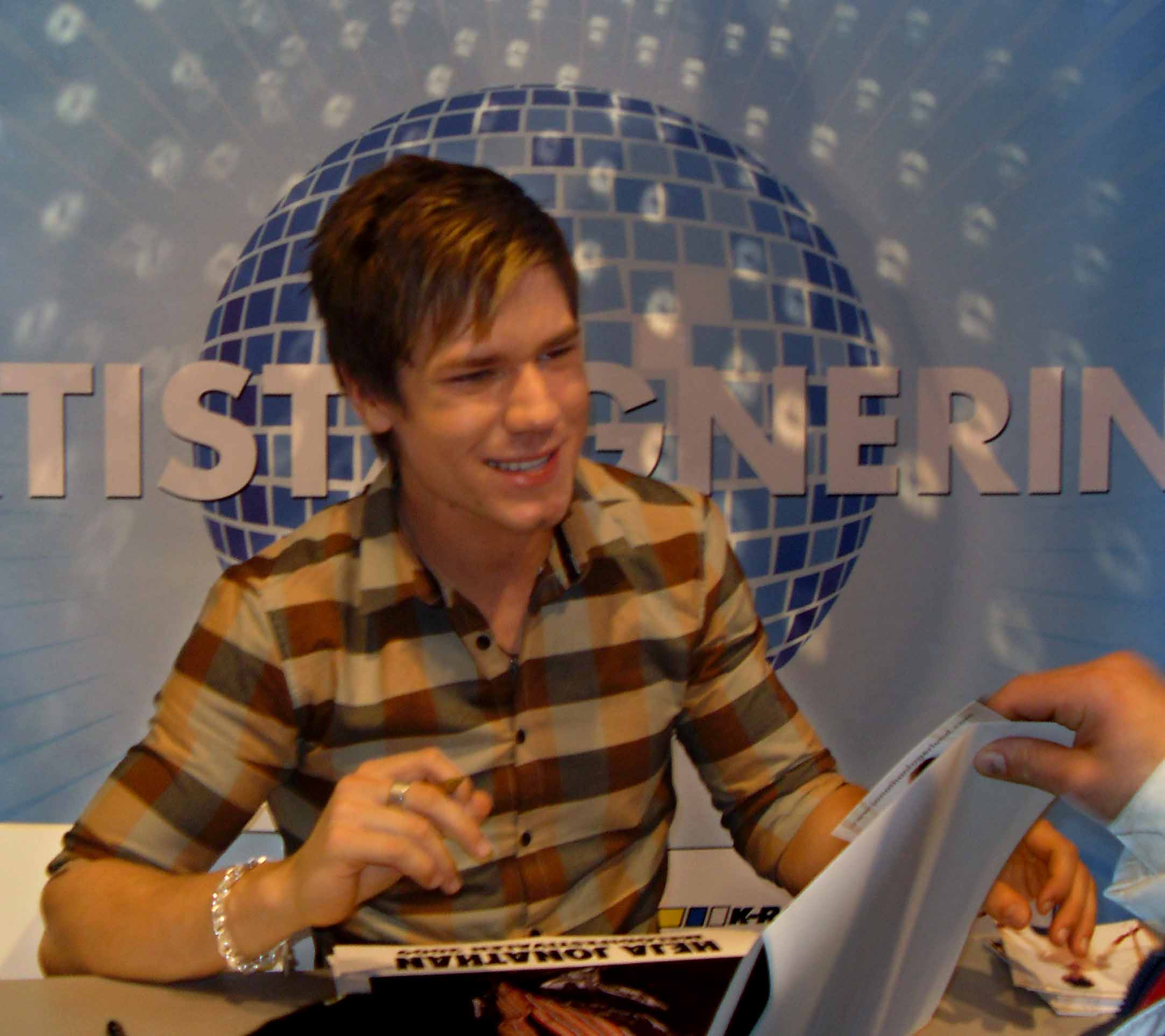

Background information
- Also known as: Jonathan
- Born: Jonathan Fagerlund; 8 January 1991 (age 35)
- Origin: Jönköping, Sweden
- Genres: Pop
- Occupations: Singer, songwriter, musician
- Instruments: Vocals, guitar
- Years active: 2004 – present
- Website: Official Site

Jonathan Fagerlund (born 8 January 1991), sometimes just Jonathan, is a Swedish singer. He has released two albums Flying and Welcome to My World and five singles. He is signed to Dreamline Music record label. In 2009, he took part in Melodifestivalen with the song "Welcome to My Life". Before his solo career, he had taken part in a television series and was, for a brief time, a member of Streetwize, an international boy band project. In the 2010s he developed a fitness training career under the name By Jonny.

== Career ==
Fagerlund was born in Jönköping. In 2004, at the age of 13, he took part in Super Troupers on Sweden's TV4 television station. He finished fifth overall out of 10 finalists with the song "This is the Moment / Nu eller aldrig"

In 2005, he joined the international boy band project called Streetwize, alongside Lee Mulhern (later known as Lee Matthews), Donal Skehan and Lee Hutton. He toured with the group in the United Kingdom, Ireland, United States and Sweden. The original members appeared on the US television station CN8, a cable television station where they performed "Room in Your Heart" in a morning show hosted by Greg Coy. But disappointed by the slow progress of the group project, he decided to leave the band Streetwize and return to his homeland and start a solo musical career.

He released his debut album, Flying, in 2008 with collaborations from producers and songwriters Samuel Waermö, Andreas Carlsson and Savan Kotecha. His first ever official single was "Angeline". It had heavy air play on Swedish pop radio stations, but failed to chart. The next single released in Sweden, "Playing Me", released in February 2008 and topped at No. 4 for two consecutive weeks in the Swedish Singles Chart in March 2008. A third single followed in 2008 "Dance in the Shadows". Jonathan went on tour with Nickelodeon for their highly popular summer music festival.

Jonathan also took part in the 2009 series of Melodifestivalen with the new song "Welcome to My Life" written by Samuel Waermö and Didrik Thott Jonathan in a bid to represent Sweden in the Eurovision Song Contest 2009 held in Moscow, Russia. The Swedish contest was won by the soprano Malena Ernman. In his second album Welcome to My World, he collaborated with Alice Svensson, a childhood friend and Idol 2008 runner-up in the song "Save Our Yesterdays".

== By Jonny ==
In 2010s, Fagerlund started working as a training instructor in a fitness gym in Stockholm. He is a fitness trainer and nutritionist who developed his program under the name By Jonny. He won "Group Fitness Trainer of the Year" and was nominated to "Personal Trainer of the Year" at Fitnessfestivalen.

== Discography ==
=== Albums ===
Year	Album	Peak positions
Year	Album	SWE
2008	Flying	–
2009	Welcome to My World	53

=== Singles ===
Year	Single	Peak positions	Album
Year	Single	SWE	Album
2007	"Angeline"	–	Flying
2008	"Playing Me"	4	Flying
2008	"Dance in the Shadows"	–	Flying
2009	"Welcome to My Life"	23	Welcome to My Life

=== Songs / Videos ===
- 2007: "Angeline"
- 2008: "Playing Me"
- 2008: "Dance in the Shadows"
- 2009: "Welcome to My Life"
- 2009: "Ready 4 It"
- 2012: "U-DO"
