= Burn (Industry song) =

Single by Industry
- Released: August 2009
- Recorded: 2009
- Genre: Pop
- Length: 3:49
- Label: MIG Live

Industry singles chronology
"My Baby's Waiting" (2009)	"Burn" (2009)	"In Your Arms" (2009)

Music video
- "Burn" on YouTube

"Burn" is a song by Irish pop group Industry, the follow-up single to the debut chart-topper "My Baby's Waiting". "Burn" also reached number one on the Irish Singles Chart on 27 August 2009, staying at the top for one week, thus cutting the six week long streak of the Black Eyed Peas' "I Gotta Feeling" at the top of the Irish chart. "I Gotta Feeling" then regained the top position on the chart after the one week by Industry.

"Burn" spent a total of just two weeks on the Irish Singles Chart.

== Charts ==
Chart (2009)	Peak position
Ireland (IRMA)	1

== See also ==
- List of number-one singles of 2009 (Ireland)
