= My Baby's Waiting =

Irish 2009 number 1 hit single

Single by Industry
- Released: June 2009
- Recorded: 2009
- Genre: Pop
- Length: 3:32
- Label: MIG Live

Industry singles chronology
"My Baby's Waiting" (2009)	"Burn" (2009)

Music video
- "My Baby's Waiting" on YouTube

My Baby's Waiting is the debut single of the Irish boy/girl band Industry. It was #1 in the Irish Singles Chart for the chart of 25 June 2009. It was in the Irish charts for two weeks.

== Charts ==
Chart (2009)	Chart peak
Irish Singles Chart	1
