= List of one-hit wonders on the UK Albums Chart =

The UK Albums Chart is a weekly record chart based on album sales from Sunday to Saturday in the United Kingdom. It listed only physical album sales until 2007, after which it also included albums sold digitally and streams (the latter included in 2015). The chart is currently compiled by the Official Charts Company (OCC) on behalf of the UK music industry, and each week's new number one is first announced by BBC Radio 1 on their weekly chart show.

The definition of a "one-hit wonder", as given by the reference text The Guinness Book of British Hit Albums, was any act that achieves a number one on the UK Album Chart and no other Top 40 entry. However, when Guinness first published the list in the 1980s the hit albums chart was a Top 100 with compilations included, until being split at the end of 1989 into a Top 75 Hit/Official Albums Chart and Top 20 Hit/Official Compilations Chart, with a Top 200 artist albums chart being available to industry insiders from the 1990s. One hit wonders on the Singles Chart are artists with their number one being also their only Top 75 entry. Since the album chart was first published on 28 July 1956, 15 acts have reached number one and had no other hit albums (Top 75 entries). Artists who have topped the album chart as solo artists but also charted as members of groups are exempted from the main list as well as those with smaller hits (listed separately).

== One-hit wonders ==
Artist	Album	Record label	Reached number one (for the week ending)	Weeks at number one	Notes	Ref.
Freddy Cannon	The Explosive Freddy Cannon	Top Rank	12 March 1960	1	The first number one album on the Record Retailer chart	
Blind Faith	Blind Faith	Polydor	20 September 1969	2	Although the band Blind Faith had one number-one album and nothing else, each member of the supergroup (including Steve Winwood and Eric Clapton) had further album chart success.	
Johnny Hates Jazz	Turn Back the Clock	Virgin	23 January 1988	1	Follow-up album Tall Stories (with The Cure's Phil Thornalley on vocals) failed to make the Top 75, while a couple of reunion albums in the 21st Century also failed to reach the chart.	
The Farm	Spartacus	Produce	16 March 1991	1	The band issued three follow-up albums, each which failed to make the Official Top 75, though their 2025 album Let The Music (Take Control) sold enough copies to chart at number 10 on the Official Albums Sales Chart on 3 July 2025.	
Chaka Demus & Pliers	Tease Me	Mango	29 January 1994	2	Had originally peaked at number 26 in July 1993, before being re-released and topping the chart in January 1994.	
Steve Brookstein	Heart and Soul	Syco	21 May 2005	1	Winner of the 2004 series of The X Factor. Follow-up album 40,000 Things failed to make the Top 75	
Ray Quinn	Doing It My Way	Syco	24 March 2007	1	Runner-up in the 2006 series of The X Factor Follow-up album Undeniable failed to chart.	
The Commonwealth Band	Sing	Decca	9 June 2012	3	Co-credit with Gary Barlow	
Pnau	Good Morning to the Night	Mercury	28 July 2012	1	Co-credit with Elton John. Pnau have had charting albums in their native country Australia, band member Nick Littlemore has had three albums chart on the UK Album Top 100 with Empire of the Sun	
Conor Maynard	Contrast	Parlophone	11 August 2012	1	Follow-up album Covers failed to make the Top 75.	
Jahméne Douglas	Love Never Fails	RCA	3 August 2013	1	Runner-up in the 2012 series of The X Factor. Follow-up album Unfathomable Phantasmagoria failed to make the Top 75.	
Viola Beach	Viola Beach	Fuller Beans	11 August 2016	1	The band's only album was released posthumously, all of the band members having died in a road accident earlier in the year.	
Boygenius	The Record	Interscope	7 April 2023	1	Boygenius is an indie supergroup with the act collectively having two Top 75 album chart hits to their name before releasing The Record. Out of the three members, Phoebe Bridgers has had the most success in the UK chart as a solo artist with Punisher, her second studio album, getting to number 6 in July 2020, while Julien Baker's third album Little Oblivions peaked at number 51 in March 2021. In addition to these solo Top 75 hits, Home Video by the band's third member Lucy Dacus managed a number 85 chart position on the Top 100 in July 2021, but has no solo hits to her name, whether on the singles or albums chart. In addition, The Record also debuted at number one on the Official Charts Company's Irish Albums Chart Top 50, making them a one hit wonder in Ireland as well.	
Ren	Sick Boi	The Other Songs	26 October 2023	1	This album was placed at number two in the midweek charts with Rick Astley's Are We There Yet? being the number one album for most of the week. As Ren Gill was only 133 sales behind Astley when the update was issued on Wednesday, it was decided that a £4.99 digital version of his album would go on sale on his website on the Thursday, securing 4,533 more sales on the last day of tracking and the number one spot when the Official Albums Chart was released on 20 October 2023.	
Chappell Roan	The Rise and Fall of a Midwest Princess	Island	15 August 2024	2	This album reached number one, 46 weeks after being released thanks to the release of the Popstar (Clear Coke Bottle) edition, which added 8,591 double vinyl album sales to the weekly total. The album features the Top 40 singles "Hot to Go!" and "Red Wine Supernova" which were at number 15 and number 32 at the time, but not the Top 3 hit "Good Luck, Babe!".	

== Artists with a number one album and a smaller Top 75 hit ==
The Guinness Book of British Hit Albums was first issued in 1983, six years before the Top 75 albums chart hit definition came into being (with a full Top 150 Artist Albums Chart being published for people within the industry at this time). As of January 2022, the OCC still track the number of Top 75 album hits on their website, but make available a Top 100 countdown to the public. The following list includes artists with more than one album chart hit who would have been seen as a one-hit wonder under the Guinness definition of 1983.

- Neil Reid reached number one for three weeks on 19 February 1972 with his self-titled debut album on Decca, after winning the 1971 series of Opportunity Knocks. He was the youngest person ever to top the album chart but success was short lived as follow-up album Smile peaked at number 47 in September 1972.
- Holly Johnson's solo album Blast was number one on the 5 May 1989, with his second solo hit Europa reaching number 63, more than 25 years later. Johnson was the lead singer of Frankie Goes to Hollywood, who also managed to have a number one hit, which also excludes him from the main artists list.
- Journey South hit number one on the albums chart on 1 April 2006 with their self-titled debut album (Syco Music) after coming third in the 2005 series of The X Factor. Follow-up album Home peaked at number 43 in November 2007.

== Number one albums: One-week wonders ==
When The Guinness Book of British Hit Albums was last published in the 1990s, the list of 'number one albums with the fewest weeks on the chart' was based on the Top 75, with the shortest chart stay for a number one album being 5 weeks with acts such as Little Angels (with their 1993 album Jam), topping the list. In 2021, a never-to-be-beaten record was set with a number of albums debuting at the top and exiting the Top 75 the next week. In 2023, The Lottery Winners became the first artist to have a number one album go from number one to outside the top 200.

The following is an update to the original 'number one albums with the fewest weeks on the chart' list but only lists those number one hit albums with one week in the Top 75 (as per The Guinness Book of British Hit Albums data):

- One-week in the Top 75 and Top 100 charts:
  - You Me At Six - Suckapunch: reached the top on 28 January 2021, the following week the album dropped out of the Top 100.
  - Ben Howard - Collections from the Whiteout: reached the top on 8 April 2021, the following week the album dropped out of the Top 100.
  - Enter Shikari - A Kiss for the Whole World: reached the top on 4 May 2023, the following week A Kiss for the Whole World became the first album to drop out of the Top 120 on its second week ending up at number 126.
  - The Lottery Winners - Anxiety Replacement Therapy: reached the top on 11 May 2023, the following week the album dropped out of the Top 200, breaking Enter Shikari's record for the biggest second week drop from the top spot by selling 880 copies on its second week, meaning that it was unplaced in the UK chart.
  - Shed Seven - Liquid Gold reached the top on 10 October 2024, the following week this re-recorded greatest hits album slumped from number one to number 111 with sales of 1,707 copies.
  - Those Damn Crows - God Shaped Hole: reached the top on 24 April 2025, the following week the album dropped out to number 121 with sales of 1,539. This number was the first chart topper for Earache Records and the first album to be released on the KiT format to be included in the UK album charts.
  - The K's - Pretty on the Internet: reached the top on 7 August 2025, with first week sales of 25,032 units, the following week the album dropped out of the Top 100 after selling 1,027 units.
  - Aerosmith & YUNGBLUD - One More Time: reached the top on 4 December 2025, the following week this five-track EP slumped to number 151 after selling a further 1,611 copies in the UK.
  - Skindred - You Got This: reached the top on 30 April 2026, the following week the album dropped out of the Top 100.
  - Niall Horan - Dinner Party: reached the top on 18 June 2026, the following week the album dropped out of the Top 100.
  - The Reytons - A Love Letter to a Broken Town: reached the top on 14 August 2026, the following week the album dropped out of the Top 100.
  - Kasabian - Act III: reached the top on 11 September 2026, the following week the album dropped out of the Top 100.
- One-week in the Top 75 but stayed for another week in the Top 100 (still eligible for The Guinness Book of British Hit Albums list):
  - The Wombats - Fix Yourself, Not the World (reached the top on 27 January 2022) The following week this album had dropped out of the Top 75 and was at number 96, and so would be still eligible for The Guinness Book of British Hit Albums list.
  - Ellie Goulding - Higher Than Heaven (reached the top on 20 April 2023) The following week this album had dropped out of the Top 75 and was at number 84, and so would be still eligible for The Guinness Book of British Hit Albums list.
  - Royal Blood - Back to the Water Below (reached the top on 14 September 2023) The following week this album had dropped out of the Top 75 and was at number 94, and so would be still eligible for The Guinness Book of British Hit Albums list.
  - The Libertines - All Quiet on the Eastern Esplanade (reached the top on 18 April 2024) The following week this album had dropped out of the Top 75 and was at number 93, and so would be still eligible for The Guinness Book of British Hit Albums list.
  - Stereophonics - Make 'Em Laugh, Make 'Em Cry, Make 'Em Wait (reached the top on 8 May 2025) The following week this album had dropped out of the Top 75 and was at number 87 with sales of 1,942, and so would be still eligible for The Guinness Book of British Hit Albums list.
  - Tom Grennan - Everywhere I Went, Led Me to Where I Didn't Want to Be (reached the top on 23 August 2025) The following week this album had dropped out of the Top 75 and was at number 95, and so would be still eligible for The Guinness Book of British Hit Albums list.
  - Louis Tomlinson - How Did I Get Here? (reached the top on 30 January 2026). The following week this album had dropped out of the Top 75 and was at number 85, and so would be still eligible for The Guinness Book of British Hit Albums list.
  - Ezra Collective - Here Because Of Hope (reached the top on 24 September 2026). The following week this album had dropped out of the Top 75 and was at number 82, and so would be still eligible for The Guinness Book of British Hit Albums list.

== See also ==
- List of one-hit wonders on the UK singles chart
- Lists of one-hit wonders
