= Controversy and criticism of The X Factor (British TV series) =

Criticisms and controversies of The X Factor

The X Factor in the UK has been subject to much controversy and criticism since its launch in 2004. This has included allegations of conflict of interest, voting irregularities and overcharging, product placement for sponsors, staging scenes, use of pitch correction technology, and exploiting vulnerable contestants. The series has also been criticised for developing singers as marketable products rather than creative individuals. As of April 2020, there have been fifteen completed series broadcast on the ITV network, as well as spin-offs The X Factor: Celebrity (2019) and The X Factor: The Band (2019).

== Judges and presenters ==
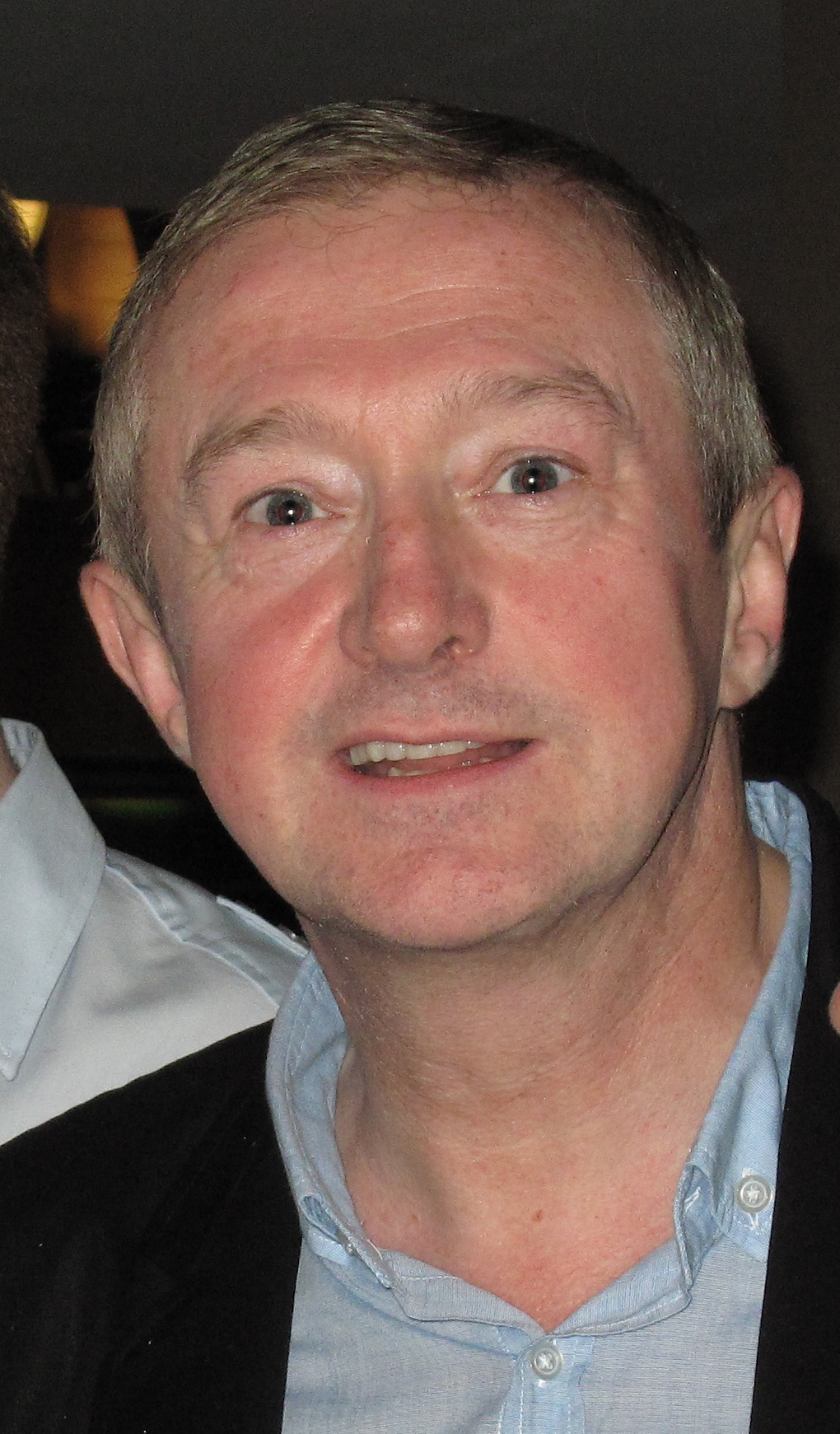
Louis Walsh was accused of helping contestants he had personal connections with in both the first and second series.

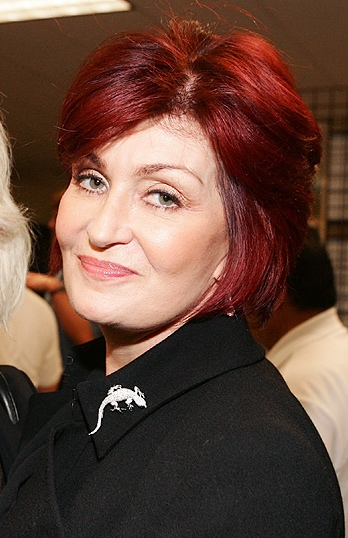
Sharon Osbourne was accused of voting against Simon Cowell's contestants in a pact with Walsh.

It was reported in tabloid newspapers that the show's audition process was unfair after judge Louis Walsh was accused of cheating. Walsh was thought to have advised group Co-Ed on things such as song choices, which caused controversy after it was revealed that Walsh had previously managed the band after they appeared on the Irish version of Popstars in 2001. Around the same time, footage of Simon Cowell and Sharon Osbourne coaching contestants to argue back to the judges was being sold to the highest bidder.

Prior to the first live show, Cowell was accused by Osbourne of "rigging" the show by editing footage to make his contestants more appealing to viewers. In December 2004, Osbourne made an apology after attracting what Cowell referred to as "record complaints" over an outburst in which she criticised eventual winner Steve Brookstein. This left her place on the show uncertain.

During the live stages of the second series, Osbourne and Walsh were accused of having a pact against Cowell, that resulted in them unfairly eliminating his contestants against their own. Further controversy was created when Walsh cast the deciding vote to keep Irish group The Conway Sisters in the show at the expense of Maria Lawson. The controversy heightened when it was revealed that he had worked with The Conway Sisters prior to them entering the show.

On one occasion, Walsh announced after the live Saturday show that he would quit the series, claiming that the other two judges had been "bullying" him. In addition to various verbal assaults on Walsh, Osbourne had thrown water over him live on air. Walsh's announcement was claimed by many to be a publicity stunt after he decided to return to the show the following Saturday night.

Prior to the commencement of series four, The Xtra Factor host Ben Shephard left his post after reportedly being unhappy about not being given the presenting role on the main show, which instead went to Dermot O'Leary following the departure of original host Kate Thornton.

During a live broadcast in series five, judge Dannii Minogue broke down in tears after Walsh accused her of "stealing" the song "Rule the World" that he had wanted for JLS. The song choice selection process took place off camera and was done on a rota system, which alternated first priority when requesting songs. Cowell defended Minogue and convinced Walsh to apologise. Later on the ITV2 broadcast of The Xtra Factor, Cowell once again defended Minogue's actions, commenting "Dannii did exactly what I would do, which is choose the right song for the artist and if Louis doesn't like it, tough!"

During the first live show of sixth series, Minogue caused controversy after commenting on press reports. These comments outed contestant Danyl Johnson's sexuality as bisexual. This caused an online backlash. She subsequently apologised, which was accepted by Johnson. During the same series, Cowell was criticised for allegedly pressuring fellow judge Cheryl Cole to cast her elimination vote against contestant Lucie Jones who he could then save. Jones, widely considered the better singer, was subsequently eliminated from the competition by viewer poll. Dannii Minogue later said "This is a singing competition ... and this shouldn't have happened".

During week five of the seventh series, two of Cheryl's acts, Katie Waissel and Treyc Cohen, were in the bottom two. According to the rules of the competition each judge must independently vote to eliminate one of the contestants. However, Cheryl refused to vote against either of them, causing presenter Dermot O'Leary to remind her of her duty as a judge. Cohen was eventually sent home on a majority vote of the remaining three judges.

== Contestants ==
During series 3, boy band Avenue were accused of cheating after it emerged that they already had a management deal with music mogul Ashley Tabor-King, who reportedly sought to use the show for publicity. It was also revealed that one member, Jamie Tinker, previously had a recording contract with a branch of Sony Music Entertainment, of which Cowell's company Syco is a subsidiary. Despite attracting criticism, this was judged not to be against the rules of the show. The band insisted that they were not cheats.

During series 4, the producers discovered that Sisi Jghalef, a member of girl group Hope, had a criminal conviction. Having an unspent criminal conviction is in contravention of the show's rules, and Jghalef was asked to leave the competition. Hope, who had already been selected as finalists, continued without her.

During the live stages, 15-year-old contestant Emily Nakanda was discovered in a "happy slapping" video, in which she apparently attacked another girl. Both her mentor, Sharon Osbourne, and her family were said to be upset with her behaviour. Nakanda chose to withdraw from the competition of her own accord rather than being asked to do so by producers.

The lowering of the minimum contestant age from 16 to 14 for series 4 attracted criticism from some quarters. Groups such as the Family and Parenting Institute expressed concern that children of this age might be not be sufficiently emotionally robust to cope with the experience. The minimum age was returned to 16 for series six and again lowered to 14 for series eleven.

After the second audition episode of series 5 had been broadcast, Cowell publicly stated his intention to make changes to the show by reducing the emphasis on contestants' "sob stories", conceding that they had been "out of hand" in the previous series and viewers were "starting not to believe them".

Contestant Alan Turner was criticised in the press for allegedly lying to the judges in his original audition. Turner had told the panel that he had been fostered and sexually abused since the age of four and did not know his real parents, but his father and uncle publicly disputed the claims. Producers vowed to support Turner, who had been put through to boot camp, insisting that his place on the show was "never in jeopardy". Turner claimed that the show's editing had made him appear dishonest, but his mother later claimed that her son had made false claims which had "hurt [her] beyond belief". In one episode, Cowell confronted Turner over the truth of his story, and was satisfied that it was true. Ultimately, however, Turner was eliminated at the final stage before the live shows.

Series 7 auditionee Shirlena Johnson was removed from the competition after the boot-camp stage over concerns about her mental health. In Johnson's first audition, she performed "Mercy" by Duffy, but she performed it so incoherently that the song became almost unrecognizable. The producers stated that they had had only received information about her mental health on 23 August, but Johnson's mother stated that they already knew about her medical history. A spokesperson for the show said "the welfare of contestants is of paramount importance, and for this reason, it has been agreed that Shirlena Johnson should not continue in the competition."

Zimbabwean singer Gamu Nhengu progressed to the judges' houses stage under Cheryl's mentorship. Viewers expressed anger when Cheryl did not pick Nhengu for the live shows, despite a well received performance. Instead, Katie Waissel and Cher Lloyd were chosen, despite both being unable to finish their performances. Cheryl defended her decision as a "gut instinct" that she thought was best. Waissel's inclusion in the show was further surrounded by controversy as it was revealed that she already had a recording contract in the United States prior to auditioning.

In series 8, contestant Ceri Rees was reportedly persuaded to return to the show by the producers. Several well-known celebrities condemned the show for broadcasting her audition. Mind, a charity that aids people with mental health issues, publicly condemned the decision with a spokesperson saying "We want people with mental health problems to participate, but need program-makers to be responsible".

During the live shows, Frankie Cocozza was asked to leave the competition before the sixth live show, for boasting about using cocaine. The rules of the series strictly prohibit drug use during the show. As a result Amelia Lily, who was eliminated in the first live show, was reinstated through a public vote on the sixth live show.

Midway through the series, girl group Rhythmix were forced to change their name after an attempt by Cowell to trademark the name came to the attention of the music charity organisation Rhythmix. The charity's chief executive, Mark Davyd, wrote an open letter to Cowell telling him to "just change the name". Following public pressure from the charity, the group agreed to change their name to Little Mix, and later won the series.

In series 9, Christopher Maloney received much criticism. He was eliminated at the judges' houses but returned to the competition in a wildcard vote and subsequently received the most public votes for several weeks. Newspapers reported that this was an apparent effort by viewers to destroy the show's credibility beyond repair. Maloney was regularly attacked verbally by the judges, who did not see him having the superstar quality to justify his place in the competition. Maloney reached the finals but polled the lowest number of votes at the first stage and finished in third place. The following day, reports surfaced that he was kept from performing that night's final group song after reportedly turning up late for rehearsals, having drunk alcohol the previous night and was still smelling of it, and allegedly used misogynistic language toward another contestant.

Series 10 contestant Lydia Lucy criticised the new boot-camp format that was introduced in this series, in which successful contestants were at risk of losing their place if another contestant was deemed to have performed better. Lucy was one of three contestants who lost the support of her mentoring judge Nicole Scherzinger in favour of another contestant in this challenge. She said: "I've been absolutely devastated ... [this] is like dangling a carrot in front of someone and then taking it away."

Scherzinger was criticised for eliminating returning contestants Jade Richards and Melanie McCabe at the judges' houses stage and bringing Tamera Foster and Abi Alton to the live shows instead. McCabe's exit was met with outrage on Twitter, as she had been considered one of the favorites to win the series. In interviews given shortly before judges' houses was screened, both contestants had vowed never to return again if they were rejected.

In June 2020, series 8 semi-finalist Misha B took to social media to open up about accounts of racism she experienced on the show. She stated: "They [The X Factor producers] saw an opportunity to tear down a black girl that came from a broken home and worked together to assassinate my character and to sabotage my career by orchestrating lies", and added that she was suicidal and was diagnosed with PTSD during and after the competition. She cited judges Tulisa and Louis Walsh were making remarks on live television about Misha B being a bully in the third week of the live shows. Walsh later issued an apology on the third live result show for his remarks by saying "I got a bit carried away and I know I shouldn't have used the word 'bully' to Misha [B], and I apologise for that ... I'm sorry. I'm sorry.". She also accused the show's producers of having a "corrupted agenda". Despite her claims, Misha B was not trying "... to shame anybody.". This appeared to prove that allegations made two years earlier by former judge Gary Barlow were true. In his autobiography, A Better Me (2018), Barlow wrote: "About half an hour before the show goes live, the producers would come in and they'd go 'Oh my god. That Misha. She's such a bully. Can’t believe it. She is such a bully. In fact, you know what? You should say it. You should say it on air. She's just bullied everyone all week'." Tulisa responded to Misha's claims, saying that she regrets calling her out in a public way and apologised, but commented that "to say and make claims that it was racially motivated is ludicrous", and added that "There had been an accumulation of things that Misha [B] had done to other contestants and my contestants backstage. She had made two of my acts cry, one of them being on the night that I made those comments.".

In July 2020, series 9 auditioner and Pink tribute artist Zoe Alexander came forward with her account of mistreatment and misrepresentation during the audition process. Alexander alleges that the production encouraged situations whereby the contestants faced discomfort (such as long wait times and limited access to water) to evoke more emotional response from contestants during the judging process. Alexander also alleges that the production requested that she sing the Pink song "So What" and that the focus of her audition was on her being a Pink tribute artist rather than as a singer in her own right. When criticised for her song choice, Alexander replied, "You told me to sing a Pink song" before exiting the stage visibly distraught. During her emotional breakdown backstage, Alexander allegedly assaulted one of the show's producers. A formal complaint was made and Alexander was let off with a police caution after admitting assault. Once the audition aired, Alexander became a target of negative publicity and made a complaint to Ofcom claiming that the footage had been heavily edited to portray her in an unfavorable light and that she had been set up as a source of ridicule. After viewing the original unedited footage, Ofcom rejected all of her claims.

== Auditions ==
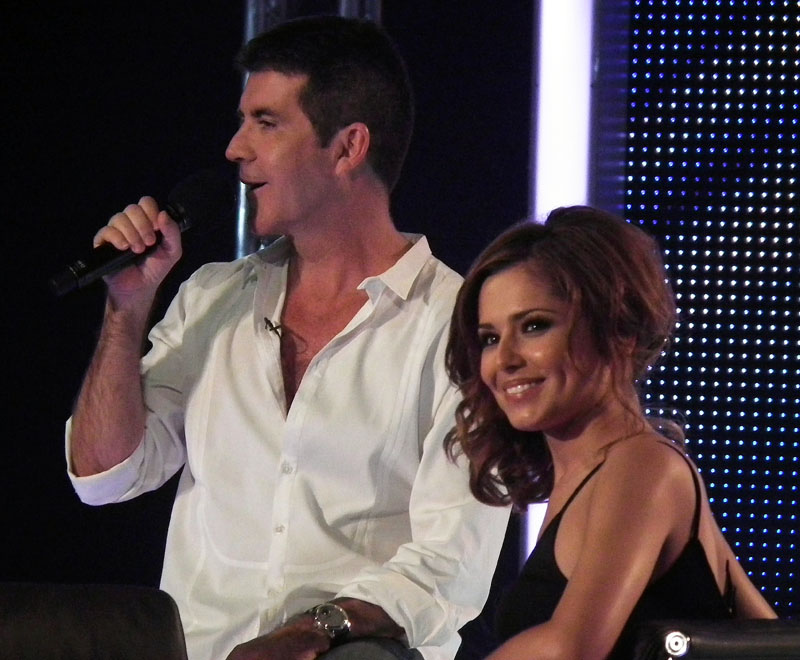
Simon Cowell and Cheryl filming the auditions for series seven, where voice manipulating technology was used.

There is anecdotal evidence from blogs and discussion forums that some of the first-round X Factor audition sessions held in front of the producers have been poorly organised, with auditioners being forced to wait for many hours outside in the cold with few facilities and little information about when they will be seen. Attendees have also complained about queue-jumping, exorbitantly priced refreshments, the very short period of audition time permitted, and the fact that selection decisions are left in the hands of unqualified production staff. It has been alleged that some of the "open" audition events are simply an opportunity for producers to get shots of large crowds, rather than a serious attempt to find talented contestants. Auditionees are reprimanded by production staff if they complain or fail to participate in such shots. The production team also supply the "home-made" signs ('I have the X Factor', etc.) that the contestants brandish.

According to the Daily Mirror and several other newspapers, the auditions for series seven have involved the use of pitch correction to make some singers sound "better" than they actually were. ITV did admit to doing this, but claimed that it was done in post-production and that the contestants did not know that their voices had been altered. This came about after viewers noticed the difference in singing by Gamu Nhengu in her audition.

== Accusations of staging ==
Rhydian Roberts complained he was "stitched up" by unfair editing.

There have been suggestions that much of the controversy surrounding the show, such as the bickering between the judges, is deliberately orchestrated to attract publicity, and that some supposedly "spontaneous" scenes are rehearsed or reran. Series one runners-up G4 branded The X Factor as a pantomime due to staged conflict between the judges which overshadowed the contestants' performances.

During the first live results show of the ninth series, executive producer Richard Holloway was accused of interfering with the judging process after he was seen speaking to Walsh during Carolynne Poole's final showdown performance. Walsh appeared to struggle with the decision, at first declaring that he wanted to save Poole, but when pressed by presenter Dermot O'Leary to name who he wanted to eliminate, he then said he wanted to send the result to deadlock by voting to eliminate Poole, which resulted in boos from the studio audience and anger expressed by online viewers. Former contestant Frankie Cocozza criticised the show on Twitter, writing that "The X Factor just showed the whole country how set up it is, not that we didn't know that anyway. The producers fucked it."

== Voting irregularities ==
In October 2007 (series four), it emerged that "serious technical issues" had resulted in viewer votes being ignored in the series four final, though it was found that the problems did not "alter the actual outcome" of the vote. ITV put in place a scheme which allowed affected consumers to be offered refunds.

After series three, it was discovered that ITV had overcharged viewers who voted via interactive television by a total of approximately £200,000. ITV said a data inputting error was to blame and that they would refund those affected on production of a telephone bill. They also indicated that they would make a £200,000 donation to Childline. This error, and those by other broadcasters, eventually led to a temporary suspension of all ITV's phone-in services on 5 March 2007 pending an audit and meeting with ICSTIS.

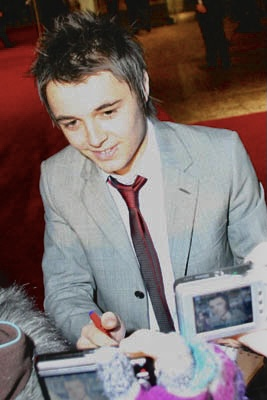
Over 1,100 people complained that there were irregularities with the voting in the final of series four, won by Leon Jackson, leading to a statement from ITV.

Following the result of the series four final, which was won by Leon Jackson, media watchdog Ofcom received a number of complaints from viewers who said that they were unable to register their vote for Rhydian Roberts, despite trying up to ten times. After complaints topped 1,100, ITV issued a statement which assured viewers that "Leon won The X Factor fair and square" and did so with a winning margin of 10%. A subsequent Ofcom investigation found that Roberts had not been unfairly disadvantaged and that 0.99% of viewers that called couldn't get through to vote for Roberts, compared to 1% for Jackson.

In week two of series five, fans of contestant Ruth Lorenzo complained that at one point during the live show an incorrect telephone number was displayed on screen, which may have influenced Lorenzo's ranking in the bottom two. ITV denied that the mistake affected the result when a spokesperson commented "During one short sequence, a single digit was missing from Ruth Lorenzo's vote number. The incorrect number was on screen for less than three seconds, and this was accompanied by an audio announcement giving the correct number. The error would not have changed the outcome of the vote."

Controversy about The X Factor voting arose again in the fifth week of the live stages following the elimination of Laura White. Thousands of viewers complained to Ofcom about a lack of transparency in the voting, saying that they could not get through to vote for White, or that their votes had been miscounted. ITV denied all allegations, stating that there were "absolutely no issues with the phone lines or the voting system".

== Impact on the music industry ==
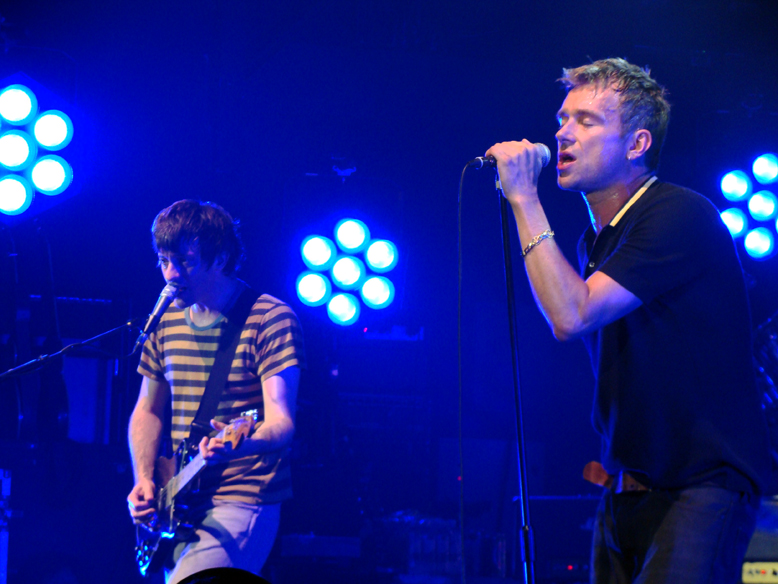
Blur members Graham Coxon (left) and Damon Albarn (2009 image) have both criticised the show.

The X Factor has been criticised for being a "soap opera" rather than a search for real talent. Musician Sting called the show "televised karaoke", with the contestants being encouraged to "conform to stereotypes", and saying that real musical talent is more likely to be found in pubs and clubs. Blur lead singer Damon Albarn also criticised the show for "creating a mindset that suggests you can get something for nothing and that it's easy to acquire status and fame", while Blur lead guitarist Graham Coxon similarly opined that "being a musician is not something you can become overnight", calling both The X Factor and rival show The Voice UK "disgraceful".

V V Brown criticised the show for misleading young singers about how the music industry works, claiming at the 2009 MOBO Awards "I don't like it – it's making kids think that they can get really famous easily, rather than working really hard to achieve something". Amy Macdonald criticised the show for making it more difficult for talented youngsters to break through.

American musician Moby claimed that although the show does produce good talent, it "cheapens" music, and criticised the show for telling the singers how to "sound" and "look". Charlotte Church shared a similar view and claimed that the show "doesn't have an interest in true craftsmanship or skill", whilst Elton John stated that "the only way to sustain a career is to pay your dues in small clubs".

Calvin Harris claimed that the show is a "joke" and that Cowell had a "frightening stranglehold" of the British charts, claiming that Cowell is "not really a music fan" and the show lacks creativity musically.

Noel Gallagher attacked the show for having "absolutely nothing to do with music and everything to do with television" and questioned the use of judges such as Minogue who, he suggested, "wouldn't know talent if it kicked [her]". However, in a 2011 interview on The Jonathan Ross Show, Gallagher stated that he watched the show and that "people take it too seriously about its effect on music." Kasabian frontman Tom Meighan also claimed his disbelief at how the judges can be taken seriously as music critics, considering Minogue has had few pop hits herself. He also expressed his disbelief at how popular the show was, claiming "The X Factor is like something the Riddler would do in Batman. It sucks out everyone's brains", and believed that the music produced from the show was "appalling".

Series five contestant Diana Vickers expressed that she was "glad [she] didn't win The X Factor", as she would not have had the freedom to write most of her album or appear in a theater show. She did not want to be signed to Cowell's label as she said she wanted to be "[her] own artist". She said that "the originality is stripped away from those who do make it. Between then and now, I've been given time to grow, do The Rise and Fall of Little Voice, which I'd never been able to do had I won."

La Roux singer Elly Jackson claimed that The X Factor had "ruined the music industry" and that the show overshadowed new artists who were writing their own material. Cowell responded to this particular criticism, arguing that the money made from the sales of The X Factor contestants music is then used to develop new artists.

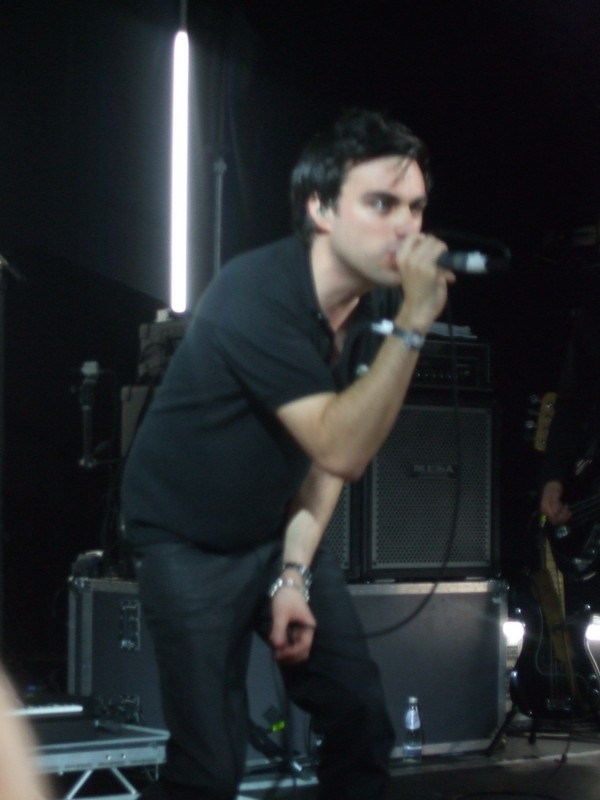
Hard-Fi lead singer Richard Archer was quoted as saying "The X Factor is on TV every week" when commenting on the release of his band's third studio album.

In August 2011, Hard-Fi frontman Richard Archer said that his band would struggle to compete with contestants from the eighth series (won by Little Mix) in the charts, when commenting on the release of the band's third studio album, Killer Sounds.

In 2012, MC Kinky said "shows like X Factor and Britain's Got Talent reduce the art of making music and practicing your craft to the level of a low rent game show with huge financial backing and support. It's a means to make money, not a means to produce ground breaking or interesting artists that demonstrate what they are feeling or are compelled to do. It's corporate."

Annie Lennox, lead singer of the Eurythmics, claimed that the "X Factor is a specific thing for people that want to go through that process”, referring to the X Factor as a sort of “factory” and it being “stitched up by puppet masters” ." Paul Weller, former frontman of the Jam, said that there would be no way he would ever appear as a mentor on shows like The X Factor. Pink Floyd guitarist/vocalist David Gilmour has also criticised the show, calling it "ghastly" and criticizing it for its lack of hard work and creativity. A similar opinion was shared by Suggs, frontman of Madness, who said that "The charts are being filled up with people who haven't really understood what it is to be an artist. It leaves less room for people who are trying to struggle their way around pubs and clubs and make it to the top in a more organic fashion."

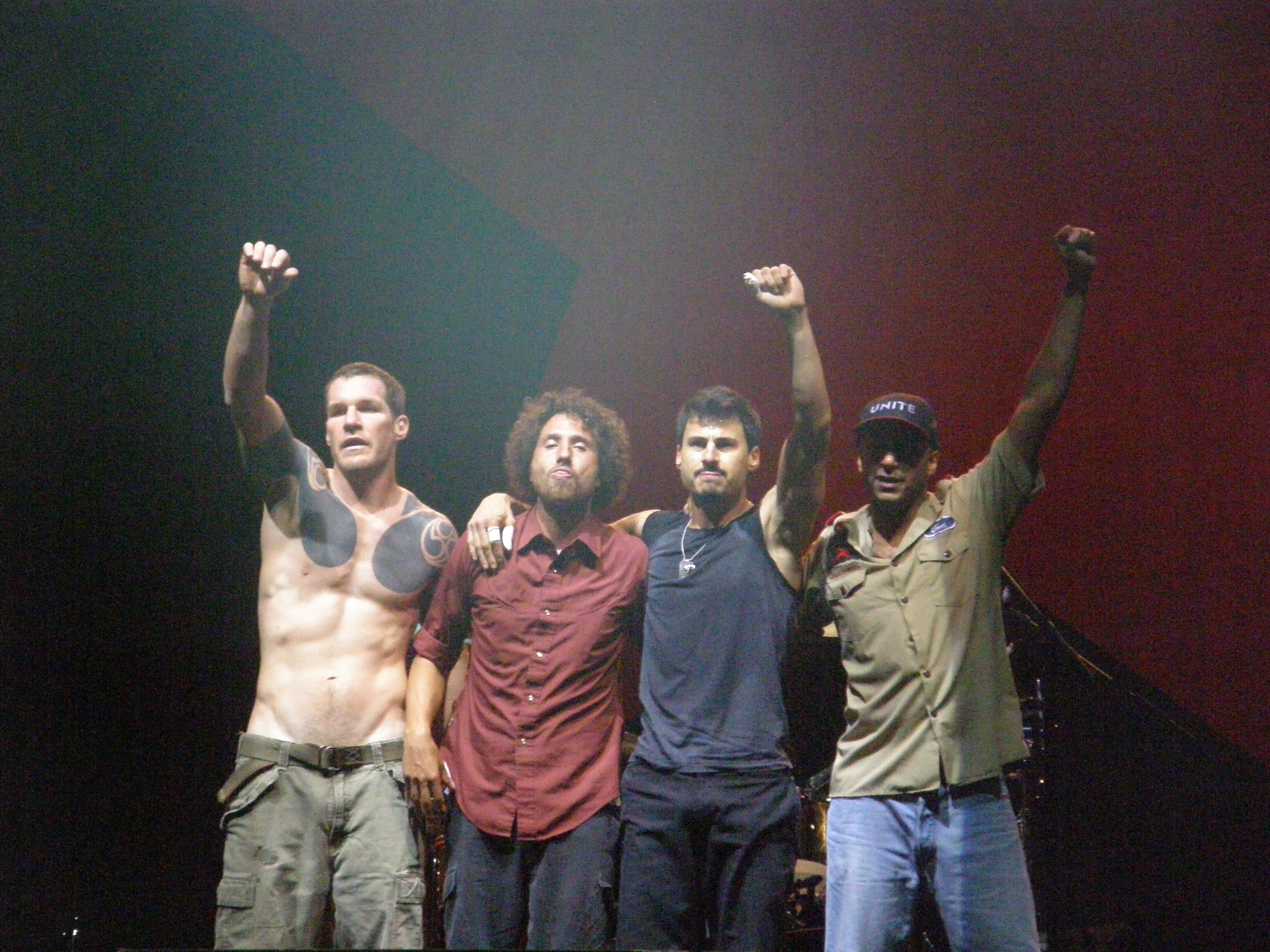
A protest against the show's impact on the music industry resulted in Rage Against the Machine claiming the 2009 Christmas number one in the UK

Before the UK Singles Chart started to include streaming data in its chart, another criticism of The X Factor is that the winner routinely achieves the number one spot in the UK Christmas singles charts, which, it is claimed, has taken the magic out of the event. In 2008, a campaign was launched to encourage people to buy Jeff Buckley's version of Leonard Cohen's song "Hallelujah" instead of 2008 X Factor winner Alexandra Burke's version; however Burke's version beat Buckley's version which charted at number two. A similar campaign was launched by Jon Morter on Facebook in December 2009, encouraging the public to buy Rage Against the Machine's 1992 song "Killing in the Name" to prevent the X Factor winner being the Christmas number one for the fifth year running. By 9 December (less than a week after launching) over 500,000 people had signed up, with much media interest. The campaign was ultimately successful with a winning margin of around 50,000 copies. The group performed a free concert in London as a thank you to all the fans. In 2011 and 2012, show winners Little Mix and James Arthur released their debut singles the week before Christmas, and achieved number one those weeks, with James Arthur also returning to number one the week after Christmas.

== Product placement ==
In series 3, media watchdog Ofcom upheld a complaint that The Xtra Factor had inappropriately featured close-up shots of the products of then sponsor Nokia. The complaint referred to an episode that showed the judges of the show jokingly sending insults to each other by text message, during the segment close up shots of Nokia products were clearly visible a total of thirteen times. A second complaint about the showing of a Motorola phone was not upheld.

In January 2013, Ofcom ruled that The X Factor had breached broadcasting rules by excessively plugging the hotel where the finalists stayed, saying it was mentioned in eight out of the 13 pre-recorded introduction videos for the finalists, including shots of them arriving featuring close-up shots of the hotel's sign. Ofcom found "the overall number of references to be excessive" and "therefore judged that there was insufficient editorial justification for the repeated references to the hotel during the program." They concluded that "the cumulative effect of these references resulted in the program as a whole giving undue prominence to the hotel."

== Trailers ==
On 30 July 2012, the trailer for the series premiered. Entitled "Whose Time Is Now?", it features six former The X Factor contestants – winners Lewis, Alexandra Burke and Little Mix, and runners-up JLS and Murs and third place One Direction – talking about their time on the show and how it changed their lives. However, male winners Steve Brookstein, Shayne Ward, Leon Jackson, Joe McElderry and Matt Cardle were not included. Ward blasted this, calling the show "pathetic" for leaving him out and saying it was like he was "being erased slowly from their history." McElderry, who won in 2009, said "I'm just gonna keep doing my thing", which many fans believed to be prompted by the trailer. McElderry later admitted that he was not angry about not being included in the trailer. In an interview with the Daily Star Sunday, he said: "I'm not on Simon [Cowell]'s label so I wouldn't expect him to promote me. If they want to erase the fact I won [The] X Factor or try to hide it, I don't care. Personally I am proud I came from The X Factor. If [Cowell] doesn't feel the same then you'll have to ask him why."

The mash-up video trailer promoting the tenth series was published as a "mash up of all the best a decade of X Factor has to offer" on 25 July 2013. The trailer consists of various music videos from 13 past contestants: One Direction, Leona Lewis, JLS, Olly Murs, Little Mix, Union J, Amelia Lily, Joe McElderry, Alexandra Burke, Cher Lloyd, Shayne Ward, Misha B and James Arthur. However, fans were questioning the exclusion of winners Steve Brookstein, Leon Jackson and Matt Cardle, and other successful contestants including Jedward, Diana Vickers and Rebecca Ferguson. Cardle's manager Will Talbot said that he believed the show was "attempting to erase Matt from the history books. [...] In truth, it pretty much sums up Syco's attitude to him during the months after he inconveniently (for them) won the show. Unfortunately there is a misconception that Matt has slagged off the show and fallen out with Sony but this is not true." Cardle later described being omitted from the advert as "disappointing, especially for fans who would have liked to have seen him in it. His collaborator and Spice Girls member Melanie C was more critical of ITV, commenting: "I think it's really fucking rude the way they have left him out."
