= Sleepwalking (Maria Lawson song) =

Single by Maria Lawson

from the album Maria Lawson
- B-side: "You're Beautiful"
- Released: 14 August 2006
- Genre: R&B
- Length: 3:59 (album version)
- Label: Sony BMG
- Songwriters: Andy McCluskey; A. Morris-Ord; B. Acklin; E. Record; L. Styles

Maria Lawson singles chronology
"Sleepwalking" (2006)	"Breaking Me Down" (2008)

Remixes cover art
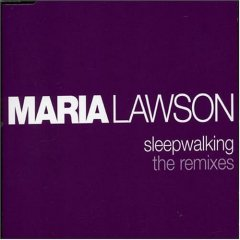

"Sleepwalking" is the debut single from The X Factor UK series 2 finalist, Maria Lawson.

OMD frontman Andy McCluskey was the song's principal writer. It features a sample of the Chi-Lites hit single "Have You Seen Her".

The track was released on 14 August 2006 and charted at number 20 on the UK Singles Chart. That same week, fellow series 2 finalist Chico also released a single. However, Lawson's track charted four places higher. "Sleepwalking" generally received positive criticism in the UK and was A-listed on BBC Radio 2. To date, the song has sold over 35,000 copies in the UK alone. The single was the first and only track to be lifted from Lawson's debut album Maria Lawson.

"Sleepwalking" also charted at number 44 in Ireland and at number 67 in Australia. The Australian release was released only as a download single. The single's B-side is a cover of James Blunt's "You're Beautiful".

== Charts ==
Chart	Peak position
UK Singles Chart	20
Irish Singles Chart	44
Australian Singles Chart	67
