= Maria Lawson (album) =

Studio album by Maria Lawson
- Released: 28 August 2006
- Length: 49:18
- Labels: Phonogenic; Sony BMG
- Producers: Def Jef; Simon Ellis; Andrew Frampton; The Heavyweights; Kevin Hughes; Pat Kelly; Steve Kipner; Andy McCluskey; Lester Mendez; Dave Thompson; Eg White; Wayne Wilkins; Nigel Wright

Maria Lawson chronology
Maria Lawson (2006)	Emotional Rollercoaster (2008)

Singles from Maria Lawson
- 1. "Sleepwalking" Released: 14 August 2006

Maria Lawson is the debut studio album from British X Factor contestant, Maria Lawson. It was released by Phonogenic Records and Sony BMG on 28 August 2006 in the United Kingdom. The album reached number 41 on the UK Albums Chart, selling 19,000 copies. It includes Maria Lawson's only single, "Sleepwalking" (co-written and produced by OMD's Andy McCluskey), as well as cover versions of Lamya's "Black Mona Lisa", Liberty X's "The Poet" and James Blunt's "You're Beautiful."

== Critical reception ==
Professional ratings
Review scores
Source	Rating
Orange	2/5 stars

BBC Music critic Tom Young called the album "a polished and credible first attempt, but one unlikely to figure in 2006 X Factor champion Leona Lewis’ list of influences. Without doubt, the smooth listening effort will draw comparisons with Gabrielle and Beverley Knight, but that isn’t exactly the fail safe stamp of approval at a time when Beyoncé Knowles and Gwen Stefani are the leading female yardsticks." Orange found that Lawson "has a strong, appealing voice, but she’s never going to be allowed to go out on a limb. She’ll be given safe and undemanding material, a reasonably modern R&B production, and that cover of "You're Beautiful" will be tacked on the end [...] There just isn’t the material or character to carry this off. Worse still, even amongst the pleasant stuff, there’s no bona fide hit single to give you hope for Maria’s future."

== Commercial performance ==
Maria Lawson debuted and peaked at number 41 on the UK Albums Chart in the week of 3 September 2006. It also reached number 14 on the UK R&B Albums Charts.

== Track listing ==
Maria Lawson track listing
No.	Title	Writer(s)	Producer(s)	Length
1.	"Sleepwalking"	Andy McCluskey; Barbara Acklin; Eugene Record; Anna Morris-Ord; Lucy Styles	McCluskey; Simon Ellis	3:59
2.	"Black Mona Lisa"	Lamya; Major; I. Dunn	Lester Mendez	4:01
3.	"Give All You Got"	Lawson; Andrew Frampton; Francis White	The Heavyweights; Eg White	3:14
4.	"The Poet"	Pam Sheyne; David Frank; Steve Kipner	The Heavyweights	4:46
5.	"Old School Lovin'"	Lawson; Jack Kugell; Jamie Jones; Jason Pennock	The Heavyweights	3:35
6.	"Your Life"	Frampton; John Davis; Kipner; Wayne Wilkins	Frampton; Kipner; Wilkins	3:30
7.	"Let It Break"	Lawson; Frampton; Kipner	Frampton; Kipner	3:04
8.	"His World"	J. Fortson; Kugell; Jones; Pennock; Jim Weatherly	The Heavyweights; Def Jef	3:26
9.	"Overrated"	Frampton; Kevin Hughes; Wilkins	Hughes; Wilkins	3:01
10.	"Naked with You"	Diane Warren	Ellis	3:31
11.	"Pretty Face"	Lawson; Kugell; Jones; Pennock	The Heavyweights	3:33
12.	"Woman's Intuition"	Lawson; Dave Thompson; Pat Kelly	Thompson; Kelly	3:05
13.	"It's Love"	Frampton	Frampton	3:59

Bonus track
No.	Title	Writer(s)	Producer(s)	Length
14.	"You're Beautiful"	James Blunt; Sacha Skarbek; Amanda Ghost	Nigel Wright	3:19
Total length:				49:11

Sample credits

- "Sleepwalking" includes a sample of the Chi-Lites song "Have You Seen Her"
- "His World" includes a sample from "Midnight Train to Georgia"

== Charts ==
Weekly chart performance for Maria Lawson
Chart (2006)	Peak position
UK Albums (Official Charts)	41
UK R&B Albums (Official Charts)	14
