= Christopher Maloney (English singer) =

English singer and musician

Chris Maloney
- Born: Christopher Michael Maloney; 26 December 1977 (age 48); Liverpool, England
- Genres: Pop, soul, gospel
- Occupation: Singer
- Instrument: Vocals
- Years active: 2012–present
- Label: Tristar

Christopher Michael Maloney is an English singer and musician from Liverpool, who was first seen as a contestant on The X Factor in 2012, which he been the last contestant eliminated.

== Career ==
=== 2012–13: The X Factor ===
In 2012, Maloney auditioned in Liverpool for the ninth series of The X Factor. He struggled with nerves, but managed to overcome them and sing Bette Midler's "The Rose". Afterwards, he received a standing ovation from the audience and judges Louis Walsh, Gary Barlow, Tulisa Contostavlos and guest judge Geri Halliwell. Barlow asked him "How the hell have you kept that voice hidden until now?", and Maloney admitted that he had previously filled out the application form for the show, but tore it up every year due to his nerves and other people telling him he was not good enough. All four judges gave him a "Yes" and he advanced to boot camp. He made it to the judges' houses stage alongside Nicola Marie, Melanie Masson, Carolynne Poole, Brad Shackleton and Kye Sones. Maloney failed to make it into Barlow's top three contestants as Masson, Poole and Sones were selected ahead of him, but was later thrown a lifeline when it was revealed that all four judges could choose a wildcard, and the wildcard with the most public votes would become the thirteenth contestant. On the night of the first live show, Maloney was announced as the wildcard contestant, beating Times Red, Amy Mottram and Adam Burridge to win the final spot in the live shows.

Maloney took on the role of The X Factor novelty act for the ninth series. Despite being dubbed a "cabaret" and "cruise ship" singer by Walsh, Maloney advanced on the public vote nine times, receiving the most votes from weeks 1–7 before being eliminated from the first of the live final shows. During January & February 2013, Maloney appeared on the Live X Factor tour across the UK.

Despite initial nerves during his audition, Maloney became a fan favorite, receiving the highest public votes for several consecutive weeks. However, he faced criticism from some judges and media outlets, being labeled a "cruise ship" singer. Maloney later revealed that the negative attention led to significant stress and a breakdown after the show concluded.

=== 2013–present: Post X Factor ===
In April 2013, in an interview with the Liverpool Echo, Maloney confirmed that he had signed a contract with independent record label Tristar Records. On 27 October 2013, he released his debut single "My Heart Belongs to You".

Following his time on The X Factor, Maloney experienced severe anxiety and underwent therapy to cope with the aftermath of public scrutiny . He has also spoken about suffering from body dysmorphia, leading to multiple cosmetic surgeries.

Christopher opened his first performing arts school in Liverpool on 9 June 2014. Maloney established the academy to nurture the talent of the younger generation in Merseyside. Of his venture, he said: "I want to give something back to the community. I'm trying to make the performing arts accessible to the children."At the academy, the youngsters have the opportunity to train under Maloney's direction, as well as a team of top quality coaches.

In 2016, Maloney opened his second academy in Wirral, which moved to Prenton Park in 2018.

Maloney entered the Celebrity Big Brother house in January 2016. On 26 January 2016, Maloney was the fifth person to be evicted after receiving the fewest votes. He had spent 22 days in the house.

In November 2018, Maloney's debut autobiography, titled Wildcard, was released which chronicles his journey from a nervous auditionee to a national figure, detailing personal struggles and triumphs.

Maloney publicly came out as gay in 2013, stating that he had not previously discussed his sexuality to protect his partner's privacy during the intense media scrutiny of The X Factor.

== Filmography ==
=== Television ===
Year	Title	Role	Notes
2012	X Factor	Contestant	Series 9
2016	Celebrity Big Brother	Contestant	Series 17
2019	When Plastic Surgery Goes Wrong	Himself	Channel 5 Documentary

=== Live Tours ===
Year	Title	Role	Notes
2013	The X Factor Live Tour	Vocalist	Touring Production: Manchester Arena - 27 Jan; The Brighton Centre - 30 Jan; Motorpoint Arena Cardiff - 1 Feb; Capital FM Nottingham Arena - 4 Feb; Liverpool Echo Arena - 6 Feb; London O2 - 7 Feb; LG Arena Birmingham - 10 Feb; Motorpoint Arena Sheffield - 12 Feb; SECC Glasgow - 16 Feb; Metro Radio Arena Newcastle - 17 Feb; AECC Aberdeen - 19 Feb; Wembley Arena London - 22 Feb; Wembley Arena London - 23 Feb; Odyssey Arena Belfast - 27 Feb
2019	Dance to the Music	Vocalist	Touring Production 42 UK dates
2019	Cinderella	Prince Charming	Touring Production 12-15 December (Marine Hall, Fleetwood) 21-30 December (Playhouse, Bradford
