= Breaking Me Down =

2008 single by Maria Lawson

Single by Maria Lawson

from the album Emotional Rollercoaster
- B-side: "Sign Your Name"
- Released: 6 September 2008 (digital download); 8 September 2008 (CD single)
- Recorded: 2007–2008
- Genre: Pop, R&B
- Label: Pinnacle Records
- Songwriters: Maria Lawson, Michelle Escoffery, Steve Lewinson, Pete Lewinson

Maria Lawson singles chronology
"Sleepwalking" (2006)	"Breaking Me Down" (2008)

"Breaking Me Down" is a song by British singer Maria Lawson. It was released as a digital download on 6 September 2008 and released as a CD single on 8 September 2008.

== Background ==
The B-side of the single is an acoustic version of "Sign Your Name", originally by Terence Trent D'arby. The song reached number 11 on the UK Independent Singles Chart. Lawson performed the song on 27 July 2008 at Party in the Park in Leeds and appeared on GMTV to promote the single.

== Track listings ==
1. "Breaking Me Down" (3:34)
2. "Sign Your Name" (4:59)

== Charts ==
Chart	Peak position
UK Singles Chart	110
UK Indie Singles Chart	11
Irish Singles Chart	98
