= Maria Lawson =

- Born: 24 May 1979 (age 46)
- Origin: London, England
- Genres: R&B, soul
- Years active: 1996–present
- Labels: Sony BMG, Metamorphis Music, Universal
- Website: Marialawson.co.uk

Maria Lawson (born 24 May 1979) is an English singer. She recorded several singles with Ti.Pi.Cal. Lawson was the fifth contestant eliminated in the second UK series of television talent show The X Factor in 2005. She released her debut self-titled album in 2006. Her self-help/autobiography entitled Life Starts Now was released in November 2008. Lawson appeared in the female lead role in the West End production of Thriller – Live from 14 April 2009 to March 2010. She released her second studio album, Emotional Rollercoaster in 2014. Lawson lives in London with her husband Lawrence and their two children.

== Early life ==
Lawson was born and raised in London. She is the youngest in a family of five, with three brothers and one sister. She is of Jamaican, Chinese and Cuban descent. Her mother is Jamaican, her father has Cuban heritage and her grandfather is Chinese from a family descending from the name Chang.

Before appearing as a contestant on The X Factor finishing in eighth place, Lawson was a client of Active Music Management, who obtained her first record deal with President Records and her first publishing deal. Lawson released her first single, "A Night to Remember," in 1982, which was used in a Gala Bingo advertisement.

Lawson was signed to Peer Music Publishing from 2002 to 2005 and started her career as a singer-songwriter. During that time she worked with established producer David Brant, who produced three tracks for her, "Rush", "I Wanna Say Yes" and "Inferno". During her time as a singer-songwriter, she worked with recording artist Gabrielle and performed on Gabrielle's hit singles "Out of Reach" (as featured in the Bridget Jones's Diary soundtrack), "Don't Need the Sun to Shine (to Make Me Smile)" and the live version of "Rise". She has also provided backing vocals for many other artists, including Kelly Clarkson, Anita Baker and British soul singer Lemar.

== Music career ==
=== 1997–1999: Singer for Italian group Ti.Pi.Cal ===
In 1997, Lawson, known as Kimara Lawson in Italy, achieved chart success with several singles in collaboration with Italian dance group Ti.Pi.Cal. (Daniele Tignino, Riccardo Piparo and Vincenzo Callea). With Ti.Pi.Cal, Lawson recorded "Hidden Passion" (1997), "Live For Today (1997), "Follow Your Heart" (1998), "Music Is My Life" (1999) and What I Like (2006), and two singles as Kimara Lawson - Stand up (2000) & Heaven (2000).

=== 2004–05: The X Factor ===
Lawson auditioned for the first series of The X Factor in 2004, but she was rejected by judge Simon Cowell after reaching the "bootcamp" rounds. In 2005 she auditioned for the second series of the show.

Lawson outlined in her 2008 autobiography life starts now, that during her second audition for The X Factor, Cowell immediately remembered her from the previous year, stating that he had "made a mistake" in not putting her through to the live shows. After performing "Stop" by Sam Brown at her audition, Lawson proceeded through to the bootcamp rounds with fellow singer, Sharon Osbourne emerging as her new mentor. Following the bootcamp rounds, Lawson continued to proceed to the Osbourne household in Los Angeles, where she sang in the live stages of the show as part of Osbourne's top four.

At the beginning of the live shows, Lawson performed "Piece of My Heart" and "You're Beautiful". Lawson became one of the notable returnees, and eventually rose to the top making the top eight. Lawson outlines week four of her live shows, where she performed a cover to cover the James Blunt hit "You're Beautiful", receiving the most public votes for that week.

==== Performances on The X Factor ====
| Round | Song | Result |
|---|---|---|
| Audition (first song) | "Stop!" | Through to Bootcamp |
| Audition (second song) | "Open Arms" | Through to Bootcamp |
| Bootcamp (stage 1) | "All the Man That I Need" | Through to next stage |
| Bootcamp (stage 2) | "I'm Gonna Make You Love Me" | Through to next stage |
| Judges' Houses (top 24) | "Since U Been Gone" | Through to live shows |
| Top 12 | "Emotion" | Safe |
| Top 11 | "The Way You Make Me Feel" | Safe |
| Top 10 | "Piece of My Heart" | Safe |
| Top 9 | "You're Beautiful" | Safe (Highest Votes) |
| Top 8 | "Brown Sugar" | Eliminated (Bottom Two - 7th) |

==== Elimination controversy ====
In the fifth week of the live shows, Lawson performed "Brown Sugar", receiving criticism from judges that it was unsuitable for her. After the public vote, Lawson found herself in the bottom two for the first time with Irish girl group The Conway Sisters. Voting figures showed that Lawson received twice as many votes as The Conway Sisters, meaning that if the result went to deadlock, The Conway Sisters would have been eliminated. Following the sing off, the two out of the three judges voted against Lawson, sending her home. Simon Cowell voted against Lawson, backing his act The Conway Sisters. Louis Walsh also voted against Lawson, stating that he "followed his heart". Lawson's mentor, Sharon Osbourne, said that she was a victim of the "Irish Mafia", referring to Irish judge Walsh's decision to vote in favour of the Irish act at Lawson's expense. This caused a media uproar and Walsh threatened to quit the show after days of negative press.

Lawson's elimination was also a shock for bookmakers who had her as a 66–1 outsider to leave the programme.

=== Post-X Factor: Maria Lawson ===
After Lawson was eliminated from the show, she was approached by at least three major record labels. On 6 March 2006 Lawson announced that she had signed to the Phonogenic branch of the Sony BMG record label. Her debut single, "Sleepwalking", was released on 14 August 2006. BBC Radio 2 "A-listed" the track (putting it on heavy rotation), and it achieved a position of number 20 in the UK Singles Chart. It was later revealed had the UK singles charts recent inclusion of 'downloads' been deducted, based on physical first week sales, "Sleepwalking" would have charted inside the UK top ten. As of 2010, the track has sold over 50,000 copies in the UK alone.

Her self-titled debut album was recorded in Los Angeles where she worked with multi-Grammy winning songwriter Diane Warren, Steve Kipner, Lester Mendez and the Heavy Weights. The album was released on 28 August 2006 and charted at number 41 on the UK Albums Chart. As of 2010, the album has sold over 20,000 copies in the UK. Lawson also went on to sign a lingerie deal with Bravissimo to become the new face and body for the lingerie and clothing line.

On 3 July 2007, Lawson announced in her latest diary entry that she would not be releasing her exclusive second single "Lover's Kiss" (a song not included on her debut album), but would instead be working on her second album. In Lawson's 2008 autobiography, Life Starts Now, she revealed that her then record company, Sony BMG, decided (after much delay) to part ways and not continue with the release of the single.

=== 2008–2010: West End production of Thriller – Live ===
On 27 June 2008, Lawson stated in a MySpace blog that her forthcoming album would be entitled Emotional Rollercoaster and confirmed "Breaking Me Down" as the first single to be released from the album. An interview with Lawson appeared in the June issue of Pride Magazine and a clip of the official video for "Breaking Me Down" was made available on her website. Her website also announced a radio and TV tour across the UK from 18 to 29 August 2008. Lawson performed "Breaking Me Down", along with a rendition of Janis Joplin's classic hit "Piece of My Heart" (a song which she had performed during her run on The X Factor), at Party in the Park, Temple Newsham, Leeds on Sunday 27 July. She performed the single again at the Freedom Festival on 30 August 2008. The single was released on 8 September 2008.

Lawson was interviewed on GMTV on Friday 24 October 2008, promoting "Breaking Me Down" and her new book Life Starts Now.

Lawson's self-help/autobiography entitled Life Starts Now was released to stores on 28 November 2008. It follows Lawson's journey from hopeful unknown, through the audition process and beyond to her appearance on a major national television show.

On 11 April 2009, it was announced on Lawson's Myspace page that she would be performing the female lead role in the West End production of Thriller – Live at The Lyric Theatre, Shaftesbury Avenue, London. The show features the hit songs of Michael Jackson and the Jackson 5. Lawson's run lasted through from 14 April 2009 to March 2010.

=== 2010–present: Emotional Rollercoaster ===
In October 2010, Lawson signed a lingerie deal with Brastop to be the face and body of the brand for 2011.

Lawson began her attempt to represent Switzerland at the Eurovision Song Contest 2012 in September 2011, by submitting the song "Champion". However, the song failed to reach the final.

Lawson's second studio album, Emotional Rollercoaster, was produced by Brian Rawling. In a Myspace blog in 2011, Lawson revealed she had returned to the recording studio to re-record and remix some of the tracks. Emotional Rollercoaster is due out some time in 2014 through Right Track Music/Universal Music Operations.

Lawson has been signed to Wilhelmina in the US, one of the most prominent model and celebrity agencies in the fashion industry with offices in New York, Los Angeles, Philadelphia and Miami.

== Personal life ==
Lawson gave birth to her first son in February 2008. She currently lives with her husband Lawrence and son in Canary Wharf, London.

Lawson gave birth to her second child, a daughter, in January 2012.

== Discography ==
=== Albums ===
| Year | Album details | Chart peak positions | | Sales |
| Year | Album details | UK | IRE | Sales |
|---|---|---|---|---|
| 2006 | Maria Lawson: Released: 28 August 2006; Label: Sony BMG; Format: CD, digital download | 41 | — | United Kingdom: 20,000 |
| 2014 | Emotional Rollercoaster: Unreleased; Label: Universal Music Group; Format: CD, digital download | —N/a | | |

=== Singles ===
| Year | Single | Chart positions | | | Album |
| Year | Single | UK | AUS | IRE | Album |
|---|---|---|---|---|---|
| 2006 | "Sleepwalking" | 20 | 67 | 44 | Maria Lawson |
| 2008 | "Breaking Me Down" | 110 | — | 98 | —N/a |
| 2011 | "These Walls" | N/A | N/A | N/A | —N/a |
| 2011 | "Turn You Loose" | N/A | N/A | N/A | —N/a |
| 2011 | "In the Middle of the Night" | N/A | N/A | N/A | —N/a |
| 2012 | "Champion" | — | — | — | —N/a |

=== Collaborations ===
| Year | Title | Chart positions |
| Year | Title | UK |
|---|---|---|
| 2003 | "Whatcha Gonna Do" (Michael Gray Presents. Hi Fashion featuring Maria Lawson) | 102 |
| 2003 | "You're Free" (Yomanda featuring Maria Lawson) | 22 |
