= Home (Journey South album) =

Studio album by Journey South
- Released: 22 October 2007
- Genre: Pop rock
- Length: 43:22
- Label: MX3

Journey South chronology
Journey South (2006)	Home (2007)

Professional ratings
Review scores
Source	Rating
Allmusic	link

Home is the second album from The X Factor UK series 2 finalists Journey South. It was released in 2007 (see 2007 in music).

The album charted at number 42 on the UK albums chart with sales of 5,120.

== Track listing ==
1. "Gone One Day" - 3:35
2. "Do You Think Of Me" - 3:27
3. "What I Love About Home" - 3:19
4. "End Of The World" - 4:10
5. "Reconcile Our Love" - 3:49
6. "Save Me" - 3:44
7. "I Stand Corrected" - 3:34
8. "How Do You Mend A Broken Heart" - 3:50
9. "In Your Eyes" - 3:31
10. "(It's OK) To Be In Love" - 3:47
11. "Lonely Nights" - 3:39
12. "I'll Be Your Desire" - 2:57
