= Journey South (album) =

Studio album by Journey South
- Released: 20 March 2006
- Recorded: 2005–06
- Genre: Pop
- Length: 39:31
- Label: Syco, Sony BMG
- Producer: Steve Robson, Richard Flack, Graham Stack, Brian Rawling, Paul Meehan

Journey South chronology
Journey South (2006)	Home (2007)

Professional ratings
Review scores
Source	Rating
AllMusic	link

Journey South is the debut studio album from The X Factor UK series 2 finalists Journey South. It was released on 20 March 2006 and entered the UK Albums Chart on 26 March 2006 at number one, selling 216,000 copies in its first week. The album had sold 414,000 copies as of December 2012.

The album contains covers of The Beatles' "Let It Be", U2's "I Still Haven't Found What I'm Looking For", Cyndi Lauper's Time After Time", Roxette's "It Must Have Been Love", and "English Rose" by The Jam.

== Track listing ==
No.	Title	Writer(s)	Producer(s)	Length
1.	"The First Time Ever I Saw Your Face"	Ewan MacColl	Steve Robson	3:39
2.	"Let It Be"	Lennon–McCartney	Robson, Richard Flack	3:47
3.	"Desperado"	Glenn Frey, Don Henley	Robson, Flack	3:40
4.	"The Circle"	Damon Minchella, Simon Fowler, Oscar Harrison, Steve Cradock	Robson, Flack	3:36
5.	"Nobody Knows"	Don DuBose, Joe Rich	Robson, Flack	3:13
6.	"I Still Haven't Found What I'm Looking For"	Adam Clayton, David Evans, Paul Hewson, Larry Mullen	Robson, Flack	3:52
7.	"All of You"	Andrew Pemberton, Carl Pemberton, Graham Stack, Cliff Masterson	Stack, Brian Rawling	3:43
8.	"Time After Time"	Cyndi Lauper, Rob Hyman	Robson, Flack	4:05
9.	"It Must Have Been Love"	Per Gessle	Rawling, Paul Meehan	3:34
10.	"All That I Am"	A. Pemberton, C. Pemberton, Paul Barry	Stack, Rawling	3:33
11.	"English Rose"	Paul Weller	Rawling, Meehan	2:43

== Charts and certifications ==
=== Weekly charts ===
Chart (2006)	Peak position
Irish Albums (IRMA)	15
Scottish Albums (OCC)	1
UK Albums (OCC)	1

=== Year-end charts ===
Chart (2006)	Position
UK Albums (OCC)	44

=== Certifications ===
Region	Certification	Certified units/sales
United Kingdom (BPI)	Platinum	414,000
