= Rhythmix =

Organization

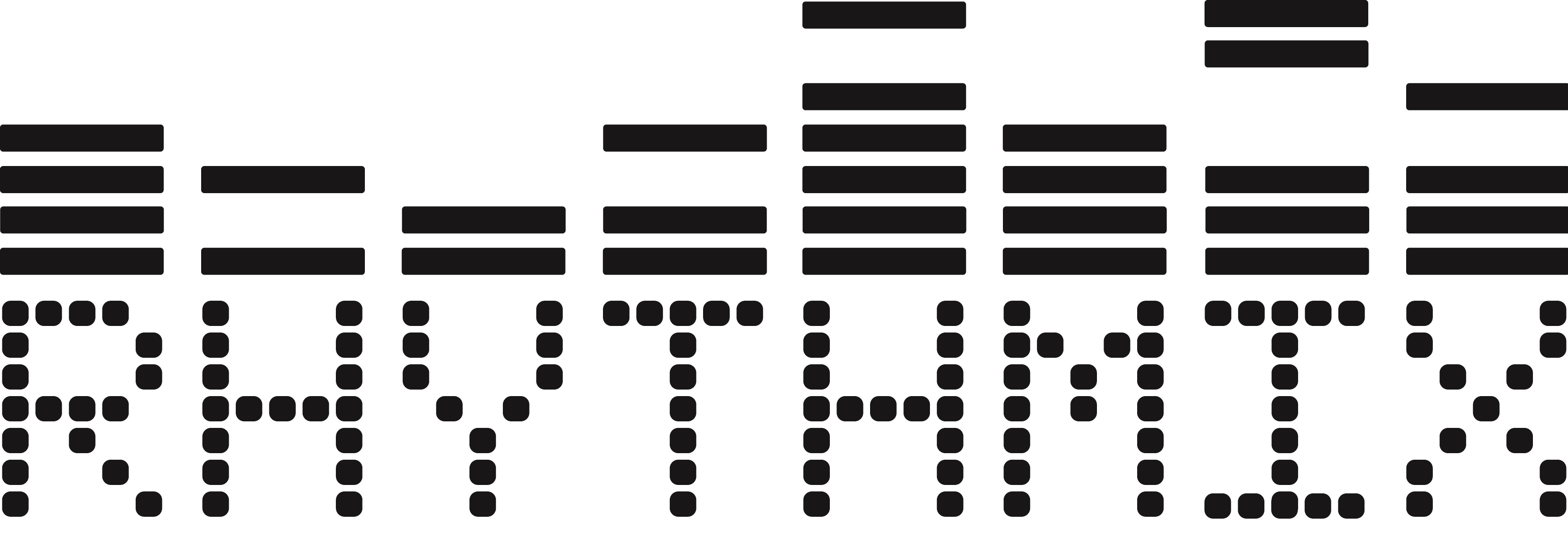
- Founded: 1999
- Type: Youth music
- Registration no.: 1125646
- Purpose: Challenging circumstances
- Location: South East England, UK
- Region served: South East England
- Employees: 10
- Website: rhythmixmusic.org.uk

Rhythmix is a United Kingdom music charity that provides a range of music-making opportunities for young people across the South East region. Since 1999, Rhythmix has worked with more than 40,000 young people.

== Activities ==
Rhythmix works with partner organisations to provide music-making opportunities to children and young people in challenging circumstances, and to people with dementia.

Rhythmix has five main fields of work:

- Alternative Education – Music-making for children and young people outside of mainstream schools
- Make Waves – Music-making sessions for 11-19 year olds across Hastings and Rother
- SEN/D: Innovate – Musical opportunities for children and young people with special educational needs and disabilities
- Music in Mind – Group music-making for children and young people with acute mental health problems
- Wishing Well – Music-making in healthcare settings for unwell children and people with dementia

== 2011 The X Factor dispute ==
In 2011, Rhythmix came to widespread media attention when the television presenter and music promoter Simon Cowell attempted to trademark the name Rhythmix in relation to a girl group that featured on the eighth series of The X Factor. After a legal challenge, Cowell's company, Syco, dropped the trademarking application and the group agreed to change their name to Little Mix.

In response to the X Factor naming controversy, an online protest was launched that promoted the Nirvana single "Smells Like Teen Spirit" to become 2011 Christmas number one in the UK Singles Chart. This was an attempt to emulate a successful 2009 Facebook campaign that promoted Rage Against the Machine's song "Killing in the Name" and prevented the X Factor winner from taking the spot. The attempt failed: Little Mix got their number one the week before Christmas, and singing group Military Wives took the Christmas number one.
