= Journey South =

English singing duo

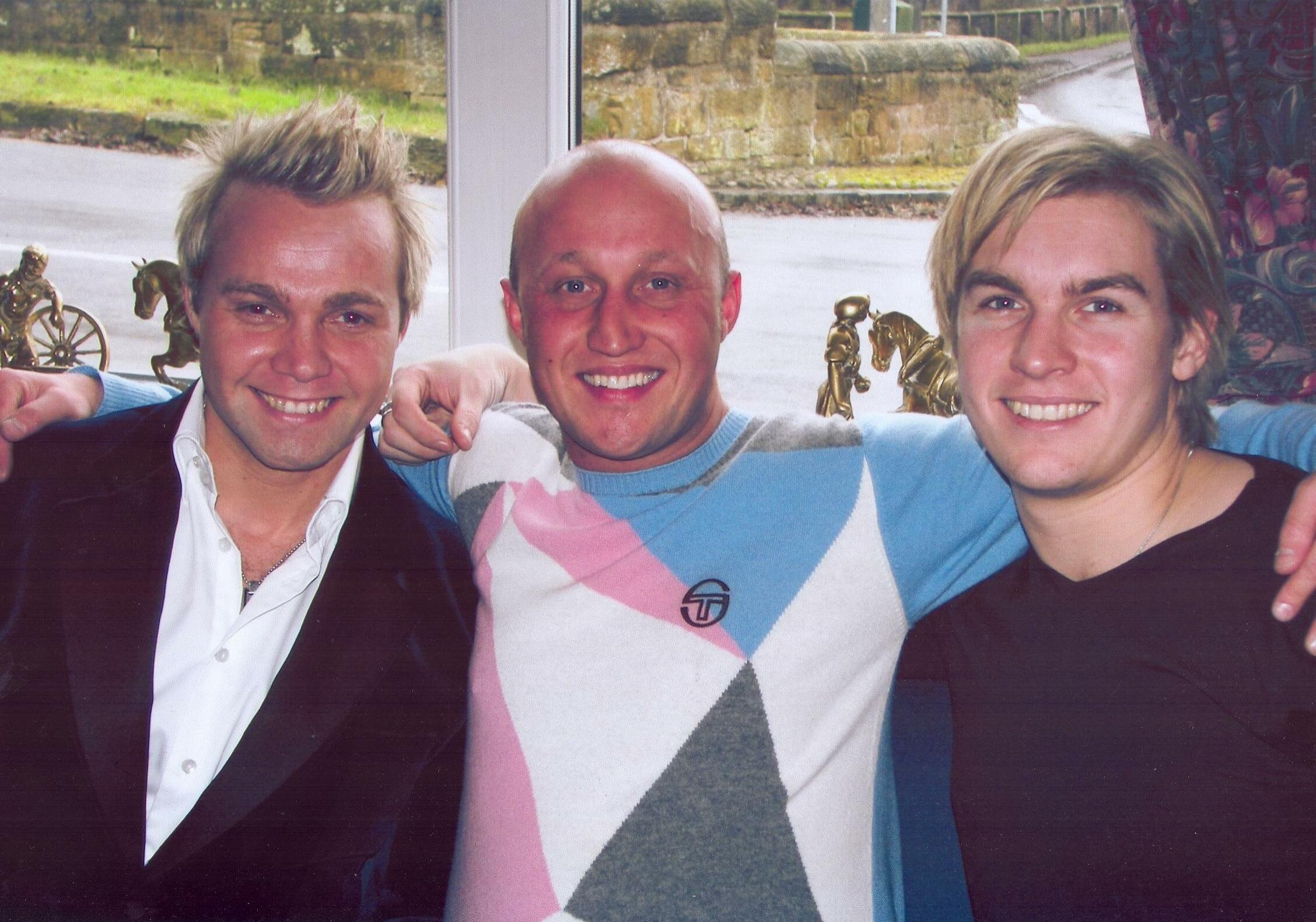

Background information
- Origin: Middlesbrough, North Yorkshire, England
- Genres: Pop, rock, pop rock
- Years active: 2005–2015, 2020-present
- Label: Sony-BMG (2006–2007) ANCA (2007–15)
- Members: Carl Pemberton; Andy Pemberton

Journey South are an English singing duo, consisting of brothers Andy and Carl Pemberton. They are from Middlesbrough, North Yorkshire. Initially the brothers lead a five-piece rock band 'The Answer' featuring musicians from the North East of England. After various line-up changes the band moved from Teesside to Essex in July 2000 changing their name to Journey South and becoming a four-piece pop/rock band. The initial line-up of Journey South featured Andy and Carl Pemberton along with Paul Williams on keyboard, Max Justice on drums and Matt Ellis on bass. The line up disbanded in 2001 leaving Andy and Carl as the only members. The duo were the last contestant eliminated on the second UK series of television talent show The X Factor in 2005. In July 2015, Andy announced that Journey South had disbanded. However, they have since returned, releasing new songs on Spotify and new videos on YouTube.

== Post X Factor ==
The edition of 28 December 2005 of the Teesside Evening Gazette reported that Journey South had received five recording contract offers, and had signed with the one they "wanted to work with most". This was later confirmed to be Sony BMG, the label on which they released their debut album, Journey South, on 20 March 2006. Fellow X Factor contestants G4, Chico Slimani and Steve Brookstein were signed to the same label.

On 26 March 2006, their debut album entered the UK Albums Chart at No 1, selling 216,000 albums in its first week and beating the first album by fellow X Factor finalist Andy Abraham. Their first week sales were also higher than X Factor winner Shayne Ward's first album which sold 201,000 even with the help of a single for promotion. Journey South released their first single on 19 June 2006. It was a double A-side featuring their cover of Ocean Colour Scene's "The Circle" and a re-recorded version of "Desperado".

The duo decided to leave Sony BMG and X Factor creator/producer Simon Cowell on amicable terms in August 2007. They formed their own record label, ANCA, through which the duo's second album, Home, was released on 22 October 2007, along with a single, "What I Love About Home", a week earlier. This single was chart-ineligible due to an alleged printing error. The album reached No. 43. In February 2008 a second single, "Reconcile Our Love", was released but failed to chart.

In early 2025, the brothers were planning to join former member of British boyband, East 17, Brian Harvey and 1990s British girl group, Vanilla (group) in an attempt to complete the Three Poles Challenge.

== The X Factor performances ==
- "Something About the Way You Look Tonight" (Elton John) – 15 October
- "Desperado" (The Eagles) – 22 October
- "Angel of Harlem" (U2) – 29 October
- "The First Time Ever I Saw Your Face" – 5 November
- "Livin' on a Prayer" (Bon Jovi) – 12 November
- "Angels" (Robbie Williams) – 19 November
- "I Still Haven't Found What I'm Looking For" (U2) – 26 November
- "Candle in the Wind" (Elton John) – 3 December
- "Bad Day" (Daniel Powter) – 3 December
- "Let it Be" (The Beatles) – 11 December
- "You're in My Heart" (Rod Stewart) – 11 December
- "Don't Let the Sun Go Down on Me" (Elton John & George Michael) – 17 December
- "Happy Xmas (War Is Over)" – 17 December
- "Let It Be" (The Beatles) – 17 December

== Discography ==
=== Studio albums ===
Year	Name	Charts	
Year	Name	UK	IRE
2006	Journey South	1	15
2007	Home	43	–

=== Singles ===
- 2006: "The Circle" / "Desperado" (19 June 2006)
- 2007: "What I Love about Home" (15 October 2007)
- 2008: "Reconcile Our Love" (February 2008)
- 2009: "What I Love About Home (the Help For Heroes)" (December 2009)
