= The Conway Sisters =

Former Irish singing group

The Conway Sisters were a semi-professional singing group from County Sligo, Ireland, who achieved a measure of fame through their appearance in the final stages of the second UK series of television talent show The X Factor in 2005 been the seventh contestant eliminated. The group were nominated in the "best Irish pop act" category at the 2006 Meteor Awards.

== Formation ==
Four sisters, Laura, Marie, Sharon and Sinead Conway, were born and raised in County Sligo, Ireland. They formed a group, The Conway Sisters, in 2002. Throughout 2002 they wrote, produced, and recorded music, and performed locally. In 2003, they released their first single, "What Do You Do?", which debuted in the Top 20 in Ireland. A second single, "Now That It's Over", followed in 2004, and their third single, "Miss You", entered the Top 20 in the Irish charts in May 2005. Their self-financed debut album, Waiting for You, was released in May 2005.

== The X Factor ==
In May 2005, the sisters auditioned for the UK television programme The X Factor, and made it through to the final live stages of the competition. In week 5 of The X Factor knockout stages, The Conways found themselves in the final showdown alongside Maria Lawson. Lawson was voted off on the casting vote of Louis Walsh, prompting booing from the studio audience and fellow judge Sharon Osbourne to state that he had "voted with his passport", referring to the fact that Walsh was also Irish. The decision provoked some controversy in the UK media, and it was reportedly revealed that Walsh had known the Conways prior to the competition.

Following their nomination for expulsion and the generally negative comments of their mentor, Simon Cowell, the Conways worked for the next episode of the show without his guidance. They were eliminated in week 7, their third consecutive week in the bottom two, after Cowell voted against them – the first and so far only time that an X Factor judge had voted off their own act. Following the final of The X Factor, they performed with the other Top 7 contestants from the live shows on The X Factor Live tour at venues throughout the UK.

== Breakup ==
In August 2006, on the ITV show The X Factor – One Year On, Laura Conway announced that the Conways had split up for good. A message on their official website said: "We will be finishing up as the Conway Sisters for now, we've come to a place where we want to pursue individual career paths and now we feel ready to do that!"

Following the split, Laura Conway reportedly moved to the US, Sinead Conway was performing with a wedding band, and (as of 2011) Sharon Conway was also "fronting her own band".
