= The X Factor (British TV series) series 1 =

British TV competition

The X Factor
- Series 1
- Presented by: Kate Thornton (ITV); Ben Shephard (ITV2)
- Judges: Simon Cowell; Sharon Osbourne; Louis Walsh
- Winner: Steve Brookstein
- Winning mentor: Simon Cowell
- Runner-up: G4

Release
- Original network: ITV; ITV2 (The Xtra Factor)
- Original release: 4 September – 11 December 2004

Series chronology
- Next → Series 2

The X Factor is a British television music competition to find new singing talent; the winner of which receives a £1 million recording contract with the Syco Music record label. The first series was broadcast from 4 September to 11 December 2004. The competition was split into several stages: auditions, bootcamp, judges' homes and live shows, with Louis Walsh, Sharon Osbourne and Simon Cowell as judges. Kate Thornton presented the show on ITV, whilst Ben Shephard presented the spin-off show The Xtra Factor on ITV2.

Auditions were held in Dublin, Newcastle, London, Leeds, Birmingham and Glasgow.

Steve Brookstein won the series, with Cowell as the winning mentor. Brookstein went on to have some chart success, with runner-up group G4 achieving two platinum albums before splitting up in 2007, but reuniting in 2014.

== Selection process ==
Judges and Presenter(s) for The X Factor Series 1

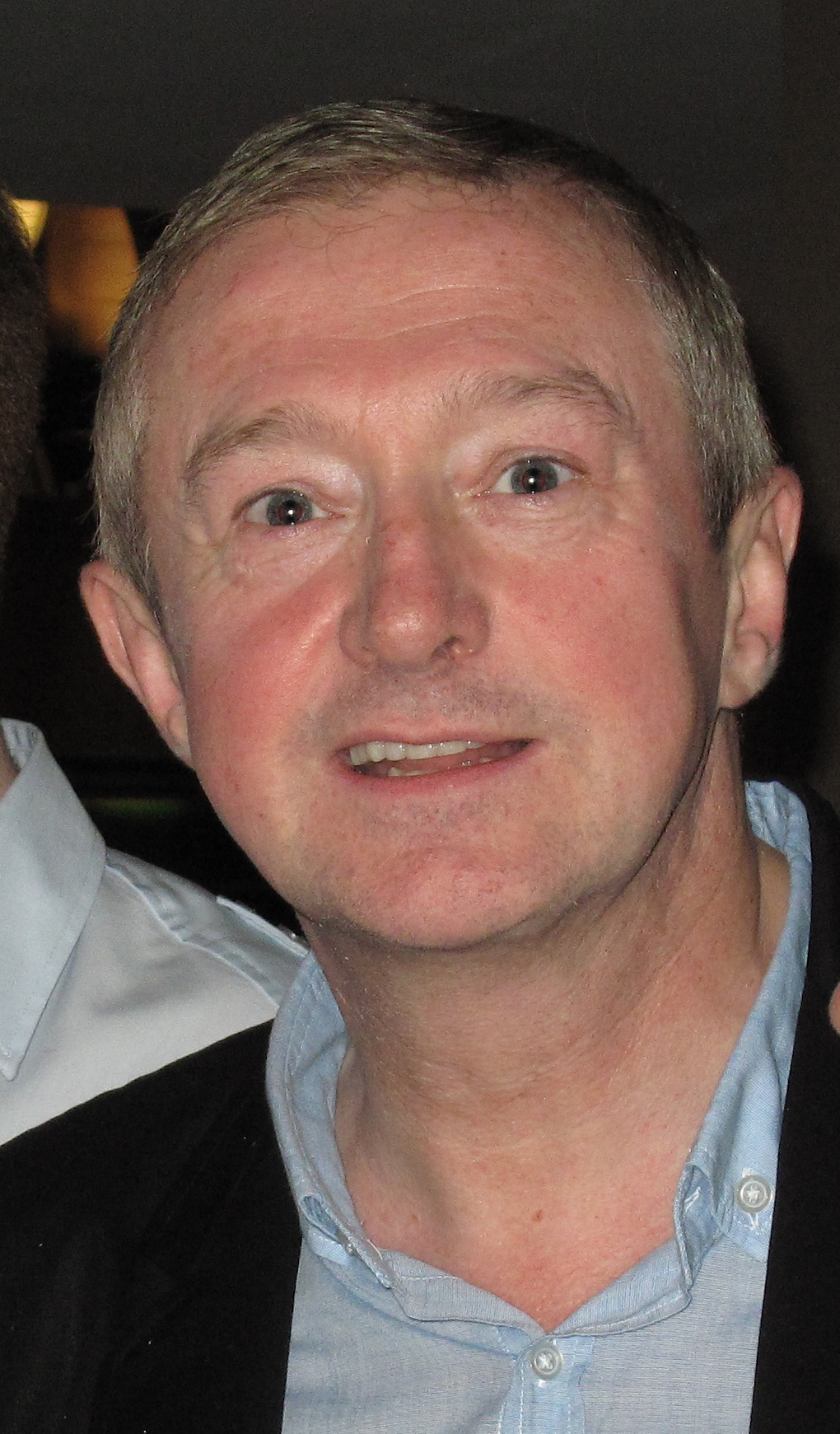
Louis Walsh

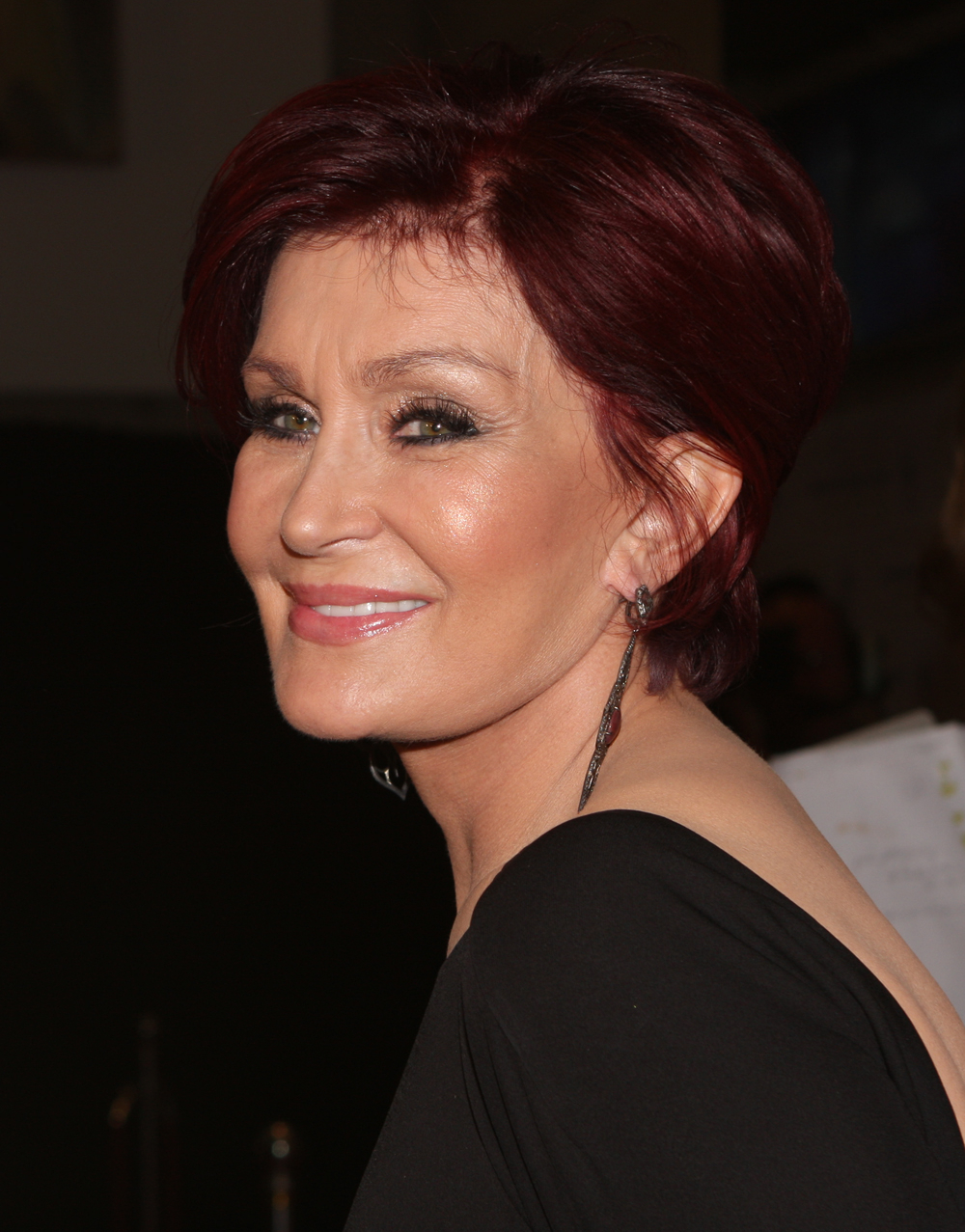
Sharon Osbourne

Simon Cowell

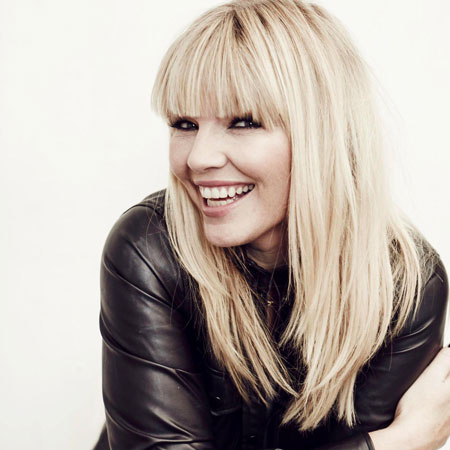
Kate Thornton (ITV1)

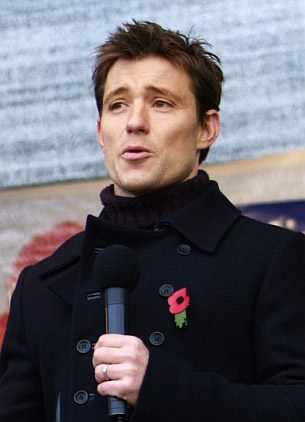
Ben Shephard (ITV2)

=== Applications and auditions ===
Before the auditions, advertisements appeared on ITV, newspapers, and trade magazines, promising that the new show would encourage groups to join, and while the emphasis was on singing, would welcome those who played musical instruments and wrote their own songs. The show would differentiate itself from its predecessor, Pop Idol.

For the first episode of auditions, which aired on 4 September 2004, the judges visited Leeds and London. The second episode aired on 11 September 2004 in which the judges visited Newcastle. The third aired on 18 September 2004, the fourth on 25 September 2004 and the fifth on 2 October 2004.

=== Bootcamp and judges' houses ===
After the auditions, each judge was allocated a category at random:

- Simon Cowell: Over 25s
- Sharon Osbourne: 16-24s
- Louis Walsh: Groups

Each judge chose 12 acts from their category to go through to round two. After bootcamp, each judge selected five acts to progress to the judges' homes round. The bootcamp episodes aired on 9 and 16 October 2004.

In judges' homes, the 15 acts went to the homes of their respective judges, where they were interviewed and performed again. Each judge then chose three acts to go through to the live shows, making a total of nine contestants.

Bootcamp Tasks per Category

16-24s:

Location: Hackney Empire

Task 1: Perform "Isn't She Lovely" by Stevie Wonder in lines of 10.

Task 2: Giving a solo performance of one of these two chosen songs below:

- "Love Grows (Where My Rosemary Goes)"
- "Midnight Train to Georgia"

Task 3: Interviews in front of the press and talking about their personal lives.

Task 4: Choose one song from The Beatles back-catalogue and perform it in front of their competitors and Sharon.

Groups:

Location: Angel Recording Studios

Task 1: Perform a song of their own choosing in front of Louis and his team.

Task 2: Write an original song entitled "Right Now" that must contain all these five words:

- Dreams
- Hope
- Anticipation
- Chance
- All the Way

Task 3: Learn a new song overnight

Task 4: Sing a song that they think that showcases all of their members voices to the best of their ability.

Over 25s:

Location: The Landmark London

Task 1: Both the females and males perform one song of their choice separately one at a time with the opposite gender watching their performance.

Task 2: Learn a new song overnight with another member of the category to perform as a duo.

Task 3: Perform a song that will convince Simon and his panel that they are capable of moving on to the next round.

Judges Houses Performances (Groups and 16-24s)

16-24s:

- Cassie: "Anyone Who Had a Heart"
- Megan: "Fly Me to the Moon"
- Andy: "Try a Little Tenderness"
- Roberta: "Cry Me a River"
- Tabby: "Maggie May"

Groups:

- Voices With Soul: "I Will Always Love You"
- 2 to Go: "From This Moment On"
- 4Tune: Original Song
- Advance: "To Love Somebody"
- G4: "Creep"

Summary of judges' houses
Judge	Category	Location	Assistants	Acts Eliminated
Cowell	Over 25s	London	Annie Skates, Sinitta	Odis Palmer, Lloyd Wade
Osbourne	16-24s	Buckinghamshire	Mark Hudson, Terry Longden, Jack Osbourne	Megan Ramsay, Andy Steed
Walsh	Groups	Dublin	Linda Martin, Faye Sawyer, David Laudat	4Tune, Advance

== Acts ==
Key:

– Winner
– Runner-Up

Act	Age(s)	Hometown	Category (mentor)	Result
Steve Brookstein	35	London	Over 25s (Cowell)	Winner
G4	22-24	Various	Groups (Walsh)	Runner-up
Tabby Callaghan	23	County Sligo, Ireland	16-24s (Osbourne)	3rd place
Rowetta Satchell	38	Manchester	Over 25s (Cowell)	4th place
Cassie Compton	17	North London	16-24s (Osbourne)	5th place
Voices with Soul	25-42	Luton	Groups (Walsh)	6th place
2 to Go	23-24	Notts	Groups (Walsh)	7th place
Verity Keays	51	Grimsby, Lincolnshire	Over 25s (Cowell)	8th place
Roberta Howett	23	Dublin, Ireland	16-24s (Osbourne)	9th place

== Live shows ==
=== Format ===
Two live shows were broadcast each Saturday evening during the competition. Until week 5, each act performed once in the first show, then the public voted for the act that they wanted to remain in the show. In the other results show, the two acts with the fewest votes were revealed. These two acts then had to sing again before the three judges decided whom to eliminate.

The format changed in the sixth week: each act performed twice in the first show and performed one of their songs in the results show. The act with the fewest votes was eliminated at the end of the second show.

The live shows started on 23 October 2004 and ended on 11 December 2004.

=== Results summary ===
Colour key

Act in 16-24s

Act in Over 25s

Act in Groups

–	Act was in the bottom two and had to sing again in the final showdown
–	Act received the fewest public votes and was immediately eliminated (no final showdown)
–	Act received the most public votes

Weekly results per act
Act	Week 1	Week 2	Week 3	Week 4	Week 5	Quarter-Final	Semi-Final	Final
Steve Brookstein	Safe	Safe	Safe	Safe	Safe	Safe	Safe	Winner
G4	Safe	Safe	Safe	Bottom Two	Safe	Safe	Safe	Runner-Up
Tabby Callaghan	Safe	Safe	Safe	Safe	Bottom Two	Safe	3rd	Eliminated (semi-final)
Rowetta Satchell	Safe	Safe	Safe	Safe	Safe	4th	Eliminated (quarter-final)	
Cassie Compton	Safe	Safe	Safe	Safe	Bottom Two	Eliminated (week 5)		
Voices with Soul	Bottom Two	Safe	Bottom Two	Bottom Two	Eliminated (week 4)			
2 to Go	Safe	Bottom Two	Bottom Two	Eliminated (week 3)				
Verity Keays	Safe	Bottom Two	Eliminated (week 2)					
Roberta Howett	Bottom Two	Eliminated (week 1)						
Final Showdown	Howett, Voices with Soul	2 to Go, Keays	2 to Go, Voices with Soul	G4, Voices with Soul	Callaghan, Compton	No final showdown or judges' votes; results were based on public votes alone		
Walsh's vote to eliminate (Groups)	Howett	Keays	2 to Go	Voices with Soul	Compton	No final showdown or judges' votes; results were based on public votes alone		
Osbourne's vote to eliminate (16-24s)	Voices with Soul	Keays	2 to Go	Voices with Soul	None (abstained)	No final showdown or judges' votes; results were based on public votes alone		
Cowell's vote to eliminate (Over 25s)	Howett	2 to Go	N/A^{1}	G4	Compton	No final showdown or judges' votes; results were based on public votes alone		
Eliminated	Roberta Howett; 2 of 3 votes Majority	Verity Keays; 2 of 3 votes Majority	2 to Go; 2 of 2 votes Majority	Voices with Soul; 2 of 3 votes Majority	Cassie Compton; 2 of 2 votes Majority	Rowetta Satchell; Public vote to save	Tabby Callaghan; Public vote to save	G4; Public vote to win

^1 Cowell was not required to vote as there was already a majority.

=== Live show details ===
==== Week 1 (23 October) ====
- Best Bits song: "Beautiful"

Acts' performances on the first live show
Act	Order	Song (Original artist)	Result
Voices with Soul	1	"Ain't No Mountain High Enough" (Nickolas Ashford & Valerie Simpson)	Bottom Two
Verity Keays	2	"I Will Always Love You" (Dolly Parton)	Safe
Roberta Howett	3	"Superstar" (Carpenters)	Eliminated
2 to Go	4	"Don't Know Much" (Linda Ronstadt)	Safe
Steve Brookstein	5	"When a Man Loves a Woman" (Percy Sledge)	Safe
Cassie Compton	6	"Alfie" (Cilla Black)	Safe
G4	7	"Everybody Hurts" (R.E.M)	Safe
Rowetta Satchell	8	"You Don't Have to Say You Love Me" (Dusty Springfield)	Safe
Tabby Callaghan	9	"You Really Got Me" (The Kinks)	Safe

Judges' votes to eliminate

- Walsh: Roberta Howett – backed his own act, Voices with Soul.
- Osbourne: Voices with Soul – backed her own act, Roberta Howett.
- Cowell: Roberta Howett – based on the final showdown performances, but felt that neither act deserved to be in the bottom two.

==== Week 2 (30 October) ====
- Best bits song: "Over The Rainbow"

Acts' performances on the second live show
Act	Order	Song	Result
Rowetta Satchell	1	"I Still Haven't Found What I'm Looking For" (U2)	Safe
2 to Go	2	"Always" (Atlantic Starr)	Bottom Two
Cassie Compton	3	"Without You" (Mariah Carey)	Safe
Verity Keays	4	"Wind Beneath My Wings" (Bette Midler)	Eliminated
G4	5	"Don't Look Back in Anger" (Oasis)	Safe
Tabby Callaghan	6	"My Oh My" (Slade)	Safe
Steve Brookstein	7	"If You Don't Know Me by Now" (Simply Red)	Safe
Voices with Soul	8	"(You Make Me Feel Like) A Natural Woman" (Aretha Franklin)	Safe

Judges' votes to eliminate

- Walsh: Verity Keays – backed his own act, 2 to Go.
- Cowell: 2 to Go – backed his own act, Verity Keays.
- Osbourne: Verity Keays – gave no reason.

==== Week 3 (6 November) ====
- Best bits song: "(I Just) Died in Your Arms"

Acts' performances on the third live show
Act	Order	Song	Result
Tabby Callaghan	1	"Addicted to Love" (Robert Palmer)	Safe
Voices with Soul	2	"Bridge Over Troubled Water" (Simon & Garfunkel)	Bottom Two
Steve Brookstein	3	"Smile" (Charlie Chaplin)	Safe
2 to Go	4	"(I've Had) The Time of My Life"(from Dirty Dancing)	Eliminated
Cassie Compton	5	"I Say a Little Prayer" (Dionne Warwick)	Safe
Rowetta Satchell	6	"Over the Rainbow" (Judy Garland)	Safe
G4	7	"...Baby One More Time" (Britney Spears)	Safe

Judges' votes to eliminate

- Osbourne: 2 to Go – gave no reason.
- Walsh: 2 to Go – said he did not want to send either of his acts home. He asked to vote last but Thornton pressed him for his decision.
- Cowell was not required to vote as there was already a majority.

==== Week 4 (13 November) ====
- Best bits song: "That's What Friends Are For"

Acts' performances on the fourth live show
Act	Order	Song	Result
G4	1	"Circle of Life" (Elton John)	Bottom Two
Rowetta Satchell	2	"MacArthur Park" (Donna Summer)	Safe
Tabby Callaghan	3	"I Don't Want to Miss a Thing"(Aerosmith)	Safe
Voices With Soul	4	"Lady Marmalade" (Labelle)	Eliminated
Cassie Compton	5	"Hero" (Mariah Carey)	Safe
Steve Brookstein	6	"Help Me Make It Through the Night" (Kris Kristofferson)	Safe

Judges' votes to eliminate

- Osbourne: Voices with Soul – based on the final showdown performances, and believed that G4 had a future in a recording career.
- Cowell: G4 – gave no reason.
- Walsh: Voices with Soul – said he did not want to send either of his acts home, saying the result was worse than last week; he tried to back out but Thornton forced him for his decision.

==== Week 5 (20 November) ====
- Best bits song: "Goodbye"

Acts' performances on the fifth live show
Act	Order	Song	Result
Steve Brookstein	1	"Let's Stay Together" (Al Green)	Safe
Cassie Compton	2	"All by Myself" (Eric Carmen)	Eliminated
G4	3	"My Way" (Frank Sinatra)	Safe
Tabby Callaghan	4	"Sweet Child o' Mine" (Guns N' Roses)	Bottom Two
Rowetta Satchell	5	"Somewhere" (from West Side Story)	Safe

Judges' votes to eliminate

- Walsh: Cassie Compton – originally gave no reason, but when asked said he believed Callaghan could win the competition.
- Osbourne abstained from voting as both acts were in her category. Thornton tried to remind her of her duty to vote between her acts as Walsh did in the previous two results shows, but Osbourne still refused to vote against either of her acts, citing her loyalty to both of them. Following this, Thornton warned Cowell that if he voted to eliminate Callaghan, the result would revert to the public vote to decide who would be eliminated.
- Cowell: Cassie Compton – wanted to win the competition and believed Callaghan was his biggest threat but after deliberating on whether to eliminate either Callaghan or Compton, who he felt was the weakest, opted to vote against Compton.

==== Week 6: Quarter-Final (27 November) ====
- Best bits song: "She"

Acts' performances in the quarter-final
Act	Order	First song	Order	Second song	Result
Rowetta Satchell	1	"River Deep - Mountain High" (Tina Turner)	5	"When You Tell Me That You Love Me" (Diana Ross)	Eliminated
G4	2	"You'll Never Walk Alone" (from Carousel)	6	"Somebody to Love" (Queen)	Safe
Steve Brookstein	3	"I Get the Sweetest Feeling" (Jackie Wilson)	7	"If I Could Turn Back the Hands of Time" (R.Kelly)	Safe
Tabby Callaghan	4	"More Than Words" (Extreme)	8	"Livin' on a Prayer" (Bon Jovi)	Safe

The quarter-final did not feature a final showdown and instead the act with the fewest public votes, Rowetta Satchell, was automatically eliminated

==== Week 7: Semi-Final (4 December) ====
- Best bits song: "I Don't Want to Miss a Thing"

Acts' performances in the semi-final
Act	Order	First song	Order	Second song	Result
Tabby Callaghan	1	"Pride (In the Name of Love)" (U2)	4	"Sailing" (Rod Stewart)	Eliminated
Steve Brookstein	2	"Have I Told You Lately" (Van Morrison)	5	"Greatest Love of All" (George Benson)	Safe
G4	3	"O Holy Night" (Traditional)	6	"Bohemian Rhapsody" (Queen)	Safe

The semi-final did not feature a final showdown and instead the act with the fewest public votes, Tabby Callaghan, was automatically eliminated.

==== Week 8: Final (11 December) ====
- Musical guests: Robert Unwin ("Tragedy")

Acts' performances in the final
Act	Order	First song	Order	Second song (song of the series)	Originally performed in....	Order	Third song (winner's single)	Result
Steve Brookstein	1	"(Your Love Keeps Lifting Me) Higher and Higher"	3	"Smile"	Live Show 3	5	"Against All Odds (Take a Look at Me Now)"	Winner
G4	2	"Nessun Dorma"	4	"Bohemian Rhapsody"	Live Show 7	6	"Creep"	Runner-Up

== Reception ==
=== Ratings ===
Episode	Air date	Official ITV1 rating (millions)	Weekly rank (millions)
Auditions 1	4 September	5.25	39
Auditions 2	11 September	6.53	26
Auditions 3	18 September	7.08	21
Auditions 4	25 September	7.24	21
Auditions 5	2 October	6.71	26
Bootcamp 1	9 October	6.69	28
Bootcamp 2	9 October	7.89	23
Judges' houses	16 October	7.32	23
Live show 1	23 October	7.19	25
Live results 1	23 October	7.83	19
Live show 2	30 October	6.53	28
Live results 2	30 October	7.26	25
Live show 3	6 November	6.89	29
Live results 3	6 November	7.02	28
Live show 4	13 November	7.42	22
Live results 4	13 November	6.88	26
Live show 5	20 November	7.91	25
Live results 5	20 November	7.98	23
Live show 6	27 November	8.06	29
Live results 6	27 November	8.01	30
Live semi-final	4 December	7.79	27
Live results 7	4 December	7.52	30
Final	11 December	8.62	21
Final results	11 December	9.96	13
Series average	2004	7.40	—

== Controversies ==
=== Cheating ===
It was reported in tabloid newspapers that the show's audition process was unfair after Walsh was accused of cheating. He was thought to have advised the group Co-Ed on things such as song choices, which caused controversy after it was revealed that he had actually previously managed Co-Ed after they appeared on the Irish version of Popstars in 2001. Also, footage of Cowell and Osbourne coaching contestants to argue back to the judges was being auctioned over the Internet.

=== Claims of Rigging ===
Before the first live show, Osbourne accused Cowell of "rigging" the show by editing footage to make the contestants in his category more appealing to viewers. Osbourne attracted criticism again following the final in December 2004 when she was forced to make an apology after attracting what Cowell referred to as "record complaints" over an outburst by Osbourne in which she criticised eventual winner Steve Brookstein. This left her place on the show uncertain, although she returned for the second series in 2005.
