= The X Factor (British TV series) series 2 =

British TV competition

The X Factor
- Series 2
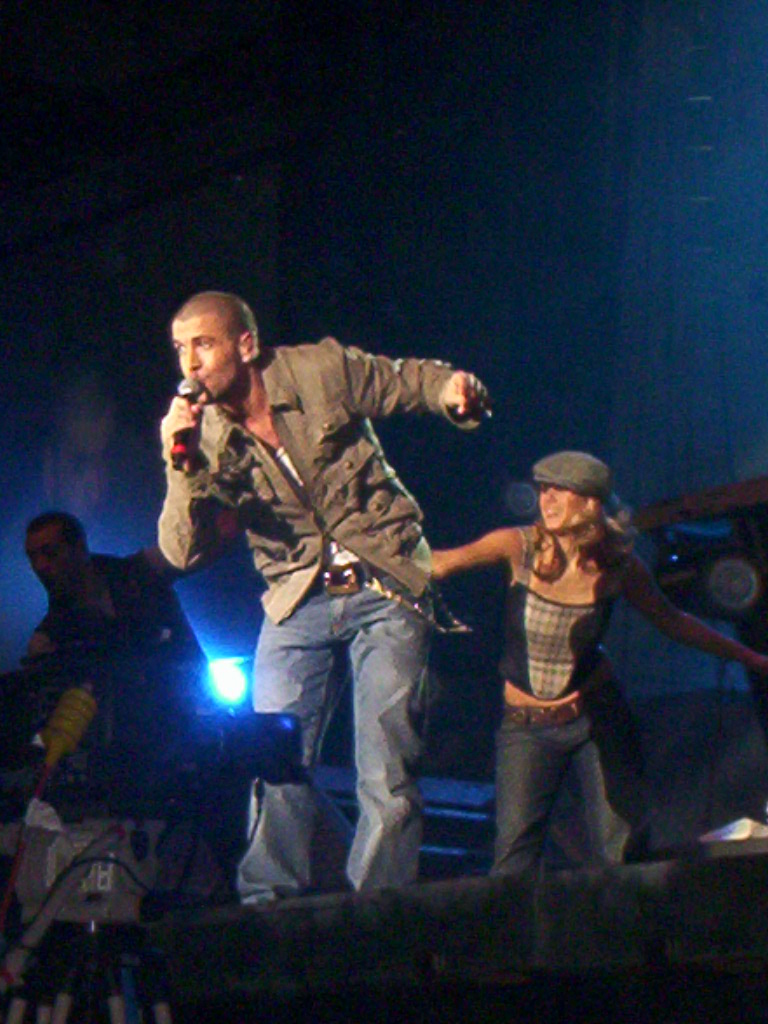
- Ward performing during the Shayne Ward Live 2007 tour.
- Hosted by: Kate Thornton (ITV); Ben Shephard (ITV2)
- Judges: Simon Cowell; Sharon Osbourne; Louis Walsh
- Winner: Shayne Ward
- Winning mentor: Louis Walsh
- Runner-up: Andy Abraham

Release
- Original network: ITV; ITV2 (The Xtra Factor)
- Original release: 20 August – 17 December 2005

Series chronology
- ← Previous; Series 1 Next → Series 3

The X Factor is a British television music competition to find new singing talent. The second series ran from 20 August to 17 December 2005. Shayne Ward became the winner and Louis Walsh emerged as the winning mentor. The second series was longer than the first, with seven acts in each of the three categories going to the judges' homes, and 12 acts in the live shows instead of 9. Kate Thornton returned as presenter of the main show on ITV and Ben Shephard presented the spin-off show The Xtra Factor on ITV2, while Simon Cowell, Sharon Osbourne and Walsh returned as judges. 75,000 people auditioned for the series.

On the back of their performances and popularity in the competition, Ward (winner), Andy Abraham (runner-up), Journey South (last contestant eliminated) and Maria Lawson (second contestant eliminated) landed recording contracts. Chico Slimani (fifth contestant eliminated) also released a single which topped the UK Singles Chart.

Aired on 24 September 2005, the mentoring selection was made, with Cowell in charge of Groups, Osbourne with the 25 and overs and Walsh managing the 16–24s. The bootcamp stages were shown on 1 October 2005, and those who got through were taken to the "judges' homes".

== Judges, Presenters and Other Personnel ==
Judges and Presenter(s) for The X Factor Series 2

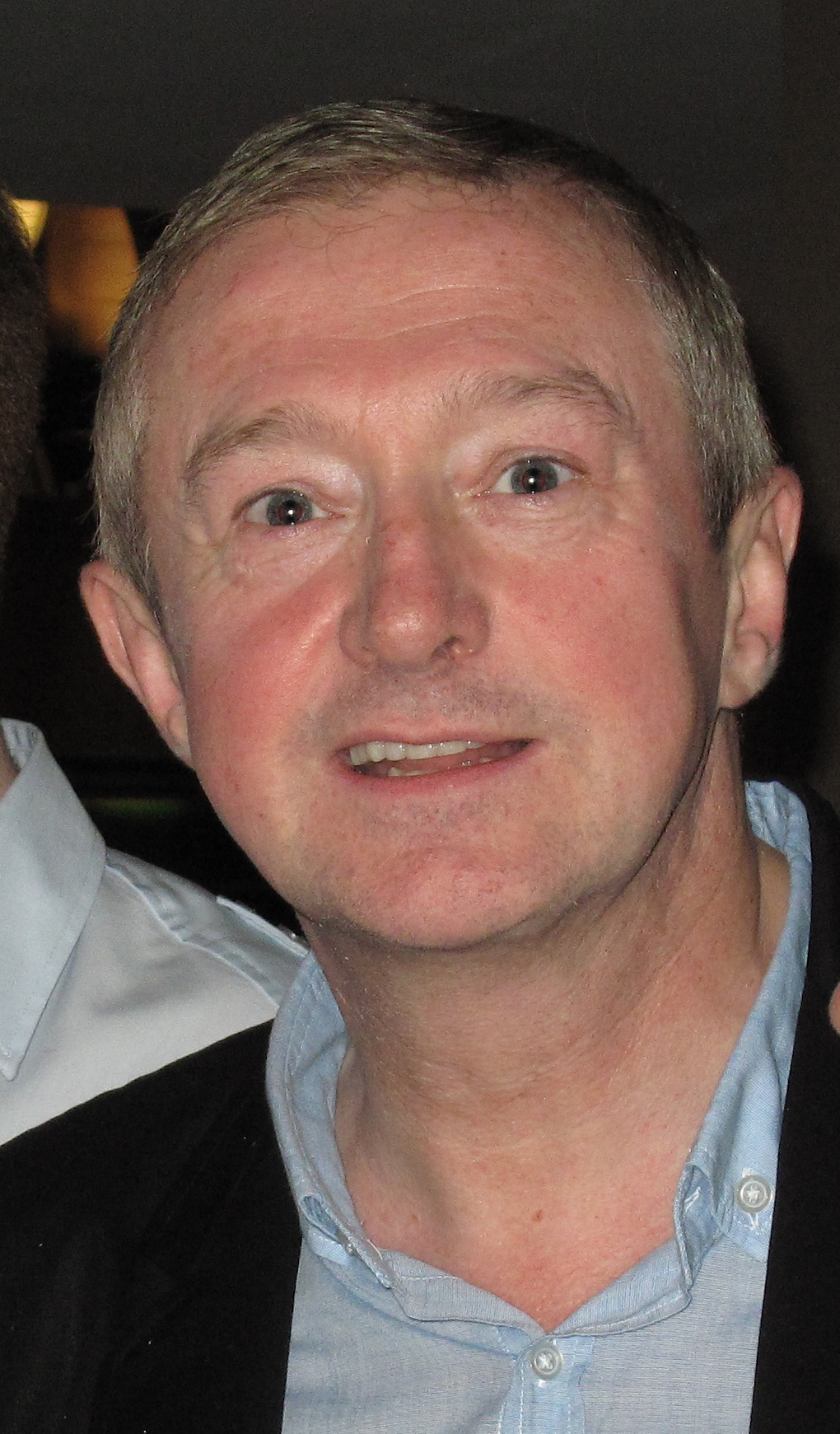
Louis Walsh

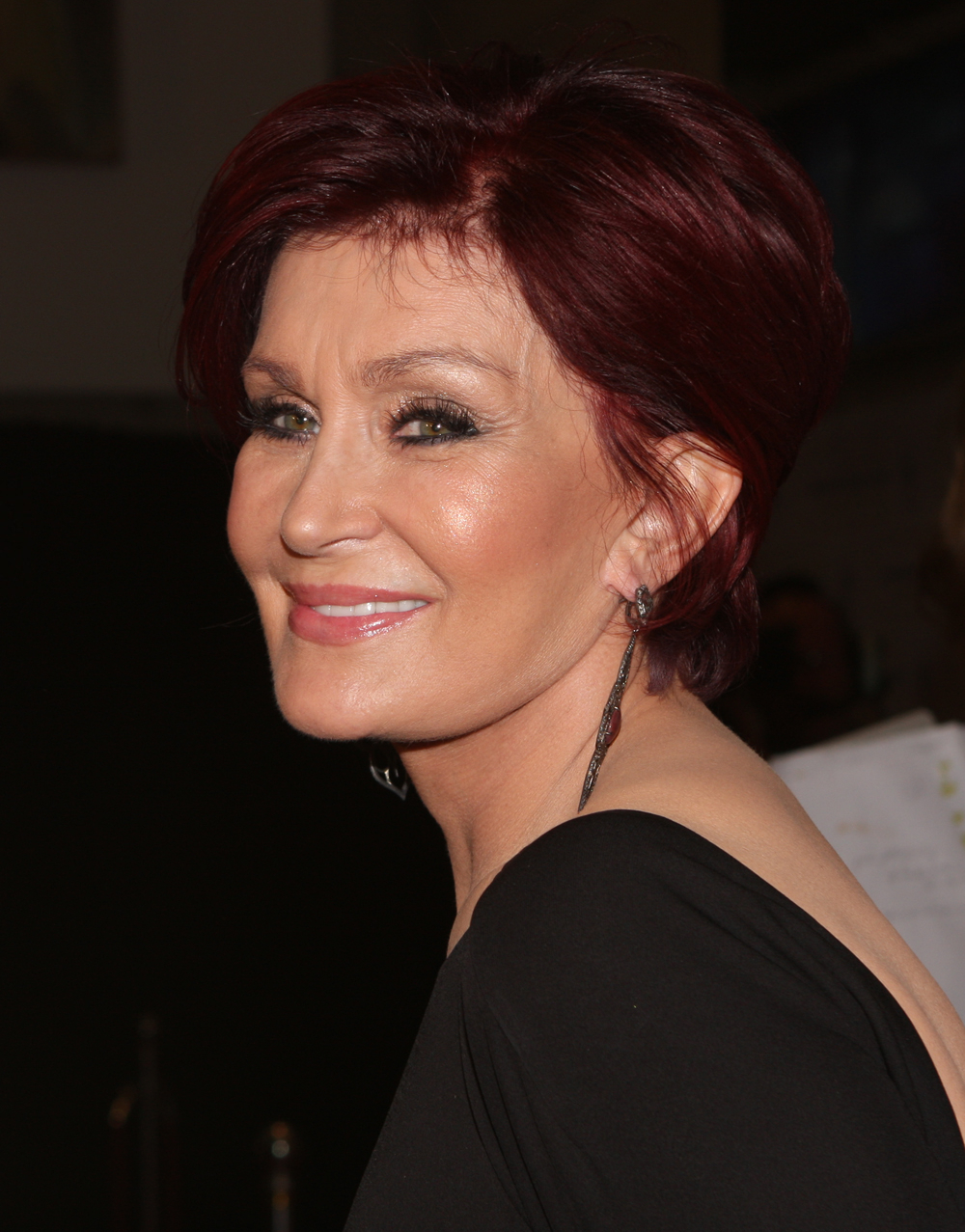
Sharon Osbourne

Simon Cowell

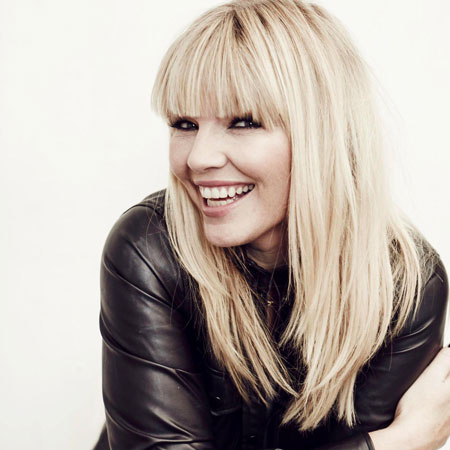
Kate Thornton (ITV1)

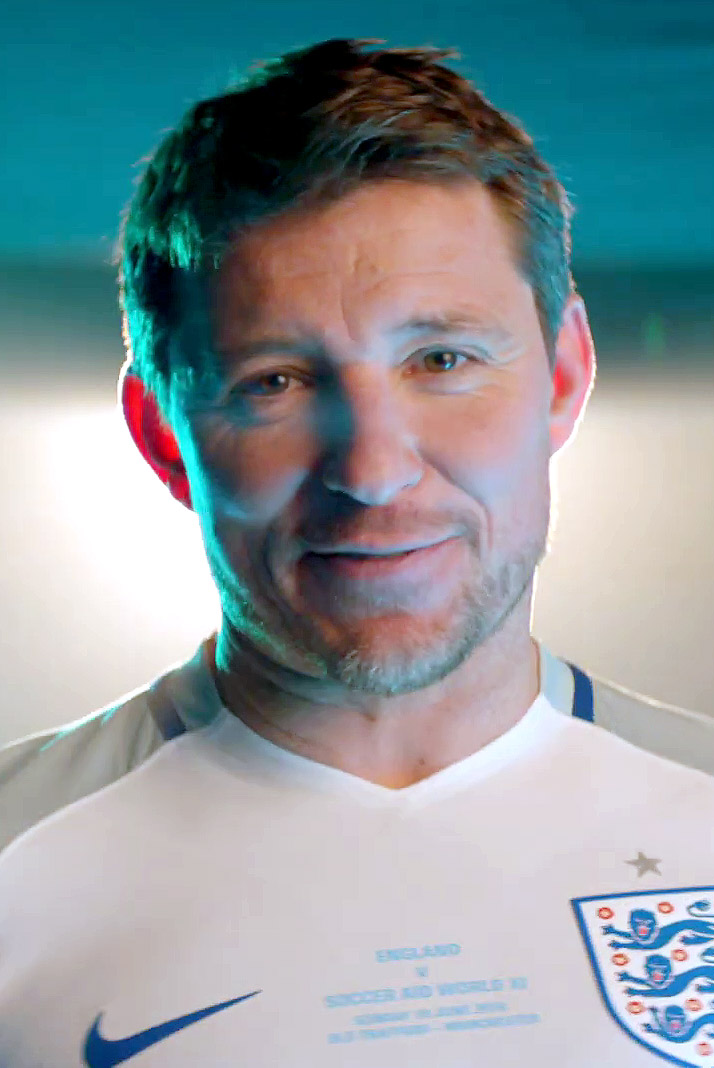
Ben Shephard (ITV2)

Simon Cowell, Sharon Osbourne and Louis Walsh returned as judges, quashing rumours that Osbourne and Walsh might not return for financial reasons. Kate Thornton also returned as presenter of the main show on ITV and Ben Shephard returned as presenter of spin-off show The Xtra Factor on ITV2. Yvie Burnett joined the show as vocal coach.

== Selection process ==
The auditions episodes were broadcast on 20 August 27 August 3 September 10 September 17 and 24 September 2005. The first two episodes of Bootcamp aired on 1 October 2005 and the last two the following week on 8 October 2005.

Bootcamp Tasks per Category

16-24s:

Location: artsdepot

Task 1 Songs:

- "Unchained Melody"
- "Careless Whisper"
- "To Love Somebody"
- "From This Moment On"
- "Beautiful"

Task 2 Songs: The 21 remaining contestants in the 16-24s category were divided into three groups of 7 with one song in each of the groups. Each contestant then performed their chosen song solo in front of Louis and his team. The songs were.

- "I'll Be There"
- "End of the Road"
- "Always on My Mind"

Groups:

Location: An Manor House within the Oxfordshire countryside.

Task 1: Perform both an uptempo and a slow song to show versatility.

Task 2: Learn one song of their choice within an hour and then perform it to Simon and his team.

Over 25s:

Location: Café de Paris

Task 1: Perform a song of their choice to Sharon and the rest of the contestants.

Task 2: Choose a song from a list of five and learn it overnight to perform for a place in Judges Houses. The songs performed during this round were:

- "Don't Let the Sun Go Down on Me"
- "I'm Gonna Make You Love Me"
- "Walk on By"
- "I Only Want to Be with You"
- Last song Not mentioned

Judges Houses Performances

- Contestant highlighted in bold advanced.

Over 25s:

- **Maria: "Since U Been Gone"**
- Richie: "One"
- Haifa: "(Your Love Keeps Lifting Me) Higher and Higher"
- **Andy: "My Cherie Amour"**
- **Brenda: "I Just Want to Make Love to You"**
- Joanne: "Right Here Waiting"
- **Chico: "Livin' la Vida Loca"**

Groups:

- The Brothers: "What Becomes of the Brokenhearted"
- **4Tune: "I Don't Want to Talk About It"**
- 4th Base: "Your Song"
- **The Conway Sisters: "You Raise Me Up"**
- Eskimo Blonde: "Total Eclipse of the Heart"
- **Journey South: "Desperado"**
- **Addictiv Ladies: "Wishing on a Star"**

16-24s

- **Shayne: "The Air That I Breathe"**
- James: "Lately"
- Alexandra: "Almaz"
- **Chenai: "I'm Still Waiting"**
- **Phillip: "Don't Forget to Remember"**
- **Nicholas: "You Make Me Feel Brand New"**
- Trevor: "This Is the Moment"

Summary of judges' houses
Judge	Category	Location	Acts Eliminated
Cowell	Groups	Marbella	4th Base; Eskimo Blonde; The Brothers
Osbourne	Over 25s	Beverly Hills	Richie Glynn; Joanne Hindley; Haifa Kayali
Walsh	16-24s	Dublin	James Bellamy; Alexandra Burke; Trevor Hodgson

== Acts ==
Key:

– Winner
– Runner-up

Act	Age(s)	Hometown	Category (mentor)	Result
Shayne Ward	21	Manchester	16-24s (Walsh)	Winner
Andy Abraham	41	North London	Over 25s (Osbourne)	Runner-up
Journey South	25 & 30	Middlesbrough, North Yorkshire	Groups (Cowell)	3rd place
Brenda Edwards	36	Luton	Over 25s (Osbourne)	4th place
Chico Slimani	34	Bridgend	Over 25s (Osbourne)	5th place
The Conway Sisters	17-28	County Sligo, Ireland	Groups (Cowell)	6th place
Nicholas Dorsett	18	London Borough of Enfield	16-24s (Walsh)	7th place
Maria Lawson	26	London	Over 25s (Osbourne)	8th place
Chenai Zinyuku	19	Bradford	16-24s (Walsh)	9th place
Phillip Magee	21	Larne	16-24s (Walsh)	10th place
4Tune	18-21	Southampton	Groups (Cowell)	11th place
Addictiv Ladies	16-17	London	Groups (Cowell)	12th place

== Live shows ==
The live shows began on 15 October 2005, and the final was broadcast live on 17 December 2005.

=== Results summary ===
Colour key

Act in 16-24s

Act in Over 25s

Act in Groups

–	Act was in the bottom two and had to sing again in the final showdown
–	Act received the fewest public votes and was immediately eliminated (no final showdown)
–	Act received the most public votes

Weekly results per act
Act	Week 1	Week 2	Week 3	Week 4	Week 5	Week 6	Week 7	Quarter-Final	Semi-Final	Final	
Act	Week 1	Week 2	Week 3	Week 4	Week 5	Week 6	Week 7	Quarter-Final	Semi-Final	First Vote	Second Vote
Shayne Ward	Safe	1st ^{5}	Safe	Safe	Safe	2nd^{5}	Safe	Safe	Safe	Safe	Winner; 50.6%^{6}
Andy Abraham	1st ^{5}	Safe	1st ^{5}	Safe	Safe	1st ^{5}	Safe	Safe	Safe	Safe	Runner-Up; 49.4%^{6}
Journey South	Safe	Safe	Safe	Safe	2nd^{5}	4th^{5}	Safe	Safe	Safe	3rd	Eliminated (final)
Brenda Edwards	Safe	Safe	Safe	Safe	3rd^{5}	5th^{5}	Safe	Safe	4th	Eliminated (semi-final)	
Chico Slimani	Bottom Two	Safe	Bottom Two	Safe	Safe	3rd^{5}	Bottom Two	5th	Eliminated (quarter-final)		
The Conway Sisters	Safe	Safe	Safe	Safe	8th^{4}	7th^{5}	Bottom Two	Eliminated (week 7)			
Nicholas Dorsett	Safe	Safe	Safe	Bottom Two	1st ^{5}	6th ^{5}	Eliminated (week 6)				
Maria Lawson	Safe	Safe	Safe	1st^{3}	7th^{4}	Eliminated (week 5)					
Chenai Zinyuku	Safe	Bottom Two	Safe	Bottom Two	Eliminated (week 4)						
Phillip Magee	Safe	Safe	Bottom Two	Eliminated (week 3)							
4Tune	Safe	Bottom Two	Eliminated (week 2)								
Addictiv Ladies	Bottom Two	Eliminated (week 1)									
Final Showdown	Addictiv Ladies, Slimani	4Tune, Zinyuku	Magee, Slimani	Dorsett, Zinyuku	The Conway Sisters, Lawson	The Conway Sisters, Dorsett	The Conway Sisters, Slimani	No final showdown or judges' votes; results were based on public votes alone			
Walsh's vote to eliminate (16-24s)	Addictiv Ladies	4Tune	Slimani	Zinyuku	Lawson	The Conway Sisters	N/A^{2}	No final showdown or judges' votes; results were based on public votes alone			
Osbourne's vote to eliminate (Over 25s)	Addictiv Ladies	4Tune	Magee	Dorsett	The Conway Sisters	Dorsett	The Conway Sisters	No final showdown or judges' votes; results were based on public votes alone			
Cowell's vote to eliminate (Groups)	Slimani	Zinyuku	Magee	Zinyuku	Lawson	Dorsett	The Conway Sisters^{1}	No final showdown or judges' votes; results were based on public votes alone			
Eliminated	Addictiv Ladies; 2 of 3 votes Majority	4Tune; 2 of 3 Votes; Majority	Phillip Magee; 2 of 3 votes Majority	Chenai Zinyuku; 2 of 3 votes Majority	Maria Lawson; 2 of 3 votes Majority	Nicholas Dorsett; 2 of 3 votes Majority	The Conway Sisters; 2 of 2 votes Majority	Chico Slimani; Public vote to save	Brenda Edwards; Public vote to save	Journey South; Public vote to save	Andy Abraham; Public vote to win

^1 For the only time in The X Factor history, a judge made an unforced decision to eliminate one of their own acts over another judge's act.
^2 Walsh was not required to vote as there was a majority.
^3 In Lawson's 2008 autobiography, Life Starts Now, she revealed she had topped the vote the week before her elimination.
^4 According to voting figures published in the Sunday Mirror, Lawson turned out to have received twice as many public votes as the Conway Sisters.
^5 Some of the voting results were also published in the same edition of the Sunday Mirror, the full voting results of the sixth week, Dorsett turned out to have topped the fifth week, Abraham topped the first, third and sixth weeks and Ward topped the second week.
^6 Thornton said just before the winner was announced, that there was a 1.2% voting difference between Ward and Abraham.

=== Live show details ===
==== Week 1 (15 October) ====
- Best bits song: "That's What Friends Are For"

Acts' performances on the first live show
Act	Order	Song	Result
Addictiv Ladies	1	"Superstar" (Jamelia)	Eliminated
Shayne Ward	2	"Right Here Waiting" (Richard Marx)	Safe
Chico Slimani	3	"Da Ya Think I'm Sexy?" (Rod Stewart)	Bottom Two
Journey South	4	"Something About the Way You Look Tonight" (Elton John)	Safe
Phillip Magee	5	"Amazed" (Lonestar)	Safe
Brenda Edwards	6	"Son of a Preacher Man" (Dusty Springfield)	Safe
The Conway Sisters	7	"SOS" (ABBA)	Safe
Nicholas Dorsett	8	"On the Wings of Love" (Jeffrey Osborne)	Safe
Maria Lawson	9	"Emotion" (Destiny’s Child)	Safe
4Tune	10	"I Want It That Way" (Backstreet Boys)	Safe
Chenai Zinyuku	11	"The Closest Thing to Crazy" (Katie Melua)	Safe
Andy Abraham	12	"Greatest Love of All" (George Benson)	Safe (Highest Votes)

Judges' votes to eliminate

- Cowell: Chico Slimani – said that the judges had to pick the real talent over a "joke act", effectively backing his own act, Addictiv Ladies.
- Osbourne: Addictiv Ladies – backed her own act, Chico Slimani, whose performance she said was more exciting.
- Walsh: Addictiv Ladies – said that Slimani had the whole entertainment package.

==== Week 2 (22 October) ====
- Best bits song: "You Are Not Alone"

Contestants' performances on the second live show
Act	Order	Song	Result
Andy Abraham	1	"You to Me Are Everything" (The Real Thing)	Safe
Chenai Zinyuku	2	"Young Hearts Run Free" (Candi Staton)	Bottom Two
4Tune	3	"I'll Be There" (Jackson 5)	Eliminated
Chico Slimani	4	"Play That Funky Music" (Wild Cherry)	Safe
Nicholas Dorsett	5	"Let's Get It On" (Marvin Gaye)	Safe
The Conway Sisters	6	"You Raise Me Up" (Westlife)	Safe
Maria Lawson	7	"The Way You Make Me Feel" (Michael Jackson)	Safe
Phillip Magee	8	"Wind Beneath My Wings" (Roger Whittaker)	Safe
Journey South	9	"Desperado" (Eagles)	Safe
Brenda Edwards	10	"Rescue Me" (Fontella Bass)	Safe
Shayne Ward	11	"If You're Not the One" (Daniel Bedingfield)	Safe (Highest Votes)

Judges' votes to eliminate

- Cowell: Chenai Zinyuku – gave no reason, though effectively backed his own act, 4Tune.
- Walsh: 4Tune – gave no reason, though effectively backed his own act, Chenai Zinyuku.
- Osbourne: 4Tune – appeared to have a hard time deciding which act to eliminate, especially since she had previously eliminated Zinyuku at judges' houses in series 1. Thornton told Osbourne that if she did not vote within the allotted time, the result would go to deadlock and revert to the public vote to decide who would be eliminated. At the last second, Osbourne said Zinyuku's name, but when asked by Thornton to clarify if she was voting to eliminate Zinyuku, she said that she was in fact voting to save Zinyuku.

==== Week 3 (29 October) ====
- Best bits song: "Amazed"

Acts' performances on the third live show
Act	Order	Song	Result
Phillip Magee	1	"Johnny B. Goode" (Chuck Berry)	Eliminated
Brenda Edwards	2	"Midnight Train to Georgia" (Gladys Knight & the Pips)	Safe
Shayne Ward	3	"Summer of '69" (Bryan Adams)	Safe
Chico Slimani	4	"Livin' la Vida Loca" (Ricky Martin)	Bottom Two
The Conway Sisters	5	"Total Eclipse of the Heart" (Bonnie Tyler)	Safe
Chenai Zinyuku	6	"Hero" (Mariah Carey)	Safe
Andy Abraham	7	"Unforgettable" (Nat King Cole)	Safe (Highest Votes)
Journey South	8	"Angel of Harlem" (U2)	Safe
Nicholas Dorsett	9	"Let's Stay Together" (Al Green)	Safe
Maria Lawson	10	"Piece of My Heart" (Janis Joplin)	Safe

Judges' votes to eliminate

- Osbourne: Phillip Magee – gave no reason, though effectively backed her own act, Chico Slimani.
- Walsh: Chico Slimani – gave no reason, though effectively backed his own act, Phillip Magee.
- Cowell: Phillip Magee – he thought the public would want to see Slimani more.

==== Week 4 (5 November) ====
- Best bits song: "Wishing on a Star"

Acts' performances on the fourth live show
Act	Order	Song	Result
Brenda Edwards	1	"Somebody Else's Guy" (Jocelyn Brown)	Safe
Nicholas Dorsett	2	"I Want You Back" (Jackson 5)	Bottom Two
Andy Abraham	3	"Can't Take My Eyes Off You" (Andy Williams)	Safe
Chenai Zinyuku	4	"Always on My Mind" (Elvis Presley)	Eliminated
Chico Slimani	5	"Kiss" (Prince)	Safe
Journey South	6	"The First Time Ever I Saw Your Face" (Roberta Flack)	Safe
Maria Lawson	7	"You're Beautiful" (James Blunt)	Safe (Highest Votes)
Shayne Ward	8	"You Make Me Feel Brand New" (Simply Red)	Safe
The Conway Sisters	9	"One Voice" (Barry Manilow)	Safe

Judges' votes to eliminate

- Osbourne: Nicholas Dorsett – said that Zinyku deserved her place in the competition more.
- Cowell: Chenai Zinyuku – said that Dorsett had not been in the bottom two previously and deserved a second chance.
- Walsh: Chenai Zinyuku – said that it was a tough decision to choose between his own acts.

==== Week 5 (12 November) ====
- Best bits song: "Didn't We Almost Have It All"

Acts' performances on the fifth live show
Act	Order	Song	Result
Shayne Ward	1	"Cry Me a River" (Justin Timberlake)	Safe
Maria Lawson	2	"Brown Sugar" (The Rolling Stones)	Eliminated
The Conway Sisters	3	"Hold On" (Wilson Phillips)	Bottom Two
Andy Abraham	4	"I'll Make Love to You" (Boyz II Men)	Safe
Journey South	5	"Livin' on a Prayer" (Bon Jovi)	Safe
Chico Slimani	6	"Hero" (Enrique Iglesias)	Safe
Nicholas Dorsett	7	"I Believe I Can Fly" (R.Kelly)	Safe (Highest Votes)
Brenda Edwards	8	"Heartbreaker" (Dionne Warwick)	Safe

Judges' votes to eliminate

- Osbourne: The Conway Sisters – gave no reason, though effectively backed her own act, Maria Lawson.
- Cowell: Maria Lawson – gave no reason, though effectively backed his own act, The Conway Sisters.
- Walsh: Maria Lawson – went with his heart.

Walsh's decision to eliminate Lawson caused controversy when Osbourne accused Walsh of being part of the "Irish Mafia", since both he and The Conway Sisters are Irish. Cowell, though backed his own act to eliminate Lawson, said that if he had to go with his heart, he would have sent his own act home. He felt they would not have a chance to win, and that Lawson had more talent and her elimination would be the first one that the public would disagree with.

However, voting statistics revealed that Lawson received more votes than The Conway Sisters which meant that if the result had reverted back to the public vote, The Conway Sisters would have been eliminated.

==== Week 6 (19 November) ====
- Best bits song: "End of the Road"

Acts' performances on the sixth live show
Act	Order	Song	Result
The Conway Sisters	1	"One Moment in Time" (Whitney Houston)	Bottom Two
Andy Abraham	2	"Me and Mrs. Jones" (Billy Paul)	Safe
Nicholas Dorsett	3	"If I Ever Fall in Love" (East 17)	Eliminated
Journey South	4	"Angels" (Robbie Williams)	Safe
Brenda Edwards	5	"Last Dance" (Donna Summer)	Safe
Shayne Ward	6	"A Million Love Songs" (Take That)	Safe
Chico Slimani	7	"It's Chico Time" (original song)	Safe

Judges' votes to eliminate

- Walsh: The Conway Sisters – gave no reason, though effectively backed his own act, Nicholas Dorsett.
- Cowell: Nicholas Dorsett – backed his own act, The Conway Sisters.
- Osbourne: Nicholas Dorsett – gave no reason.

However, voting statistics revealed that Dorsett received more votes than The Conway Sisters which meant that if the result had reverted back to the public vote, The Conway Sisters would have been eliminated.

==== Week 7 (26 November) ====
- Best bits song: "You Raise Me Up"

Acts' performances on the seventh live show
Act	Order	Song	Result
Chico Slimani	1	"Billie Jean" (Michael Jackson)	Bottom Two
The Conway Sisters	2	"Nothing's Gonna Stop Us Now" (Starship)	Eliminated
Andy Abraham	3	"I Have Nothing" (Whitney Houston)	Safe (Highest Votes)
Shayne Ward	4	"I Believe in a Thing Called Love" (The Darkness)	Safe
Brenda Edwards	5	"I Will Always Love You" (Whitney Houston)	Safe
Journey South	6	"I Still Haven't Found What I'm Looking For" (U2)	Safe

Judges' votes to eliminate

- Osbourne: The Conway Sisters – gave no reason, though effectively backed her own act, Chico Slimani.
- Cowell: The Conway Sisters – said that both acts deserved to be in the bottom two, but felt Slimani had an entertainment value and voted to eliminate The Conway Sisters despite them being his own act. This became the first time ever in the history of the show that a mentor decided to eliminate his own act over the act from another category.
- Walsh was not required to vote as there was already a majority.

==== Week 8: Quarter-Final (3 December) ====
- Best bits song: "Hero"

Acts' performances in the quarter-final
Act	Order	First song	Order	Second song	Result
Journey South	1	"Bad Day" (Daniel Powter)	6	"Candle in the Wind" (Elton John)	Safe
Chico Slimani	2	"I Got You (I Feel Good)" (James Brown)	7	"Time Warp" (from The Rocky Horror Show)	Eliminated
Brenda Edwards	3	"I'm Outta Love" (Anastacia)	8	"I'll Never Love This Way Again" (Dionne Warwick)	Safe
Shayne Ward	4	"Take Your Mama" (Scissor Sisters)	9	"Careless Whisper" (George Michael)	Safe
Andy Abraham	5	"Easy Lover" (Phil Collins)	10	"When I Fall in Love" (Nat King Cole)	Safe

The quarter-final did not feature a final showdown and instead the act with the fewest public votes, Chico Slimani, was automatically eliminated. After his elimination, Slimani reprised his performance of "Time Warp" as his exit song.

==== Week 9: Semi-Final (10 December) ====
- Best bits song: "Don't Let the Sun Go Down on Me"

Acts' performances in the semi-final
Act	Order	First song	Order	Second song	Result
Andy Abraham	1	"(Everything I Do) I Do It for You" (Bryan Adams)	5	"Lately" (Stevie Wonder)	Safe
Journey South	2	"You're in My Heart (The Final Acclaim)" (Rod Stewart)	6	"Let It Be" (The Beatles)	Safe
Brenda Edwards	3	"Respect" (Aretha Franklin)	7	"Without You" (Mariah Carey)	Eliminated
Shayne Ward	4	"If Tomorrow Never Comes" (Ronan Keating)	8	"Unchained Melody" (Todd Duncan)	Safe

The semi-final did not feature a final showdown and instead the act with the fewest public votes, Brenda Edwards, was automatically eliminated. After her elimination, Edwards reprised her performance of "Without You" as her exit song.

==== Week 10: Final (17 December) ====
- Themes: No theme; Christmas songs; song of the series; winner's single
- Musical guest: Auditionees ("My Way")
- Finalists Best bits songs: "One", "Greatest Love of All" & "Your Song"

Acts' performances in the final
Act	Order	First song	Order	Second song	Order	Third song	Order	Fourth song	Result
Journey South	1	"Don't Let the Sun Go Down on Me" (Elton John)	4	"Happy Xmas (War Is Over)" (John Lennon)	7	"Let It Be" (live show 9)	N/A	N/A (already eliminated)	Eliminated
Andy Abraham	2	"When a Man Loves a Woman" (Percy Sledge)	5	"O Holy Night" (Traditional)	8	"Me and Mrs. Jones" (live show 6)	10	"That's My Goal"	Runner-Up
Shayne Ward	3	"If You're Not the One" (live show 2)	6	"When a Child Is Born" (Johnny Mathis)	9	"Over the Rainbow" (Judy Garland)	11	"That's My Goal"	Winner

== Reception ==
=== Ratings ===
Episode	Air date	Official ITV1 rating	Weekly rank
Auditions 1	20 August	6.72	20
Auditions 2	27 August	7.48	14
Auditions 3	3 September	7.75	13
Auditions 4	10 September	7.29	19
Auditions 5	17 September	9.79	7
Auditions 6	24 September	10.04	10
Bootcamp 1	1 October	8.93	13
Bootcamp 2	1 October	8.96	12
Judges' houses 1	8 October	9.09	14
Judges' houses 2	8 October	9.96	10
Live show 1	15 October	7.87	19
Live results 1	15 October	8.96	15
Live show 2	22 October	8.47	16
Live results 2	22 October	9.02	12
Live show 3	29 October	8.60	13
Live results 3	29 October	9.52	10
Live show 4	5 November	7.76	18
Live results 4	5 November	7.51	19
Live show 5	12 November	9.09	15
Live results 5	12 November	8.99	17
Live show 6	19 November	8.95	19
Live results 6	19 November	8.76	20
Live show 7	26 November	8.45	25
Live results 7	26 November	9.13	18
Live show 8	3 December	10.00	12
Live results 8	3 December	8.95	22
Live show 9	10 December	7.80	22
Live results 9	10 December	8.48	20
Live final	17 December	9.65	13
Live final results	17 December	9.90	11
Series average	2005	8.73	—N/a

== Controversies ==
=== Elimination of Maria Lawson and "Irish Mafia" ===
After the final showdown in week 5, controversy was created around the judges' voting process when Walsh cast the deciding vote to keep The Conway Sisters, who are Irish, in the show at the expense of Maria Lawson. Osbourne later claimed that Lawson was the victim of the "Irish Mafia" after Walsh chose to keep The Conway Sisters in. When the voting statistics were revealed at the end of the series, Lawson was revealed to have received twice as many public votes as The Conway Sisters. Osbourne's "Irish Mafia" remark resulted in an investigation by media regulator Ofcom over Osbourne's "Irish Mafia" remark, however on 9 January 2006, Ofcom cleared Osbourne of any wrongdoing.

=== Louis Walsh ===
Rumours later circulated that Walsh had quit the show after being humiliated and "bullied" by Osbourne and Cowell. In addition to the media outrage at his choice to eliminate Lawson, there were verbal assaults. Furthermore, on 19 November, during the sixth live show of the series, Osbourne threw water over Walsh live on air after he asked her, "Are you on drugs? Are you taking Ozzy's drugs?" at the start of her (positive) critique of Journey South's performance of Robbie Williams' 1997 hit single "Angels". Cowell apparently "begged" Walsh to come back and, in the event, Walsh did turn up for the next show; it was stated that he had indeed quit midweek but had been persuaded to return. He explained how he had felt he could not take the pressure any more, and denied that the episode was a publicity stunt.
