= List of The X Factor (British TV series) finalists =

The X Factor is a British television music competition that first aired in 2004. As of December 2017, there have been fourteen completed series. The final round of the competition features a number of solo singers or vocal groups: nine in series 1, twelve in series 2-6 and 10, 16 in series 7, 8, 11 14, and 15, and 13 in series 9, 12 and 13. A total of 184 acts have reached the live shows of their series.

During the first three series, the contestants were split into three groups: "16-24s", "25-and-overs" (renamed "over 25s" in series 2, though still often referred to as "25-and-overs" in series 2 and 3) and "groups". Each set of contestants was mentored by one of the show's judges, Simon Cowell (head judge), Sharon Osbourne and Louis Walsh. From series 4 onwards, the 16-24s were subdivided into boys and girls categories as a fourth judge, Dannii Minogue, joined the show, making four categories in total (Boys, Girls, Over 25s, Groups). Following Osbourne's exit from the show after series 4, Cheryl replaced her. In series 7, the over 25s were changed to over 28s, before being changed back to over 25s for series 8. Also in series 8, Cowell, Minogue and Cheryl all left the show, leaving Walsh as the only judge to return from the previous year. He was joined on the panel by Gary Barlow (head judge), Kelly Rowland and Tulisa. For series 9, Rowland left the show and Nicole Scherzinger joined the panel as her replacement. The over 25s were changed to over 28s again in series 9, and then back to over 25s in series 10. Osbourne also returned to the panel in series 10, replacing Tulisa. The over 25s were changed to over 26s in series 11. Cowell and Cheryl returned for series 11, replacing Barlow and Osbourne. Mel B joined the panel in series 11, replacing Scherzinger. Rita Ora and Nick Grimshaw joined the panel in series 12, replacing Mel B and Walsh. The over 26s were changed to over 27s in series 12, and then back to over 25s in series 13. Walsh, Scherzinger and Osbourne returned to the panel in series 13, replacing Grimshaw, Ora and Cheryl. The over 25s were changed to over 28s in series 14, and then to over 29s in series 15. Only Cowell returned to the panel for series 15, where was he was joined by Robbie Williams, Ayda Field and Louis Tomlinson, who replaced Walsh, Osbourne and Scherzinger, respectively.

As of series 14, all five categories have won the show on at least one occasion, while seven of the show's nine judges have had the winning act in their category at least once, with Cowell winning four times, Cheryl, Minogue and Scherzinger winning twice, and Walsh, Tulisa, Osbourne, Ora and Tomlinson winning once. The only judges not to win were Rowland, Barlow, Mel B, Grimshaw, Field and Williams, with Field and Williams' best performance having their contestant been the twelfth eliminated and their contestant been the fourteenth eliminated respectively in 2018 (their only series), Rowland, Mel B and Grimshaw's best performance having their contestant been the last eliminated in 2011, 2014 and 2015 respectively (their only series) and Barlow placing runner-up in 2011 (the first of his three years on the panel). Osbourne failed to win the show in her initial stint, but won on her return in series 10.

== Contestants ==
– Winner
– Runner-Up

Name	Series	Category	Mentor	Finished
2 Shoes	8	Groups	Tulisa	14th (joint)
2 to Go	1	Groups	Louis Walsh	7th
4Sure	3	Groups	Louis Walsh	11th
4th Impact	12	Groups	Cheryl	5th
4Tune	2	Groups	Simon Cowell	11th
5 After Midnight	13	Groups	Louis Walsh	3rd
Saara Aalto	13	Over 25s	Sharon Osbourne	2nd
Andy Abraham	2	Over 25s	Sharon Osbourne	2nd
Acacia & Aaliyah	15	Groups	Robbie Williams	4th
Addictiv Ladies	2	Groups	Simon Cowell	12th
Rachel Adedeji	6	Girls	Dannii Minogue	9th
John Adeleye	7	Over 28s	Louis Walsh	12th
Paul Akister	11	Boys	Mel B	9th
Shan Ako	15	Girls	Simon Cowell	7th
Alien Uncovered	12	Groups	Cheryl	12th
Robert Allen	3	Over 25s	Sharon Osbourne	6th
Abi Alton	10	Girls	Nicole Scherzinger	8th
Nikitta Angus	3	16-24s	Simon Cowell	7th
Jamie Archer	6	Over 25s	Simon Cowell	7th
James Arthur	9	Boys	Nicole Scherzinger	1st
Misha B	8	Girls	Kelly Rowland	4th
Bad Lashes	5	Groups	Louis Walsh	12th
Sam Bailey	10	Over 25s	Sharon Osbourne	1st
Hannah Barrett	10	Girls	Nicole Scherzinger	6th
Belle Amie	7	Groups	Simon Cowell	11th
Alisha Bennett	4	Girls	Sharon Osbourne	7th
Sam Black	14	Boys	Louis Walsh	10th
Blonde Electra	11	Groups	Louis Walsh	16th
Alisah Bonaobra	14	Girls	Sharon Osbourne	11th
Bratavio	13	Groups	Louis Walsh	12th
Sami Brookes	8	Over 25s	Louis Walsh	12th
Brooks Way	13	Groups	Louis Walsh	13th (withdrew)
Steve Brookstein	1	Over 25s	Simon Cowell	1st
Kitty Brucknell	8	Over 25s	Louis Walsh	7th
Scott Bruton	5	Boys	Simon Cowell	10th
Bupsi	12	Over 27s	Simon Cowell	13th
Alexandra Burke	5	Girls	Cheryl	1st
Mary Byrne	7	Over 28s	Louis Walsh	5th
Relley C	13	Over 25s	Sharon Osbourne	10th
Tabby Callaghan	1	16-24s	Sharon Osbourne	3rd
Sam Callahan	10	Boys	Louis Walsh	7th
Matt Cardle	7	Boys	Dannii Minogue	1st
Ché Chesterman	12	Boys	Nick Grimshaw	3rd
Rylan Clark	9	Boys	Nicole Scherzinger	5th
Frankie Cocozza	8	Boys	Gary Barlow	8th (removed)
Treyc Cohen	7	Girls	Cheryl	10th
Marcus Collins	8	Boys	Gary Barlow	2nd
Craig Colton	8	Boys	Gary Barlow	6th
Cassie Compton	1	16-24s	Sharon Osbourne	5th
The Conway Sisters	2	Groups	Simon Cowell	6th
The Cutkelvins	14	Groups	Simon Cowell	5th
Lloyd Daniels	6	Boys	Cheryl	5th
Grace Davies	14	Girls	Sharon Osbourne	2nd
Daniel de Bourg	4	Over 25s	Louis Walsh	11th
Talia Dean	14	Over 28s	Nicole Scherzinger	15th
Janet Devlin	8	Girls	Kelly Rowland	5th
District3	9	Groups	Louis Walsh	7th
Diva Fever	7	Groups	Simon Cowell	13th
Nicholas Dorsett	2	16-24s	Louis Walsh	7th
Jahméne Douglas	9	Boys	Nicole Scherzinger	2nd
Austin Drage	5	Boys	Simon Cowell	9th
Fleur East	11	Over 26s	Simon Cowell	2nd
Brenda Edwards	2	Over 25s	Sharon Osbourne	4th
Jade Ellis	9	Girls	Tulisa	10th
Eton Road	3	Groups	Louis Walsh	5th
Daniel Evans	5	Over 25s	Dannii Minogue	7th
Niki Evans	4	Over 25s	Louis Walsh	4th
Andrea Faustini	11	Boys	Mel B	3rd
Rebecca Ferguson	7	Girls	Cheryl	2nd
Nicolo Festa	7	Boys	Dannii Minogue	16th
Tamera Foster	10	Girls	Nicole Scherzinger	5th
Four of Diamonds	13	Groups	Louis Walsh	8th
Luke Friend	10	Boys	Louis Walsh	3rd
Futureproof	4	Groups	Simon Cowell	9th
F.Y.D.	7	Groups	Simon Cowell	15th
Honey G	13	Over 25s	Sharon Osbourne	5th
G4	1	Groups	Louis Walsh	2nd
Girlband	5	Groups	Louis Walsh	11th
Aiden Grimshaw	7	Boys	Dannii Minogue	9th
Sophie Habibis	8	Girls	Kelly Rowland	11th
Ben Haenow	11	Over 26s	Simon Cowell	1st
Dalton Harris	15	Boys	Louis Tomlinson	1st
Ella Henderson	9	Girls	Tulisa	6th
Hope	4	Groups	Simon Cowell	5th
Roberta Howett	1	16-24s	Sharon Osbourne	9th
Rachel Hylton	5	Over 25s	Dannii Minogue	6th
Jack & Joel	14	Groups	Simon Cowell	12th
Leon Jackson	4	Boys	Dannii Minogue	1st
Jay James	11	Over 26s	Simon Cowell	8th
Chloe Jasmine	11	Girls	Cheryl	13th
Tracy Leanne Jefford	14	Over 28s	Nicole Scherzinger	13th
JLS	5	Groups	Louis Walsh	2nd
John & Edward	6	Groups	Louis Walsh	6th
Danyl Johnson	6	Over 25s	Simon Cowell	4th
Louisa Johnson	12	Girls	Rita Ora	1st
Lucie Jones	6	Girls	Dannii Minogue	8th
Journey South	2	Groups	Simon Cowell	3rd
Kandy Rain	6	Groups	Louis Walsh	12th
Verity Keays	1	Over 25s	Simon Cowell	8th
Jonjo Kerr	8	Over 25s	Louis Walsh	14th (joint)
Kingsland Road	10	Groups	Gary Barlow	9th
Sam Lavery	13	Girls	Simon Cowell	7th
Ryan Lawrie	13	Boys	Nicole Scherzinger	6th
Maria Lawson	2	Over 25s	Sharon Osbourne	8th
Scarlett Lee	15	Girls	Simon Cowell	2nd
Storm Lee	7	Over 28s	Louis Walsh	14th
Leona Lewis	3	16-24s	Simon Cowell	1st
Amelia Lily	8	Girls	Kelly Rowland	3rd
Matt Linnen	14	Over 28s	Nicole Scherzinger	6th
Little Mix (née Rhythmix)	8	Groups	Tulisa	1st
Cher Lloyd	7	Girls	Cheryl	4th
LMA Choir	15	Groups	Robbie Williams	13th
Rikki Loney	6	Boys	Cheryl	11th
Ruth Lorenzo	5	Over 25s	Dannii Minogue	5th
Gifty Louise	13	Girls	Simon Cowell	9th
The MacDonald Brothers	3	Groups	Louis Walsh	4th
Lloyd Macey	14	Boys	Louis Walsh	4th
Phillip Magee	2	16-24s	Louis Walsh	10th
Leon Mallett	14	Boys	Louis Walsh	14th
Christopher Maloney	9	Over 28s	Gary Barlow	3rd
Armstrong Martins	15	Boys	Louis Tomlinson	15th
Melanie Masson	9	Over 28s	Gary Barlow	12th
Nicholas McDonald	10	Boys	Louis Walsh	2nd
Joe McElderry	6	Boys	Cheryl	1st
Kerry McGregor	3	Over 25s	Sharon Osbourne	9th
Ashley McKenzie	3	16-24s	Simon Cowell	8th
James Michael	8	Boys	Gary Barlow	14th (joint)
Monica Michael	12	Girls	Rita Ora	8th
Emily Middlemas	13	Girls	Simon Cowell	4th
Ben Mills	3	Over 25s	Sharon Osbourne	3rd
Miss Dynamix	10	Groups	Gary Barlow	10th
Miss Frank	6	Groups	Louis Walsh	10th
Misunderstood	15	Groups	Robbie Williams	10th
Dionne Mitchell	3	Over 25s	Sharon Osbourne	10th
MK1	9	Groups	Louis Walsh	11th
Seann Miley Moore	12	Boys	Nick Grimshaw	10th
Brendan Murray	15	Boys	Louis Tomlinson	5th
Lauren Murray	12	Girls	Rita Ora	4th
Olly Murs	6	Over 25s	Simon Cowell	2nd
Emily Nakanda	4	Girls	Sharon Osbourne	10th (withdrew)
Stephanie Nala	11	Girls	Cheryl	14th
Mason Noise	12	Boys	Nick Grimshaw	7th
Nu Vibe	8	Groups	Tulisa	13th
One Direction	7	Groups	Simon Cowell	3rd
Only The Young	11	Groups	Louis Walsh	7th
Overload Generation	11	Groups	Louis Walsh	15th
Freddy Parker	13	Boys	Nicole Scherzinger	11th
Bella Penfold	15	Girls	Simon Cowell	8th
Lauren Platt	11	Girls	Cheryl	4th
Carolynne Poole	9	Over 28s	Gary Barlow	13th
Jake Quickenden	11	Boys	Mel B	12th
Eoghan Quigg	5	Boys	Simon Cowell	3rd
Ray Quinn	3	16-24s	Simon Cowell	2nd
Rak-Su	14	Groups	Simon Cowell	1st
Reggie 'n' Bollie	12	Groups	Cheryl	2nd
Paije Richardson	7	Boys	Dannii Minogue	8th
The Risk	8	Groups	Tulisa	10th
Stevi Ritchie	11	Over 26s	Simon Cowell	6th
Rhydian Roberts	4	Boys	Dannii Minogue	2nd
Janice Robinson	15	Over 29s	Ayda Field	14th
Johnny Robinson	8	Over 25s	Louis Walsh	9th
Rough Copy	10	Groups	Gary Barlow	4th
Anthony Russell	15	Boys	Louis Tomlinson	3rd
Same Difference	4	Groups	Simon Cowell	3rd
Rowetta Satchell	1	Over 25s	Simon Cowell	4th
Lola Saunders	11	Girls	Cheryl	10th
Molly Scott	15	Girls	Simon Cowell	11th
Sean & Conor Price	14	Groups	Simon Cowell	9th
Lorna Simpson	10	Over 25s	Sharon Osbourne	12th
Chico Slimani	2	Over 25s	Sharon Osbourne	5th
Shelley Smith	10	Over 25s	Sharon Osbourne	11th
Stacey Solomon	6	Girls	Dannii Minogue	3rd
Kye Sones	9	Over 28s	Gary Barlow	8th
Kimberley Southwick	4	Girls	Sharon Osbourne	12th
Giovanni Spano	15	Over 29s	Ayda Field	9th
Lucy Spraggan	9	Girls	Tulisa	9th (withdrew)
Anton Stephans	12	Over 27s	Simon Cowell	6th
Stereo Kicks	11	Groups	Louis Walsh	5th
Max Stone	12	Over 27s	Simon Cowell	9th
Spencer Sutherland	14	Boys	Louis Walsh	16th
Holly Tandy	14	Girls	Sharon Osbourne	7th
Matt Terry	13	Boys	Nicole Scherzinger	1st
Danny Tetley	15	Over 29s	Ayda Field	6th
Beverley Trotman	4	Over 25s	Louis Walsh	6th
The Unconventionals	3	Groups	Louis Walsh	12th
Union J	9	Groups	Louis Walsh	4th
United Vibe	15	Groups	Robbie Williams	12th
Diana Vickers	5	Girls	Cheryl	4th
Voices with Soul	1	Groups	Louis Walsh	6th
Wagner	7	Over 28s	Louis Walsh	6th
Katie Waissel	7	Girls	Cheryl	7th
Jack Walton	11	Boys	Mel B	11th
Shayne Ward	2	16-24s	Louis Walsh	1st
Kiera Weathers	12	Girls	Rita Ora	11th
Kevin Davy White	14	Over 28s	Nicole Scherzinger	3rd
Laura White	5	Girls	Cheryl	8th
Andy Williams	4	Boys	Dannii Minogue	8th
Rai-Elle Williams	14	Girls	Sharon Osbourne	8th
Olatunji Yearwood	15	Over 29s	Ayda Field	16th
Chenai Zinyuku	2	16-24s	Louis Walsh	9th

- On four occasions, contestants have left the show under different circumstances than regular elimination. In series 4, Emily Nakanda withdrew from the show. In series 8, Frankie Cocozza was removed from the show after breaking a "golden rule" of the show. In the ninth series, Lucy Spraggan withdrew in week 5 of the live shows due to illness, after not performing in week 4, and not having had a full rehearsal session for week 5. Brooks Way withdrew from series 13 by mutual agreement after being absent from the first live show, due to events in the personal life of one of the band's members.
- Little Mix were originally known on the show as "Rhythmix" until they changed their name following pressure from a children's charity with the same name.
- In 2011, four contestants were eliminated from the show following the first live show by the judges, without facing a public vote, so should be listed as finishing joint 13th. However, following the removal of Cocozza 5 weeks later, the public were given the opportunity to vote for one of the four contestants to return. With 48% of votes cast, Amelia Lily was reinstated to the show. As a result, 2 Shoes, Jonjo Kerr, and James Michael are classed as joint 14th with Lily going on to finish in third place.
