= Dalton Harris =

Jamaican singer

- Born: 29 December 1993 (age 32); Clarendon Parish, Jamaica
- Genres: R&B; pop; reggae; dancehall
- Occupation: Singer
- Instrument: Vocals
- Years active: 2009–present
- Label: Syco

Dalton Harris (born 29 December 1993) is a Jamaican singer. In 2010, he won Digicel Rising Star, and subsequently signed with VP Records. In 2018, he won the final series of The X Factor in the United Kingdom.

== Early and personal life ==
Harris was born in Clarendon, Jamaica, before moving to Kingston to pursue his music career. Harris recalled living a difficult life growing up in Jamaica with a large family with 22 siblings, being poor, and living on his own since the age of 15. He also talked about being physically and mentally abused in his early life. Harris attended Kingston College, where he passed six CSEC subjects. In October 2020, Harris stated that he is pansexual.

== Career ==
In 2010, Harris became the youngest winner of the Jamaican singing competition Digicel Rising Stars where he won a cash prize of $1.5 million JMD. After his win, he began releasing music in Jamaica. He then traveled across the States for five years to widen his scope. He released many tracks like "I'm Numb", "Watch Over Me" and "That Wonderful Sound" in 2015, "All I Need", "Whisper in the Wind", "Unfaithful Chronicles" and "Dem Kinda Woman" in 2016 and "Perilous Time" in 2017. In 2018, he released the joint album Unintentional Astronaut with Mike Needler.

In 2018, Harris entered season 15 of The X Factor in the United Kingdom. He auditioned for the series with "Sorry Seems to Be the Hardest Word" by Elton John. He received four yeses from the four judges Robbie Williams, Ayda Field, Louis Tomlinson and Simon Cowell. Competing in the category of "Boys", he was coached by Tomlinson. Owing the success and increasing popularity of the Jamaican act, the British X Factor was broadcast in Jamaica after the local Television Jamaica (TVJ) bought the rights of broadcasting the programme live in Jamaica. On the six-chair challenge, Harris was the last contestant to perform, singing "Purple Rain" by Prince. He performed "I'm Feeling Good" in the semi-final and "Clown" from Emeli Sandé. Harris was consistently the favorite to win the show. He reached the final of the contest on 1 December 2018 alongside Anthony Russell and Scarlett Lee. In the final, he sang "A Song for You" from Leon Russell, and dueted "Beneath Your Beautiful" with Emeli Sande. His winner's single was "The Power of Love", performed as a duet with James Arthur, who won the ninth series of The X Factor in 2012.

The X Factor performances and results
Show	Song choice	Theme	Result
Auditions	"Sorry Seems to Be the Hardest Word" – Elton John	—N/a	Through to six-chair challenge
Six-chair challenge	"Purple Rain" – Prince	—N/a	Through to judges' houses
Judges' houses	"Listen" – Beyoncé	—N/a	Through to live shows
Live show 1	"Life on Mars?" – David Bowie	This is Me	Safe
Live show 2	"I Have Nothing" – Whitney Houston	Guilty Pleasures	Safe
Live show 3	"Creep" – Radiohead	Fright Night	Safe
Live show 4	"California Dreamin'" – The Mamas & the Papas	Movie Night	Safe
Quarter-Final	"Listen" – Beyoncé	Big Band	Safe
Semi-Final	"Feeling Good" – Muse	Get Me to the Final (Part I)	Safe
Semi-Final	"SOS" – ABBA	Mamma Mia	Safe
Semi-Final	"Clown" – Emeli Sandé	Get Me to the Final (Part II)	Safe
Final	"A Song for You" – Leon Russell	No theme	Winner
Final	"Beneath Your Beautiful" with Emeli Sandé	Celebrity duet	Winner
Final	"The Power of Love" with James Arthur	Winner's duet	Winner

On 15 December 2019, Harris released the song "Cry", and on its day of release, he performed the song on the Live Final of The X Factor: The Band.

In 2023, he was the subject of the documentary film Dalton's Dream.

== Discography ==
=== Singles ===
Title	Year	Peak chart positions			Album
Title	Year	UK	IRE	SCO	Album
"Finally"	2012	—	—	—	Non-album singles
"Pauper"	2014	—	—	—	Non-album singles
"The Power of Love" (featuring James Arthur)	2018	4	35	1	Non-album singles
"Cry"	2019	—	—	—	Non-album singles
"—" denotes a single that did not chart or was not released in that territory.

== Awards and nominations ==
Year	Award	Category	Nominated work	Result
2018	Talent Recap Fan Choice Awards	Favorite Talent Show Winner	The X Factor	Nominated

Awards and achievements
Preceded by Rak-Su	Winner of The X Factor; 2018	Succeeded by Megan McKenna
Preceded by Dimelo	Winner's singles of The X Factor; The Power of Love	Succeeded by It Must Have Been Love
