= The X Factor (British TV series) series 15 =

British TV competition

The X Factor
- Series 15
- Presented by: Dermot O'Leary (ITV)
- Judges: Simon Cowell; Louis Tomlinson; Ayda Field; Robbie Williams; Nile Rodgers (guest)
- Winner: Dalton Harris
- Winning mentor: Louis Tomlinson
- Runner-up: Scarlett Lee
- Finals venue: The SSE Arena, Wembley

Release
- Original network: ITV; ITV Hub (Xtra Bites)
- Original release: 1 September – 2 December 2018

Series chronology
- ← Previous; Series 14

The fifteenth and final series of the British television music competition The X Factor began airing on ITV on 1 September 2018, presented by Dermot O'Leary. Simon Cowell returned alongside new judges Louis Tomlinson, Ayda Field (credited as Ayda Williams), and Robbie Williams who replace departing judges Nicole Scherzinger, Sharon Osbourne, and Louis Walsh. Nile Rodgers filled in for Williams while he was away on his tour for weeks 3–5 of the live shows.

On 2 December, Jamaican-born singer Dalton Harris won the series making him the first and only foreign contender to win the UK show. This was the only series that featured Tomlinson, Field, and Williams as judges.

After this series, the show was put on a 'break' and in 2019 the show was replaced by a Celebrity spin-off and a Band spin-off. In 2020, it was announced that the show was still on a 'break'. However, in July 2021, it was confirmed that the show has been officially cancelled after 17 years.

== Judges and Presenters ==
Judges and Presenter for The X Factor Series 15

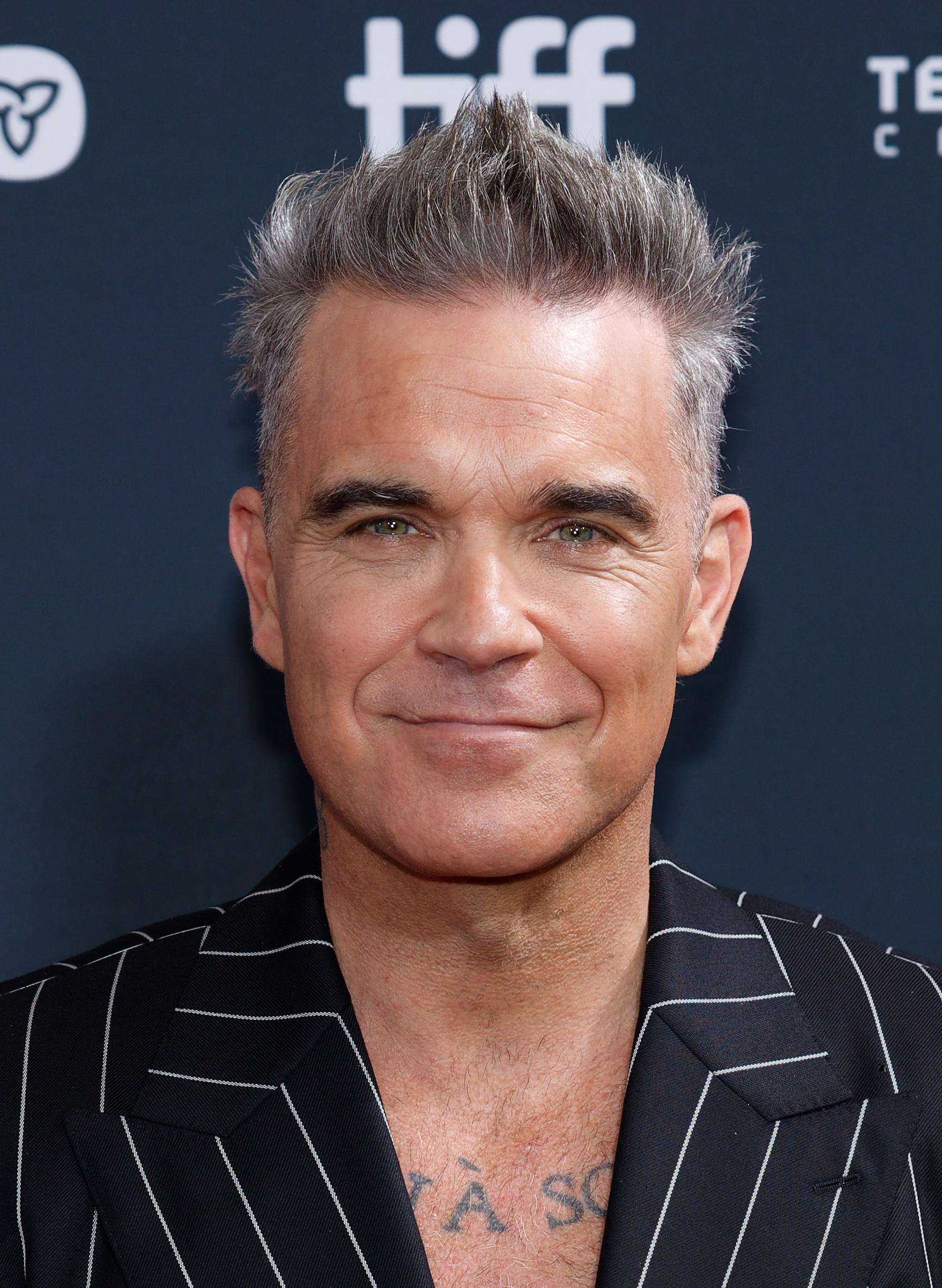
Robbie Williams

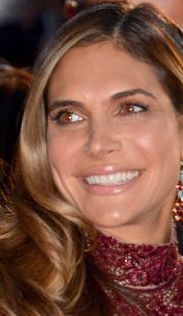
Ayda Field

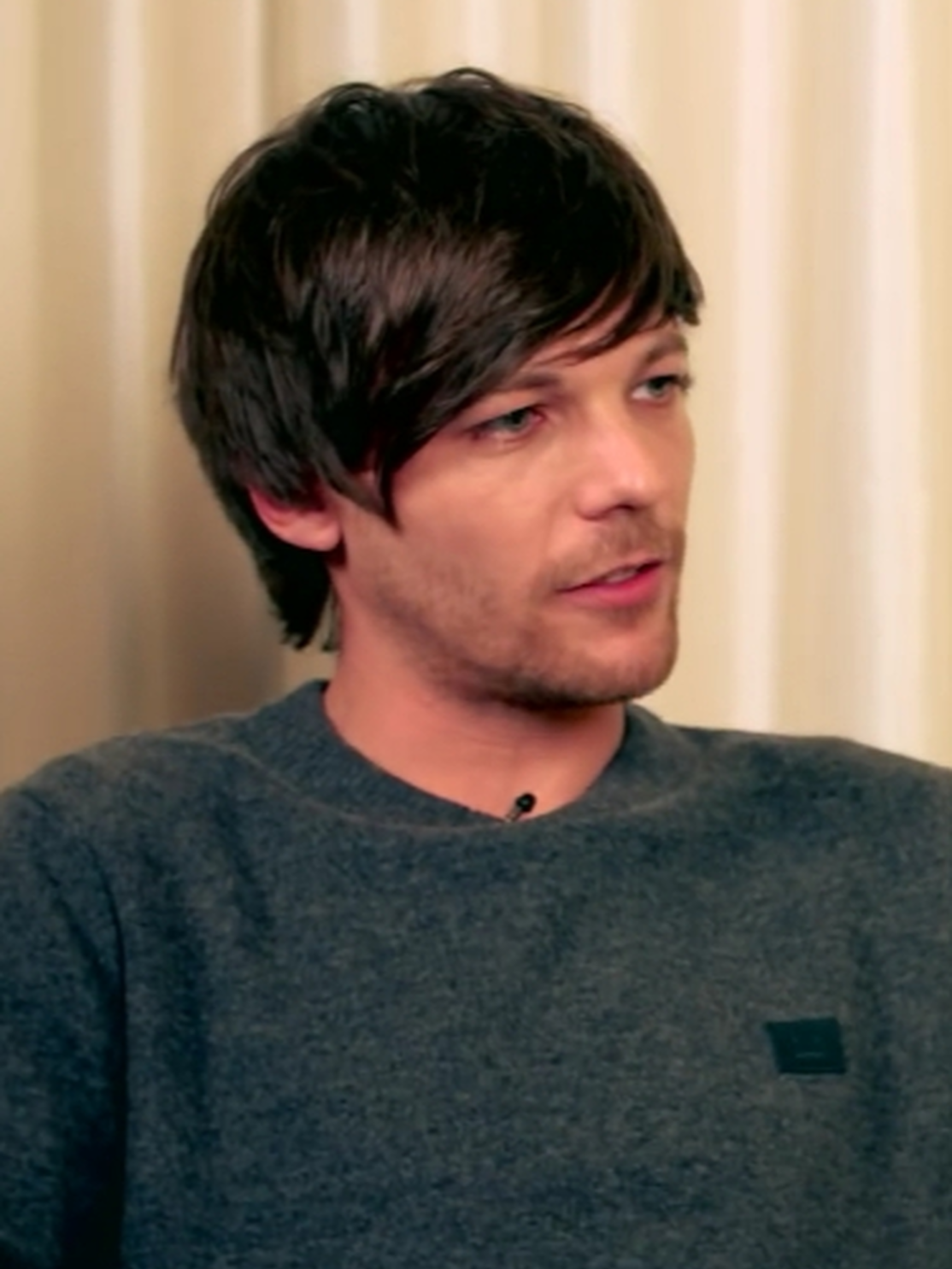
Louis Tomlinson

Simon Cowell

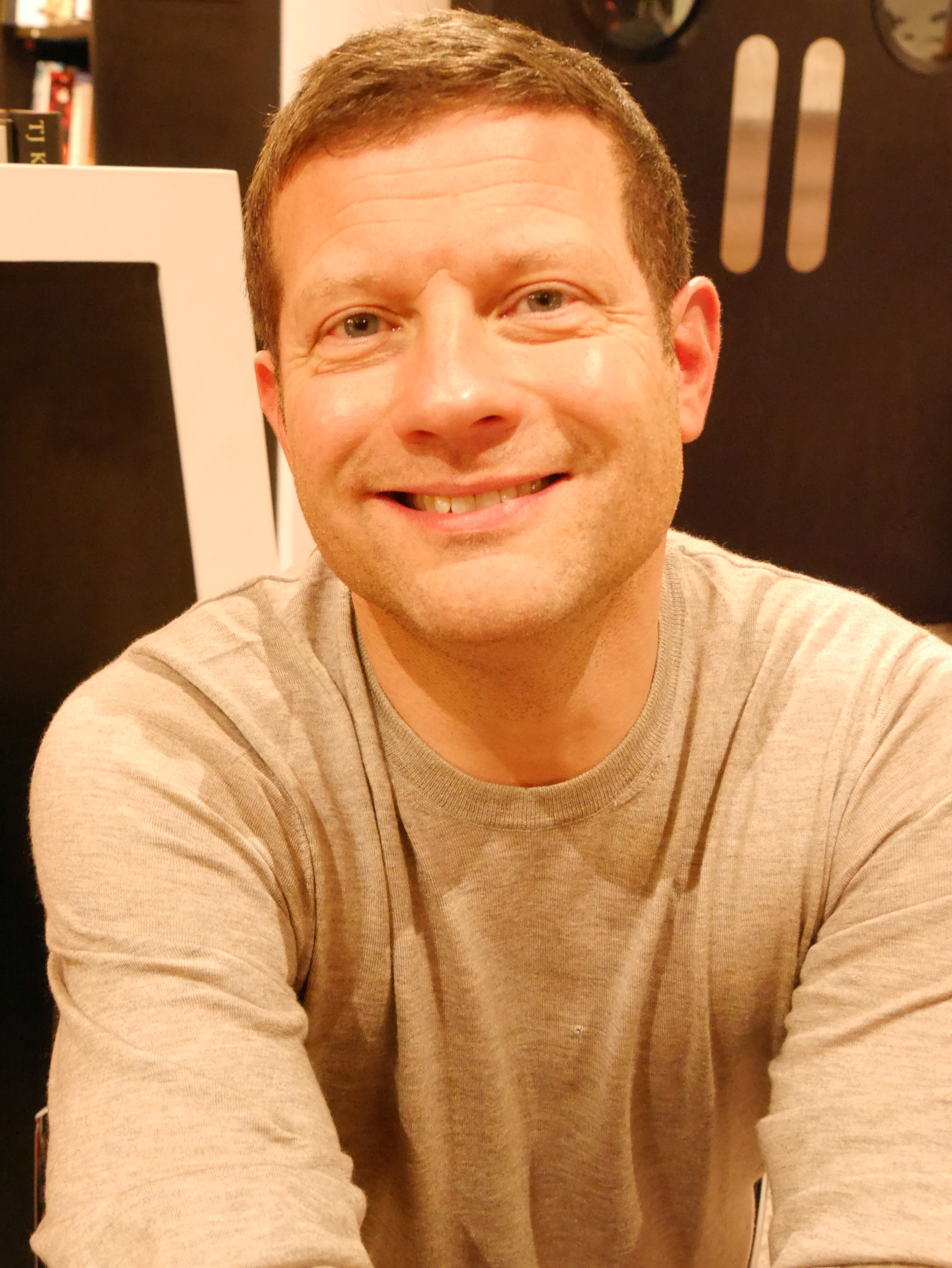
Dermot O'Leary

On 6 June 2018, it was announced that Sharon Osbourne would return to judge the fifteenth series, but only for the live shows, due to her ongoing work commitments in the United States. The next day, long-serving judge Louis Walsh announced that after thirteen years on the show, he would leave to focus on other projects. Earlier in the year, it was reported that Nicole Scherzinger would not return as a judge for the fifteenth series.

On 30 September 2018, Osbourne announced her decision to no longer appear as a judge during the live shows, stating that she had "seen the new judges finding their rhythm and are doing brilliantly".

Simon Cowell confirmed his return as head judge and Dermot O'Leary’s return as presenter. After much speculation, it was announced on 16 July 2018 that Ayda Field (credited as Ayda Williams), Robbie Williams and Louis Tomlinson would join Cowell on the series' judging panel to replace Osbourne, Walsh, and Scherzinger respectively. On 17 October 2018, British DJ Jonas Blue confirmed that he auditioned for a judge position and was ready to take part in the series until prior gig commitments caused a clash in scheduling. He was later replaced by Tomlinson.

On 23 August 2018, it was announced that Xtra Bites would return after a first series, presented by Becca Dudley again, and she would be joined by a co-host named Tinea Taylor.

On 2 November 2018, it was revealed that Nile Rodgers would fill in for Williams on the panel during some of the live shows, due to Williams' touring commitments. Rodgers sat alongside Williams on 3 November, before fully substituting for him on 4, 10, 11 & 17 November. In a statement, Rodgers stated: "I had such a great time with Louis at the Judge's House in Ibiza a couple of weeks ago that when the opportunity came to step in for Robbie I could not say ('no')", "From Chic and Sister Sledge to Duran Duran and Daft Punk, I've had great experiences with Groups in my career, so I look forward to giving them as much support as I can while Rob is away!". Williams returned to the panel on 24 November.

== Selection process ==
=== Auditions ===
Auditions for performers took place only at London's SSE Arena, Wembley, on 18–20, 22–24 and 26–28 July 2018.

=== Deliberations ===
Instead of the traditional bootcamp stages, a deliberation stage (similar to that employed by Britain's Got Talent) was introduced to cut down the number of performers at the six-chair challenge. This took place on 30 July 2018 at the Tobacco Dock in London. It was broadcast on a single episode on 23 September 2018 after the final auditions show.

After the "deliberation" and "reveal" stages, but before the start of the "six-chair challenge", the judges found out the categories they are mentoring: Tomlinson mentored the "Boys", Cowell mentored the "Girls", Field mentored the "Over 29s", and Williams mentored the "Groups".

=== Six Chair Challenge ===
The Six Chair Challenge took place over the course of three days, from 1–3 August 2018, at the SSE Arena in Wembley. A new twist was added with the introduction of a golden button, similar to Got Talent's Golden Buzzer. When this was pressed, the act in question was guaranteed a 'Safe Seat', and would go straight through to Judges' Houses. The Six Chair Challenge was aired over 3 episodes starting on 29 September 2018 and finished on 6 October 2018.

During this stage of the competition, Williams called back five soloists from the Boys category who had been rejected during the deliberations, and asked them to form a new five-piece boyband, Vibe 5 (later renamed United Vibe after judges' houses). After two American singers, Panda Ross and Burgundy Williams, had lost their seats after auditioning for Field's Overs category, Williams called them back to reaudition as a duo in the Groups category.

=== Judges' Houses ===
It was announced by O'Leary during an appearance on This Morning that the Judges' Houses would be filmed in late September 2018, Tomlinson's houses would be hosted in Ibiza; and that three of the judges' houses would be in Los Angeles (Cowell, Field and Williams). Cowell judged from Malibu, while Field and Williams each judged their categories separately from their home in Beverly Hills. The guest judges were announced to be including Cowell's American Idol colleagues Paula Abdul, Randy Jackson and Ryan Seacrest along with Diane Warren, Babyface, Tomlinson was assisted by his One Direction bandmate Liam Payne and Nile Rodgers, Series 3 winner Leona Lewis and Sinitta to assist Cowell, who hosted a house party consisting of various singers, songwriters and record producers for the Girls to perform in front of. American Idol season 8 runner-up Adam Lambert and Lewis in assisting Field, and David Walliams with Williams.

Maria Laroco was not able to secure the correct visa in time to travel to Malibu with the remaining Girls for this stage of the competition. Unlike similar instances where the affected contestants withdrew from the competition, Laroco sang to Cowell via video link from a London studio. 16 contestants were put through to the live shows at this stage, four from each category. This last-minute change was lobbied by Cowell who was unable to narrow his Girls down to just three; the other judges were then allowed one more act each for their own categories as well.

Summary of Judges' Houses
Judge	Category	Location	Assistants	Acts Eliminated
Cowell	Girls	Malibu	Paula Abdul, Randy Jackson, Ryan Seacrest, Diane Warren, Babyface, Michelle Visage, Adam Lambert, Leona Lewis, Sinitta, Paul Anka, Tricky Stewart and Dallas Austin	Georgia Burgess, Maria Laroco
Field	Over 29s	Beverly Hills	Adam Lambert and Leona Lewis	Ricky John, Louise Setara
Tomlinson	Boys	Ibiza	Liam Payne and Nile Rodgers	J-Sol, Thomas Pound
Williams	Groups	Beverly Hills	David Walliams	Panda and Burgandy, Sweet Sense

== Acts ==
Key:

– Winner
– Runner-Up
– Golden Buzzer/Safe Seat (Six-Chair Challenge)

Act	Age(s)	Hometown	Category (mentor)	Result
Dalton Harris	24	Clarendon, Jamaica	Boys (Tomlinson)	Winner
Scarlett Lee	21	Surrey	Girls (Cowell)	Runner-Up
Anthony Russell	28	Bootle	Boys (Tomlinson)	3rd Place
Acacia & Aaliyah	15 & 14	Leyland	Groups (Williams)	4th Place
Brendan Murray	21	Tuam, Republic of Ireland	Boys (Tomlinson)	5th Place
Danny Tetley	36	Wigan	Over 29s (Field)	6th Place
Shan Ako	25	Croydon	Girls (Cowell)	7th Place
Bella Penfold	19	Essex	Girls (Cowell)	8th Place
Giovanni Spano	33	West London	Over 29s (Field)	9th Place
Misunderstood	25 & 27	London	Groups (Williams)	10th Place
Molly Scott	16	County Durham	Girls (Cowell)	11th Place
United Vibe	17–20	Various	Groups (Williams)	12th Place
LMA Choir	19–40	Liverpool	Groups (Williams)	13th Place
Janice Robinson	50	Galveston, Texas, United States	Over 29s (Field)	14th Place
Armstrong Martins	23	Lagos, Nigeria/London	Boys (Tomlinson)	15th Place
Olatunji Yearwood	32	Port of Spain, Trinidad and Tobago	Over 29s (Field)	16th Place

== Live shows ==
The contestants were announced after each category performed at Judges' Houses. There were 16 contestants (4 from each category) this year. The Live Shows were broadcast for 7 weeks from 20 October to 2 December. This year the live shows reverted to the previous format of all performances on the Saturday night and the results show on the Sunday night. However, there are 16 contestants and a reduced number of live shows, so almost all of the live result shows had double eliminations.

Nile Rodgers temporarily replaced Williams on the panel, due to touring commitments. Rodgers appeared in Williams's place from 4–18 November. For the first time since 2008, there was no elimination on the Saturday (1 December 2018). Instead, all top 3 contestants progressed the Sunday (2 December 2018) live final results show.

=== Musical guests ===
Keala Settle and Rak-Su, the winners of the previous series, performed on the first live results show. Little Mix and Kylie Minogue performed on the second live results show. James Arthur and Jonas Blue, Liam Payne and Lennon Stella performed on the third live results show. Michael Bublé, Olly Murs and Lady Leshurr performed on the fourth live results show. Cheryl and Tom Walker performed on the fifth live results show. Benny Andersson and Björn Ulvaeus appeared on the sixth live show (Andersson doing a masterclass with the semi-finalists and Ulvaeus appearing on the judging panel alongside Williams, Field, Tomlinson and Cowell to judge the performances). Zara Larsson performed on the sixth live results show.

The live final featured a performance from Robbie Williams (with Take That) on the live final results show.

=== Final venue ===
Unlike the previous series where the live final was held at The ExCeL Center in London, instead this year's final was held at the normal venue which is The SSE Arena, Wembley in London.

=== Winners single ===
The winners single was the winning contestant's duet from the Sunday (2 December 2018) result show with all proceeds going to the children's charities Together for Short Lives and Shooting Star Chase. It is the eighth year running that the Chancellor of the Exchequer has waived any VAT on The X Factor's winners single. The winner was announced to be Dalton Harris who performed a duet with James Arthur on "The Power of Love".

=== Results summary ===
Colour key

Act in Boys

Act in Girls

Act in Over 29s

Act in Groups

–	Act was in the bottom two/three and had to perform again in the sing-off
–	Act was in the bottom three but received the fewest votes and was immediately eliminated
–	Act received the fewest public votes and was immediately eliminated (no sing-off)
–	Act received the most public votes

Weekly results per act
Act	Week 1	Week 2		Week 3	Week 4		Quarter-Final		Semi-Final		Final
Act	Week 1	First Vote	Second Vote	Week 3	First Vote	Second Vote	First Vote	Second Vote	Saturday Vote	Sunday Vote	Final
Dalton Harris	3rd 9.3%	1st 15.5%	2nd 15.2%	1st 15.9%	2nd 17.3%	2nd 17.8%	1st 23.8%	1st 22.8%	1st 26.9%	1st 31.4%	Winner; 41.3%
Scarlett Lee	6th 7.4%	5th 6.8%	4th 7.2%	3rd 9.5%	4th 8.9%	4th 9.3%	5th 9.4%	4th 11.3%	2nd 19.1%	3rd 22.3%	Runner-Up; 31.3%
Anthony Russell	1st 11.5%	2nd 15.4%	1st 15.6%	2nd 14.8%	1st 18.6%	1st 18.8%	2nd 19.0%	2nd 19.9%	3rd 18.9%	2nd 23.5%	3rd 28.8%
Acacia & Aaliyah	9th 6.2%	6th 6.6%	7th 6.8%	10th 6.5%	9th 7.0%	8th 8.0%	6th 8.9%	6th 9.8%	4th 12.3%	4th 14.7%	Eliminated (semi-final)
Brendan Murray	10th 4.9%	12th 4.7%	12th 4.8%	9th 6.6%	5th 8.6%	5th 8.8%	4th 9.5%	5th 10.5%	5th 11.9%	Eliminated (semi-final)	
Danny Tetley	8th 6.8%	7th 6.3%	6th 6.8%	7th 7.2%	7th 7.8%	7th 8.1%	3rd 12.8%	3rd 12.6%	6th 10.9%	Eliminated (semi-final)	
Shan Ako	2nd 10.0%	3rd 7.9%	3rd 7.9%	4th 9.2%	3rd 9.6%	3rd 9.8%	7th 8.5%	7th 8.9%	Eliminated (quarter-final)		
Bella Penfold	4th 8.5%	9th 5.3%	9th 5.6%	6th 7.2%	6th 8.1%	6th 8.5%	8th 8.1%	Eliminated (quarter-final)			
Giovanni Spano	13th 3.4%	10th 4.9%	10th 5.0%	5th 7.8%	8th 7.2%	9th 7.3%	Eliminated (week 4)				
Misunderstood	5th 8.0%	4th 6.8%	5th 7.2%	8th 7.0%	10th 6.9%	Eliminated (week 4)					
Molly Scott	7th 7.2%	8th 5.6%	8th 5.9%	11th 4.5%	Eliminated (week 3)						
United Vibe	12th 4.5%	11th 4.9%	11th 4.8%	12th 3.8%	Eliminated (week 3)						
LMA Choir	11th 4.8%	13th 4.7%	13th 4.5%	Eliminated (week 2)							
Janice Robinson	14th 3.2%	14th 4.6%	Eliminated (week 2)								
Armstrong Martins	15th 2.4%	Eliminated (week 1)									
Olatunji Yearwood	16th 1.9%	Eliminated (week 1)									
Sing-off	Martins, Robinson	No sing-off or judges' votes: results were based on public votes alone	LMA Choir, Murray	Acacia & Aaliyah, Scott	No sing-off or judges' votes: results were based on public votes alone	Acacia & Aaliyah, Spano	No sing-off or judges' votes: results were based on public votes alone	Acacia & Aaliyah, Ako	No sing-off or judges' votes: results were based on public votes alone	Acacia & Aaliyah, Lee	No sing-off or judges' votes: results were based on public votes alone
Judges voted to	Eliminate	No sing-off or judges' votes: results were based on public votes alone	Eliminate		No sing-off or judges' votes: results were based on public votes alone	Eliminate	No sing-off or judges' votes: results were based on public votes alone	Eliminate	No sing-off or judges' votes: results were based on public votes alone	Send Through	No sing-off or judges' votes: results were based on public votes alone
Rodgers' vote	—N/a	No sing-off or judges' votes: results were based on public votes alone	—N/a	Scott	No sing-off or judges' votes: results were based on public votes alone	Spano	No sing-off or judges' votes: results were based on public votes alone	Ako	No sing-off or judges' votes: results were based on public votes alone	—N/a	No sing-off or judges' votes: results were based on public votes alone
Williams' vote	Martins	No sing-off or judges' votes: results were based on public votes alone	Murray	—N/a	No sing-off or judges' votes: results were based on public votes alone	—N/a	No sing-off or judges' votes: results were based on public votes alone	—N/a	No sing-off or judges' votes: results were based on public votes alone	Acacia & Aaliyah	No sing-off or judges' votes: results were based on public votes alone
Field's vote	Martins	No sing-off or judges' votes: results were based on public votes alone	LMA Choir	Scott	No sing-off or judges' votes: results were based on public votes alone	Acacia & Aaliyah	No sing-off or judges' votes: results were based on public votes alone	Ako	No sing-off or judges' votes: results were based on public votes alone	Lee	No sing-off or judges' votes: results were based on public votes alone
Tomlinson's vote	Robinson	No sing-off or judges' votes: results were based on public votes alone	LMA Choir	Scott	No sing-off or judges' votes: results were based on public votes alone	Spano	No sing-off or judges' votes: results were based on public votes alone	Acacia & Aaliyah	No sing-off or judges' votes: results were based on public votes alone	Lee	No sing-off or judges' votes: results were based on public votes alone
Cowell's vote	Martins	No sing-off or judges' votes: results were based on public votes alone	Murray	Acacia & Aaliyah	No sing-off or judges' votes: results were based on public votes alone	Spano	No sing-off or judges' votes: results were based on public votes alone	Acacia & Aaliyah	No sing-off or judges' votes: results were based on public votes alone	Lee	No sing-off or judges' votes: results were based on public votes alone
Eliminated	Olatunji Yearwood; 1.9% to save	Janice Robinson; 4.6% to save	LMA Choir; 2 of 4 votes Deadlock	United Vibe; 3.8% to save	Misunderstood; 6.9% to save	Giovanni Spano; 3 of 4 votes Majority	Bella Penfold; 8.1% to save	Shan Ako; 2 of 4 votes Deadlock	Danny Tetley; 10.9% to save	Acacia & Aaliyah; 1 of 4 votes Minority	Anthony Russell; 27.4% to win
Eliminated	Armstrong Martins; 3 of 4 votes Majority	Janice Robinson; 4.6% to save	LMA Choir; 2 of 4 votes Deadlock	Molly Scott; 3 of 4 votes Majority	Misunderstood; 6.9% to save	Giovanni Spano; 3 of 4 votes Majority	Bella Penfold; 8.1% to save	Shan Ako; 2 of 4 votes Deadlock	Brendan Murray; 11.9% to save	Acacia & Aaliyah; 1 of 4 votes Minority	Scarlett Lee; 31.3% to win

=== Live show details ===
==== Week 1 (20/21 October) ====
- Theme: This is Me
- Musical guests: Keala Settle ("This Is Me") and Rak-Su ("I Want You to Freak")

This week's results show featured a double elimination. The three acts with the fewest votes were announced as the bottom three, and the act out of the three with the fewest public votes was then automatically eliminated. The remaining two acts then performed in the sing-off for the judges' votes.

Acts' performances on the first live show
Act	Category (mentor)	Order	Song	Result
Misunderstood	Groups (Williams)	1	"Chewing Gum" (original song)	Safe
Anthony Russell	Boys (Tomlinson)	2	"Issues"	Safe (Highest Votes)
Danny Tetley	Over 29s (Field)	3	"Hero"	Safe
Molly Scott	Girls (Cowell)	4	"Fake Love"	Safe
Janice Robinson	Over 29s (Field)	5	"Clarity"	Bottom Three
Brendan Murray	Boys (Tomlinson)	6	"Break Free"	Safe
Bella Penfold	Girls (Cowell)	7	"Beneath Your Beautiful"	Safe
Armstrong Martins	Boys (Tomlinson)	8	"Story of My Life"	Bottom Three
Giovanni Spano	Over 29s (Field)	9	"Saturday Night's Alright for Fighting"	Safe
United Vibe	Groups (Williams)	10	"Slow Hands"	Safe
Shan Ako	Girls (Cowell)	11	"Imagine"	Safe
Olatunji Yearwood	Over 29s (Field)	12	"Jiggle It" (original song)	Eliminated
Scarlett Lee	Girls (Cowell)	13	"(You Make Me Feel Like) A Natural Woman"	Safe
LMA Choir	Groups (Williams)	14	"Circle of Life"	Safe
Acacia & Aaliyah	Groups (Williams)	15	"Finesse"	Safe
Dalton Harris	Boys (Tomlinson)	16	"Life On Mars?"	Safe
Sing-off details
Janice Robinson	Over 29s (Field)	1	"The Climb"	Saved
Armstrong Martins	Boys (Tomlinson)	2	"True Colors"	Eliminated

Judges' votes to eliminate

- Field: Armstrong Martins – backed her own act, Janice Robinson, saying she deserves to be in the competition.
- Tomlinson: Janice Robinson – backed his own act, Armstrong Martins.
- Williams: Armstrong Martins – gave no reason but many fans accused Williams of backing his wife's act.
- Cowell: Armstrong Martins – said that despite Martins being more interesting, Robinson was the better singer.

==== Week 2 (27/28 October) ====
- Theme: Guilty Pleasures
- Musical guests: Little Mix ("Woman Like Me") and Kylie Minogue ("A Lifetime to Repair")

This week's results show featured a double elimination. Lines were frozen on Sunday at 7:30 pm, 30 minutes before the results show, and Janice Robinson was eliminated after the special guest performance from Little Mix after receiving the fewest votes. Lines then reopened and the two acts with the next fewest votes then performed in the sing-off.

Acts' performances on the second live show
Act	Category (mentor)	Order	Song	Guilty Pleasure	Result
LMA Choir	Groups (Williams)	1	"Proud Mary"	Tina Turner	Bottom Three
Shan Ako	Girls (Cowell)	2	"Sorry Seems to Be the Hardest Word"	Elton John	Safe
Danny Tetley	Over 29s (Field)	3	"Crazy for You"	Madonna	Safe
Brendan Murray	Boys (Tomlinson)	4	"Believe"	Cher	Bottom Three
Misunderstood	Groups (Williams)	5	"Close to You"	Maxi Priest	Safe
Molly Scott	Girls (Cowell)	6	"Little Do You Know"	Alex & Sierra	Safe
Dalton Harris	Boys (Tomlinson)	7	"I Have Nothing"	Whitney Houston	Safe
Scarlett Lee	Girls (Cowell)	8	"Always on My Mind"	Elvis Presley	Safe
Acacia & Aaliyah	Groups (Williams)	9	"All My Life"/"Shutdown"	K-Ci & JoJo / Skepta	Safe
Giovanni Spano	Over 29s (Field)	10	"...Baby One More Time"	Britney Spears	Safe
Anthony Russell	Boys (Tomlinson)	11	"I Want to Know What Love Is"	Foreigner	Safe
United Vibe	Groups (Williams)	12	"Party in the U.S.A."	Miley Cyrus	Safe
Bella Penfold	Girls (Cowell)	13	"Diamonds Are Forever"/"Diamonds from Sierra Leone"	Shirley Bassey / Kanye West	Safe
Janice Robinson	Over 29s (Field)	14	"Show Me Love"	Robin S.	Eliminated
Sing-off details
LMA Choir	Groups (Williams)	1	"A Change Is Gonna Come"		Eliminated
Brendan Murray	Boys (Tomlinson)	2	"High and Dry"		Saved

Judges' votes to eliminate

- Williams: Brendan Murray – backed his own act, LMA Choir.
- Tomlinson: LMA Choir – backed his own act, Brendan Murray.
- Cowell: Brendan Murray – gave no reason.
- Field: LMA Choir – could not decide and sent the result to deadlock.

With the acts in the sing-off receiving two votes each, the result went to deadlock and reverted to the earlier public vote. LMA Choir were eliminated as the act with the fewest public votes.

==== Week 3 (3/4 November) ====
- Theme: Fright Night
- Musical guests: James Arthur ("Empty Space") and Jonas Blue, Liam Payne & Lennon Stella ("Polaroid")

The live show was pre-recorded during Saturday afternoon to allow Williams to be present before flying to South America for touring commitments. Nile Rodgers appeared as a guest judge, filling in for Williams during the third results show and the fourth & fifth live shows and results shows.

This week's results show featured a double elimination. Lines were originally scheduled to be frozen on Sunday at 7:30 pm, 60 minutes before the results show, the act receiving the fewest votes leaving the competition at the beginning of the show before lines would reopen and the two acts with the next fewest votes would then perform in the sing-off. However, due to a technical issue that affected the sound during Danny Tetley and Anthony Russell's performances, Saturday's public vote was cancelled and lines instead opened in the results show on Sunday. At the start of the live results show, all of the performances were shown in full before the public vote opened for 14 minutes.

Acts' performances on the third live show
Act	Category (mentor)	Order	Song	Result
Molly Scott	Girls (Cowell)	1	"Toxic"	Bottom Three
Dalton Harris	Boys (Tomlinson)	2	"Creep"	Safe (Highest Votes)
United Vibe	Groups (Williams)	3	"Bleeding Love"	Eliminated
Shan Ako	Girls (Cowell)	4	"The Sound of Silence"	Safe
Danny Tetley	Over 29s (Field)	5	"Who Wants to Live Forever"	Safe
Anthony Russell	Boys (Tomlinson)	6	"Demons"	Safe
Misunderstood	Groups (Williams)	7	"Thriller"	Safe
Scarlett Lee	Girls (Cowell)	8	"I Put a Spell on You"	Safe
Acacia & Aaliyah	Groups (Williams)	9	"Jump"	Bottom Three
Bella Penfold	Girls (Cowell)	10	"In My Blood"	Safe
Brendan Murray	Boys (Tomlinson)	11	"Youngblood"	Safe
Giovanni Spano	Over 29s (Field)	12	"Live and Let Die"	Safe
Sing-off details
Acacia & Aaliyah	Groups (Williams)	1	"Big for Your Boots"	Saved
Molly Scott	Girls (Cowell)	2	"Human"	Eliminated

Judges' votes to eliminate

- Rodgers: Molly Scott – based on the sing-off performances, effectively backing Williams' own act, Acacia & Aaliyah.
- Cowell: Acacia & Aaliyah – backed his own act, Molly Scott.
- Field: Molly Scott – based on the sing-off performances.
- Tomlinson: Molly Scott – said both acts have potential but he was not sure Scott was "quite there yet".

==== Week 4 (10/11 November) ====
- Theme: "Movies" (songs from films)
- Musical guests: Michael Bublé ("When I Fall in Love") and Olly Murs featuring Lady Leshurr ("Moves")

This week's results show featured a double elimination. Lines were frozen on Sunday at 7:30 pm, 60 minutes before the results show, and Misunderstood were eliminated after the special guest performance from Bublé after receiving the fewest votes. Lines then reopened and the two acts with the next fewest votes then performed in the sing-off.

Acts' performances on the fourth live show
Act	Category (mentor)	Order	Song	Movie	Result
Giovanni Spano	Over 29s (Field)	1	"The Greatest Show"	The Greatest Showman	Bottom Three
Dalton Harris	Boys (Tomlinson)	2	"California Dreamin'"	San Andreas	Safe
Scarlett Lee	Girls (Cowell)	3	"I'll Never Love Again"	A Star is Born	Safe
Brendan Murray	Boys (Tomlinson)	4	"Everybody Hurts"	Bewitched	Safe
Acacia & Aaliyah	Groups (Williams)	5	"Survivor"	Tomb Raider	Bottom Three
Bella Penfold	Girls (Cowell)	6	"A Million Dreams"	The Greatest Showman	Safe
Misunderstood	Groups (Williams)	7	"Maniac"	Flashdance	Eliminated
Danny Tetley	Over 29s (Field)	8	"My Heart Will Go On"	Titanic	Safe
Anthony Russell	Boys (Tomlinson)	9	"Eye of the Tiger"	Rocky III	Safe (Highest Votes - First and Second Votes)
Shan Ako	Girls (Cowell)	10	"Never Enough"	The Greatest Showman	Safe
Sing-off details
Giovanni Spano	Over 29s (Field)	1	"Let Me Entertain You"		Eliminated
Acacia & Aaliyah	Groups (Williams)	2	"All My Life"/ "Shutdown"		Saved

Judges' votes to eliminate

- Rodgers: Giovanni Spano – backed Williams' own act, Acacia & Aaliyah.
- Field: Acacia & Aaliyah – backed her own act, Giovanni Spano, saying he brought fun and vital entertainment to the competition.
- Tomlinson: Giovanni Spano – believed Acacia & Aaliyah had a future as recording artists while Spano had more of a future in musical theatre.
- Cowell: Giovanni Spano – gave no specific reason but praised both acts' sing-off performances.

==== Week 5: Quarter-Final (17/18 November) ====
- Theme: Big Band
- Musical guests: Tom Walker ("Leave a Light On") and Cheryl ("Love Made Me Do It")

This week's results show featured a double elimination. Lines were frozen on Sunday at 7:30 pm, 30 minutes before the results show, and Bella Penfold was eliminated immediately at the beginning of the show. Once that occurred, lines reopened for a few more minutes and the two acts with the next fewest votes performed in the sing off.

During the results show, Cowell originally told the acts that the final six would go on The X Factor Live Tour in 2019. After the elimination of Shan Ako, Cowell stated that he would allow both her and Penfold to join the final six on tour as well, therefore the final eight would perform on the tour.

Acts' performances in the quarter-final
Act	Category (mentor)	Order	Song	Big Band Artist	Result
Scarlett Lee	Girls (Cowell)	1	"Can't Take My Eyes Off You"	Andy Williams	Safe
Brendan Murray	Boys (Tomlinson)	2	"Say Something"	A Great Big World & Christina Aguilera	Safe
Shan Ako	Girls (Cowell)	3	"Summertime"	Ella Fitzgerald	Bottom Three
Anthony Russell	Boys (Tomlinson)	4	"Beyond the Sea"	Bobby Darin	Safe
Acacia & Aaliyah	Groups (Williams)	5	"Act Our Age" (original song)	Original	Bottom Three
Bella Penfold	Girls (Cowell)	6	"Strong"	London Grammar	Eliminated
Dalton Harris	Boys (Tomlinson)	7	"Listen"	Beyoncé	Safe (Highest Votes - First and Second Votes)
Danny Tetley	Over 29s (Field)	8	"My Way"	Frank Sinatra	Safe
Sing-off details
Shan Ako	Girls (Cowell)	1	"Rise Up"		Eliminated
Acacia & Aaliyah	Groups (Williams)	2	"Bang Bang"		Saved

Judges' votes to eliminate

- Cowell: Acacia & Aaliyah – backed his own act, Shan Ako.
- Rodgers: Shan Ako – backed Williams' own act, Acacia & Aaliyah.
- Tomlinson: Acacia & Aaliyah – based on "vocal ability" without being led by his emotions.
- Field: Shan Ako – praised both acts' sing-off performances but could not decide and sent the result to deadlock, though fans accused Field of not wanting Williams to return without an act in the competition.

With the acts in the sing-off receiving two votes each, the result went to deadlock and reverted to the earlier public vote. Shan Ako was eliminated as the act with the fewest public votes.

==== Week 6: Semi-Final (24/25 November) ====
24 November

- Theme: Get Me to the Final (Part I) & Mamma Mia

This week's semi-final featured a triple elimination. During Saturday's show, the lines froze where the two acts with the fewest votes were immediately eliminated. They then re-opened and closed during Sunday's results show ahead of the final sing-off of the series.

In addition, following all of the act's first performance during Saturday's show, each act performed a segment from an ABBA song where Björn Ulvaeus joined the judging panel for the performances.

Acts' performances on the Saturday Semi-Final
Act	Category (mentor)	Order	Song To Get Into The Final (Part I)	Order	ABBA Song	Result
Brendan Murray	Boys (Tomlinson)	1	"Run"	11	"I Have a Dream"	Eliminated
Danny Tetley	Over 29s (Field)	2	"This Is My Life"	12	"Thank You for the Music"	Eliminated
Dalton Harris	Boys (Tomlinson)	3	"Feeling Good"	7	"SOS"	Safe (Highest Votes)
Acacia & Aaliyah	Groups (Williams)	4	"Blinded by Your Grace, Pt. 2"/"I Win"	10	"Money, Money, Money"	Safe
Anthony Russell	Boys (Tomlinson)	5	"Livin' on a Prayer"	8	"The Name of the Game"	Safe
Scarlett Lee	Girls (Cowell)	6	"This Is Me"	9	"The Winner Takes It All"	Safe

25 November

- Theme: Get Me to the Final (Part II)
- Musical guests: Zara Larsson ("Ruin My Life")

Acts' performances on the Sunday Semi-Final
Act	Category (mentor)	Order	Song	Result
Dalton Harris	Boys (Tomlinson)	1	"Clown"	Safe (Highest Votes)
Acacia & Aaliyah	Groups (Williams)	2	"Big for Your Boots"/"Shutdown"	Bottom Two
Anthony Russell	Boys (Tomlinson)	3	"Don't Look Back in Anger"	Safe
Scarlett Lee	Girls (Cowell)	4	"I Didn't Know My Own Strength"	Bottom Two
Sing-off details
Acacia & Aaliyah	Groups (Williams)	1	"Blinded by Your Grace, Pt. 2"/"I Win"	Eliminated
Scarlett Lee	Girls (Cowell)	2	"This Is Me"	Saved

Judges' votes to send through to the final

- Cowell: Scarlett Lee – based on the sing-off performances, and said he would have made the same choice even if Scarlett Lee was not his own act; he said without her, the final would not be the same.
- Williams: Acacia & Aaliyah – backed his own act, Acacia & Aaliyah.
- Field: Scarlett Lee – based on the sing-off performances.
- Tomlinson: Scarlett Lee – based on the vocals only in the sing-off performances.

==== Week 7: Final (1/2 December) ====
1 December

- Theme: No theme; Celebrity duets
- Group Performance: "Let Me Entertain You"/"Rock DJ"/"Freedom" (Top 10 contestants with Robbie Williams)
- Musical guests: James Arthur & Anne-Marie ("Rewrite the Stars") and George Ezra ("Shotgun")

Acts' performances on the Saturday Final
Act	Category (mentor)	Order	First Song	Order	Second Song	Duet Partner
Anthony Russell	Boys (Tomlinson)	1	"Let It Be"	4	"Leave a Light On"	Tom Walker
Dalton Harris	Boys (Tomlinson)	2	"A Song for You"	5	"Beneath Your Beautiful"	Emeli Sandé
Scarlett Lee	Girls (Cowell)	3	"Your Song"	6	"Angels"	Robbie Williams

2 December

- Theme: Winners duets
- Musical guests: Pinkfong ("Baby Shark"), Ellie Goulding ("Close To Me"), Nile Rodgers & Chic ("Le Freak"/"'Till The World Falls"/"We Are Family"/"I Want Your Love"/"Do You Wanna Party"/"Good Times"/"Rapper's Delight" with Acacia & Aaliyah and Misunderstood) and Take That ("Shine"/"Everything Changes" with Robbie Williams)

Acts' performances on the Sunday Final
Act	Category (mentor)	Order	Song	Duet Partner	Result
Anthony Russell	Boys (Tomlinson)	1	"I Predict a Riot"	Kaiser Chiefs	Eliminated
Scarlett Lee	Girls (Cowell)	2	"One More Sleep"	Leona Lewis	Runner-Up
Dalton Harris	Boys (Tomlinson)	3	"The Power of Love"	James Arthur	Winner

== Reception ==
=== Ratings ===
As of September 2018, all official ratings include those who watched on demand via the ITV Hub.

Episode	Air date	Official rating (millions inc. +1 and HD)	Weekly rank
Auditions 1	1 September	7.38	4
Auditions 2	2 September	6.27	11
Auditions 3	8 September	6.40	15
Auditions 4	9 September	6.23	18
Auditions 5	15 September	6.93	8
Auditions 6	16 September	5.89	18
Auditions 7	22 September	6.40	15
Auditions 8	23 September	6.22	18
Six-chair challenge 1	29 September	6.12	21
Six-chair challenge 2	30 September	6.25	17
Six-chair challenge 3	6 October	6.28	18
Judges Houses 1	7 October	6.07	20
Judges Houses 2	13 October	6.80	17
Judges Houses 3	14 October	6.21	22
Live show 1	20 October	5.51	24
Live results 1	21 October	4.94	29
Live show 2	27 October	5.27	24
Live results 2	28 October	4.98	27
Live show 3	3 November	4.84	33
Live results 3	4 November	4.82	34
Live show 4	10 November	5.00	26
Live results 4	11 November	4.73	30
Live show 5	17 November	4.93	31
Live results 5	18 November	5.40	22
Live show 6	24 November	5.02	33
Live results 6	25 November	5.14	32
Live final 1	1 December	4.81	35
Live final 2	2 December	6.14	26
Series average	2018	5.75	—N/a

== Controversies ==
=== Accusations of transphobia ===
During the audition stage, 20-year-old transgender man Felix Shepherd impressed the judges with his rendition of "All I Want" by Kodaline, and received a standing ovation from the crowd. Before singing, Williams asked him about his background; Shepherd said he was there to prove to people that he was "more than just a transgender guy." Williams responded by asking him: "So when you were born, what was your name?", thus misgendering him. Although many fans of the show were supportive of the representation, many were outraged by Williams' question, though Shepherd stated that he was not offended by Williams.

=== Sharon Osbourne ===
On 5 September 2018, whilst on Howard Stern's radio show, Osbourne accused Cowell of underpaying her for the new series. She used some offensive language to criticise Cowell and the show's auditionees, which led to a backlash from fans who suggested that Osbourne should be replaced. Osbourne subsequently announced her decision to not participate during the live shows.

Various sources reported that Osbourne had been fired over the interview and Stern stated that he believed she had been tipped off to keep quiet. Osbourne later refuted Stern's allegations and stated that her comments were only made in jest and were not to be taken literally, but that they were misappropriated by other people including The X Factor’s production company due to Stern wanting to give Cowell a bad reputation by using his radio show. She added that although the company wanted to fire her, Cowell was not upset with the comments and wanted her to remain on the show, but that it was ultimately her decision to step down out of fear of awkwardness between her and fellow judges Williams and Field, with whom she is close friends, though she did not rule out a return to the show in the future.

=== Sound problems ===
During the third week of live shows, sound issues caused the judges, O'Leary and contestants to sound distorted. As the show was not live, O'Leary did not address the sound problems until the following night's live results show, but at the end of the programme, another message said: "Due to a technical issue, tonight's vote has been cancelled. It will open in tomorrow night's show." During the results show all the performances of the night were replayed before the lines opened to make the vote as fair as possible for the contestants.
