= Alisah Bonaobra =

Filipino Singer

- Born: Alisah Nina Luz Salacot Bonaobra; April 22, 1995 (age 31); Manila, Philippines
- Origin: Filipino
- Genres: Pop, musical theatre
- Occupation: Singer
- Instrument: Vocals
- Years active: 2012–present

Alisah Nina Luz Salacot Bonaobra (born April 22, 1995) is a Filipino singer who participated in the second season of The Voice of the Philippines, in which she finished as runner-up. In 2016, she was a finalist in Eat Bulaga's Just Duet. In 2017, Bonaobra also competed in the fourteenth series of The X Factor been the sixth contestant eliminated.

== Early life ==
Alisah Bonaobra was born to a family that made their living through selling at the sidewalk since 1987. She participated in singing contests such as Eat Bulaga's now-defunct Gymeoke segment. She studied at St. Scholastica's College's Conservatory of Arts, although her scholarship was revoked after she was found to have participated a televised karaoke contest while wearing her school uniform; this was prohibited under the rules of the college.

== Career ==
In July 2014, Bonaobra rose to fame after a video of her performing "Let It Go" in a karaoke machine in Robinsons Place Manila was uploaded by Henrik Jensen. After the video viral online, Alisah became prominent in various singing competitions on television both locally and abroad.

=== 2014: The Voice of the Philippines ===
In November 2014, Bonaobra auditioned for the second season of The Voice of the Philippines where she got through the blind audition rounds with her performance of Jessie J's "Domino". She then chose Black Eyed Peas' apl.de.ap as her coach. During the semi-finals, Bonaobra performed "Lipad ng Pangarap" and a duet of "One Sweet Day" with Daryl Ong. As a result, she was saved from elimination and advanced to the finals. On the first day of the first round of the finals held on February 28, 2015, she performed "Ako Ang Nagwagi" with Dulce for the duets while for her solo performance, she performed Beyoncé's "Love on Top". On the second day of the first round of the finals, her solo song was "Go the Distance" while her duet song with her coach was a medley of "Hero" and "You Can Do Anything". She advanced to the second round along with Jason Dy. In the second round of the grand finals, Bonaobra performed Celine Dion's "All By Myself" but finished as runner-up after receiving 47.06% of the votes, losing to Jason Dy.

The Voice of the Philippines season 2 performances and results
Week	Theme	Song	Original Artist	Date	Result
Blind audition	—N/a	"Domino"	Jessie J	November 9, 2014	Advanced
Battle rounds	—N/a	"Unconditionally" (with Abbey Pineda)	Katy Perry	December 6, 2014	Advanced
Knockouts	—N/a	"Follow Your Dreams"	Sheryn Regis	January 17, 2015	Advanced
Live shows	—N/a	"Bituing Walang Ningning"	Sharon Cuneta	January 31, 2015	Apl's choice
Live shows	—N/a	"LaserLight"	Jessie J	February 7, 2015	Advanced
Live shows	Dedication to loved one	"Let It Go"	Demi Lovato/Idina Menzel	February 14, 2015	Advanced
Semi-finals	Personal stories	"Lipad ng Pangarap"	Regine Velasquez/Dessa	February 21, 2015	Advanced
Semi-finals	Duet with co-competitor	"One Sweet Day" (with Daryl Ong)	Mariah Carey with Boyz II Men	February 22, 2015	Advanced
Finals	Duet with guest artist	"Ako Ang Nagwagi" (with Dulce)	Dulce	February 28, 2015	Advanced
Finals	Upbeat songs	"Love On Top"	Beyoncé	February 28, 2015	Advanced
Finals	Dramatic songs	"Go the Distance"	Michael Bolton	March 1, 2015	Advanced
Finals	Duet with coach	"Hero"/"You Can Do Anything"	Mariah Carey	March 1, 2015	Advanced
Finals	Final showdown	"All By Myself"	Celine Dion	March 1, 2015	Runner-up

=== 2016: World Championship of Performing Arts ===
In July 2016, Bonaobra competed for the WCOPA (World Championship of Performing Arts) held in Long Beach, California. She was part of the senior II female 18-24 category. She performed "I Surrender" for open entry and "All By Myself" for pop entry. She won a gold medal for industry award, as well as silver medals for broadway entry ("Let It Go"), gospel entry ("The Prayer"), and variety entry ("Go the Distance")

WCOPA performances and results
Senior II Female 18-24 Category	Song Choice	Entry	Result
Senior II Female 18-24 Category	"I Surrender" - Celine Dion	Open	—N/a
Senior II Female 18-24 Category	"All By Myself" - Celine Dion	Pop	—N/a
Senior II Female 18-24 Category	"Let It Go" - Idina Menzel	Broadway	Silver Medal
Senior II Female 18-24 Category	"The Prayer" - Celine Dion and Andrea Bocelli	Gospel	Silver Medal
Senior II Female 18-24 Category	"Go the Distance" - Michael Bolton	Variety	Silver Medal
Senior II Female 18-24 Category	Industry Award		Gold Medal

=== 2017: The X Factor UK ===
In August 2017, Bonaobra auditioned for fourteenth season of The X Factor. She performed Beyonce's "Listen" during her audition in front of judges Simon Cowell, Sharon Osbourne, Nicole Scherzinger and Louis Walsh and was sent through to bootcamp.

In the first bootcamp round, she was placed in group 8 with Natalie Lomax, Gaga Lord, and Rai-Elle Williams. They performed Mariah Carey's "We Belong Together". Only Williams was initially sent through to the second bootcamp round. Bonaobra broke down in tears and as Scherzinger went to the stage to comfort her, she begged for a second chance and sang again in front of Scherzinger. Eventually, the other three judges decided to send her through to the second bootcamp round as well. In the second bootcamp round, she performed "Defying Gravity" as her solo performance, which resulted in her getting through to the six chair challenge.

In the six chair challenge, she performed Celine Dion's "All By Myself" and was given a seat by her mentor Osbourne, taking seat number 2 from Taliah Dalorto. Osbourne later decided to give her seat to Grace Davies, resulting in the audience booing Osbourne for her decision and wanting Bonaobra to return. After all performances in the Girls category, Osbourne decided to have Bonaobra compete in a sing-off with fellow contestants Scarlett Lee and Williams. Bonaobra performed "Bang Bang" by Jessie J, Ariana Grande and Nicki Minaj. At the end, Bonaobra took seat number 1 from Lee. At the Judges Houses, Bonaobra performed Sam Smith's "Lay Me Down". She was sent home by Osbourne, but later won the public wildcard vote for the Girls category, sending her through to the live shows. She performed Jordin Sparks' "This Is My Now" on her first live shows, where she received a standing ovation from the judges and the audience. On her second live shows, it was "Viva Latino" week, she performed Jennifer Lopez's "Let's Get Loud" and made it through the next week's show. The third live shows were "George Michael" week, where Bonaobra performed "Praying for Time". She received a standing ovation from judges Scherzinger and Osbourne; both praising Bonaobra for outstanding performance, with Walsh calling her "Filipina-Tigress". However, Cowell was not satisfied with the performance of the Filipina singer describing her performance as "old-fashioned" and "headlining to weddings". Bonaobra was voted off by the public making her the sixth contestant to be sent home.

The X Factor performances and results
Show	Song choice	Theme	Result
Auditions	"Listen" – Beyoncé	—N/a	Through to bootcamp round 1
Bootcamp Round 1	"We Belong Together" - Mariah Carey (with Natalie Lomax, Gaga Lord & Rai-Elle Williams)	—N/a	Through to bootcamp round 2
Bootcamp Round 2	"Defying Gravity" - Idina Menzel	—N/a	Through to six chair challenge
Six-chair challenge	“All by Myself” - Celine Dion/"Bang Bang" - Jessie J, Ariana Grande & Nicki Minaj (sing-off song against Scarlett Lee & Rai-Elle Williams)	—N/a	Through to judges houses
Judges' houses	"Lay Me Down" – Sam Smith	—N/a	Through to Live Shows 1 (Eliminated, re-instated as a wildcard)
Live show 1	“This Is My Now” - Jordin Sparks	Express Yourself	Through to Live Show 2 (4th)
Live show 2	“Let's Get Loud” - Jennifer Lopez	Viva Latino	Through to Live Show 3 (6th)
Live show 3	“Praying for Time”	George Michael	Eliminated (11th)

=== Other talent shows ===
In April 2016, Bonaobra competed for Eat Bulaga!'s Just Duet. She sang Whitney Houston's "I Have Nothing" with her celebrity partner, Maricris Garcia to reach the semi-finals. In the weekly finals, she performed Celine Dion's "Because You Loved Me" with Maricris Garcia. In the third qualifying round, she performed "Sayang Na Sayang" with Aegis. In the week-long grand finale, she performed "Love Me Like You Do" and "Defying Gravity" as her solo performances. She performed Swedish House Mafia's "Don't You Worry Child", alongside her mother named Luzviminda Bonaobra. She also performed Whitney Houston's "I Will Always Love You" with her celebrity partner, Ima Castro. In the championship, she also performed "When You Believe" with her celebrity partner, Aicelle Santos.

On February 6, 2017, Bonaobra competed in the first season of It's Showtime's Tawag ng Tanghalan with Roland "Bunot" Abante and Raul Tubil. She performed Ted Ito's "Maghintay Ka Lamang" in the daily round. She was eliminated in favour of Abante.
