= The X Factor (British TV series) series 14 =

2017 season of British TV competition

The X Factor
- Series 14
- Hosted by: Dermot O'Leary
- Judges: Simon Cowell; Nicole Scherzinger; Sharon Osbourne; Louis Walsh; Alesha Dixon (guest)
- Winner: Rak-Su
- Winning mentor: Simon Cowell
- Runner-up: Grace Davies
- Finals venue: ExCeL London

Release
- Original network: ITV; ITV Hub (Xtra Bites)
- Original release: 2 September – 3 December 2017

Series chronology
- ← Previous; Series 13 Next → Series 15

The X Factor is a British television music competition to find new singing talent. The fourteenth series began airing on ITV on 2 September 2017, presented by Dermot O'Leary. For the first time in seven years, the judging panel remained the same as the previous series, with Nicole Scherzinger, Simon Cowell, Sharon Osbourne and Louis Walsh returning. This is the first series not to include companion show The Xtra Factor, after it was cancelled in January 2017. Its replacement is a programme called Xtra Bites presented by Becca Dudley on the ITV Hub. This is also the first series to be sponsored by Just Eat, with the show having been sponsored by TalkTalk since 2009, as well as the second time the show has premiered in September, rather than August, since the first series in 2004. Rak-Su won the competition on 3 December 2017 and they became the second group to win the competition and Simon Cowell became the winning mentor for the fourth time.

== Judges and Presenter ==
Judges and Presenter(s) for The X Factor Series 14

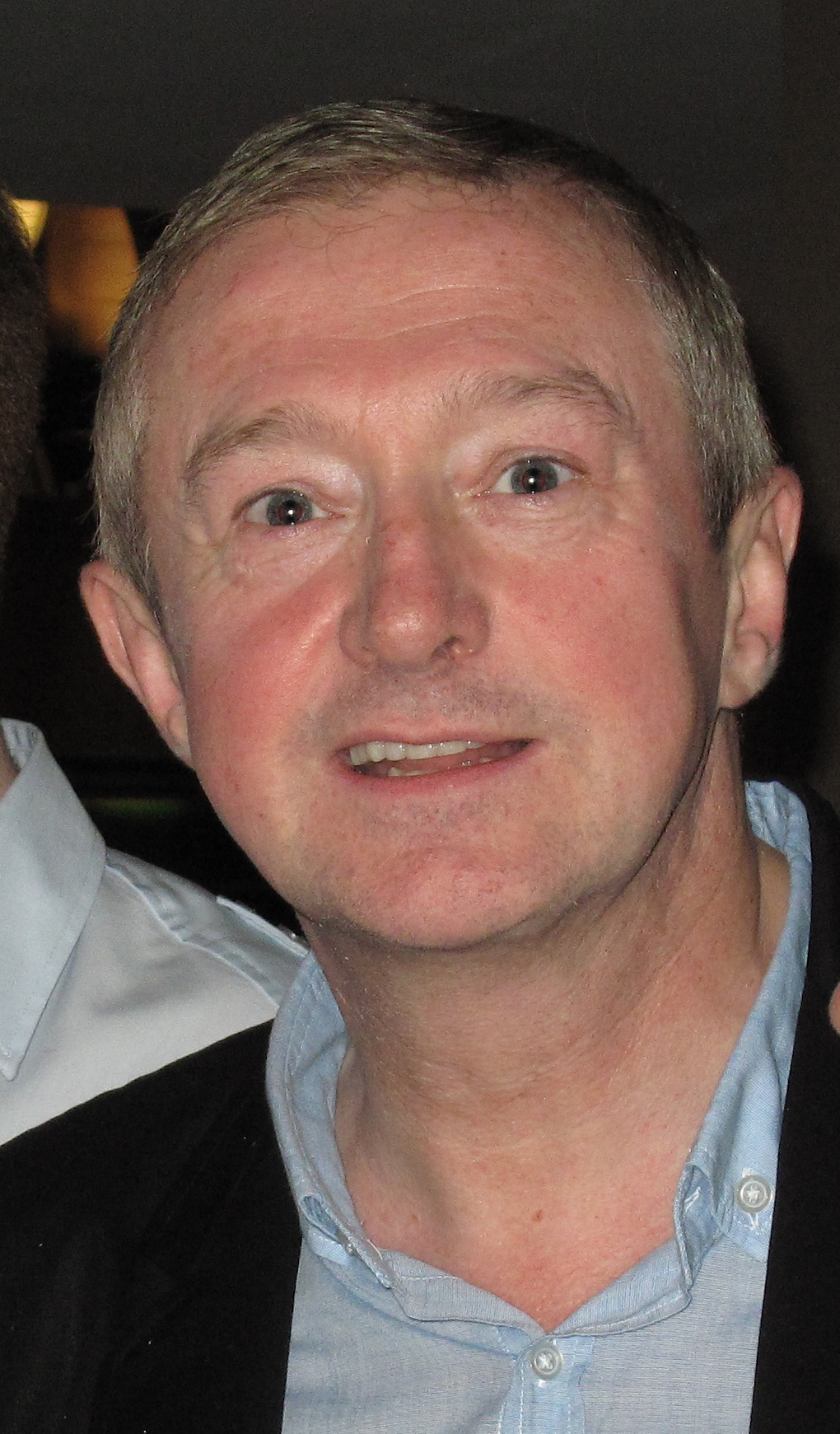
Louis Walsh

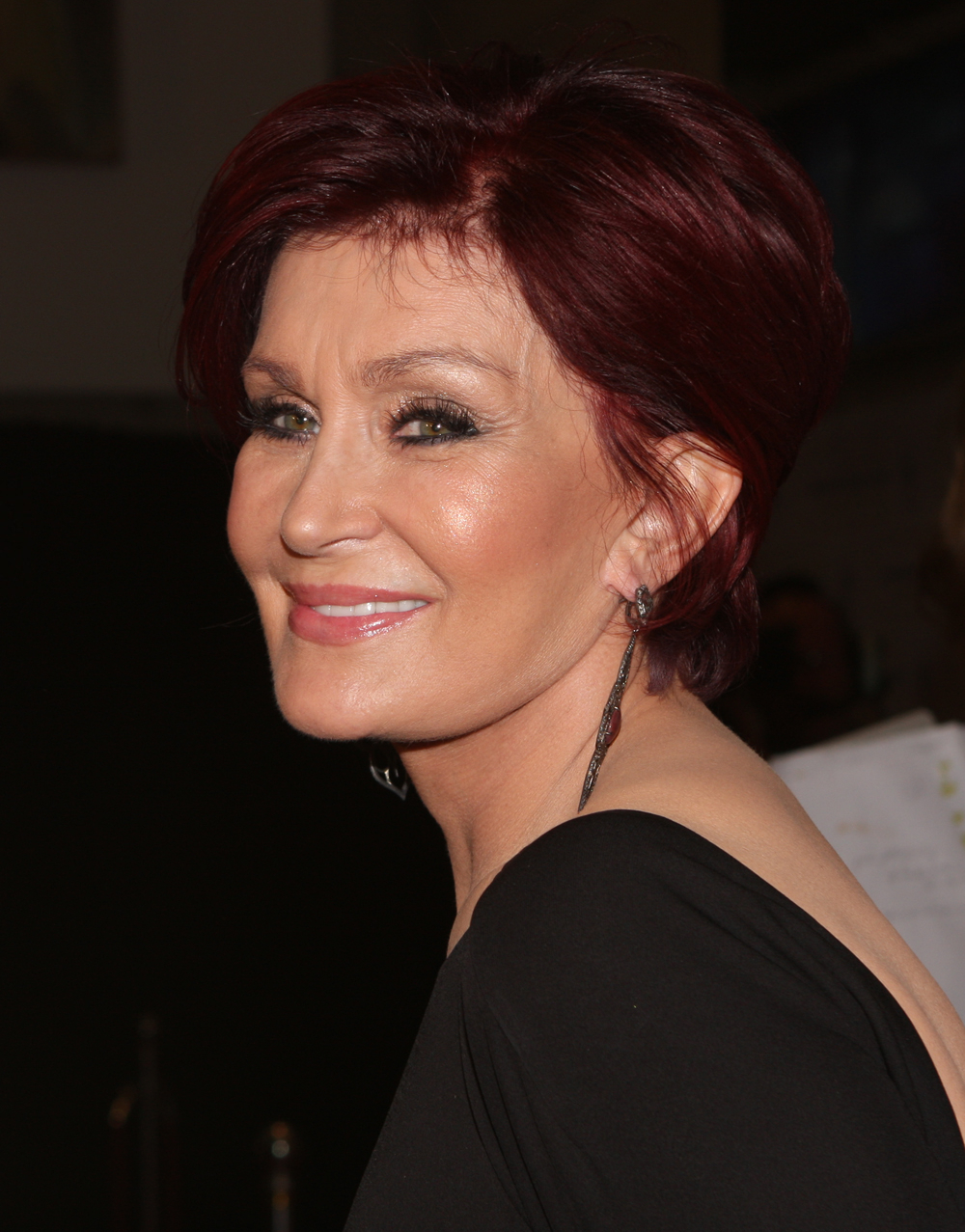
Sharon Osbourne

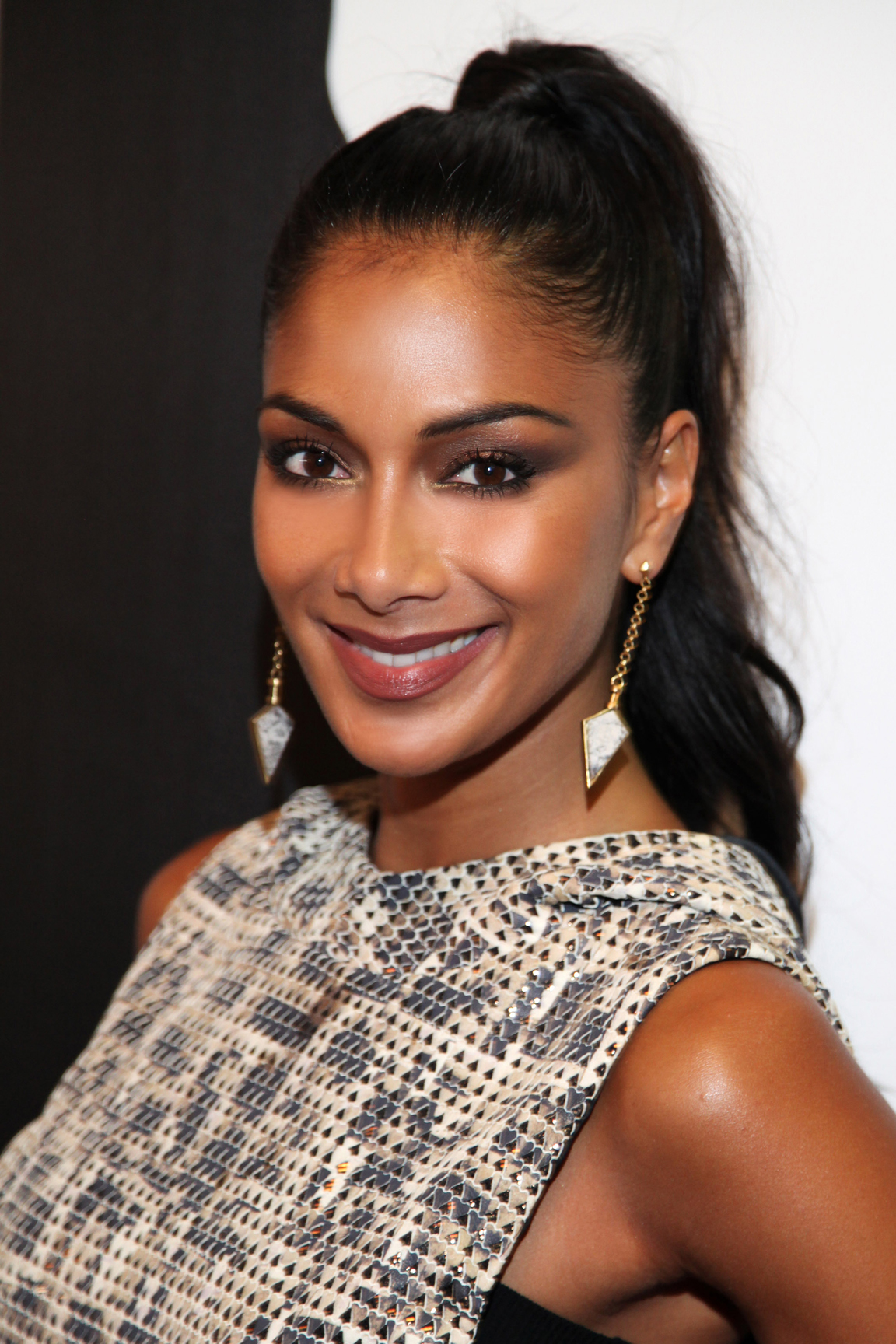
Nicole Scherzinger

Simon Cowell

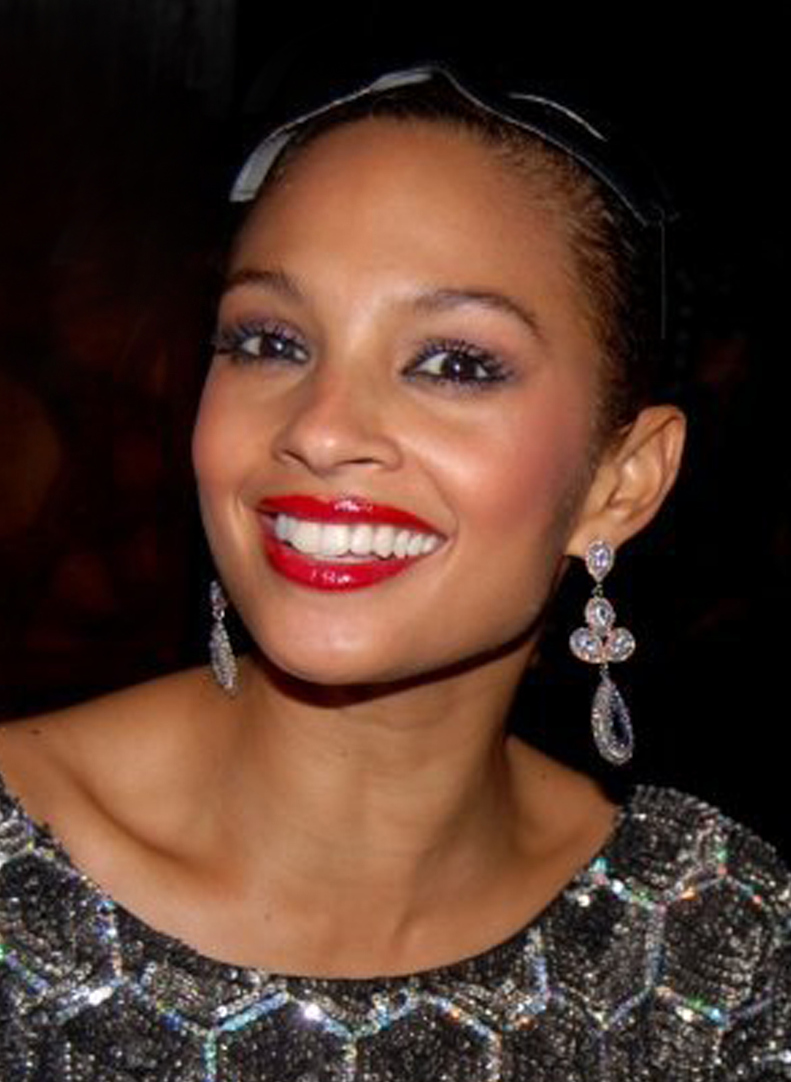
Alesha Dixon (Guest)

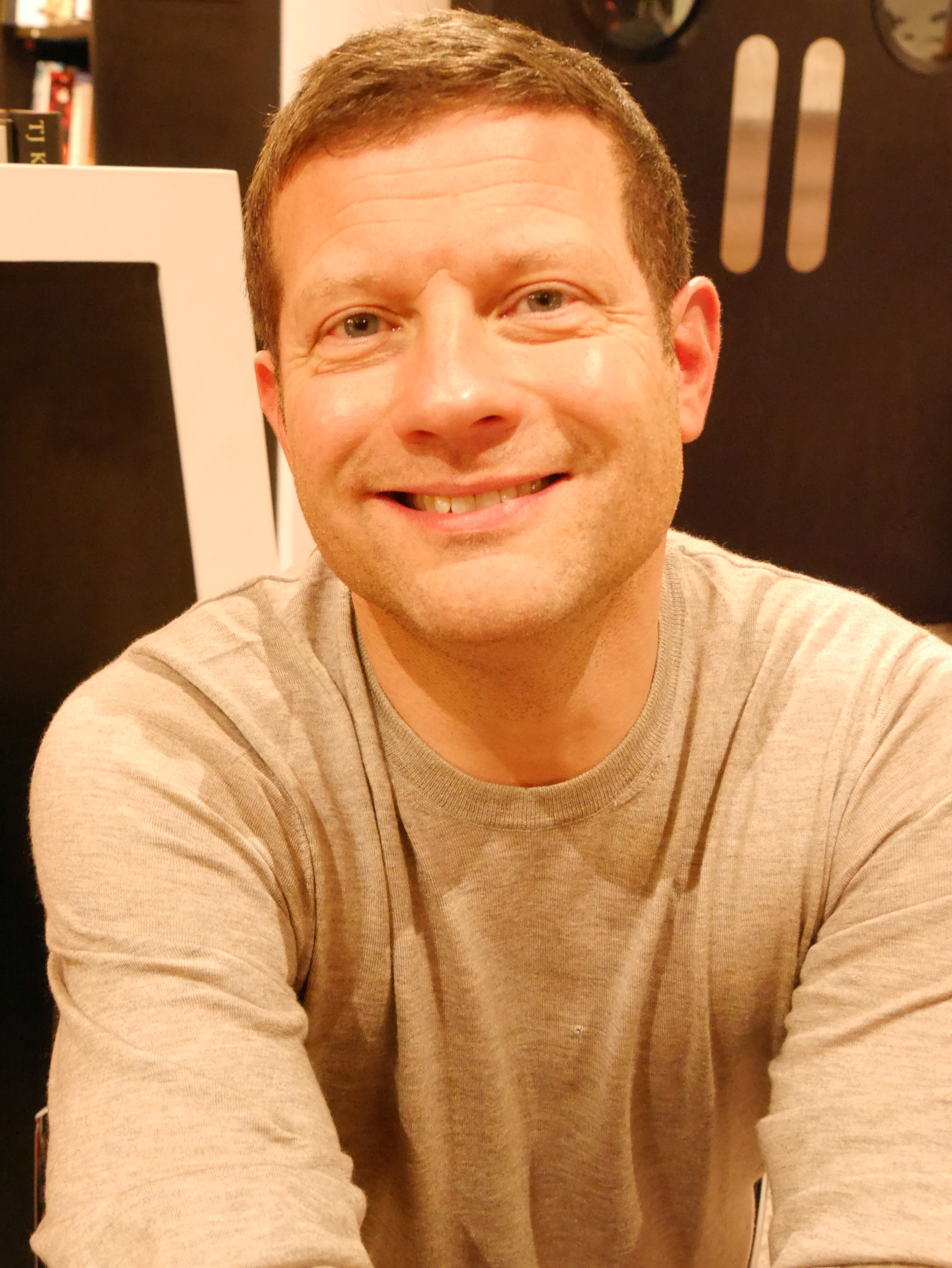
Dermot O'Leary

In December 2016, Louis Walsh confirmed he would continue to judge the series through 2018, stating he had signed through "the next two years". That same month, both Sharon Osbourne and Nicole Scherzinger cast doubt on their return, with Osbourne citing her dual-work on The Talk, and Scherzinger stating: "I can't confirm that I'm going to [be back] but I think if I did return it would have to be with this panel because I'm really close with this panel. [...] I've really enjoyed myself and we're really close." On 13 April 2017, Cowell announced his intentions to retain the same judging panel for the fourteenth series. In June 2017, it was announced that the judging panel would remain the same as the previous series.

Dermot O'Leary returned for his tenth series as presenter. On 23 June 2017, it was announced that Britain's Got Talent judge Alesha Dixon would appear as a guest judge for the first day of Manchester auditions, due to Scherzinger having a "previous diary commitment". Five days later, on 28 June, it was announced that Dixon would once again appear as a guest judge, this time for Osbourne, who was unavailable due to a long-standing back injury. Cowell arrived late to the London auditions on 4 July 2017, due to an illness. On 29 October 2017, Dixon reappeared as a guest judge on the Sunday live show, this time filling in for Cowell, who was absent recovering from an injury during the weekend.

== Selection process ==
On 4 July, it was reported that there would be major changes to the show this year. Auditions were taking place in Thorpe Park, bootcamp would take place in front of an audience and there would be six weeks of live shows instead of the usual ten. Additionally, acts would be sent home on both Saturday and Sunday, as "tedious" Saturday nights received lower viewing figures than Sunday.

=== Auditions ===
The minimum age to audition this year was 14 after being reduced down from 16 the previous year. Contestants needed a "yes" from at least three of the four judges to progress to Bootcamp.

==== Mobile auditions ====
The mobile auditions began on 11 May 2017, in Belfast and concluded on 23 May 2017, in Yeovil.

Summary of mobile auditions
Location	Date(s)	Venue
Belfast	11 May 2017	Victoria Square Shopping Centre
Bangor	12 May 2017	Deninol Shopping Centre
Southampton	13 May 2017	West Quay Shopping Centre
Douglas	14 May 2017	The Strand Shopping Centre
Swansea	14 May 2017	Bambuu Nightclub
Blackpool	16 May 2017	Houndshill Shopping Centre
Bournemouth	16 May 2017	Obscura Cafe
Bristol	16 May 2017	Cabot Circus
Carlisle	17 May 2017	The Lanes Shopping Centre
Brighton	17 May 2017	Churchill Square Shopping Centre
Truro	17 May 2017	The Boat
Newport	19 May 2017	Quay Arts Centre
Wigan	19 May 2017	The Grand Arcade Shopping Centre
Plymouth	19 May 2017	Plymouth Pavilions
Margate	20 May 2017	Westwood Cross
Margate	21 May 2017	Westwood Cross
Stoke on Trent	22 May 2017	Victoria Hall
Exeter	22 May 2017	Princesshay Centre
Thurrock	23 May 2017	Lakeside Shopping Centre
Yeovil	23 May 2017	Quedam Centre

==== Judges' auditions ====
The auditions began on 20 June 2017, in Liverpool and concluded on 10 July 2017, in Surrey.

Summary of judges' auditions
City	Date(s)	Venue	Changes to judging line-up
Liverpool	20–21 June 2017	Titanic Hotel	—N/a
Manchester	24 June 2017	Old Trafford Cricket Ground	Alesha Dixon (in lieu of Nicole Scherzinger)
Manchester	25 June 2017	Old Trafford Cricket Ground	—N/a
Edinburgh	28 June 2017	Assembly Rooms	Alesha Dixon (in lieu of Sharon Osbourne)
London	4–6 July 2017	Tobacco Dock	—N/a
Surrey	9–10 July 2017	Thorpe Park	—N/a

=== Bootcamp ===
Bootcamp was filmed live at The SSE Arena, Wembley in front of a studio audience. Following the filming of bootcamp and prior to the filming of the six-chair challenge, the judges' categories were revealed. Scherzinger was given the Over 28s, Cowell was given the Groups, Osbourne was given the Girls and Walsh was given the Boys. There are two different stages to Bootcamp: Wall of Songs, where a list of 35 songs appeared on a wall 4 times, and the four acts who pick the same song would perform it together, and the judges would decide instantly who would make to the 2nd stage of bootcamp: the bootcamp audition, in front of the judges and a live audience, where after an act performance the judges will instantly decide whether or not they will make it through to the six-chair Challenge. The categories were all revealed in Wembley Stadium, and revealed on TV on 7 October.

=== Six-chair challenge ===
The six-chair challenge took place over the course of three days, from 26 to 28 July 2017, at The SSE Arena, Wembley. Unlike previous years, where all four judges sat together, each judge was secluded on their own while their respective category performed. The three remaining judges sat together and gave their own critiques of the performance, before allowing the category's judge to make the final decision. It was broadcast over three episodes; Osbourne choosing in the first, Cowell and Scherzinger choosing in the second, with later portions of her decisions shown, alongside Walsh's, in the third. During this stage, Cowell called back five rejected soloists from Osbourne's Girls category to form a new five-piece girl group; however, during their performance, he called back one member of a different girl group he had originally rejected and asked her to join the new group, resulting in the newly-six-piece girl group being sent through to judges' houses.

=== Judges' houses ===
The judges' categories were announced in July 2017, with additional details of the judges' houses announced in October 2017. Anthony Russell withdrew after the six-chair challenge and was replaced by Sam Black who was knocked out of the competition at the Bootcamp stage. Black was in Walsh's Boys category. In a statement, Walsh stated, "Anthony has been fantastic across the series, a great singer and performer who we are really sad to see go. I had to think for a long time who could take the place. Sam had a great reaction from the British public when his Audition aired. So I re-watched it and realised we missed a trick not putting him through at Boot Camp. He has that retro 60s style viewers will love. He's really likeable and talented and I can't wait to hear more." At the end of judges' houses, it was announced that the public could vote for a wildcard from each category bringing the total number of contestants for the live shows to 16.

Summary of judges' houses
Judge	Category	Location	Assistants	Acts Eliminated	Wildcards
Cowell	Groups	Southern France	Cheryl	Lemonade, New Girl Band	Jack and Joel
Osbourne	Girls	San Francisco	Jack and Kelly Osbourne	Deanna Mussington, Georgina Panton	Alisah Bonaobra
Scherzinger	Over 28s	South Africa	Stormzy	Slavko Kalezić, Berget Lewis	Talia Dean
Walsh	Boys	Istanbul	Mika	Aidan Martin, Jack Mason	Leon Mallett

== Acts ==
Key:

– Winner
– Runner-Up
– Wildcard (Live Shows)

Act	Age(s)	Hometown	Category (mentor)	Result
Rak-Su	25–26	Watford	Groups (Cowell)	Winner
Grace Davies	20	Blackburn	Girls (Osbourne)	Runner-Up
Kevin Davy White	29	Paris, France	Over 28s (Scherzinger)	3rd Place
Lloyd Macey	23	Ynyshir	Boys (Walsh)	4th Place
The Cutkelvins	20–24	Lanark	Groups (Cowell)	5th Place
Matt Linnen	28	Southend-on-Sea	Over 28s (Scherzinger)	6th Place
Holly Tandy	16	Barnsley	Girls (Osbourne)	7th Place
Rai-Elle Williams	16	Croydon	Girls (Osbourne)	8th Place
Sean and Conor Price	17 & 15	Blessington, Ireland	Groups (Cowell)	9th Place
Sam Black	27	Isle of Man	Boys (Walsh)	10th Place
Alisah Bonaobra	22	Manila, Philippines	Girls (Osbourne)	11th Place
Jack and Joel	23 & 22	Lincolnshire & London	Groups (Cowell)	12th Place
Tracyleanne Jefford	34	Sunbury-on-Thames	Over 28s (Scherzinger)	13th Place
Leon Mallett	22	Norwich	Boys (Walsh)	14th Place
Talia Dean	32	Hounslow	Over 28s (Scherzinger)	15th Place
Spencer Sutherland	25	Pickerington, Ohio, United States	Boys (Walsh)	16th Place

== Live shows ==
The contestants for the live shows were announced during the episode broadcast on 22 October 2017. However, at the end of the episode, a wildcard vote for each category was announced by O’Leary. The winners of the wildcard vote were revealed on 28 October at the start of the first live show.

For the first time since series six, a major overhaul of the set layout was made as live shows debuted in a new filming location, LH2 Studios in London, following the closure of Fountain Studios. Numerous other changes were introduced for this series' live shows. This included contestant and musical guest performances on both Saturday and Sunday shows, and the removal of the final showdowns, deadlocks and judges' votes on the Sunday show. Each show, two of the categories would sing and immediately after the performances, the public vote would open for a short amount of time. At the end of each show, the contestant with the fewest votes is automatically eliminated from the competition. In addition, the contestant with the highest votes for that night would also be announced. The two acts who won their respective public vote would then sing against each other in a new element of the show called the prize fight. After another public vote, the winner of the prize fight would win a special weekly prize. For the first time ever the live final was broadcast from the Excel Centre, London and not Wembley Arena as part of the show's drastic changes this series.

=== Musical guests ===
Liam Payne performed on the first live show, while Stormzy performed on the second live show. Tokio Myers performed on the third live show, while Rita Ora performed on the fourth. Harry Styles performed on the fifth live show and Paloma Faith performed on the sixth. Matt Terry performed on the seventh live show and Fergie performed on the eighth. James Arthur performed on the first semi-final and Ed Sheeran performed on the second. PrettyMuch and Louis Tomlinson performed on Saturday's final, while Pink, Sam Smith, CNCO and Little Mix performed during the Sunday final.

=== Results summary ===
Colour key

–	Act received the fewest public votes and was eliminated
–	Act received the most public votes

Weekly results per act
Act		Week 1		Week 2		Week 3		Quarter-Final		Semi-Final		Final	
Act		Saturday Vote	Sunday Vote	Saturday Vote	Sunday Vote	Saturday Vote	Sunday Vote	Saturday Vote	Sunday Vote	Saturday Vote	Sunday Vote	Saturday Vote	Sunday Vote
Rak-Su		—N/a	1st 22.2%	1st 32.3%	—N/a	2nd 25.7%	—N/a	1st 36.7%	—N/a	1st 26.1%	1st 27.3%	1st 41.7%	Winner; 51.7%^{1}
Grace Davies		1st 21.9%	—N/a		2nd 18.5%	—N/a	2nd 20.1%	—N/a	1st 26.1%	4th 17.2%	2nd 26.0%	2nd 35.4%	Runner-Up; 40.1%^{1}
Kevin Davy White		—N/a	4th 11.1%	—N/a	1st 21.9%	1st 25.8%	—N/a		3rd 21.4%	2nd 19.5%	3rd 18.9%	3rd 22.9%	Eliminated (final)
Lloyd Macey		3rd 15.0%	—N/a	3rd 14.4%	—N/a		1st 26.4%	2nd 22.8%	—N/a	3rd 19.2%	4th 18.2%	Eliminated (semi-final)	
The Cutkelvins		—N/a	2nd 17.3%	2nd 15.1%	—N/a	4th 13.5%	—N/a	3rd 18.9%	—N/a	5th 10.1%	5th 9.6%	Eliminated (semi-final)	
Matt Linnen		—N/a	3rd 11.9%	—N/a	5th 13.6%	3rd 14.1%	—N/a		2nd 22.5%	6th 7.9%	Eliminated (semi-final)		
Holly Tandy		2nd 15.9%	—N/a		3rd 15.4%	—N/a	3rd 19.7%	—N/a	4th 16.1%	Eliminated (quarter-final)			
Rai-Elle Williams		5th 11.5%	—N/a		4th 14.3%	—N/a	4th 14.4%	—N/a	5th 13.9%	Eliminated (quarter-final)			
Sean and Conor Price		—N/a	5th 10.6%	5th 10.6%	—N/a	5th 11.2%	—N/a	4th 15.4%	Eliminated (quarter-final)				
Sam Black		7th 8.5%	—N/a	4th 12.5%	—N/a		5th 11.1%	5th 6.2%	Eliminated (quarter-final)				
Alisah Bonaobra		4th 11.8%	—N/a		6th 9.5%	—N/a	6th 8.3%	Eliminated (week 3)					
Jack and Joel		—N/a	7th 9.2%	6th 8.6%	—N/a	6th 9.7%	Eliminated (week 3)						
Tracyleanne Jefford		—N/a	6th 10.3%	—N/a	7th 6.8%	Eliminated (week 2)							
Leon Mallett		6th 9.3%	—N/a	7th 6.5%	Eliminated (week 2)								
Talia Dean		—N/a	8th 7.4%	Eliminated (week 1)									
Spencer Sutherland		8th 6.1%	Eliminated (week 1)										
Prize Fight	Winner	Grace Davies; 53.5% to win		Kevin Davy White; 53.6% to win		Lloyd Macey; 64.3% to win		Rak-Su; 61.5% to win		No Prize Fight			
Prize Fight	Runner-Up	Rak-Su; 46.5% to win		Rak-Su; 46.4% to win		Kevin Davy White; 35.7% to win		Grace Davies; 38.5% to win		No Prize Fight			
Eliminated		Spencer Sutherland; 6.1% to save	Talia Dean; 7.4% to save	Leon Mallett; 6.5% to save	Tracyleanne Jefford; 6.8% to save	Jack and Joel; 9.7% to save	Alisah Bonaobra; 8.3% to save	Sam Black; 6.2% to save	Rai-Elle Williams; 13.9% to save	Matt Linnen; 7.9% to save	The Cutkelvins; 9.6% to save	Kevin Davy White; 22.9% to win	Grace Davies; 40.1% to win
Eliminated		Spencer Sutherland; 6.1% to save	Talia Dean; 7.4% to save	Leon Mallett; 6.5% to save	Tracyleanne Jefford; 6.8% to save	Jack and Joel; 9.7% to save	Alisah Bonaobra; 8.3% to save	Sean and Conor Price; 15.4% to save	Holly Tandy; 16.1% to save	Matt Linnen; 7.9% to save	Lloyd Macey; 18.2% to save	Kevin Davy White; 22.9% to win	Grace Davies; 40.1% to win
Reference(s)													

- ^1 The voting percentages in week 6 for Sunday do not add up to 100%, owing to the freezing of votes. Kevin Davy White received 8.2% of the final vote.

=== Live show details ===
==== Week 1 (28/29 October) ====
- Theme: "Express Yourself"
- Prize: Trip to New York City, meet and greet with Pink at Madison Square Garden
- Musical guests:
  - Saturday: Liam Payne ("Bedroom Floor")
  - Sunday: Stormzy & MNEK ("Blinded by Your Grace, Pt. 2")

The wildcards were revealed at the start of Saturday's show.

Cowell missed this week's show, due to recovery from falling down the stairs the morning before. Alesha Dixon filled in as a guest judge on Sunday.

Acts' performances on the first and second live shows
28 October
Act	Category (mentor)	Order	Song	Result
Rai-Elle Williams	Girls (Osbourne)	1	"Doo Wop (That Thing)"/"Lost Ones"/"No"	Safe
Spencer Sutherland	Boys (Walsh)	2	"Who You Are"	Eliminated
Holly Tandy	Girls (Osbourne)	3	"Hollow"	Safe
Leon Mallett	Boys (Walsh)	4	"Stay"	Safe
Alisah Bonaobra	Girls (Osbourne)	5	"This Is My Now"	Safe
Sam Black	Boys (Walsh)	6	"Faith"	Safe
Grace Davies	Girls (Osbourne)	7	"Too Young" (original song)	Won Public Vote
Lloyd Macey	Boys (Walsh)	8	"City of Stars"	Safe
29 October
The Cutkelvins	Groups (Cowell)	1	"What About Us"	Safe
Kevin Davy White	Over 28s (Scherzinger)	2	"Stay"	Safe
Talia Dean	Over 28s (Scherzinger)	3	"What Makes You Beautiful"	Eliminated
Jack and Joel	Groups (Cowell)	4	"New Rules"	Safe
Matt Linnen	Over 28s (Scherzinger)	5	"Scars to Your Beautiful"	Safe
Sean and Conor Price	Groups (Cowell)	6	"Strong"	Safe
Tracyleanne Jefford	Over 28s (Scherzinger)	7	"Written in the Water"	Safe
Rak-Su	Groups (Cowell)	8	"Mamacita" (original song)	Won Public Vote
Prize fight details
Grace Davies	Girls (Osbourne)	1	"Too Young"	Winner
Rak-Su	Groups (Cowell)	2	"Mamacita"	Runner-Up

==== Week 2 (4/5 November) ====
- Theme: "Viva Latino"
- Prize: Recording session with a Grammy awarded producer
- Musical guests:
  - Saturday: Tokio Myers ("Angel")
  - Sunday: Rita Ora ("Anywhere")

Acts' performances on the third and fourth live shows
4 November
Act	Category (mentor)	Order	Song	Latin Artist	Result
Jack and Joel	Groups (Cowell)	1	"Havana"/"Hasta el Amanecer"	Camila Cabello /Nicky Jam	Safe
Leon Mallett	Boys (Walsh)	2	"Get Lucky"	Daft Punk	Eliminated
Sean and Conor Price	Groups (Cowell)	3	"Cheap Thrills"	Sean Paul	Safe
Lloyd Macey	Boys (Walsh)	4	"Hero"	Enrique Iglesias	Safe
The Cutkelvins	Groups (Cowell)	5	"Reggaetón Lento (Bailemos)"	CNCO	Safe
Rak-Su	Groups (Cowell)	6	"Dimelo" (original song)	Original	Won Public Vote
Sam Black	Boys (Walsh)	7	"La Bamba"/"Twist and Shout"	Ritchie Valens / Los Lobos	Safe
5 November
Grace Davies	Girls (Osbourne)	1	"Ciao Adios"	Anne-Marie	Safe
Tracyleanne Jefford	Over 28s (Scherzinger)	2	"Ain't Your Mama"	Jennifer Lopez	Eliminated
Rai-Elle Williams	Girls (Osbourne)	3	"Bailando"	Enrique Iglesias	Safe
Holly Tandy	Girls (Osbourne)	4	"Despacito"	Luis Fonsi	Safe
Kevin Davy White	Over 28s (Scherzinger)	5	"Smooth"	Santana	Won Public Vote
Alisah Bonaobra	Girls (Osbourne)	6	"Let's Get Loud"	Jennifer Lopez	Safe
Matt Linnen	Over 28s (Scherzinger)	7	"Livin' la Vida Loca"	Ricky Martin	Safe
Prize fight details
Rak-Su	Groups (Cowell)	1	"Dimelo"		Runner-Up
Kevin Davy White	Over 28s (Scherzinger)	2	"Smooth"		Winner

==== Week 3 (11/12 November) ====
- Theme: "George Michael"
- Prize: Open for Little Mix at Manchester Arena on 21 November 2017
- Musical guests:
  - Saturday: Harry Styles ("Kiwi")
  - Sunday: Paloma Faith ("Guilty")

Acts' performances on the fifth and sixth live shows
11 November
Act	Category (mentor)	Order	Song	Result
Rak-Su	Groups (Cowell)	1	"Faith"	Safe
Matt Linnen	Over 28s (Scherzinger)	2	"Careless Whisper"	Safe
Jack and Joel	Groups (Cowell)	3	"The Edge of Heaven"	Eliminated
The Cutkelvins	Groups (Cowell)	4	"Killer/ Papa Was a Rollin' Stone"	Safe
Sean and Conor Price	Groups (Cowell)	5	"Freedom! '90"	Safe
Kevin Davy White	Over 28s (Scherzinger)	6	"Fastlove, Pt. 1"	Won Public Vote
12 November
Alisah Bonaobra	Girls (Osbourne)	1	"Praying for Time"	Eliminated
Sam Black	Boys (Walsh)	2	"I'm Your Man"	Safe
Grace Davies	Girls (Osbourne)	3	"I Can't Make You Love Me"	Safe
Rai-Elle Williams	Girls (Osbourne)	4	"They Won't Go When I Go"	Safe
Lloyd Macey	Boys (Walsh)	5	"A Different Corner"	Won Public Vote
Holly Tandy	Girls (Osbourne)	6	"One More Try"	Safe
Prize fight details
Kevin Davy White	Over 28s (Scherzinger)	1	"Fastlove, Pt. 1"	Runner-Up
Lloyd Macey	Boys (Walsh)	2	"A Different Corner"	Winner

==== Week 4: Quarter-Final (18/19 November) ====
- Theme: "Crazy in Love"
- Prize: Record own song with Ali Tamposi
- Musical guests:
  - Saturday: Matt Terry ("The Thing About Love")
  - Sunday: Fergie ("Save It Til Morning")

Acts' performances in the quarter-final
18 November
Act	Category (mentor)	Order	Song	Result
Sam Black	Boys (Walsh)	1	"Oops"	Eliminated
Sean and Conor Price	Groups (Cowell)	2	"Issues"	Eliminated
The Cutkelvins	Groups (Cowell)	3	"Saved Me From Myself" (original song)	Safe
Lloyd Macey	Boys (Walsh)	4	"From This Moment On"	Safe
Rak-Su	Groups (Cowell)	5	"Mona Lisa" (original song)	Won Public Vote
19 November
Rai-Elle Williams	Girls (Osbourne)	1	"Mr. Big Stuff"	Eliminated
Kevin Davy White	Over 28s (Scherzinger)	2	"I Will Always Love You"	Safe
Matt Linnen	Over 28s (Scherzinger)	3	"Fallin'"	Safe
Holly Tandy	Girls (Osbourne)	4	"Love Me Harder"	Eliminated
Grace Davies	Girls (Osbourne)	5	"Hesitate" (original song)	Won Public Vote
Prize fight details
Rak-Su	Groups (Cowell)	1	"Mona Lisa"	Winner
Grace Davies	Girls (Osbourne)	2	"Hesitate"	Runner-Up

==== Week 5: Semi-Final (25/26 November) ====
O'Leary confirmed that there would be no Prize Fight from this week onwards and all the categories would perform on the same night for the first time this series.

25 November

- Theme: "Cool Britannia"
- Musical guest: James Arthur ("Naked")

Acts' performances on the Saturday Semi-Final
Act	Category (mentor)	Order	Song	British Artist	Result
The Cutkelvins	Groups (Cowell)	1	"Nothing Like You" (original song)	Original	Safe
Matt Linnen	Over 28s (Scherzinger)	2	"Gimme Shelter"	The Rolling Stones	Eliminated
Grace Davies	Girls (Osbourne)	3	"Life on Mars?"	David Bowie	Safe
Rak-Su	Groups (Cowell)	4	"Flowers"	Sweet Female Attitude	Won Public Vote
Lloyd Macey	Boys (Walsh)	5	"Don't Let the Sun Go Down on Me"	Elton John & George Michael	Safe
Kevin Davy White	Over 28s (Scherzinger)	6	"Come Together"	The Beatles	Safe

26 November

- Theme: "Get Me to the Final"
- Musical guest: Ed Sheeran ("Perfect")

Acts' performances on the Sunday Semi-Final
Act	Category (mentor)	Order	Song	Result
Lloyd Macey	Boys (Walsh)	1	"Fix You"	Eliminated
Rak-Su	Groups (Cowell)	2	"I'm Feeling You" (original song)	Won Public Vote
The Cutkelvins	Groups (Cowell)	3	"Show Me Love"	Eliminated
Kevin Davy White	Over 28s (Scherzinger)	4	"Voodoo Child (Slight Return)"	Safe
Grace Davies	Girls (Osbourne)	5	"Wolves" (original song)	Safe

=== Week 6: Final (2/3 December) ===
O’Leary revealed on 2 December that the winners' single this year would be the contestants' duet.

2 December

- Theme: "No theme"; "Celebrity duets/Winner's single"
- Musical guests: Pete Tong & Heritage Orchestra featuring Becky Hill ("Sing It Back"/ "You've Got the Love") (with Grace Davies, Rak-Su & Kevin Davy White), PrettyMuch ("No More") and Louis Tomlinson ("Miss You")

Acts' performances on the Saturday Final
Act	Category (mentor)	Order	First song	Order	Second song	Result
Kevin Davy White	Over 28s (Scherzinger)	1	"Whole Lotta Love"	4	"Fastlove, Pt. 1" (with Tokio Myers)	Eliminated
Grace Davies	Girls (Osbourne)	2	"Live and Let Die"	5	"Roots" (original song) (with Paloma Faith)	Safe
Rak-Su	Groups (Cowell)	3	"Mamacita" (original song)	6	"Dimelo" (original song) (with Naughty Boy & Wyclef Jean)	Won Public Vote

Kevin Davy White received the fewest public votes and was automatically eliminated.

3 December

- Theme: "Song to win", "Song of the Series"
- Musical guests: Little Mix & CNCO ("Power"/"Reggaetón Lento (Remix)"), Pink ("Beautiful Trauma"/"What About Us"), and Sam Smith ("One Last Song")

Acts' performances on the Sunday Final
Act	Category (mentor)	Order	First song	Order	Second song	Result
Grace Davies	Girls (Osbourne)	1	"Nothing But Words" (original song)	3	"Too Young" (original song)	Runner-Up
Rak-Su	Groups (Cowell)	2	"Touché" (original song)	4	"Mona Lisa" (original song)	Winner

== Winner's single ==
All proceeds from the winner's single are in aid of children's hospice charities, Together for Short Lives and Shooting Star Chase. Simco Limited will donate 100% of its profits from the sale of each download and in respect of all audio streaming of the single, and the Chancellor has also agreed to donate the VAT, in each case to be shared equally by the charities. This donation will be at least 20p plus VAT for each download sold in the UK. FremantleMedia, ITV and all performers featuring on the single have also agreed to forgo any master royalties due to them in connection with downloads and all audio streaming of the single.

== Reception ==
=== Ratings ===
Episode	Air date	Official rating (millions inc. HD & +1)^{,1}	Weekly rank^{,2}
Auditions 1	2 September	7.92	5
Auditions 2	3 September	8.04	4
Auditions 3	9 September	7.23	11
Auditions 4	10 September	7.57	6
Auditions 5	16 September	7.87	8
Auditions 6	17 September	7.50	11
Auditions 7	23 September	6.48	20
Auditions 8	24 September	7.39	11
Bootcamp 1	30 September	6.83	15
Bootcamp 2	1 October	6.34	23
Bootcamp 3	7 October	6.18	24
Six-chair challenge 1	8 October	7.36	13
Six-chair challenge 2	14 October	7.05	12
Six-chair challenge 3	15 October	6.66	24
Judges' houses 1	21 October	7.25	11
Judges' houses 2	22 October	6.26	26
Live show 1	28 October	6.63	19
Live show 2	29 October	5.58	26
Live show 3	4 November	6.08	24
Live show 4	5 November	5.03	33
Live show 5	11 November	5.71	22
Live show 6	12 November	5.38	27
Live show 7	18 November	5.47	26
Live show 8	19 November	5.34	27
Live show 9	25 November	5.18	35
Live show 10	26 November	5.31	31
Live final 1	2 December	5.28	34
Live final 2	3 December	5.83	30
Series average	2017	6.34	—N/a

^{1} The ratings over a 28-day period, including the broadcasts on ITV, ITV HD, ITV+1 and streaming through ITV Hub.
^{2} The rank for the combined ITV, ITV HD and ITV+1 broadcasts, compared with all channels for that week, from Monday to Sunday.
