= Grace Davies =

English singer-songwriter (born 1997)

- Born: 1 February 1997 (age 29); Blackburn, Lancashire, England
- Genres: Pop
- Occupation: Singer-songwriter
- Instruments: Vocals; piano
- Years active: 2015–present
- Label: Syco
- Website: gracedaviesofficial.com

Grace Davies (born 1 February 1997) is an English singer-songwriter. She is an independent artist, previously signed to Syco Music, before the label's demise in 2020. Davies competed on the fourteenth series of The X Factor in 2017, where she finished as runner-up, mentored by Sharon Osbourne. Her song, "Roots", which she performed during her first audition, charted at number 89 on the UK singles chart. In 2025, she released her debut album, The Wrong Side of 25.

== Career ==
In Davies' first audition for The X Factor, she performed an original song titled "Roots", and received four yes votes from the judges. She was mentored by Sharon Osbourne, along with fellow acts Alisah Bonaobra, Holly Tandy and Rai-Elle Williams. She was voted the winner of the Prize Fight in week 1 against Rak-Su, winning a trip to New York and a meet and greet with Pink at Madison Square Garden. Following the eliminations of Bonaobra in week 6 and Tandy and Williams in Week 8, Davies became Osbourne's last remaining act in the competition. She made the final on the weekend of 2 December 2017, alongside Kevin Davy White and Rak-Su. After Davy White was eliminated on Saturday's show, she was in the top two with Rak-Su and finished as the runner-up.

The X Factor performances and results
Show	Song choice	Theme	Result
Auditions	"Roots" – Original song	—N/a	Through to bootcamp round 1
Bootcamp Round 1	"Say You Won't Let Go" – James Arthur (with Lloyd Macey, Spencer Sutherland & Gregor Coleman)	—N/a	Through to bootcamp round 2
Bootcamp Round 2	"Don't Go" – Original song	—N/a	Through to six-chair challenge
Six-chair challenge	"Do It Better" – Original song	—N/a	Through to judges' houses
Judges' houses	"More Than You" – Original song	—N/a	Through to live shows
Live show 1	"Too Young" – Original song	Express Yourself	Safe (1st)
Live show 2	"Ciao Adios" – Anne-Marie	Viva Latino	Safe (2nd)
Live show 3	"I Can’t Make You Love Me" – George Michael	George Michael	Safe (2nd)
Live show 4	"Hesitate" – Original song	Crazy in Love	Safe (1st)
Semi-final	"Life on Mars?" – David Bowie	Idols of Great Britain	Safe (4th)
Semi-final	"Wolves" – Original song	Get Me to the Final	Safe (2nd)
Final	"Live and Let Die" – Paul McCartney and Wings	No Theme	Safe (2nd)
Final	"Roots" – Original song (with Paloma Faith)	Celebrity Duet/ Winners Single	Safe (2nd)
Final	"Nothing But Words" – Original song	Song to Win	Runner-up
Final	"Too Young" – Original song	Song of the Series	Runner-up

On 12 January 2018, Davies confirmed she had signed to Simon Cowell's record label Syco Music. In September 2019, Davies and Tokio Myers performed as guests on America's Got Talent along with Stewart Copeland, performing "Safe and Sound", written by Tokio Myers featuring vocals from Grace Davies. On 24 January 2020, Davies announced that her debut single will be called "Invisible". The song was released on 31 January 2020. On 13 March 2020, Davies announced her second single called "Addicted to Blue", which was released on 20 March 2020. On the same day, she announced the release of her debut extended play, titled Friends with the Tragic, which was released on 26 June 2020. "Amsterdam" was released as the third single from the EP on 1 May 2020. "Just a Girl" was released as the fourth and final single from the EP on 26 June 2020 alongside the EP and the official music video. The EP debuted on the ITunes UK charts at number 52.

After her label Syco had ceased operations, Davies announced her first independent single called "i met a boy online". The song was released on 19 February 2021. "toothbrush" was released on 23 July 2021; it was the first song she made that she got a production credit on. She fought to get a proper production credit on the song because she was "determined to have [her] name above the door on every aspect of [her] music." She has stated that LANY's "Thru These Tears" was a key inspiration for the song. On 18 April 2024, Davies released the song "Illuminate". The song became the official song for the European Athletics Championships 2024 held in Rome, Italy.

Later in 2024, Davies released "A Wonderful, Boring, Normal Life", the first of a string of singles to be included on her debut album. These also included "MDE" and "Super Love Me". She then announced her debut studio album, The Wrong Side of 25, would be released on 11 July 2025.

== Discography ==
=== Studio albums ===
Title	Details
The Wrong Side of 25	Released: 11 July 2025; Label: Believe UK; Formats: CD, vinyl record, digital download, streaming

=== Extended plays ===
Title	Details
My Kingdom	Released: 28 August 2015; Label: Independent; Formats: Streaming
Friends With The Tragic	Released: 26 June 2020; Label: Syco; Formats: digital download, Streaming
I Wonder If You Wonder	Released: 26 November 2021; Label: Independent; Formats: digital download, Streaming, CD
It Wasn’t Perfect, But We Tried	Released: 14 October 2022; Label: Independent; Formats: digital download, Streaming, CD

=== Singles ===
==== As lead artist ====
Title	Year	Peak chart positions	Album
Title	Year	UK	Album
"Invisible"	2020	—	Friends with the Tragic
"Addicted to Blue"	2020	—	Friends with the Tragic
"Amsterdam"	2020	—	Friends with the Tragic
"Just a Girl"	2020	—	Friends with the Tragic
"I Met a Boy Online"	2021	—	I Wonder If You Wonder
"Iris"	2021	—	Non-album single
"Testosterone"	2021	—	I Wonder If You Wonder
"Toothbrush"	2021	—	I Wonder If You Wonder
"Used to You"	2021	—	I Wonder If You Wonder
"Roots"	2021	89	I Wonder If You Wonder
"Wolves"	2022	— (Note: "Wolves" did not enter the UK Singles Chart, but peaked at number 40 on the UK Singles Sales Chart.)	It Wasn't Perfect, But We Tried
"Already Gone"	2022	—	It Wasn't Perfect, But We Tried
"Breathe"	2022	—	It Wasn't Perfect, But We Tried
"Illuminate"	2024	—	Non-album single
"A Wonderful, Boring, Normal Life"	2024	—	The Wrong Side of 25
"Another Night"	2024	—	The Wrong Side of 25
"The 25th"	2024	—	Non-album singles
"It Ain't Christmas (If You’re Not With Me)"	2024	—	Non-album singles
"Do or Die"	2025	—	The Wrong Side of 25
"MDE"	2025	—	The Wrong Side of 25
"Super Love Me"	2025	—	The Wrong Side of 25
"Butterflies" (featuring Sonny Tennet)	2026	—	The Wrong Side of 25

==== As featured artist ====
List of singles, with year released and album name shown
Title	Year	Album
"Things We Lost in the Fire" (Retter LeBlanc featuring Grace Davies)	2016	Non-album singles
"Drop That" (LiTek featuring Grace Davies)	2016	Non-album singles

=== Songwriting credits ===
Song	Year	Artist	Album
"Something Has to Change"	2020	Jack Vallier	Non-album single
"Is There Any Going Back for Us?"	2022	Sianon	Now That It’s Over
"Honey"	2022	Sianon	Now That It’s Over

== Concert tours ==
=== Supporting ===
- The X Factor Live Tour (2018)
- Janet Devlin - The Confessional Tour (2021)
