= Becca Dudley =

British television presenter

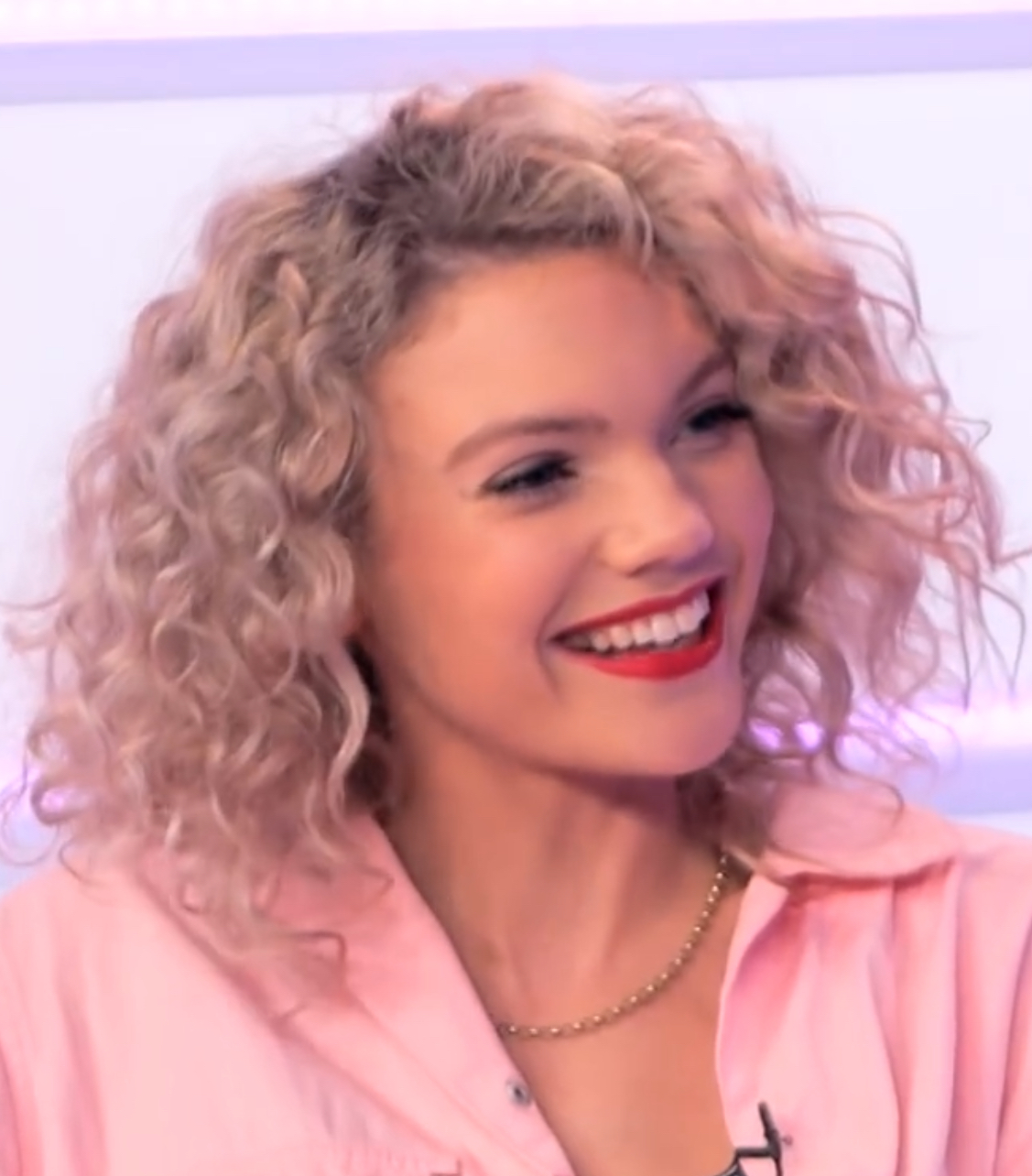
- Dudley in 2017
- Born: Rebecca Elizabeth Dudley; 20 August 1990 (age 36); Harlow, England
- Other name: Becca D
- Education: London College of Fashion
- Years active: 2012–present
- Employers: MTV UK; Beats 1

Rebecca Elizabeth Dudley (born 20 August 1990) is an English presenter, DJ, producer, editor and model. She is known for her work with MTV UK and Beats 1.

== Early life ==
Dudley was born in Harlow, Essex to parents who met in a band. Her maternal grandfather is Jamaican, while her father is half-German. Dudley graduated from the London College of Fashion with a degree in styling and photography.

== Career ==
During university, Dudley was scouted by a photographer to model for the agency Nevs. She also worked as an editor and stylist for Fiasco magazine and wrote a blog titled The Vestimaniac. Dudley was hired to present for MTV UK in 2012. Honing in her skills, she DJ'd on Hoxton Radio in 2013 and began promoting Jamaican artists. She returned to modeling when she appeared in 2014 campaigns for Jack Wills and Boohoo.

Dudley started a YouTube channel and web series dedicated to reggae music under the username DEADLY in 2016. Also in 2016, she hosted the ITV2 series The Hot Desk.

In 2017, Dudley hosted Just Eat's Xtra Bites, a digital companion series to The X Factor. She also featured at the 2017 Strawberries & Creem Festival, appeared in the revival special of MTV's The Grind in Malta with Rio Fredrika, and was an ambassador with Jonas Blue for MTV Music Week.

Dudley hosted the 2020 UK Music Video Awards, which were held virtually, as well as the 2020 MTV Europe Music Awards pre-show with co-host Jamila Mustafa. She returned to said pre-show in 2021 and 2022 to co-host with Jack Saunders on the red carpet.

As of 2024, Dudley hosted the MTV UK series Fresh Out. The series came to an end the following year. In 2025, DEADLY expanded to television in a deal to broadcast on the CODA Network, a Caribbean platform. Dudley served as executive producer.
