= Ayda Field =

American actress (born 1979)

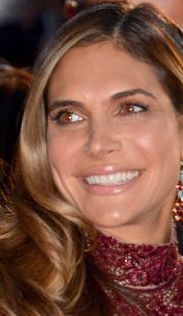
- Field in 2015
- Born: May 17, 1979 (age 47); Los Angeles, California, U.S.
- Other name: Ayda Williams
- Occupation: Actress
- Years active: 1998–present
- Spouse: Robbie Williams (m. 2010)
- Children: 4

Ayda Sabahat Evecan Williams (née Field; born May 17, 1979) is an American actress. She has appeared as a panellist on the British television chat show Loose Women, as well as being a judge on the British version of The X Factor, alongside her husband, singer Robbie Williams. Her acting roles include Fresh Meat and Days of Our Lives.

== Early life ==
Field was born in Los Angeles, California, to a Turkish father, advertiser Haldun Evecan, and an American mother, film producer Gwen Field. Her father was a Turkish Muslim and her mother is Jewish.

She attended Harvard-Westlake School, from which she graduated in 1997.

== Television career ==
Field first became known on the NBC soap opera Days of Our Lives, but has subsequently specialised in comedy roles. She was a regular on Blue Collar TV, guest starred in the sitcom Eve and appeared as Jeannie Whatley on NBC's Studio 60 on the Sunset Strip. On the Fox sitcom Back to You, she played Montana Diaz Herrera (aka Sally Lerner), News 9's weather woman. She also appeared in ten episodes of Season One.

Field joined the cast of a sitcom pilot titled Making It Legal (playing a lawyer named "Elise") but ABC did not pick up the pilot. In June 2008, she was cast in the female lead on ABC's untitled David Kohan/Max Mutchnick comedy pilot, replacing Sarah Lafleur.

Field made her UK TV debut in the final series of Fresh Meat in 2016. In that year, she appeared in the ITV/Netflix series Paranoid. Also in 2016, Field joined ITV's Loose Women as a guest panellist.

In 2018, she joined The X Factor UK judging panel alongside her husband Robbie Williams, show creator Simon Cowell and One Direction's Louis Tomlinson where she replaced Sharon Osbourne.

== Personal life ==
Field married British singer-songwriter Robbie Williams at his home in Mulholland Estates, Beverly Hills on August 7, 2010. They have four children.

== Filmography ==
=== Film ===
Year	Title	Role	Notes
2001	Young Blades	Daughter	
2002	Romeo Fire	Slutka	Television film
2003	Platonically Incorrect		Television film
2007	Making It Legal	Elise	Television film
2008	Strange Wilderness	Mountain Nurse	
2008	Fourplay	Audrey	Television film
2009	Play Dead	Marissa	Direct-to-video
2011	The Short Cut	Ayda Field	Short film
2013	Austenland	Molly	

=== Television ===
Year	Title	Role	Notes
1998	City Girls	Girl #2	Episode: "Party of Three"
2000	Arliss	Girl	Episode: "You Can Pick Your Friends"
2000–01	Days of Our Lives	Angela Moroni	65 episodes
2001	Men, Women & Dogs	Kim	Episode: "A Bone of Contention"
2004–06	Blue Collar TV	Various Characters	5 episodes
2005	Eve	Carla	Episode: "Model Behavior"
2006	Will & Grace	Barbara	Episode: "Partners 'n' Crime"
2006–07	Studio 60 on the Sunset Strip	Jeannie Whatley	15 episodes
2007–08	Back to You	Montana Diaz Herrera	11 episodes
2011	Love Bites	Sapphire	Episode: "How To..."
2012	2 Broke Girls	Constance	Episode: "And the Big Buttercream Breakthrough"
2014	The Exes	Vanessa	Episode: "Nun Like It Hot"
2016	Fresh Meat	Rosa	5 episodes
2016	Power Monkeys	Bea	6 episodes
2016	Paranoid	Sheri	3 episodes
2016–2019, 2024–2025	Loose Women	Herself	43 episodes
2018	The X Factor UK	Judge	series fifteen; 22 episodes
2022	The Bold and the Beautiful	Cecile	Guest Role (1 Episode)

=== Music videos ===
Year	Title	Role	Notes
2009	Robbie Williams - "Bodies"	Love interest	
