= Scarlett Lee =

English singer

- Born: 20 September 1997 (age 28); Epsom, Surrey, England
- Occupation: musician
- Instruments: Vocals, drums
- Years active: 2014–present

Scarlett Lee (born 20 September 1997) is an English singer. In 2018, she finished as runner-up in the fifteenth series of The X Factor. She also competed in the fourteenth series and reached the six chair challenge, but failed to proceed further.

== Career ==
=== 2017–2018: The X Factor ===
Lee first auditioned for The X Factor in 2017, where she reached the six-chair challenge in the girls category. She was briefly given a seat by her mentor Sharon Osbourne after her performance of "Without You" by David Guetta and Usher, but was later sent home after a dramatic sing-off between her and eventual finalists Rai-Elle Williams and Alisah Bonaobra, during which she sang "The Power of Love" by Jennifer Rush.

Lee re-auditioned for The X Factor in 2018. She performed her own original song "Survival", but was stopped by Simon Cowell, who was unimpressed with the song. As Cowell urged her to use her performance to convince the audience to root for her, she performed a cover of Loren Allred's "Never Enough" which earned her four yes votes from the judges. She successfully made it past bootcamp and the six-chair challenge to judges' houses in the girls category, mentored by Cowell. She was then chosen by Cowell for the live shows.

In the quarter-final's results, after the elimination of Bella Penfold and Shan Ako, she became the last act in the girls' category. She finished the competition as the runner-up.

The X Factor performances and results
Show	Song choice	Theme	Result
Auditions	"Survival" – Original song	—N/a	Through to six-chair challenge
Auditions	"Never Enough" – Loren Allred	—N/a	Through to six-chair challenge
Six-chair challenge	"Piece by Piece" – Kelly Clarkson	—N/a	Through to judges' houses
Judges' houses	"I Didn't Know My Own Strength" – Whitney Houston	—N/a	Through to live shows
Live show 1	"(You Make Me Feel Like) A Natural Woman" – Aretha Franklin	This is Me	Safe
Live show 2	"Always On My Mind" – Elvis Presley	Guilty Pleasures	Safe
Live show 3	"I Put a Spell on You" – Screamin' Jay Hawkins	Fright Night	Safe
Live show 4	"I'll Never Love Again" – Lady Gaga	Movie Night	Safe
Quarter-Final	"Can't Take My Eyes Off You" – Frankie Valli	Big Band	Safe
Semi-Final	"This Is Me" – Keala Settle	Get Me to the Final (Part I)	Safe
Semi-Final	"The Winner Takes It All" – ABBA	Mamma Mia	Safe
Semi-Final	"I Didn't Know My Own Strength" – Whitney Houston	Get Me to the Final (Part II)	Bottom two (3rd)
Semi-Final	"This Is Me" – Keala Settle	Sing-off	Safe (Majority vote)
Final	"Your Song" – Elton John	No theme	Runner-up
Final	"Angels" with Robbie Williams	Winner's song	Runner-up
Final	"One More Sleep" with Leona Lewis	Celebrity Christmas Duet	Runner-up

=== 2024: American Idol ===
In 2024, she auditioned for season 22 of American Idol. Lee performed "Clown" by Emeli Sandé. All three judges praised her audition and was advanced to the Hollywood stage of the competition. She made it through another round before being eliminated prior to the top 24, alongside fellow British import and winner of UK's first series of All Together Now, Michael Rice.

== Personal life ==
Lee, a British Romany, was born on 20 September 1997 in Surrey, England. Before The X Factor, Lee worked as a makeup artist. During The X Factor, Lee was involved in a fire, when her brother's caravan set alight. Lee was in the neighbouring caravan at the time, and was later taken into hospital. In January 2019, Lee became engaged to childhood sweetheart Nathan Shaw, and they married in Christ Church Epsom Common on 30 August 2019.

== Discography ==
=== Singles ===
Title	Year	Album
"Love Shy"	2022	Non-album singles
"My Christmas Wish"	2022	Non-album singles
"Hands of Time (My of my)" (with Pontifexx & Antônio Oliva)	2024	Non-album singles
"One For You"	2024	Non-album singles
