= List of awards and nominations received by Nicole Scherzinger =

Nicole Scherzinger awards and nominations
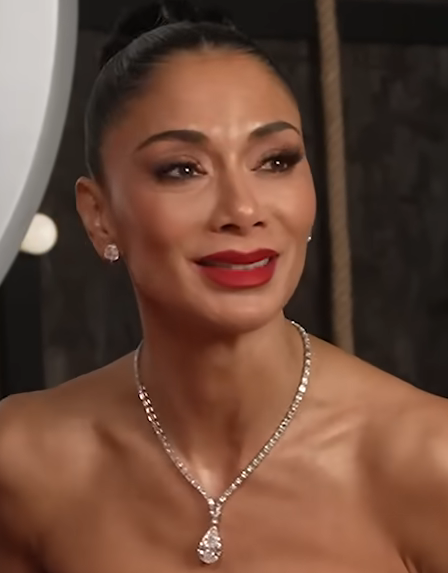
- Scherzinger in 2025
Awards and nominations
Award	Wins	Nominations
BMI Pop Awards	1	1
BMI Urban Awards	1	1
Broadway.com Audience Choice Awards	2	4
Drama Desk Awards	0	1
Drama League Award	1	1
Grammy Awards	0	1
iHeartRadio Music Awards	0	1
Laurence Olivier Awards	1	2
MTV Europe Music Awards	0	1
MTV Video Music Awards	0	1
National Television Awards	0	1
Teen Choice Awards	0	2
Tony Awards	1	1
WhatsOnStage Awards	1	1
World Music Awards	0	4

Totals (Note: Certain award groups do not simply award one winner. They acknowledge several different recipients, have runners-up, and have third place. Since this is a specific recognition and is different from losing an award, runner-up mentions are considered wins in this award tally. For simplification and to avoid errors, each award in this list has been presumed to have had a prior nomination.)
- Wins: 23
- Nominations: 53

Nicole Scherzinger is an American singer, actress, and television personality who has received multiple awards and nominations across music, theater, and television. In 2025 she was included in the annual Time 100 list of the most influential people in the world.

She first achieved worldwide fame as the lead singer of the Pussycat Dolls, earning a Grammy Award nomination for Best Pop Performance by a Duo or Group with Vocals at the 49th Annual Grammy Awards in 2007 amongst other accolades. She went on to enjoy substantial success as a solo artist and television star, winning the tenth season of Dancing with the Stars (2010) and the inaugural season of I Can Do That (2015). Her role on the British singing competition The X Factor was popular amongst audiences and recognized by both Cosmopolitan and Glamour magazines. She was also nominated for Best TV Judge at the 22nd National Television Awards in 2017.

In 2015, Scherzinger received a Laurence Olivier Award nomination for Best Actress in a Supporting Role in a Musical for Cats. For her role as Norma Desmond in the West End and Broadway revivals of Sunset Boulevard, she won the Tony Award for Best Actress in a Musical, the Laurence Olivier Award for Best Actress in a Musical, the WhatsOnStage Award for Best Performer in a Musical, the Drama League Award for Distinguished Performance, and the Evening Standard Awards for Best Musical Performance.

== Awards and nominations ==
Name of the award ceremony, year presented, award category, nominee(s) of the award, and the result of the nomination
Award	Year (Note: Indicates the year of ceremony. Each year is linked to the article about the awards held that year, wherever possible.)	Recipient(s)	Category	Result	Ref.
4Music Video Honours	2011	Scherzinger	Best Girl	Nominated	
4Music Video Honours	2011	"Don't Hold Your Breath"	Best Video	Nominated	
4Music Video Honours	2011	"Right There"	Best Video	Nominated	
The Asian Awards	2013	Scherzinger	Outstanding Achievement in Music	Won	
BDSCertified Spin Awards	2007	"Come to Me" (with P. Diddy)	50,000 Spins Award	Won	
BMI Pop Awards	2008	"Buttons"	Award-Winning Song	Won	
BMI Urban Awards	2008	"Come to Me" (with P. Diddy)	Award-Winning Song	Won	
Broadway.com Audience Choice Awards	2025	Sunset Boulevard	Favorite Leading Actress in a Musical	Won	
Broadway.com Audience Choice Awards	2025	Sunset Boulevard	Favorite Diva Performance	Won	
Broadway.com Audience Choice Awards	2025	Sunset Boulevard	Favorite Onstage Pair (Note: shared with Tom Francis)	Nominated	
Broadway.com Audience Choice Awards	2025	Sunset Boulevard	Favorite Breakthrough Performance (Female)	Nominated	
Cosmopolitan Ultimate Women of the Year Awards	2012	Scherzinger	Ultimate Fun Fearless Female	Won	
Cosmopolitan Ultimate Women of the Year Awards	2013	The X Factor (UK)	Ultimate TV Personality	Won	
Digital Spy Reader Awards	2012	Scherzinger	Sexiest Female	3rd place	
Digital Spy Reader Awards	2016	The X Factor (UK)	Best TV Judge	Runner-up	
Digital Spy Reader Awards	2017	The X Factor (UK)	Best TV Judge	3rd place	
Drama Desk Awards	2025	Sunset Boulevard	Outstanding Lead Performance in a Musical	Nominated	
Drama League Award	2025	Sunset Boulevard	Distinguished Performance Award	Won	
Evening Standard Awards	2023	Sunset Boulevard	Best Musical Performance	Won	
Glamour Awards	2013	The X Factor (UK)	TV Personality	Nominated	
Grammy Awards	2007	"Stickwitu"	Best Pop Performance by a Duo or Group with Vocals	Nominated	
iHeartRadio Music Awards	2025	Sunset Boulevard	Favorite Broadway Debut	Nominated	
Laurence Olivier Awards	2015	Cats	Best Actress in a Supporting Role in a Musical	Nominated	
Laurence Olivier Awards	2024	Sunset Boulevard	Best Actress in a Musical	Won	
MTV Europe Music Awards	2007	Scherzinger	Best Solo Act	Shortlisted	
MTV Europe Music Awards	2014	WS Isle of MTV Malta	Best World Stage Performance	Nominated	
MTV Italian Music Awards	2011	Scherzinger	Best Look	Nominated	
MTV Video Music Awards	2009	"Jai Ho! (You Are My Destiny)" (with A. R. Rahman and The Pussycat Dolls)	Best Choreography	Nominated	
National Television Awards	2017	The X Factor (UK)	Best TV Judge	Nominated	
Outer Critics Circle Awards	2025	Sunset Boulevard	Outstanding Lead Performer in a Broadway Musical	Nominated	
People's Choice Awards	2012	Scherzinger	Favorite Pop Artist	Shortlisted	
Popjustice Readers' Poll	2010	"Poison"	Shoddiest Pop Video	4th place	
Popjustice Readers' Poll	2010	Scherzinger	Best Comeback	9th place	
Popjustice Readers' Poll	2010	Scherzinger	Worst Attempt at Launching a Solo Career	3rd place	
Popjustice Readers' Poll	2011	Scherzinger	Worst Attempt at Launching a Solo Career	7th place	
Popjustice Readers' Poll	2012	Scherzinger	Worst Attempt at Launching a Solo Career	4th place	
Popjustice Readers' Poll	2012	Scherzinger	Didn't Have it, Found it in 2012	4th place	
Popjustice Readers' Poll	2013	Scherzinger	Most Deluded Artist	9th place	
Popjustice Readers' Poll	2013	Scherzinger and Müller	Worst Brand Partnership	3rd place	
Popjustice Readers' Poll	2014	Big Fat Lie	Worst Album	6th place	
Popjustice Readers' Poll	2014	Scherzinger	Major Artist with Disappointing Music Most at Odds with Ability to Achieve Better	6th place	
Popjustice Readers' Poll	2014	Scherzinger	Worst Attempt at a Solo Career	4th place	
Popjustice Readers' Poll	2016	Scherzinger and Müller	Worst Partnership Between Brand and Pop Act	7th place	
Popjustice Readers' Poll	2017	Scherzinger and Müller	Worst Partnership Between Brand and Pop Act	10th place	
Spike Video Game Awards	2010	"GoldenEye"	Best Song in a Game	Nominated	
Teen Choice Awards	2001	Eden's Crush	Choice Pop Group	Nominated	
Teen Choice Awards	2001	Eden's Crush	Choice Breakout Artist	Nominated	
Teen Choice Awards	2001	"Get Over Yourself"	Choice Dance Track	Nominated	
Teen Choice Awards	2012	Men in Black 3	Choice Movie: Female Scene Stealer	Nominated	
Teen Choice Awards	2015	Scherzinger	Choice Selfie Taker	Nominated	
Tony Awards	2025	Sunset Boulevard	Best Actress in a Musical	Won	
Variety's Power of Women Awards	2025	Scherzinger	Power of Women	Won	
Virgin Media Music Awards	2008	Scherzinger	Hottest Female	Nominated	
WhatsOnStage Awards	2024	Sunset Boulevard	Best Performer in a Musical	Won	
World Music Awards	2014	Scherzinger	Best Female Artist	Nominated	
World Music Awards	2014	Scherzinger	Best Live Act	Nominated	
World Music Awards	2014	Scherzinger	Best Entertainer of the Year	Nominated	
World Music Awards	2014	"Fino all'estasi" (with Eros Ramazotti)	Best Song	Nominated	

== Other accolades ==
=== State honors ===
Name of country, year given, and name of honor
Country	Year	Honor	Ref.
United States	2007	April 10, Louisville, Kentucky (Nicole Scherzinger Day)	
United States	2013	Harvard Foundation for Cultural Rhythms Artist of the Year	
United States	2025	The Hometown Heroes Class inductee	

=== Listicles ===
Name of publisher, year listed, name of listicle, and placement
Publisher	Year	Listicle	Placement	Ref.
Gold House (Note: The A100 List honors the most impactful Asians and Asian American & Pacific Islanders (AAPIs) in culture every May for AAPI Heritage Month. Gold House "champions trailblazing members of the AAPI community and their transformative contributions to entertainment, fashion, lifestyle, technology, business, social activism and politics from the past year".)	2025	A100 Most Impactful Asians List	Placed	
Time	2025	Time 100	Placed	
