= List of awards and nominations received by the Pussycat Dolls =

The Pussycat Dolls awards and nominations
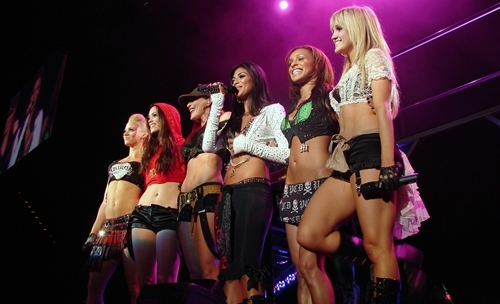
- The Pussycat Dolls performing in December 2005.
Awards and nominations
Award	Wins	Nominations
American Music Awards	0	2
Billboard Music Awards	0	2
Billboard R&B/Hip-Hop Award	1	1
Billboard Touring Awards	0	1
Brit Awards	0	1
Dolly Teen Choice Awards	1	1
ECHO Awards	0	3
Grammy Awards	0	1
Goldene Kamera	1	1
International Dance Music Awards	2	4
Los Premios MTV Latinoamérica	0	1
Meteor Music Awards	0	1
MOBO Awards	0	2
Mnet Asian Music Awards	2	2
MTV Asia Awards	0	1
MTV Australia Awards	0	4
MTV Europe Music Awards	0	1
MTV Video Music Awards	2	9
MuchMusic Video Awards	0	6
MYX Music Awards	1	2
Naomi Awards	1	1
Nickelodeon Kids' Choice Awards	0	1
NRJ Music Awards	1	3
Smash Hits Poll Winners Party	1	4
Soul Train Music Awards	0	2
Teen Choice Awards	0	1
TMF Awards (Belgium)	1	2
TMF Awards (Netherlands)	1	2
Urban Music Awards USA	0	1
World Music Awards	0	1

Totals (Note: Certain award groups do not simply award one winner. They acknowledge several different recipients, have runners-up, and have third place. Since this is a specific recognition and is different from losing an award, runner-up mentions are considered wins in this award tally. For simplification and to avoid errors, each award in this list has been presumed to have had a prior nomination.)
- Wins: 33
- Nominations: 89

The Pussycat Dolls are an American girl group that has received various awards and nominations, including two MTV Video Music Awards and an NRJ Music Award, as well as being nominated for a Grammy Award and Brit Award nominations.

Their debut single "Don't Cha" propelled them to international success in 2005 and earned them a Billboard R&B/Hip-Hop Award for Hot R&B/Hip-Hop Songs Sales while its music video won Best Video at the Smash Hits Poll Winners Party. Their debut studio album, PCD (2005), was recognized as Best International Album at the 2006 TMF Awards and spawned five more singles, including "Stickwitu," which was nominated for a Grammy Award for Best Pop Performance by a Duo or Group with Vocals at the 2007 ceremony and "Buttons". Its music video received two nominations at the 2006 MTV Video Music Awards, winning Best Dance Video. That same year, they received Best Group nominations at the American Music Awards, the MOBO Awards, the MTV Europe Music Awards, and a Brit Award nomination for International Breakthrough Act.

In 2008, the group released their second and final studio album, Doll Domination, which includes the lead single "When I Grow Up". Its music video received six nominations, including Video of the Year at the 2008 MTV Video Music Awards, winning Best Dancing in a Video. The following year, the Pussycat Dolls received the International Duo/Group of the Year award at the NRJ Music Awards.

== Awards and nominations ==
Award	Year	Category	Work	Result	Ref.
American Music Awards	2006	Artist of the Year	—	Nominated	
American Music Awards	2006	Favorite Duo or Group – Pop/Rock	—	Nominated	
American Music Awards	2006	Favorite Breakthrough Artist	—	Nominated	
BDS Certified Spin Awards	2005	50,000 Spins Award	"Beep" (Note: shared with will.i.am)	Won	
BDS Certified Spin Awards	2006	50,000 Spins Award	"Don't Cha" (Note: shared with Busta Rhymes)	Won	
BDS Certified Spin Awards	2006	50,000 Spins Award	"Buttons" (Note: shared with Snoop Dogg)	Won	
BDS Certified Spin Awards	2006	100,000 Spins Award	"Don't Cha"	Won	
BDS Certified Spin Awards	2006	100,000 Spins Award	"Buttons"	Won	
BDS Certified Spin Awards	2006	100,000 Spins Award	"Stickwitu"	Won	
BDS Certified Spin Awards	2006	200,000 Spins Award	"Buttons"	Won	
BDS Certified Spin Awards	2006	200,000 Spins Award	"Stickwitu"	Won	
BDS Certified Spin Awards	2006	300,000 Spins Award	"Don't Cha"	Won	
BDS Certified Spin Awards	2007	300,000 Spins Award	"Buttons"	Won	
BDS Certified Spin Awards	2007	300,000 Spins Award	"Stickwitu"	Won	
Billboard Music Awards	2005	Top-Selling Hot 100 Song of the Year	"Don't Cha"	Nominated	
Billboard Music Awards	2006	Top Duo/Group	—	Nominated	
Billboard R&B/Hip-Hop Awards	2006	Hot R&B/Hip-Hop Songs Sales	"Don't Cha"	Won	
Billboard Touring Awards	2006	Top Package	Back to Basics Tour (Note: shared with Christina Aguilera and Danity Kane)	Nominated	
Bravo Otto	2005	Pop Band	—	Silver	
Bravo Otto	2006	Pop Band	—	Bronze	
Bravo Otto (Hungary)	2007	Best Foreign Group	—	Nominated	
Brit Awards	2006	International Breakthrough Act	—	Nominated	
Dolly Teen Choice Awards	2006	Best Mobile Phone Ringtone	—	Won	
Echo Awards	2006	Best International Newcomer	—	Nominated	
Echo Awards	2007	Best International Group	—	Nominated	
Echo Awards	2008	Best International Group/Collaboration	—	Nominated	
Goldene Kamera	2006	Pop International	—	Won	
Grammy Awards	2007	Best Pop Performance by a Duo or Group with Vocals	"Stickwitu"	Nominated	
Hungarian Music Awards	2006	International Pop Album of the Year	PCD	Nominated	
International Dance Music Awards	2006	Best New Dance Artist Group	—	Won	
International Dance Music Awards	2006	Best R&B/Urban Dance Track	"Don't Cha"	Nominated	
International Dance Music Awards	2006	Best Pop Dance Track	"Don't Cha"	Nominated	
International Dance Music Awards	2006	Best Dance Video	"Don't Cha"	Nominated	
Los 40 Music Awards	2006	Best New Artist — International	—	Nominated	
Los Premios MTV Latinoamérica	2006	Best International New Artist	—	Nominated	
Meteor Music Awards	2006	Best International Group	—	Nominated	
Mnet Asian Music Awards	2006	Best International Artist	—	Won	
Mnet Asian Music Awards	2007	Best International Artist	—	Won	
MOBO Awards	2006	Best Group	—	Nominated	
MOBO Awards	2007	Best Video	"Wait a Minute" (Note: shared with Timbaland)	Nominated	
MTV Asia Awards	2006	Favorite Breakthrough Artist	—	Nominated	
MTV Australia Video Music Awards	2006	Best R&B Video	"Don't Cha"	Nominated	
MTV Australia Video Music Awards	2007	Sexiest Video	"I Don't Need a Man"	Nominated	
MTV Australia Video Music Awards	2007	Best Hook Up	"Buttons"	Nominated	
MTV Australia Video Music Awards	2008	Best Moves	"When I Grow Up"	Nominated	
MTV Europe Music Awards	2006	Best Group	—	Nominated	
MTV Europe Music Awards	2007	Best Urban	—	Shortlisted	
MTV Pilipinas Music Award	2006	Favorite International Video	"Don't Cha"	Nominated	
MTV Video Music Awards	2006	Best Dance Video	"Buttons"	Won	
MTV Video Music Awards	2006	Best Choreography	"Buttons"	Nominated	
MTV Video Music Awards	2008	Video of the Year	"When I Grow Up"	Nominated	
MTV Video Music Awards	2008	Best Dancing in a Video	"When I Grow Up"	Won	
MTV Video Music Awards	2008	Best Direction	"When I Grow Up"	Nominated	
MTV Video Music Awards	2008	Best Choreography	"When I Grow Up"	Nominated	
MTV Video Music Awards	2008	Best Art Direction	"When I Grow Up"	Nominated	
MTV Video Music Awards	2008	Best Cinematography	"When I Grow Up"	Nominated	
MTV Video Music Awards	2009	Best Choreography	"Jai Ho! (You Are My Destiny)" (Note: shared with A. R. Rahman, Nicole Scherzinger, Robin Antin, and Mikey Minden)	Nominated	
MTV Video Play Awards	2007	Most Played Music Videos of the Year	"Wait a Minute"	Platinum	
MuchMusic Video Awards	2006	Best International Group Video	"Don't Cha"	Nominated	
MuchMusic Video Awards	2006	People's Choice: Favourite International Group	"Don't Cha"	Nominated	
MuchMusic Video Awards	2007	Best International Group Video	"Wait a Minute"	Nominated	
MuchMusic Video Awards	2007	People's Choice: Favourite International Group	"Buttons"	Nominated	
MuchMusic Video Awards	2009	Best International Video – Group	"I Hate This Part	Nominated	
MuchMusic Video Awards	2009	MuchMusic.com Most Watched Video	"When I Grow Up"	Nominated	
Myx Music Awards	2006	Favorite International Video	"Don't Cha"	Won	
Myx Music Awards	2007	Favorite International Video	"Buttons"	Nominated	
Naomi Awards	2006	Worst International Breakthrough Artist	—	Nominated	
Nickelodeon Kids' Choice Awards	2009	Favorite Music Group	—	Nominated	
NRJ Music Award	2006	International Breakthrough of the Year	—	Nominated	
NRJ Music Award	2007	International Duo/Group of the Year	—	Nominated	
NRJ Music Award	2009	International Duo/Group of the Year	—	Won	
Smash Hits Poll Winners Party	2005	Best International Band	—	Nominated	
Smash Hits Poll Winners Party	2005	Best R&B Act	—	Nominated	
Smash Hits Poll Winners Party	2005	Hot New Talent	—	Nominated	
Smash Hits Poll Winners Party	2005	Best Video	"Don't Cha"	Won	
Soul Train Music Awards	2006	Best R&B/Soul Single – Group, Band or Duo	"Don't Cha"	Nominated	
Soul Train Music Awards	2007	Best R&B/Soul Single – Group, Band or Duo	"Stickwitu" (Note: shared with Avant)	Nominated	
Spin Awards	2005	Worst New Artist	—	Runner-up	
Teen Choice Awards	2006	Choice Music: R&B/Hip-Hop Track	"Buttons"	Nominated	
TMF Awards (Belgium)	2006	Best Album — International	PCD	Won	
TMF Awards (Belgium)	2006	Best Pop — International	—	Nominated	
TMF Awards (the Netherlands)	2006	Best Newcomer — International	—	Won	
TMF Awards (the Netherlands)	2006	Radio 538 Single Award	"Buttons"	Nominated	
Top of the Pops	2005	Band of the Year	—	Runner-up	
Top of the Pops	2005	Dressed in the Dark	—	Runner-up	
Urban Music Awards USA	2007	Best Female Group	—	Nominated	
Virgin Media Music Awards	2009	Worst Track	"When I Grow Up"	Runner-up	
World Music Awards	2006	World's Best New Artist	—	Nominated	
XM Nation Music Awards	2005	"Turn Up the Heat" - Sexiest Song	"Don't Cha"	Won	
