= PCD World Tour =

2006–07 concert tour by the Pussycat Dolls

- World tour by The Pussycat Dolls
- Location: Asia; Europe; North America
- Associated album: PCD
- Start date: June 15, 2006
- End date: October 10, 2007
- Legs: 4
- No. of shows: 34

The Pussycat Dolls concert chronology
- PCD World Tour (2006–2007); Doll Domination Tour (2009)

The PCD World Tour was the debut concert tour by American girl group the Pussycat Dolls, launched in promotion of their debut studio album, PCD (2005). During the tour, the group also toured North America with Christina Aguilera and the Black Eyed Peas. The group caused controversy during their show at the Sunway Lagoon theme park, breaking Malaysian decency laws.

== Setlist ==
The following setlist was obtained from the concert held on February 4, 2007, at the Manchester Evening News Arena in Manchester, United Kingdom. It does not represent all concerts for the duration of the tour.

1. "Buttons"
2. "Beep"
3. "I Don't Need a Man"
4. "Fever" (Bachar and Thornton solo)
5. "Dance Sequence" (contains elements of "The Pink Panther Theme" and "Don't Cha")
6. "Feelin' Good"
7. "Stickwitu"
8. "How Many Times, How Many Lies" (Scherzinger solo)
9. "Tainted Love"
10. "Hot Stuff (I Want You Back)"
11. "Bite the Dust"
12. "Show Me What You Got (Stomp)"
13. "Wait a Minute"

Encore

14. "Sway"
15. "Whole Lotta Love"
16. "Don't Cha"

== Broadcasts and recordings ==
On February 4, 2007, the Pussycat Dolls' concert at the Manchester Evening News Arena was recorded and streamed online via MSN. The same concert was broadcast on DirecTV through May and June.

== Shows ==
List of 2006 concerts, showing date, city, country, venue, and opening act(s)
Date (2006)	City	Country	Venue	Opening act(s)
June 15 (Note: The show on June 15, 2006, in Lisbon at the Pavilhão Atlântico was part of Cidade FM's Move Ya Body festival.)	Lisbon	Portugal	Pavilhão Atlântico	—N/a
June 24	Amsterdam	Netherlands	Heineken Music Hall	The Opposites; The Partysquad; Gio
July 22 (Note: The concerts on July 22 and 23, 2006, at Izumiotsu Phoenix in Osaka and at Fuji Speedway in Oyama were part of the Udo Music Festival.)	Osaka	Japan	Izumiotsu Phoenix	—N/a
July 23	Oyama	Japan	Fuji Speedway	—N/a
July 26	Bandar Sunway	Malaysia	Sunway Lagoon	—N/a
July 28	Quezon City (Note: Labelled as Manila in promotional material.)	Philippines	Araneta Coliseum	Mikey Bustos; Sway Penala; Honore
November 12	Munich	Germany	Zenith die Kulturhalle	Rihanna
November 13	Frankfurt	Germany	Jahrhunderthalle	Rihanna
November 14	Paris	France	Zénith Paris	Rihanna
November 16	Zürich	Switzerland	Hallenstadion	Rihanna
November 17 (Note: The show on November 17, 2006, in Yenişehir at the CNR Expo Center was part of MTV Turkey's launch party.)	Yenişehir	Turkey	CNR Expo Center	—N/a
November 18	Böblingen	Germany	Sporthalle	Rihanna
November 19	Cologne	Germany	Palladium	Rihanna
November 24	Dublin	Ireland	The Point	Rihanna
November 26	Glasgow	Scotland	SECC Concert Hall 4	Rihanna
November 28	Manchester	England	Manchester Evening News Arena	Rihanna
November 29	Brussels	Belgium	Forest National	Rihanna
November 30	Birmingham	England	National Exhibition Centre	Rihanna
December 1	London	England	Wembley Arena	Rihanna
December 2 (Note: The concert in Ischgl on December 2, 2006, was a free access show as a part of the Top of the Mountain Opening Concert.)	Ischgl	Austria	Silvrettaseilbahn AG	—N/a

List of 2007 concerts, showing date, city, country, venue, and opening act
Date (2007)	City	Country	Venue	Opening act(s)
January 27	Cardiff	Wales	Cardiff International Arena	Rihanna
January 28	London	England	Wembley Arena	Rihanna
January 29	Nottingham	England	Nottingham Arena	Rihanna
January 31	Belfast	Northern Ireland	Odyssey Arena	Rihanna
February 2	Dublin	Ireland	The Point	Rihanna
February 4	Manchester	England	Manchester Evening News Arena	Rihanna
February 5	Sheffield	England	Hallam FM Arena	Rihanna
February 6	Newcastle	England	Metro Radio Arena	Rihanna
March 16	Saskatoon	Canada	Credit Union Centre	—N/a
April 10	Evansville	United States	The Centre	NLT; Chantelle Paige
April 15	Buffalo	United States	Shea's Performing Arts Center	Danity Kane; NLT
April 19	Louisville	United States	Freedom Hall	NLT; Chantelle Paige
April 24	Albany	United States	The Palace Theatre	Danity Kane; NLT
April 30	Chattanooga	United States	Memorial Auditorium	Danity Kane
May 3	Jacksonville	United States	Jacksonville Veterans Memorial Arena	Danity Kane
June 22 (Note: The concert in Bucharest on June 22, 2007, was part of The Coke Live Music Festival.)	Bucharest	Romania	Lacul Morii	—N/a
October 8	Helsinki	Finland	Hartwall Arena	—N/a
October 10 (Note: The concert in Trondheim on October 10, 2007, was part of the UKA-07 festival.)	Trondheim	Norway	Dødens dal	—N/a

=== Box score office data ===
List of concerts, showing date, city, country, venue, attendance and gross revenue
Date (2007)	City	Country	Venue	Attendance	Revenue
January 28	London	England	Wembley Arena	11,441 / 11,441	$661,485
January 29	Nottingham	England	Nottingham Arena	7,132 / 7,500	$384,399
February 4	Manchester	England	Manchester Evening News Arena	14,586 / 14,586	$788,845
February 5	Sheffield	England	Hallam FM Arena	7,768 / 7,768	$528,255
Total				40,927 / 41,295 (99%)	$2,362,984
