= Beep (The Pussycat Dolls song) =

2006 single by the Pussycat Dolls

Single by the Pussycat Dolls featuring will.i.am

from the album PCD
- B-side: "Hot Stuff (I Want You Back)"; "Don't Cha"
- Released: February 6, 2006
- Genre: R&B; orchestral pop; funk
- Length: 3:49
- Label: A&M; Interscope
- Songwriters: William Adams; Kara DioGuardi; Jeff Lynne
- Producer: will.i.am

The Pussycat Dolls singles chronology
"Stickwitu" (2005)	"Beep" (2006)	"Buttons" (2006)

will.i.am singles chronology
"La Paga" (2004)	"Beep" (2006)	"I Love My Chick" (2006)

Music video
- "Beep" on YouTube

"Beep" is a song by American girl group the Pussycat Dolls featuring will.i.am, released as the third single from their debut studio album, PCD (2005). will.i.am produced and co-wrote the track with Kara DioGuardi and Jeff Lynne, incorporating a sample from Electric Light Orchestra's "Evil Woman". An R&B song blending orchestral pop and funk elements, it satirizes superficial male attitudes toward women through censored explicit lyrics and a stomping beat.

Upon its release, "Beep" received mixed reviews from music critics. In the United States, the song failed to replicate the commercial success of its predecessors, peaking at number 13 on the Billboard Hot 100. Internationally, it peaked atop the charts in Belgium and New Zealand, while reaching the top ten in Australia, Austria, Canada, Croatia, Czech Republic, France, Germany, Greece, Ireland, Italy, the Netherlands, Norway, Scotland, Switzerland, and the United Kingdom.

== Production and composition ==
"Beep" was produced and written by will.i.am, with additional songwriting from Kara DioGuardi and Jeff Lynne and additional and vocal production from Ron Fair. will.i.am originally wrote "My Humps" for the Pussycat Dolls, though he later retained it for the Black Eyed Peas. When radio stations refused to play an early Black Eyed Peas track, "Don't Phunk with My Heart," over "funk" sounding too close to a profane term, he responded by writing "Beep" for as a playful challenge: "I'm going to write a song called Beep and see if you beep my beeps." It features a sample of "Evil Woman," written by Lynne and performed by Electric Light Orchestra (ELO), which Fair doubled with newly recorded strings arranged for a 30‑ to 60‑piece orchestra and premixed for mix engineer Dave "Hard Drive" Pensado as stereo room, violins, violas, cello and double bass stems. JD Andrews managed vocal recording, with Mike "Angry" Eleopoulos on additional engineering and Tal Herzberg covering engineering, Pro Tools, additional programming, and bass. Bill Schnee oversaw string recording, backed by The PCD Orchestra on strings. Fair additionally did the arrangement, string arrangement and conducting, and played the Wurlitzer.

Pensado, who generally dislikes traditional string sounds, processed the ELO sample, Fair's live strings and an electric‑violin part to make them behave more like synthesizers, using the Aphex Aural Exciter Type III on the strings and Waves Amp on the electric violin to create a more aggressive, non‑traditional tone. Fair also located the signature, high-pitched, bleep censor sound, which are used to obscure explicit and sexual words. Pensado ran through the console and drove into heavy distortion to increase its harmonic content and make it deliberately abrasive so it would stick in listeners’ heads. He mixed the roughly 90‑track Pro Tools session at Larrabee Studios in Burbank over several days, tightening the rhythmic foundation into a "relentless" groove, slotting mid‑range instruments around the bass and using an aggressive, plug‑in‑based chain and low‑end processing to keep Nicole Scherzinger’s lead vocal, the 808 kick drum and the bass, which results into a "stomping, custom-made beat." Pensado was assisted by Ariel Chobaz.

"Beep"
A sample of "Beep"

"Beep" is a R&B song that veers from orchestral pop to a "loping and downplayed funk groove" with elements of 1980s pop and dance music. The staccato-like verse was compared to the works of Destiny's Child. It is the only single where members other than Scherzinger take lead on the chorus at different points in the song, with Carmit Bachar and Melody Thornton serving as secondary lead vocalists. According to Ricardo Baca from The Denver Post, the song emphasizes the reality of shallow nightclub conversations. In the chorus will.i.am raps: "It's funny how a man only thinks about the [beep] / You got real big brains but I’m looking at your [beep]." According to Clayton Smales of the Townsville Bulletin the song is parody on "superficial" men who care more about a woman's looks than her intelligence. The Pussycat Dolls respond to lyrics alluding to male masturbation.

== Release and commercial performance ==
In July 2005, MTV News reported that "Beep," was being considered to be released as the album's second single. Fair doubted a similar song to "Don't Cha" could replicate its success, hence "Stickwitu," a ballad, was released as the second single. He felt it would showcase a different side of the group and establish longevity. As the third single, it was first released as a January 10, 2006, as one of the first vingle's on iTunes, bundling the track and its music video. It was released to contemporary hit and rhythmic contemporary radio stations on February 6, 2006.

In the United States, "Beep" debuted on the Billboard Hot 100 chart dated February 4, 2006, and later peaked at number 13 on April 8, 2006. The song also reached number 12 on Billboard’s Mainstream Top 40 and number 27 on the Rhythmic Airplay charts. The Recording Industry Association of America (RIAA) certified it platinum, which denotes a million units based on sales and track-equivalent on-demand streams, in March 2026. It topped the charts in both Belgium (Flanders) and New Zealand, spending seven consecutive weeks at number one in the latter and becoming the group’s third consecutive number one single.

Elsewhere, "Beep" reached number two in Ireland, the Netherlands (both the Dutch Top 40 and Single Top 100), Scotland, and the United Kingdom. In 2019, the Official Charts Company’s (OCC) ranked it at number 95 on their girl‑band singles list. On the 2026 rundown of the group's biggest UK singles, it ranks as the group’s seventh‑largest hit, while its B‑side "Hot Stuff (I Want You Back)" also makes the 2026 list at number 18. It charted within the top ten of national record charts, at number three in Australia, on Billboard’s European Hot 100 Singles, in Norway, number five in Canada, Germany, number six in the Czech Republic, Hungary, Switzerland, number seven in Austria, Belgium (Wallonia), number nine in Croatia, Denmark, and number ten in France, Greece, and Italy. It was certified gold in Australia, Denmark, Germany, New Zealand, Sweden, and the UK.

== Critical reception ==
"Beep" was noted as a standout track on PCD by critics including AllMusic's Stephen Thomas Erlewine, who called it will.i.am's funny, sultrier take on Black Eyed Peas' "My Humps"; MSN Music's Robert Christgau, BBC's Lisa Haines, and the Knoxville News Sentinel's Chuck Cambell. The Evening Chronicle's Alexander Hope praised the song for its "fresh and innovative blend of genres" and musical influences that reflect their "feminine power." Attitude magazine ranked "Beep" at number 13 on their 2017 list of the top 15 girl group singles of the past two decades.

Ben Rayner of the Toronto Star found the song not to being "grossly offensive" despite the sexual nature of the song. Chuck Taylor of Billboard magazine described the song as a "series of car-crash nonsequitors" and criticized it as a "cheap gimmick" that feels "cliched and overwrought by production." While reviewing the album, John Murphy of musicOMH found the constant bleep censor sounds "infuriatingly irritating." In a separate review, Murphy mockingly praised will.i.am as a "lyrical poet" for his crude lyrics and dismissed the song as "bland, so dull, just so damn safe" and "oddly sexless," noting that British girl groups like Girls Aloud and Sugababes are better. Digital Spy's Miriam Zendle slammed the song as a "horrendous shambles of a song" with no clear direction, pretentious rapping, a repetitive sample, and lackluster vocals that fail to sound cohesive or sexy. Spence D. of IGN described the song as "mixed bag" for blending multiple genres together. Slant Magazine's Sal Cinquemani described "Beep" as "otherwise degrading material" that is "a bit easier to swallow" thanks to the group's "cartoonish image."

== Promotion and other use ==
The music video for "Beep" was directed by Benny Boom and shows the Pussycat Dolls delivering a "high‑energy" performance with choreography that builds to a dance‑break sequence in a nightclub setting. A writer for Complex noted that the video sees Scherzinger aiming for a Ciara‑style vibe and regarded it positively overall.

A performance of "Beep" was added to Yahoo!’s Live@Launch in October 2005. They next performed the song on the season‑35 premiere of Soul Train, which aired on November 5, 2005. They performed the song during their opening set for the Black Eyed Peas in 2006. In June 2006 they traveled to France and performed at Fête de la musique 2006 and Tout le monde en parle. The song in the set list of their first headlining concert tour, PCD World Tour (2006–2007), during their opening set for Christina Aguilera's Back to Basics Tour (2007), and their second headlining tour, Doll Domination Tour (2008).

"Beep" was featured in the 2007 competitive karaoke game, SingStar. British musical comedy duo Frisky & Mannish produced a parody, which they reinterpret the track in a music‑hall style and explicitly replace the censored lyrics referenced in the original song. On February 22, 2020, "Beep" was included in a medley on Ant & Dec's Saturday Night Takeaway that playfully addressed backlash to their November 2019 The X Factor: Celebrity performance, which had drawn over 400 Ofcom complaints about their outfits and choreography.

== Track listings and formats ==
- Australian and German CD maxi single
1. "Beep" (album version) – 3:49
2. "Don't Cha" (live) – 3:31
3. "Hot Stuff (I Want You Back)" (remix) – 4:08
4. "Beep" (music video)
- UK CD maxi single
1. "Beep" (album version) – 3:49
2. "Hot Stuff (I Want You Back)" (remix) – 4:08
3. "Beep" (music video)
4. "Sway" (music video)
- German CD single
1. "Beep" (album version) – 3:49
2. "Don't Cha" (live) – 3:31
- UK CD single
1. "Beep" (album version) – 3:49
2. "Hot Stuff (I Want You Back)" (remix) – 4:08
- UK 12" vinyl
1. "Beep" (album version) – 3:49
2. "Beep" (instrumental) – 3:49
3. "Hot Stuff (I Want You Back)" (remix) – 4:08

== Credits and personnel ==
Credits adapted from the liner notes of PCD.

Sample

- Contains a sample of the recording "Evil Woman", written by Jeff Lynne, and performed by Electric Light Orchestra.

Personnel

- JD Andrews – vocal recording
- Charlie Bisharat – electric violin
- Ariel Chobaz – assistant mix engineer
- Kara DioGuardi – songwriting
- Mike "Angry" Eleopoulos – additional engineering
- Ron Fair – additional production, vocal production, arrangement, string arrangement and conduct, wurlitzer,
- Tal Herzberg – engineering, Pro Tools, additional programming, bass
- The PCD Orchestra – strings
- Dave "Hard Drive" Pensado – mixing
- Bill Schnee – string recording
- will.i.am – songwriting, production

== Charts ==
=== Weekly charts ===
Chart (2006)	Peak position
Australia (ARIA)	3
Australian Urban (ARIA)	1
Austria (Ö3 Austria Top 40)	7
Belgium (Ultratop 50 Flanders)	4
Belgium (Ultratop 50 Wallonia)	6
Canada (Nielsen SoundScan)	5
Canada CHR/Pop Top 30 (Radio & Records)	4
Croatia International Airplay (HRT)	9
Czech Republic Airplay (ČNS IFPI)	6
Denmark Airplay (Tracklisten)	9
European Hot 100 Singles (Billboard)	3
Finland (Suomen virallinen lista)	11
France (SNEP)	10
Germany (GfK)	5
Greece (IFPI)	10
Hungary (Editors' Choice Top 40)	6
Ireland (IRMA)	4
Italy (FIMI)	2
Netherlands (Dutch Top 40)	2
Netherlands (Single Top 100)	2
New Zealand (Recorded Music NZ)	1
Italy (FIMI)	10
Romania (Romanian Top 100)	33
Scotland Singles (OCC)	2
Slovakia Airplay (ČNS IFPI)	37
Sweden (Sverigetopplistan)	15
Switzerland (Schweizer Hitparade)	6
UK Singles (OCC)	2
UK Hip Hop/R&B (OCC)	2
US Billboard Hot 100	13
US Pop Airplay (Billboard)	12
US Rhythmic Airplay (Billboard)	27

=== Year-end charts ===
Chart (2006)	Position
Australia (ARIA)	24
Australian Urban (ARIA)	6
Austria (Ö3 Austria Top 40)	51
Belgium (Ultratop 50 Flanders)	15
Belgium (Ultratop 50 Wallonia)	28
European Hot 100 Singles (Billboard)	21
France (SNEP)	58
Germany (Media Control GfK)	39
Netherlands (Dutch Top 40)	47
Netherlands (Single Top 100)	28
New Zealand (RIANZ)	2
Romania (Romanian Top 100)	84
Switzerland (Schweizer Hitparade)	39
UK Singles (OCC)	31
UK Urban (Music Week)	35
US Billboard Hot 100	84
US Mainstream Top 40 (Billboard)	51

== Certifications ==
Certification and sales for "Beep"
Region	Certification	Certified units/sales
Australia (ARIA)	Gold	35,000^{^}
Denmark (IFPI Danmark)	Gold	4,000^{^}
Germany (BVMI)	Gold	150,000^{‡}
New Zealand (RMNZ)	Gold	5,000^{*}
Sweden (GLF)	Gold	10,000^{^}
United Kingdom (BPI)	Gold	400,000^{‡}
United States (RIAA)	Platinum	1,000,000^{‡}
^{*} Sales figures based on certification alone.^{^} Shipments figures based on certification alone.^{‡} Sales+streaming figures based on certification alone.

== Release history ==
Release dates and formats for "Beep"
Region	Date	Format(s)	Label(s)	Ref.
United States	February 6, 2006	Contemporary hit radio; rhythmic contemporary radio	A&M; Interscope	
Germany	February 27, 2006	Maxi CD	Universal Music	
United Kingdom	February 27, 2006	CD	Polydor	
Germany	March 6, 2006	CD	Universal Music	
Australia	March 27, 2006	Maxi CD	Universal Music	
France	June 19, 2006	CD	Universal Music	

== See also ==
- List of number-one singles from the 2000s (New Zealand)
- Ultratop 50 number-one hits of 2006
