= Vingle =

Portmanteau of video and single

A vingle is a portmanteau of video and single. The neologism refers to music videos that can be mixed by VJs in the same way that DJs mix regular music singles.

The word was coined by a group of VJs in London in late 2003, at the This Is Clip Hop party during ResFest, organised by the audio-visual artist collective "0.1". Vingles were subsequently seen in 0.1's launch party for Hewlett-Packard's HyPe Gallery project..

An example vingle would be Hexstatic's Timber.

Apple Computer has applied for a trademark on the term.
