= PCD (album) =

Studio album by the Pussycat Dolls
- Released: September 12, 2005
- Recorded: 2004–2005
- Genres: Pop; dance-pop; R&B
- Length: 44:22
- Label: A&M
- Producers: Polow da Don; Kara DioGuardi; the Droyds; Siobhan Fahey; Ron Fair; Steven Gallifent; Sean Garrett; CeeLo Green; Kwamé "K1MiL"; Timbaland; will.i.am; Greg Wells

The Pussycat Dolls chronology
PCD (2005)	PCD Live from London (2006)

Singles from PCD
- 1. "Don't Cha" Released: April 19, 2005; 2. "Stickwitu" Released: September 26, 2005; 3. "Beep" Released: February 6, 2006; 4. "Buttons" Released: April 11, 2006; 5. "I Don't Need a Man" Released: September 25, 2006; 6. "Wait a Minute" Released: October 16, 2006

PCD is the debut studio album by American girl group the Pussycat Dolls. It was released on September 12, 2005, by A&M Records. Largely produced by Ron Fair, the record's musical style is a fusion of pop, R&B and dance-pop. Its lyrics focus on themes of sexuality, love, and feminism.

In 1995, the Pussycat Dolls were created as a burlesque troupe by choreographer Robin Antin. After attracting media attention, Antin struck a joint venture with Interscope Records to develop the Pussycat Dolls into a brand in 2003, with Jimmy Iovine assigning the project to Fair. Following the recruitment of singers Nicole Scherzinger and Melody Thornton alongside troupe members Carmit Bachar, Ashley Roberts, Jessica Sutta, and Kimberly Wyatt, the recording of PCD commenced in 2004. As one of the executive producers, Fair enlisted producers such as Kwamé, Polow da Don and Rich Harrison. Collaborators on the record included rappers Busta Rhymes, will.i.am, and Timbaland.

PCD received mixed reviews from music critics, who were favorable towards the selection of dance-pop tracks but criticized the album's balladry and covers, considering it contradictory to the group's sexual image. Exceeding industry expectations, the album became a commercial success, debuting at number five on the US Billboard 200 and reaching the top 10 in numerous countries, including number one in New Zealand. It went on to be certified quadruple platinum by the Recording Industry Association of America (RIAA), for combined sales and album-equivalent units of four million in the United States. As of 2020, PCD has sold nine million units worldwide.

PCD produced six singles—"Don't Cha", "Stickwitu", "Beep", "Buttons", "I Don't Need a Man", and "Wait a Minute". "Don't Cha", "Stickwitu", and "Buttons" all reached the top five on the US Billboard Hot 100 and in numerous countries worldwide, with "Stickwitu" nominated for Best Pop Performance by a Duo or Group with Vocals at the 49th Annual Grammy Awards (2007). The Pussycat Dolls further promoted the album with televised performances, including those at the 2005 MTV Europe Music Awards and the American Music Awards of 2006. Touring extensively, the group embarked on the PCD World Tour (2006–2007), while performing as supporting acts on the Black Eyed Peas' Honda Civic Tour and Christina Aguilera's Back to Basics Tour.

== Background and recording ==
The Pussycat Dolls were created by choreographer Robin Antin and her roommate Christina Applegate in 1993 after inviting several dancers to explore Antin's idea of classic Las Vegas-style burlesque and give it a more contemporary spin. In 1995, the group began performing every Thursday at Johnny Depp's Los Angeles club, the Viper Room. In 2002, Gwen Stefani was invited to sing and perform with the Dolls by Carmit Bachar (The only member of the Burlesque Troupe to go on to become a member of the recording group) and brought along Interscope Geffen A&M chairman Jimmy Iovine and then-president of A&M Records; both took interest into turning it into a singing group. In 2003, Antin struck a joint venture with Interscope Records to develop the Pussycat Dolls into a brand, with Iovine assigning the project to Fair. Fair stated that he wanted to create an album which would "involve music and visuals". He explained that "there's going to be some technological changes as well as creative changes in the way we go about it." The auditions drew about 500 aspiring performers, of which two singers—Nicole Scherzinger and Melody Thornton—were recruited, joining Carmit Bachar, Ashley Roberts, Jessica Sutta and Kimberly Wyatt to form a new recording group. Fair stated that even though "there were some adequate voices in the original group," Scherzinger and Thornton where needed "to bring the ability." In 2004, they recorded "We Went as Far as We Felt Like Going" for the Shark Tale soundtrack and recorded their own version of "Sway", which was released as single to promote the movie Shall We Dance?.

At the suggestion of Doug Morris—then chairman of Universal Music Group, "Don't Cha", which was originally recorded by Tori Alamaze and became a minor success on Billboard's Hot R&B/Hip-Hop Songs chart, was given to the Pussycat Dolls as the label was trying to reinvent the girl group. While "Don't Cha" became an international success worldwide, an album had not been recorded yet. Fair stated, "we scrambled, got into formation" and worked on the album within 30 days at The Record Plant in Hollywood, California. According to Scherzinger, they took the time to put out the best record possible. She further explained that they were very selective with their songs and producers. As one of the executive producers, Fair enlisted a wide range of songwriters and producers for PCD, including CeeLo Green, Rich Harrison, Timbaland, and will.i.am. While searching for songs for the album, an A&R at Interscope Records and friend of Siobhan Fahey, a founding member of the girl group Bananarama, played to Iovine the song "Bitter Pill", which was included on Shakespears Sister's Songs from the Red Room (2009). After Fahey emailed the backing track to the label, it was radically altered and became "Hot Stuff (I Want You Back)", as they sampled Donna Summer's "Hot Stuff" in the chorus. Although Fahey did not like the group's version, financially she was delighted as it helped her fund her recordings.

== Music and lyrics ==
Inspired by the chorus of "Swass" by Sir Mix-a-Lot, CeeLo Green wrote and produced the opening track, "Don't Cha"; using "controlled and competent" vocals, the protagonist taunts a "hapless man" in the chorus because his girlfriend is inferior to her. "Don't Cha" also features "garrulous" rap vocals by Busta Rhymes. "Beep", featuring will.i.am, veers from orchestral pop to a "loping and downplayed funk groove" with elements of 1980s pop music. The staccato-like chorus incorporates bleep censors that hides risqué lyrical parts and rejects objectification. It interpolates the song "Evil Woman" by the British rock band Electric Light Orchestra. "Wait a Minute" features Timbaland, with whom the Pussycat Dolls have a "boy-girl give-and-take". It also includes "sassy handclaps". In the pop ballad "Stickwitu", the group celebrates monogamous relationships. "Buttons" is a hip hop-influenced pop and R&B track featuring "snaky synths" over a Middle Eastern rhythm. Its lyrics "fits right into the burlesque strip tease performances" that the Pussycat Dolls originated from.

The post-disco "I Don't Need a Man" shares feminist themes with "Beep", and sees the group expressing disinterest in co-dependency towards a male partner. "Hot Stuff (I Want You Back)", contains elements of "Hot Stuff" by Donna Summer. The song is a "throwback mock disco" with elements of electropop. "How Many Times, How Many Lies" is a downtempo ballad which sees Scherzinger lamenting. "Bite the Dust" uses "dramatic" strings and was compared to the works of Destiny's Child. "Right Now" is a Broadway-influenced big band track. The track incorporates accentuated horns and congas, which pay homage to Shirley Bassey. Similarly to British duo Soft Cell, the group recorded a medley of Gloria Jones' "Tainted Love" (1965) and the Supremes' "Where Did Our Love Go" (1964). The track was noted for utilizing elements of Soft Cell's "synth pop classic". The standard edition's closing track, a cover of Nina Simone's "Feeling Good", was described as a "faux-jazz" version of the original song.

== Marketing and touring ==
The Pussycat Dolls began promoting PCD with live performances as early as 2004. They performed "Tainted Love" with Carmen Electra on VH1 Divas on April 18, 2004, as their US televised performance debut. The song was also performed at the annual charity fundraiser Fashion Rocks on September 8, and with "Sway" on The Late Late Show on October 20. "Buttons" was performed for the first time on New Year's Eve with Carson Daly on December 31, 2004. On April 9, 2005, the Pussycat Dolls performed at the opening of their lounge at Caesars Palace in Las Vegas, accompanied by Eva Longoria and Busta Rhymes. "Don't Cha" was released as their debut single, and the lead single from PCD, on April 19, 2005. It was performed at KIIS-FM's annual festival Wango Tango on May 14; Brandee J. Tecson of MTV News commented: "Like a lot of the day's performers, the Dolls were newcomers to the Wango stage, but ended the night like veterans." By peaking at number two on the US Billboard Hot 100 and reaching number one in 12 countries, (Note: attributed to multiple sources) "Don't Cha" became the Pussycat Dolls' breakthrough hit, and one of the biggest hits of 2005 worldwide. The song was subsequently performed at the 2005 Teen Choice Awards on August 14.

PCD was released on September 12, 2005 in the UK, and the following day in the US, by A&M Records. Though "Beep" had been slated for release as the album's second single, it was replaced by "Stickwitu", which was released on September 26. "Stickwitu" reached number five on the US Billboard Hot 100, and became the group's second consecutive number-one single in New Zealand and the UK. On November 4, the group performed "Don't Cha" in a house-influenced remixed form at the 2005 MTV Europe Music Awards in Lisbon, Portugal. The group then embarked on a promotional tour in Sydney, Australia on November 6, encompassing appearances on Australian Idol and at a Dolly party, alongside radio, television and print interviews. On December 6, the Pussycat Dolls performed "Don't Cha", "Stickwitu", and "Wait a Minute" at the annual KIIS-FM Jingle Ball in Los Angeles, with some members wearing "festive candy-cane-striped belly shirts and red-and-green capri pants". The group performed "Stickwitu" at the Radio Music Awards on December 19, with its B-side "Santa Baby", being accompanied by Snoop Dogg for the latter, and with "Don't Cha" on Dick Clark's New Year's Rockin' Eve on December 31, 2005. "Don't Cha" and "Sway" were performed during the results show of Dancing with the Stars on January 27, 2006.

On February 6, 2006, "Beep" was issued as the third single from PCD. It peaked at number 13 on the US Billboard Hot 100, and number two in the UK, also becoming the group's third consecutive number-one single in New Zealand. As the supporting act for the Black Eyed Peas, the Pussycat Dolls toured the US during the Honda Civic Tour from March to May 2006, and the UK during The Monkey Business Tour throughout June. A remix of "Buttons" featuring Snoop Dogg was released as the fourth single on April 11. It became a worldwide hit, reaching number three on the US Billboard Hot 100, and number one in Austria, Hungary, and New Zealand. The song was performed on The Tonight Show with Jay Leno on May 18, on Good Morning America's Summer Concert Series on June 30, with "Don't Cha" and "Stickwitu", on So You Think You Can Dance on July 13, at Fashion Rocks with rapper Jibbs on September 8, and at the American Music Awards of 2006 on November 21. "I Don't Need a Man" was released as the fifth international single from PCD on September 25, while "Wait a Minute" was issued in the US on October 16. The former reached the top 10 in countries such as Australia, Belgium, the Netherlands, New Zealand, and the UK, while the latter peaked at number 28 on the US Billboard Hot 100.

The Pussycat Dolls embarked on their headlining debut PCD World Tour, with initial shows across Europe and Asia throughout June and July 2006, before opening for the Black Eyed Peas during The Monkey Business Tour's August–September North American leg. A double-disc tour edition of PCD was released outside North America, starting on September 29, 2006 in Germany, where the Pussycat Dolls performed "Sway" on Wetten, dass..? the following day. The PCD World Tour resumed in November 2006, with concerts across Europe through February 2007. In December 2006, "Right Now" was selected as the opening number for the American Broadcasting Company (ABC)'s coverage of the remainder of the 2006–07 NBA season. The group filmed an advertisement, in which they perform a re-recorded version of "Right Now" while wearing jerseys of different National Basketball Association (NBA) teams. The re-recording was released as a promotional single on January 23, 2007. Between February and May, the Pussycat Dolls toured North America by alternating between headlining shows and opening for Christina Aguilera during her Back to Basics Tour. On July 7, 2007, the group was among the performers at the London concert for Live Earth, held to raise awareness of global warming; they performed "Don't Cha", "Stickwitu", and "Buttons".

In celebration of its 20th anniversary, PCD was reissued in multiple different configurations. A remix album, titled PCD (Remixed), was made available for digital consumption on April 17, 2026, including 18 remixes and alternate versions of the album's tracks. On May 8, an extended edition of PCD was released on CD and limited-edition vinyl, while the original album was issued on vinyl worldwide for the first time. The 25-track PCD Forever deluxe edition, titled after the Pussycat Dolls' 2026 reunion tour, was digitally released the same day.

== Critical reception ==
Professional ratings
Review scores
Source	Rating
AllMusic	3/5 stars
Blender	2/5 stars
The Encyclopedia of Popular Music	3/5 stars
Jam!	1.5/5 stars
People	2.5/4 stars
Robert Christgau	(1-star Honorable Mention)
Rolling Stone	2.5/5 stars
RTÉ	3/5 stars
Slant Magazine	3/5 stars
USA Today	3/4 stars

On release, PCD was met with a mixed critical response. Its sonic quality and dance-oriented material elicited praise from critics such as those of The Ledger and AllMusic's Stephen Thomas Erlewine, though both identified the album as a solo effort by Scherzinger with minimal input from other members. Writing for USA Today, Elysa Gardner hailed "infectious hooks and grooves" on standout tracks such as "Stickwitu" and "I Don't Need a Man". Conversely, IGN's Spence D. was more receptive of the jazz-influenced "retro" tracks "Right Now" and "Feelin' Good", describing the remainder of the record as a "mélange of innocuous pop-cum-R&B studio crafted fluff". Linda McGee from RTÉ emphasized the Pussycat Dolls' range, regarding both vocal talent and "distinctive" tracks, on a "[s]lick, energetic and market-driven" debut. In his "Consumer Guide", Robert Christgau gave the album a one-star honorable mention, indicating "a worthy effort consumers attuned to its overriding aesthetic or individual vision may well like"; he selected "Beep" and "Wait a Minute" as highlights.

Inclusion of covers and ballads on PCD elicited particular criticism. Raymond Fiore of Entertainment Weekly and BBC's Lisa Haines both lambasted "Hot Stuff (I Want You Back)" and "Tainted Love"/"Where Did Our Love Go", but commended the group's vocal performance throughout the album. Erlewine expressed disappointment with ballads such as "Stickwitu", which he said "undercuts the joyous carnal celebration" of the up-tempo tracks. Darryl Sterdan of Winnipeg Sun dismissed the "embarrassing" covers and "overcooked" balladry, further criticizing the group's lack of involvement in songwriting. In Blender, Josh Eells compared the covers' sound to "the after-dinner show on a Carnival cruise". Slant Magazine's Sal Cinquemani wrote that "though sufficiently un-icky", the ballads were "still difficult to take seriously" due to the album's sexually provocative themes on songs such as "Buttons". Albeit complimentary towards the first half of PCD, Chuck Arnold and Ralph Novak of People remarked that the second half saw the group "stumble badly on a few remakes". Despite the critical polarity, "Stickwitu" earned a nomination for Best Pop Performance by a Duo or Group with Vocals at the 49th Annual Grammy Awards (2007). In a retrospective review ahead of the 20th anniversary of PCD, The Recording Academy's Jon O'Brien reflected on the covers more positively, writing that the Pussycat Dolls "gave several classics new life" with their "empowering spin".

== Commercial performance ==
PCD debuted and peaked at number five on the US Billboard 200 with first-week sales of 99,000 copies, according to data compiled by Nielsen SoundScan for the chart dated October 1, 2005. It also debuted at number eight on the US Top R&B/Hip-Hop Albums. On its 45th week the album reentered the top-ten on the chart dated July 26, 2006 and remained in the top-ten for a final time the following week at number nine. PCD was released amidst an era of stagnant album sales due to the emergence of digital and physical piracy and a shift in consumer interest. The album managed to remain within the top 50 for 59 non-consecutive weeks due to the strength of its first four singles, earning them a reputation among the century's few breakout success. Geoff Mayfield, former analyst and director of Billboard charts, commented that this type of success does not happen often. "It's unusual for any act to get as many as four hits off an album anymore. For much of this decade, it's been a real challenge to get a third or even a second hit. And that's not just for new artists. That's for established artists too." As of September 2008, PCD has sold nearly three million copies in the US and the Recording Industry Association of America (RIAA) certified the album double platinum, which denotes shipments of two million copies.

In the United Kingdom, the album entered the UK Albums Chart at number eight, as its lead single, registered its second week atop the UK Singles Chart. With sales of 23,900, PCD was the second highest new entry on the chart that week. After 12 weeks of being outside the top ten, PCD reached number ten on the chart dated December 12, 2005, due to the success of "Stickwitu", which remained atop the UK Singles Chart and helped the album improve its week-to-week sales. The release of the album's fourth single "Buttons" helped the album increase sales for six consecutive weeks, setting a new peak of seven. In June 2019, The Official Charts Company compiled a list with the 40 best-selling albums by female groups of the last 25 years. With sales surpassing 1.3 million copies, PCD is the fourth best-selling album in the UK. The British Phonographic Industry (BPI) certified the album four times platinum for selling 1.2 million copies. In Ireland, 42 weeks after its debut, PCD peaked at number seven in the final week of June 2006.

In mainland Europe PCD performed moderately at the beginning, debuting at number 12 in Germany, 14 in Portugal, 18 in Austria, 26 in Denmark, 35 in Norway, 39 in Finland, 43 in France, 55 in Italy and Sweden, 76 in the Netherlands, 72 in Spain, 92 in Belgium (Flanders), 97 in Belgium (Wallonia), on their respective local album charts. In 2006, PCD improved its chart positions, entering the top-10 in Belgium (Flanders), Germany, the Netherlands, and Norway, and top-twenty in Portugal, Belgium (Wallonia), and Denmark. The album was certified gold in Austria (IFPI), France (SNEP), Norway (IFPI), and Switzerland (IFPI), platinum in Belgium (BEA) and the Netherlands (NVPI), and double platinum in Germany (BVMI). In Belgium, PCD won the 2006 TMF Award for Best International Album, based on its popularity in the country.

Similarly in Oceania, PCD debuted at number 16 in Australia on the ARIA Top 100 Albums Chart before reaching a new peak of eight in August 2006. The Australian Recording Industry Association (ARIA) certified it triple platinum following shipments of 210,000. In New Zealand, PCD debuted at number twenty-three on September 19, 2005. Six months later and following three consecutive number-one singles,—"Don't Cha", "Stickwitu", and "Beep"—the album peaked atop the album's chart making the Pussycat Dolls the first girl group in over six years to do so since Bardot with their debut self-titled album. PCD returned at the top spot three weeks later and received a double platinum certification by the Recorded Music NZ (RMNZ). Worldwide, the album sold a total of 9 million copies to date.

== Track listing ==
Standard track listing
No.	Title	Writer(s)	Producer(s)	Length
1.	"Don't Cha" (featuring Busta Rhymes)	Anthony Ray; Thomas Callaway; Trevor Smith	CeeLo Green	4:32
2.	"Beep" (featuring will.i.am)	William Adams; Kara DioGuardi; Jeff Lynne	will.i.am; Ron Fair^{[a]}	3:49
3.	"Wait a Minute" (featuring Timbaland)	Timothy Mosley; Keri Hilson; Craig Longmiles^{[f]}	Timbaland; Hilson^{[b]}; Fair^{[c]}	3:42
4.	"Stickwitu"	Franne Golde; Kasia Livingston; Robert Palmer	Fair; Tal Herzberg^{[d]}	3:27
5.	"Buttons"	Sean Garrett; Jamal Jones; Jason Perry; Nicole Scherzinger	Polow da Don; Garrett; Fair; Herzberg^{[d]}; Young Smoke^{[d]}	3:45
6.	"I Don't Need a Man"	Rich Harrison; Scherzinger; DioGuardi; Vanessa Brown^{[f]}	Harrison; Fair^{[c]}	3:39
7.	"Hot Stuff (I Want You Back)"	Pete Bellotte; Harold Faltermeyer; Keith Forsey; Siobhan Fahey; Clare Kenny; Steven Gallifent; Will Blanchard	Fahey; the Droyds; Gallifent; Fair^{[b]}	3:47
8.	"How Many Times, How Many Lies"	Diane Warren	Fair; Herzberg^{[d]}	3:56
9.	"Bite the Dust"	Hilson; Kwamé Holland	Kwamé "K1MiL"; Hilson^{[b]}; Fair^{[a]}	3:33
10.	"Right Now"	Herbie Mann; Carl Sigman	Fair; Herzberg^{[d]}	2:27
11.	"Tainted Love"/"Where Did Our Love Go"	Ed Cobb; Brian Holland; Lamont Dozier; Eddie Holland	Fair; Herzberg^{[d]}; Big Tank^{[e]}	3:26
12.	"Feelin' Good"	Leslie Bricusse; Anthony Newley	Fair; Herzberg^{[a]}	4:19
Total length:				44:22

20th anniversary track listing
No.	Title	Writer(s)	Producer(s)	Length
13.	"Sway"	Norman Gimbel; Pablo Beltrán Ruiz	Fair; Herzberg^{[d]}	3:12
14.	"Flirt"	DioGuardi; Greg Wells; Scherzinger	Wells; DioGuardi	2:56
15.	"We Went as Far as We Felt Like Going"	Bob Crewe; Kenny Nolan; Harold Clayton; Sigidi Abdullah	Fair; Herzberg^{[d]}	3:50
16.	"Stickwitu" (featuring Avant)	Golde; Livingston; Palmer; Myron Avant	Fair; Herzberg^{[d]}; Peter Mokran^{[a]}^{[b]}; Avant^{[b]}	3:17
17.	"Don't Cha" (live version)			3:29
18.	"Buttons" (featuring Snoop Dogg)	Garrett; Jones; Perry; Scherzinger; Calvin Broadus	Polow da Don; Garrett; Fair^{[a]}^{[b]}; Herzberg^{[d]}; Young Smoke^{[d]}	3:48
19.	"Don't Cha" (More Booty)	Ray; Callaway; Smith	CeeLo Green	4:48
20.	"Hot Stuff (I Want You Back)" (remix)	Bellotte; Faltermeyer; Forsey; Fahey; Kenny; Gallifent; Blanchard	Fahey; the Droyds; Gallifent; Fair^{[a]}	4:06
21.	"Don't Cha" (with Blond:ish; featuring Busta Rhymes)		Blond:ish; Green; Broken Hill; Novodor	2:54
22.	"Beep" (with Devault; featuring will.i.am)		Adams; Sage Devault; Fair^{[a]}	2:27

=== Notes ===
- ^{^[a]} signifies an additional producer
- ^{^[b]} signifies a vocal producer
- ^{^[c]} signifies an incidental producer
- ^{^[d]} signifies a co-producer
- ^{^[e]} signifies "Tainted Love" beat producer
- ^{^[f]} signifies a retrospectively credited songwriter
- Track 13 originally appeared on international pressings.
- Track 14 originally appeared on Latin American and select Asian pressings, as well as international revised pressings.
- Track 15 originally appeared on UK pressings.
- UK special edition pressings and the expanded edition include tracks 13–15. Japanese pressings additionally include track 17.
- Taiwanese special edition pressings include a bonus DVD containing music videos for tracks 1, 2, 4, 5, and 13.
- Tour edition pressings include a bonus disc containing tracks 13, 14, 16, and 18–20, alongside four ringtones.
- PCD Forever deluxe edition includes a bonus disc containing tracks 13–15, 18, 21, and 22, alongside Charlotte Plank and Showmusik remixes of track 1, the Mary Droppinz remix of track 3, the J.Robb remix of track 4, Jason Nevins and Gudfella remixes of track 5, and the Sim0ne remix of track 6.

Sample credits

- "Don't Cha" contains interpolations of "Swass" by Sir Mix-a-Lot.
- "Beep" contains a sample from "Evil Woman" by Electric Light Orchestra.
- "Hot Stuff (I Want You Back)" contains elements of "Hot Stuff" by Donna Summer, and an uncredited sample from "Bitter Pill" by Shakespears Sister.
- "Bite the Dust" contains drum samples from "Soul Machine" by Harvey and the Phenomenals.
- "We Went as Far as We Felt Like Going" is a medley of "Far as We Felt Like Goin'" by Labelle, and "Take Your Time (Do It Right)" by the S.O.S. Band.

== Personnel ==
Credits adapted from the liner notes of PCD.

Performers

- Nicole Scherzinger – lead vocals, background vocals
- Carmit Bachar – vocals, backing vocals
- Melody Thornton – vocals, backing vocals
- Ashley Roberts – background vocals
- Jessica Sutta – background vocals
- Kimberly Wyatt – background vocals
- Busta Rhymes – featuring artist, vocals, co-writer (track 1)
- will.i.am – featuring artist, vocals, co-writer (track 2)
- Timbaland – featuring artist, vocals (track 3)
- Kara DioGuardi – additional background vocals (track 14)
- Kaya Jones – additional background vocals (tracks 13 & 15)

The PCD Orchestra

- Violins – Endre Granat, Natalie Leggett, Bruce Dukov, Jackie Brand, Charlie Bisharat, Joel Derouin, Sara Parkins, Mario Deleon, Josefina Vergara, Tammy Hatwan, Sid Page, Roberto Cani, Katia Popov, Phillip Levy, Songa Lee, Robin Olson, Anatoly Rosinsky, Armen Garabedian, Theresa Stanislov, Sarah Thornblade, Alan Grunfeld, Alyssa Park
- Violas – Bryan Dembow (P), Simon Oswell, Sam Formicola, Matt Funes, Darrin McCann, Vicky Miskolczy
- Cello – Steve Erbody, Larry Corbett, David Low, Suzie Katayama, Armen Ksajikian, Cecilia Tsan
- Orchestra Contractor – Bill Hughes
- Bass – Pino Palladino

Technical

- CeeLo Green – production (track 1)
- Ethan Mates – engineering (track 1)
- Steve Baughman – mixing (track 1)
- John Goux – guitar (tracks 1, 11)
- Ray Herrman – sax (track 1)
- Nick Lane – trombone (track 1)
- Bill Churchvile – trumpet (track 1)
- Chris Tedesco – trumpet, horn (track 1)
- will.i.am – production (track 2)
- Ron Fair – vocal production (tracks 2, 5–7), production (tracks 2, 4, 5, 8, 10–13, 15), string arrangement and conduct (tracks 2, 4, 10, 12), mixing (tracks 3, 7), organ, rhodes (tracks 4, 12), incidental production (tracks 3, 6), vocal arrangement (tracks 6, 7), wurlitzer (tracks 2, 6, 8), piano (tracks 4, 6, 8, 12), glockspiel (track 6), harmonica (tracks 4, 8, 12), clavinet (track 8), additional production (track 9), additional string arrangement (track 10), keyboards (track 11)
- Tal Herzberg – additional programming (track 2), Pro Tools, engineering (tracks 2, 3, 5–12), co-production (tracks 4, 5, 10–13, 15), bass (tracks 2, 4, 6, 8, 11)
- Dave "Hard Drive" Pensado – mixing (tracks 2, 3, 5, 9)
- Charlie Bisharat – electric violin (tracks 2, 5)
- The PCD Orchestra – strings (tracks 2, 4, 7–12)
- JD Andrew – recording (track 2), engineering (tracks 5–11), vocal recording (track 11)
- Bill Schnee – strings recording (tracks 2, 7–12)
- Mike "Angry" Eleopoulos – additional engineering (tracks 2, 4, 9), engineering (tracks 5–12), vocal recording (track 11)
- Ariel Chobaz – assistant mix engineering (tracks 2–5, 9)
- Timbaland – production (track 3)
- Keri Hilson – production (track 3), vocal production (track 9),
- Jerry Hey – horn arrangement, horns (tracks 3, 6, 9, 11), string arrangement and conduct, trumpets (track 10)
- Dan Higgins – horns (tracks 3, 6, 9, 11)
- Gary Grant – horns (tracks 3, 6, 9, 11), trumpets (track 10)
- Bill Reichenbach – horns (tracks 3, 6, 9, 11)
- Dan Higgins – horns (tracks 3, 6, 9, 11)
- Marcella Araica – recording (track 3)
- Demacio "Demo" Castellon – recording (track 3)
- Peter Mokran – recording (tracks 4, 8)
- Robert Palmer – original drum programming (track 4)
- Cori Jacobs – rhodes (tracks 4, 12)
- Allen Sides – string recording (track 4)
- Polow Da Don – production, arrangement, programming (track 5)
- Sean Garrett – production (track 5)
- Young Smoke – co-production (track 5)
- Luis Conte – percussion (tracks 5, 10)
- Rich Harrison – production, programming (track 6)
- Scotty Beats – engineering (track 6)
- Mike Hogue – assistant mix engineering (track 6)
- Siobhan Fahey – production (track 7)
- The Droyds – production (track 7)
- Steven Gallifent – production (track 7)
- Andy Chatterley – arrangement (track 7)
- Nicole Scherzinger – vocal arrangement (track 7)
- Tyler Coomes – programming (track 8)
- Tim Carmon – organ (track 8)
- Jun Ishizeki – assistant mix engineering (tracks 8, 11)
- Kwamé "K1MiL" – production (track 9)
- Anthony Kilhoffer – Pro Tools, engineering (track 9)
- Michael C Ross – mixing (track 10)
- Vinnie Colaiuta – mixing (track 10)
- Mike Valerio – bass (track 10)
- Wayne Bergeron – trumpets (track 10)
- Larry Hall – trumpets, trombones (track 10)
- Frank Wolf – mixing (track 10)
- Andy Martin – trombones (track 10)
- Bruce Otto – trombones (track 10)
- Larry Williams – woodwinds (track 10)
- Brandon Fields – woodwinds (track 10)
- Bill Liston – woodwinds (track 10)
- Joel Peskin – woodwinds (track 10)
- Bob Zimmitti – timpani (track 10)
- Brian Vibberts – assistant mix engineering (track 10)
- Big Tank – "Tainted Love" beat production (track 11)
- Tony Maserati – mixing (track 11)
- Jack Joseph Puig – mixing (track 12)
- Abe Laboriel, Jr. – drums (track 12)
- Alex Al – drums (track 12)
- Dean Nelson – drums (track 12)
- Greg Wells – production, engineering, programming, guitar, keys (track 14)
- Kara DioGuardi – production (track 14)
- Chris Lord-Alge – mixing (track 14)
- Steve MacMillan – engineering (track 14)
- Chris Steffen – engineering (track 14)
- Fabien Waltmann – additional programming (track 14)
- Brian Gardner – mastering

== Charts ==
=== Weekly charts ===
2005–2007 weekly chart performance
Chart	Peak position
Australian Albums (ARIA)	8
Australia Urban (ARIA)	1
Austrian Albums (Ö3 Austria)	13
Belgian Albums (Ultratop Flanders)	5
Belgian Albums (Ultratop Wallonia)	13
Canadian Albums (Nielsen SoundScan)	11
Croatian International Albums (HDU)	4
Czech Albums (ČNS IFPI)	9
Danish Albums (Hitlisten)	13
Dutch Albums (Album Top 100)	9
Finnish Albums (Suomen virallinen lista)	29
French Albums (SNEP)	23
German Albums (Offizielle Top 100)	6
Greek Albums (IFPI)	16
Hungarian Albums (MAHASZ)	6
Irish Albums (IRMA)	7
Italian Albums (FIMI)	23
Japanese Albums (Oricon)	28
Malaysian International Albums (RIM)	5
New Zealand Albums (RMNZ)	1
Norwegian Albums (VG-lista)	10
Polish Albums (ZPAV)	13
Portuguese Albums (AFP)	12
Scottish Albums (Official Charts)	12
South African Albums (RISA)	10
Spanish Albums (Promusicae)	27
Swedish Albums (Sverigetopplistan)	21
Swiss Albums (Schweizer Hitparade)	9
Taiwanese Albums (Five Music)	3
UK Albums (Official Charts)	7
UK R&B Albums (Official Charts)	1
US Billboard 200	5
US Top R&B/Hip-Hop Albums (Billboard)	7

=== Monthly charts ===
2005–2006 monthly chart performance
Chart	Position
South Korean International Albums (RIAK) (Note: attributed to charts for September 2005 and October 2006)	10

=== Year-end charts ===
2005 year-end chart performance
Chart	Position
UK Albums (OCC)	25
US Billboard 200	170
Worldwide Albums (IFPI)	34

2006 year-end chart performance
Chart	Position
Australian Albums (ARIA)	17
Australian Urban Albums (ARIA)	5
Austrian Albums (Ö3 Austria)	45
Belgian Albums (Ultratop Flanders)	7
Belgian Albums (Ultratop Wallonia)	45
Dutch Albums (MegaCharts)	16
French Albums (SNEP)	59
Hungarian Albums (MAHASZ)	2
German Albums (Offizielle Top 100)	16
Irish Albums (IRMA)	14
New Zealand Albums (RMNZ)	6
Swiss Albums (Schweizer Hitparade)	25
UK Albums (OCC)	28
US Billboard 200	12
US Top R&B/Hip Hop Albums (Billboard)	98
Worldwide Albums (IFPI)	12

2007 year-end chart performance
Chart	Position
Australian Albums (ARIA)	96
Australian Urban Albums (ARIA)	10
French Albums (SNEP)	126
Hungarian Albums (MAHASZ)	66
US Billboard 200	104

2008 year-end chart performance
Chart	Position
Australian Urban Albums (ARIA)	25

=== Decade-end charts ===
2000s decade-end chart performance
Chart	Position
UK Albums (OCC)	94
US Billboard 200	150

== Certifications ==
Certifications and sales
Region	Certification	Certified units/sales
Australia (ARIA)	3× Platinum	210,000^{^}
Austria (IFPI Austria)	Gold	15,000^{*}
Belgium (BRMA)	Platinum	50,000^{*}
Canada (Music Canada)	2× Platinum	200,000^{^}
Denmark (IFPI Danmark)	2× Platinum	40,000^{‡}
France (SNEP)	Gold	75,000^{*}
Germany (BVMI)	2× Platinum	400,000^{‡}
Greece (IFPI Greece)	Gold	10,000^{^}
Hungary (MAHASZ)	Gold	5,000^{^}
Ireland (IRMA)	2× Platinum	30,000^{^}
Netherlands (NVPI)	Platinum	80,000^{^}
New Zealand (RMNZ)	4× Platinum	60,000^{‡}
Norway (IFPI Norway)	Gold	20,000^{*}
Poland (ZPAV)	Platinum	20,000^{*}
Portugal (AFP)	Platinum	20,000^{^}
Russia (NFPF)	5× Platinum	100,000^{*}
Singapore (RIAS)	Platinum	10,000^{*}
South Korea	—	7,947
Switzerland (IFPI Switzerland)	Gold	20,000^{^}
United Kingdom (BPI)	4× Platinum	1,300,000
United States (RIAA)	4× Platinum	4,000,000^{‡}
Summaries
Europe (IFPI)	2× Platinum	2,000,000^{*}
Worldwide	—	9,000,000
^{*} Sales figures based on certification alone.^{^} Shipments figures based on certification alone.^{‡} Sales+streaming figures based on certification alone.

== Release history ==
Release dates and formats
Region	Date	Edition(s)	Format(s)	Label(s)	Ref.
United Kingdom	September 12, 2005	Standard	CD; digital download	Polydor	
Canada	September 13, 2005	Standard	CD	Universal	
United States	September 13, 2005	Standard	CD; digital download	A&M	
France	September 19, 2005	Standard	CD	Universal	
United States	September 20, 2005	Standard	Vinyl	A&M	
Australia	September 25, 2005	Standard	CD	Universal	
South Korea	September 27, 2005	Standard	CD	Universal	
Germany	September 30, 2005	Standard	CD	Universal	
Germany	October 19, 2005	Revised	CD; digital download	Universal	
Australia	October 24, 2005	Revised	CD	Universal	
Japan	November 2, 2005	Standard	CD	Universal	
Taiwan	November 3, 2005	Standard	CD	Universal	
United Kingdom	November 21, 2005	Special	CD; digital download	Polydor	
Sweden	November 22, 2005	Revised	CD	Universal	
Taiwan	June 30, 2006	Special	CD + DVD	Universal	
Germany	September 29, 2006	Tour	Double CD	Universal	
Australia	October 9, 2006	Tour	Double CD	Universal	
United Kingdom	October 9, 2006	Tour	Double CD	Polydor	
Taiwan	November 3, 2006	Tour	Double CD	Universal	
Various	May 8, 2026	20th anniversary	CD	Interscope; UM^{e}	(Note: attributed to retailers in Australia, Canada, France, Germany, Italy, and the United States)
Various	May 8, 2026	PCD Forever deluxe	Digital download; streaming	Interscope	
Various	May 8, 2026	Standard	Vinyl	Interscope; UM^{e}	(Note: attributed to retailers in Australia, Canada, France, Germany, the United Kingdom, and the United States)
Canada	May 8, 2026	20th anniversary	Vinyl	Universal	
United States	May 8, 2026	20th anniversary	Vinyl	Interscope; UM^{e}	

== See also ==
- List of number-one albums in 2006 (New Zealand)
- List of best-selling albums of the 2000s in the United Kingdom
