= The Pussycat Dolls =

American girl group and dance ensemble

- The Pussycat Dolls in 2026 (L–R): Nicole Scherzinger, Kimberly Wyatt, and Ashley Roberts

Background information
- Also known as: PCD
- Origin: Los Angeles, California, U.S.
- Genres: R&B; pop; dance-pop
- Years active: 2003–2010; 2019–2022; 2026–present
- Labels: Interscope; First Access
- Spinoffs: Girlicious; Paradiso Girls; G.R.L.
- Members: Ashley Roberts; Nicole Scherzinger; Kimberly Wyatt
- Past members: Carmit Bachar; Jessica Sutta; Melody Thornton
- Website: pcdforever.com

The Pussycat Dolls are an American girl group and dance ensemble, founded in Los Angeles, California, by choreographer Robin Antin in 1995 as a neo-burlesque troupe. At the suggestion of Jimmy Iovine, Antin decided to take the troupe mainstream as a pop group. Antin negotiated a record deal with Interscope Geffen A&M Records in 2003 turning the group into a music franchise comprising Nicole Scherzinger, Carmit Bachar, Ashley Roberts, Jessica Sutta, Melody Thornton and Kimberly Wyatt. Their debut, a promotional cover of "Sway," was featured on the soundtrack to the 2004 film Shall We Dance?.

The Pussycat Dolls achieved worldwide success with the singles "Don't Cha", "Stickwitu", "Buttons", and their multi-platinum debut album, PCD (2005). The group was plagued by internal conflict due to the emphasis on Scherzinger, its lead vocalist, and the subordinate treatment of the other members. Bachar's departure from the group preceded the release of their second and final studio album, Doll Domination (2008), which contains hit singles "When I Grow Up", "I Hate This Part", and "Jai Ho! (You Are My Destiny)". Following the completion of their 2009 world tour, the group went on hiatus and fully disbanded in 2010. The original recording line-up, minus Thornton, announced their reunion in 2019 with an upcoming tour and a new album. However, amidst increasing delays from the COVID-19 pandemic, along with breaches of contracts and logistical issues, the reunion tour was cancelled in 2022, leaving the group's fate uncertain, and a possible disband. Four years later, Roberts, Scherzinger and Wyatt returned as a trio.

The Pussycat Dolls brand diversified into merchandise, reality television programs, a Las Vegas act, product endorsements, spin-off recording groups (Girlicious, Paradiso Girls, G.R.L.), and other ventures. Billboard ranked the Pussycat Dolls as the 80th most successful musical act of the 2000s. The group has sold 55 million records worldwide, making them one of the best-selling girl groups of all time. In 2012, the Pussycat Dolls ranked 100th on VH1's 100 Greatest Women in Music, and as the tenth all-girl group.

== History ==
=== 1995–2002: Beginnings as burlesque dance troupe ===
Antin began exploring the idea of a modern burlesque troupe during 1990 with Carla Kama and Christina Applegate as performers. The troupe began to perform in 1995, with a repertoire of 1950s and 1960s popular music standards while dressed in lingerie or old-fashioned pin-up costumes. They secured a Thursday night residency at a Los Angeles nightclub, The Viper Room, where they stayed from 1995 to 2001. They appeared briefly in the 1998 films Matters of Consequence (dancing to Henry Mancini's "Hub Caps and Tail Lights", and Keely Smith's "When Your Lover has Gone"), and The Treat (directed by Jonathan Gems). From 1995 to 2003, there were numerous guest vocalists, and many changes to the dance personnel.

The troupe received wider press coverage during June 1999, when Playboy featured a Pussycat Dolls pictorial, featuring at least seven contemporary members posing semi-nude (Kasey Campbell, Kiva Dawson, Antonietta Macri, Erica Breckels, Katie Bergold, Erica Gudis and Lindsley Allen). Three years later, the Pussycat Dolls moved to The Roxy Theatre in West Hollywood. They were featured in magazines, television specials for MTV and VH1, ad campaigns, and films. Some of the Pussycat Dolls appeared in the 2003 film Charlie's Angels: Full Throttle, dancing to Mancini's "The Pink Panther Theme". They were also featured in Pink's "Trouble" music video. Along with Applegate, Christina Aguilera and Carmen Electra (who was the group's lead performer for many of their shows) the troupe was featured in a Maxim magazine shoot in 2002, which increased public interest in them (Aguilera later appeared in the similarly themed 2010 film Burlesque directed by Robin Antin's brother Steve). In November 2002, the Dolls appeared with Electra on the Late Show with David Letterman (dancing to "The Pink Panther Theme" and Squirrel Nut Zippers' "My Drag", and with Staci Flood singing "Big Spender"). In 2003, the troupe appeared alongside t.A.T.u. during the band's live performance of "All the Things She Said" / "Not Gonna Get Us" at the 2003 MTV Movie Awards.

Following their growing popularity, Interscope Geffen A&M Records music producers Jimmy Iovine and Ron Fair became involved with the group helping them to transform into a franchise after Gwen Stefani was asked to perform with the group. The former dance troupe evolved into a popular music recording group and became employees of Iovine's label Interscope Records. The only troupe members who remained after the re-casting process were Robin Antin, Carmit Bachar, Cyia Batten, Kasey Campbell, Ashley Roberts, Jessica Sutta and Kimberly Wyatt. Electra, when asked about her lack of involvement with the group's evolution into a popular music group, said, "I was part of [the Pussycat Dolls] for over two years and did every show with them [...] but financially, I couldn't become part of their new music project [...] It was a sacrifice I couldn't make."

=== 2003–2007: Recording group formation and PCD ===
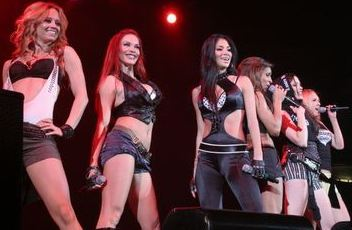
The Pussycat Dolls performing at the Tacoma Dome, Washington, on December 10, 2006

During 2003, Antin struck a joint venture with Interscope Records to develop the Pussycat Dolls into a brand, with Jimmy Iovine assigning the project to Ron Fair. Auditions followed suit, for a separate group which would not include celebrity members. Singers Nicole Scherzinger, Melody Thornton and Kaya Jones were recruited, joining Bachar, Roberts, Sutta, Wyatt, Batten, Campbell and Antin to form a new recording group. In February 2004, they performed "Big Spender" live at the MTV Asia Awards. In 2004, they recorded "We Went as Far as We Felt Like Going" for the Shark Tale soundtrack and recorded the single, "Sway" which is featured on the soundtrack of Shall We Dance?. The group briefly reunited with Electra for a guest performance at VH1 Divas 2004 where they performed "Tainted Love", "You Can Leave Your Hat On" (with Tom Jones) and "Girls on Film" before joining the headliners in a finale of "New Attitude" alongside Patti LaBelle. Kaya Jones left the group in September 2004, while Batten and Campbell left in January 2005. Antin would eventually shift into a strictly managerial and creative role.

The group's debut album, PCD, was released in September 2005 and sold three million copies in the United States. The album's lead single, "Don't Cha", was a number-one hit in various countries worldwide and became their signature song, reaching number two on the US Billboard Hot 100. It was followed by "Stickwitu", which became their second number-one single in the UK and New Zealand, and reached number five on the Hot 100. It was nominated for the Grammy Award for Best Pop Performance by a Duo or Group with Vocal. "Beep" also became a hit, reaching number one in Belgium and New Zealand, number two in the UK, and number thirteen in the US. The group became one of the top-selling artists in 2006, while the album appeared at number twelve on the Billboard 200-year-end chart that year.

The group was selected to perform for the introduction for ABC's coverage of the NBA. The Pussycat Dolls first opened for The Black Eyed Peas' Honda Civic Tour in North America. To further promote the album, Snoop Dogg was added to a remix of "Buttons", which became a worldwide hit reaching number three on the Billboard Hot 100, and top five elsewhere. The Pussycat Dolls embarked on their PCD World Tour with Rihanna as the opening act in the UK leg. One of the dates of the PCD World Tour was recorded and streamed via MSN Music. On August 8, the group were implicated by Islamic authorities over the act's concert performance, a stop of the PCD World Tour in Kuala Lumpur, Malaysia with the authorities taking offence and charging the group over "eye-popping attire" and "sexually suggestive stage routines". Absolute Entertainment, the company behind the group's appearance in Malaysia, was fined $3000 for the incident. Two final singles would be released from the album, "I Don't Need a Man" and "Wait a Minute", with the former becoming a moderate success and the latter becoming the group's fifth top 40 single on the Hot 100.

To further promote PCD, the Pussycat Dolls toured along with Danity Kane on Christina Aguilera's Back to Basics Tour in North America from February to May 2007. The success of the group's debut album brought them a wide array of spin-offs including a CW reality series, Pussycat Dolls Present: The Search for the Next Doll. The goal of the show was to add a seventh member to join them in future endeavors. Asia Nitollano was announced as the winner on April 24, however several months later, it was revealed that Nitollano had actually quit the group shortly after the finale aired. Following their performance at Live Earth, the group would only have occasional one-off performances for a while and went on a hiatus in mid-2007, during which Scherzinger attempted to launch a solo career. Plans for her debut solo album, Her Name is Nicole, would eventually be shelved after the release of four singles failed to make an impact on the charts. In August 2007, Sutta would be featured on the Paul van Dyke track "White Lies", which topped the US Billboard Hot Dance Singles chart.

=== 2008–2016: Doll Domination, disbandment, and reformation attempts ===
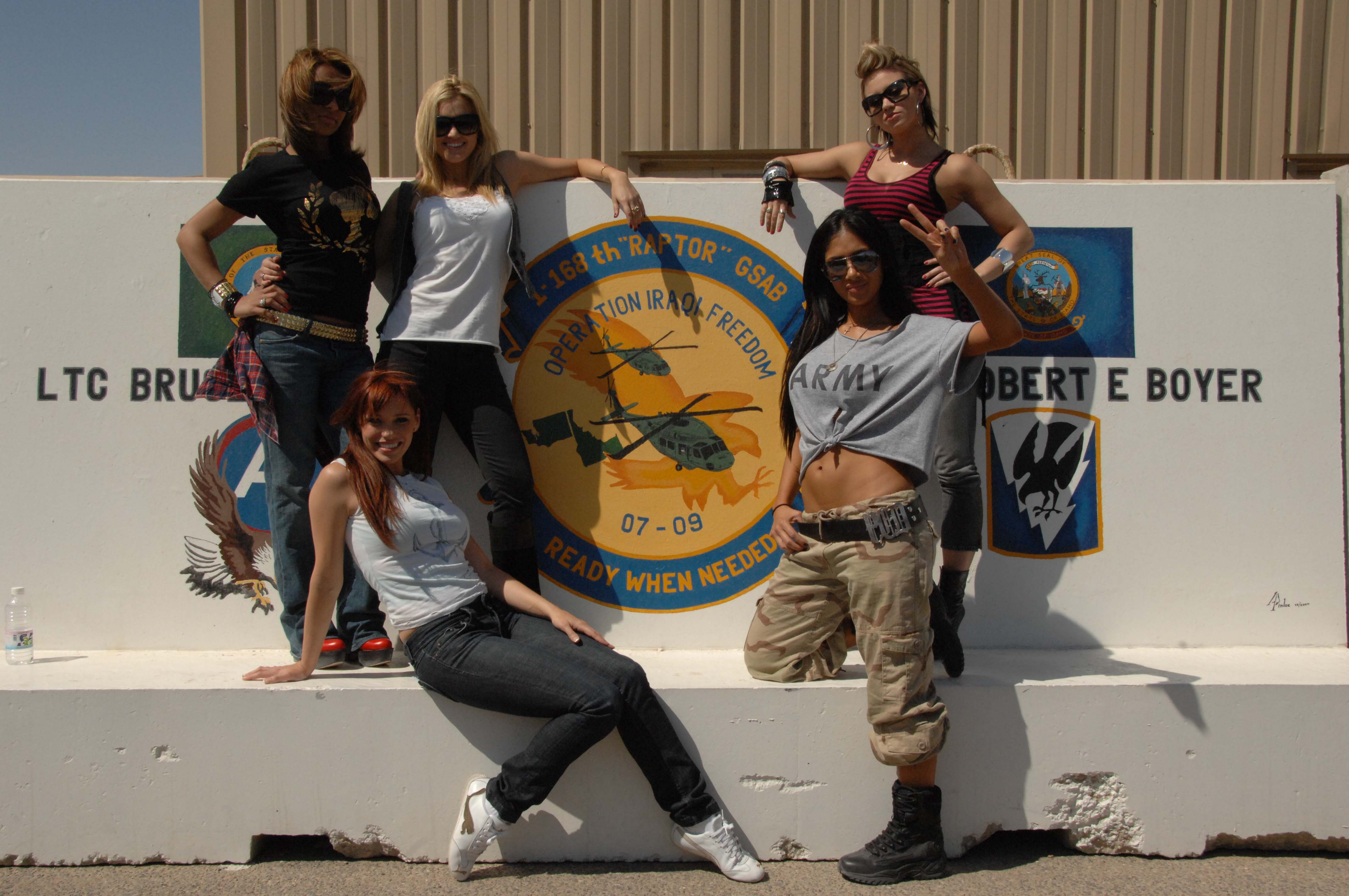
The Pussycat Dolls in front of an Operation Iraqi Freedom unit seal at Camp Buehring, Kuwait, on March 10, 2008

The Pussycat Dolls Present: Girlicious premiered on February 18, 2008, on The CW as a reality competition to form a new all-female pop group, Girlicious. The following month, Bachar's departure from the group was announced. At the time of her departure, she was the longest-serving member of the group. In a 2026 Instagram post, she stated that the label gave her an ultimatum to choose between the group and The Zodiac Show, a project she had spent years co-creating, leading her to leave the group and continue with the latter. On March 10, the group gave their first performance as a quintet at the Operation MySpace concert honoring US troops in Kuwait.

The group's second album, Doll Domination was released in September 2008 to mixed reviews. Though it peaked at number 4 in the UK Albums Chart and the Billboard 200 chart, it is considered a commercial disappointment. The label incorporated reworked tracks from Scherzinger's canceled solo project, Her Name Is Nicole, to reduce costs, including lead single "When I Grow Up". It peaked at number nine on the Billboard Hot 100. Its music video received six MTV Video Music Awards nominations, the most of any video that year, and won Best Dancing in a Video. The album spawned three additional singles in 2008: "Whatcha Think About That", "Out of This Club", and "I Hate This Part", the latter of which peaked at number 11 on the Billboard Hot 100. In December 2008, "Top of the World" was used as the opening theme of MTV's reality television series The City when it premiered.

In January 2009, the group embarked on their second headlining tour, the Doll Domination Tour, which grossed more than $14 million. (Note: The 23 shows reported to Billboard Boxscore grossed a total of $14.3 million.) Between its legs, they supported Britney Spears as the opening act on the North American leg of her The Circus Tour. In February, they contributed "Bad Girl" to the soundtrack of the film Confessions of a Shopaholic, and released a pop version of "Jai Ho", an A. R. Rahman song from the 2008 film Slumdog Millionaire, titled "Jai Ho! (You Are My Destiny)". While touring Europe, Scherzinger was asked to rewrite the song as a pop version, which resulted in crediting her as a featured artist. The decision caused tensions within the group, culminating in a public outburst by Thornton during one of their tour appearances. On the Billboard Hot 100, the song debuted at number 100 before rising to number 15 the following week, marking one of the largest single-week jumps in the chart's history.

Meanwhile, Doll Domination was reissued following stagnant sales, which included an EP subtitled The Mini Collection released in the UK. The reissues spawned "Hush Hush; Hush Hush", which originally credited Scherzinger as a featured artist. It became the group's sixth consecutive number-one single on the US Hot Dance/Club Songs chart. In May 2009, Sutta suffered a back injury during the group's first show in Sydney, forcing the group to perform as a four-piece for the remainder of the tour. Towards the end of the year, Thornton revealed that the group had gone on hiatus, while in December 2009 Antin acknowledged that Scherzinger would be joined by new members.

By February 2010, Roberts, Sutta, and Wyatt confirmed their departure from the group. with Wyatt later confirming that the group was fully disbanded. However, a May 2010 lineup showed Scherzinger surrounded by Kherington Payne, Vanessa Curry, Rino Nakasone-Razalan, and Jamie Lee Ruiz. The following month, Thornton confirmed her departure, with Scherzinger following suit in December 2010. Throughout 2011, Antin continued efforts to reconfigure the group with a new lineup, with former Paradiso Girls member Lauren Bennett confirmed as the first member in November. A GoDaddy commercial during Super Bowl XLVI revealed the lineup would include Curry, Paula Van Oppen, Chrystina Sayers, a former member of Girlicious, and Erica "Kiehl" Jenkins. Following further lineup changes and a shift in direction, the project was re-branded as G.R.L. in 2013, with Bennett and Van Oppen joined by Natasha Slayton, Simone Battle and Emmalyn Estrada.

=== 2017–2025: Reunion and legal dispute ===
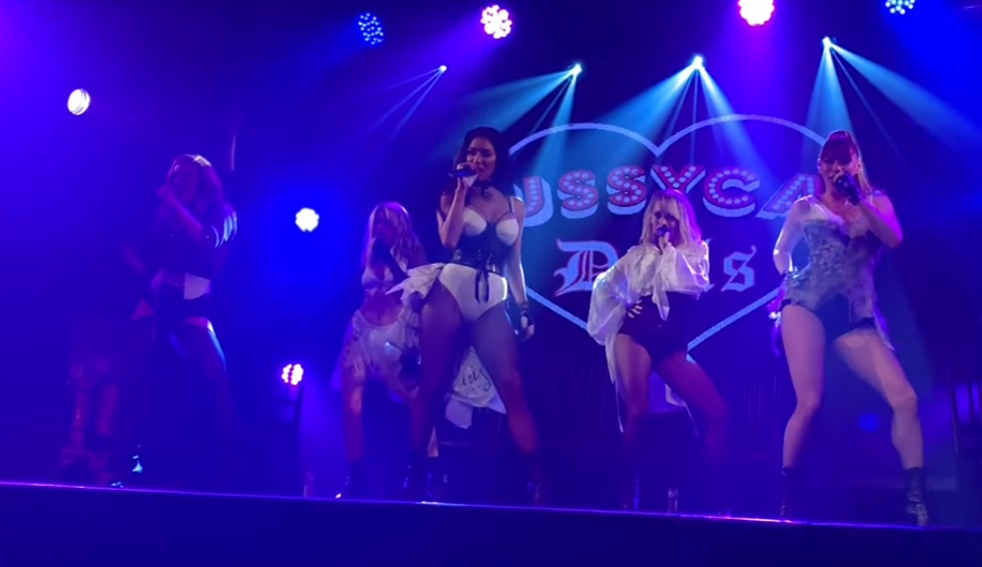
The Pussycat Dolls performing "React" live at G-A-Y for National Student Pride 2020

In August 2017, Antin and Scherzinger began discussing a potential reunion. By October, social media posts began hinting at a comeback, with Roberts, Sutta, Wyatt and Thornton reportedly involved, although it remained unclear whether Bachar would participate.. By April 2018, Wyatt confirmed that the group was expected to reform toward the end of the year, however Antin started developing a new-generation version of the group with Pia Mia as its front woman which never came into fruition. Wyatt later recalled being told that the original members would instead become "ambassadors of the brand,” a decision she described as "such a smack in the face."

In November 2019, Bachar, Roberts, Scherzinger, Sutta, and Wyatt announced their reunion and the Pussycat Dolls Tour, originally scheduled for April 2020. Thornton declined to rejoin to focus on solo projects. It was preceded with Scherzinger buying part of the rights from Antin. They first performed a medley of their previous singles and their new song "React" on the finale of The X Factor: Celebrity. British media regulator Ofcom received over 400 complaints from viewers who criticized the band's perceived provocative nature of their performance. The reunion propelled the group's re‑entry on Billboard's Social 50 chart, with 87,000 Wikipedia views (up 353%) and 26,000 Twitter mentions.

In January 2020, the group was featured Meghan Trainor's "Genetics" from her album Treat Myself. "React" was released in February 2020 through Access Records, marking their first independent single and their first new release in over a decade. A moderate success, it became group's eleventh top-forty single on the UK Singles Chart. Their subsequent performances on Ant and Dec's Saturday Night Takeaway and The One Show again prompted complaints, despite the comedic nature of the performance of the former and the latter drawing 119 viewer complaints despite working with the BBC to ensure a suitable pre-watershed routine. In March 2020, the COVID-19 pandemic forced the tour to be postponed.

In September 2021, Antin sued Scherzinger, citing a 2019 Memorandum of Understanding in which Scherzinger agreed to 45 shows for 32.5% of tour profits (with Roberts, Wyatt, Sutta, and Antin at 12.5% each and Bachar at 5%) and a 49% stake in new venture PCD Worldwide. Antin alleged Scherzinger later demanded a 75% share and full creative control, calling it "extortion" after promoter Live Nation had already advanced $600,000. Scherzinger's lawyer rejected the claims and accused Antin of mismanaging the Live Nation funds and forcing Scherzinger to self‑fund promotion and recordings for the failed tour. In January 2022, Scherzinger officially confirmed the tour's cancellation on an Instagram stories post. She cited "evolving circumstances surrounding the pandemic". Shortly after, Sutta and Bachar said they were "incredibly disappointed" to learn of the reunion tour's cancellation from Scherzinger's post, noting they had received no official notice. Despite calling the cancellation "the end of a chapter," Sutta and Bachar were optimistic and noting their sisterhood would live on. Antin also confirmed the tour's cancellation, saying they had all made personal and financial sacrifices. The dispute was resolved with undisclosed terms in November 2025.

=== 2026: Reunion as a trio ===
The Pussycat Dolls during the PCD Forever Tour in September 2026

In March 2026, Roberts, Scherzinger, and Wyatt reunited for the new single "Club Song" and announced the PCD Forever Tour, a world tour that began in June 2026; however, in May 2026 the group canceled all but one North American dates due to low ticket sales. Bachar and Sutta were not invited to the reunion and learned about it publicly. Bachar has said she doesn’t know why she was excluded, while Sutta has claimed the group saw her as a "liability" due to her support for Robert F. Kennedy Jr. and identification with MAGA, calling the reunion a "cash grab."

To celebrate the group's 20th anniversary, reissues of their two studio albums were released on May 6, 2026 with limited edition vinyls and CDs. PCD Forever included several new remixes of the Pussycat Dolls' singles, such as the viral remix by Showmusik of "Don't Cha". A remix album titled, PCD (Remixed), was released on April 17, 2026 and included the music video versions with the dance breaks of "Beep" and "Buttons".

== Other ventures ==
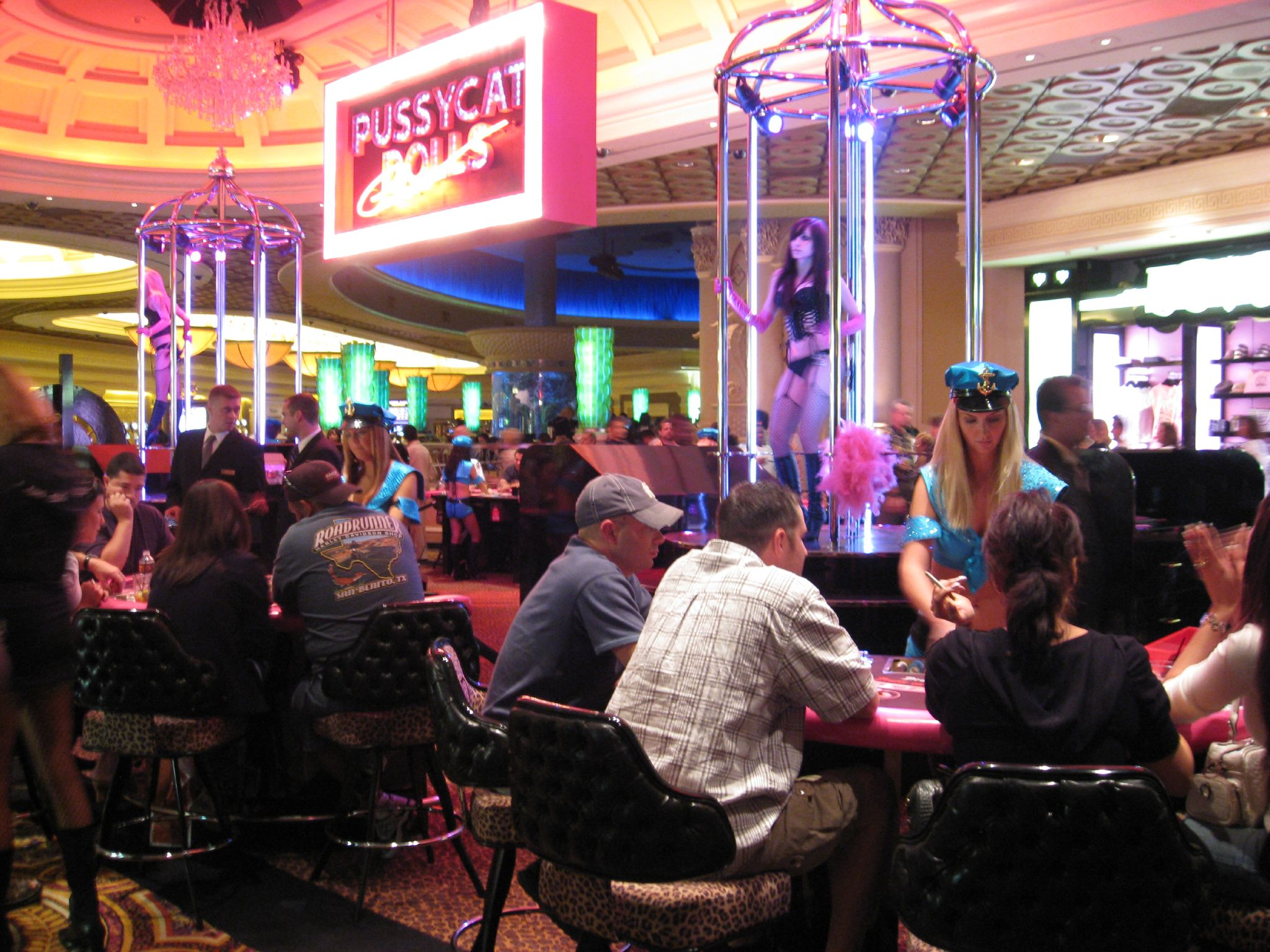
The PCD Casino located at the Caesars Palace in Las Vegas

The Pussycat Dolls had re-recorded "Don't Cha" in Simlish (as "Do Ba") for inclusion in the computer game The Sims 2: Pets. They also appeared in the video game Asphalt: Urban GT 2 released in November 2005, though their presence in-game was criticised by reviewers as a "marketing gimmick". In a merchandising agreement with Interscope in 2006, toy manufacturer Hasbro planned a line of dolls modeled after the group, reportedly to be marketed to six to nine-year-olds. Two organizations (Dads and Daughters and Campaign for a Commercial-Free Childhood) successfully lobbied Hasbro to scrap the plan, saying they felt the group would have been inappropriate for children due to the overtly sexual nature of the Pussycat Dolls' songs, videos and performances. Also in 2006, Interscope negotiated a deal with Estée Lauder for a Pussycat Dolls line of cosmetics under the Stila brand. In 2008, Robin Antin and the La Senza Corporation produced a line of Burlesque Pussycat Dolls-styled lingerie called "Shhh...by Robin Antin", and on December 15, Antin released Robin Antin's Pussycat Dolls Workout, which is composed of dancers from the Pussycat Doll Lounge Review including Chrystina Sayers from Girlicious, and features Nicole Scherzinger.

Caesars Palace in Las Vegas operated a resident live show at its "Pussycat Dolls Lounge", until closing the venue in February 2015. The burlesque-style show had female dancers inside a rhinestone-encrusted bathtub and on raised platforms, with female dealers, also wearing Pussycat Dolls-inspired T&A clothing, operating the blackjack and roulette tables in the venue.

== Artistry ==
"Beep"
A sample of "Beep" featuring vocals by Carmit Bachar. It is one of very few songs where the other members aside Scherzinger have solo verses.

Since the Pussycat Dolls were originally a burlesque dance troupe, Scherzinger and Thornton were the only members specifically hired for singing role when the group turned into a pop act in 2003. Bachar would also contribute vocals on their first album. Ron Fair stated that even though "there were some adequate voices in the original group," Scherzinger and Thornton were needed "to bring the ability." Despite Thornton taking the sole lead vocals for their debut performance as a music group at the 2004 MTV Asia Awards, Scherzinger eventually assumed the majority of the vocals on the group's recordings. As part of a Behind the Music special on Scherzinger's career, she claimed that she was responsible for singing both lead and background vocals on both of the group's studio albums, with hardly anything sung by her fellow members. Scherzinger, who said that she did not want to get in trouble for her revelations, explained that the other members did not even hear the tracks until they were finished.

== Public image and media coverage ==
=== Nicole Scherzinger as lead singer ===
Critics have taken a major swipe at the group for their overemphasis of Scherzinger. Margeaux Watson of Entertainment Weekly said, "there are two kinds of girl groups: those anchored by a superstar (The Supremes, Destiny's Child), and those made up of charismatic personalities endowed with limited individual gifts (Spice Girls, TLC). The Pussycat Dolls are neither—they're a brand, not a band. This follow-up to 2005's multi-platinum PCD finds lead Doll Nicole Scherzinger in the spotlight, and she's no Beyoncé. As for the others, well... can you name them? Do you even know how many there are?" The Telegraph's Adam White described the Pussycat Dolls as "pop's most embittered group" where the other members played the role of "glorified back-up dancers", and said that their 2006 performance at the American Music Awards "appeared to prove all was not well within the group's dynamic."

Kaya Jones, who initially auditioned as a vocalist for the group, said: "Nicole was always someone who wanted to be in the spotlight and would do pretty much anything to get it. [...] To call the other girls in the Pussycat Dolls 'window dressings' is a bit farfetched... every girl in the group was talented." In a 2014 interview with The Independent, Ashley Roberts claimed that she and her bandmates "were always told it was very much Nicole's project [...] we were the football team, and [Scherzinger] was the quarterback. You know, we weren't allowed to talk in interviews. We weren't even allowed in the studio sometimes." Kimberly Wyatt said in 2009: "Every video and stage performance that we've done, Nicole has been our leader. I wasn't in videos like I wanted and wasn't seen in the way I was hoping, which has been the same for all the other girls too." In an interview with Vibe, Thornton said: "For me, it's important for people to know that I do write... I got into the group to sing. That was made very clear to me. But it became more and more apparent what was going on. Roles were being minimised and minimised, and then by the time it got on the [road], it was very much like 'Y'all play your part and this is what it is.' It was tough because you don't want to s--- on your own opportunity."

=== 2019 reunion ===
The Pussycat Dolls being interviewed by Sunrise presenters David Koch and Natalie Barr after a performance on the show in Sydney, Australia, in March 2020

Following the group's reformation in 2019, Bachar addressed their prior split, "It wasn't a bitter ending. It was just a time in our lives where we all wanted to go and do our own thing and flourish. I went and had a family. We all stayed in touch." Roberts added, "Nicole is our lead singer and that is the way the band is constructed. We all have our place in the band and we each give something special individually, which fits like a puzzle—that's what makes the Pussycat Dolls." Scherzinger confirmed that she would take centre stage but that this was by mutual agreement, "It feels better than ever now I have evolved as a woman. It is actually the time for me to carry it. It's not even me—we all carry each other. We make each other stronger". Wyatt also confirmed that the other girls do get chances to record vocals, "Ultimately, The Pussycat Dolls has a lead singer and that is Nicole. Whenever I get an opportunity to sing and get in the studio and throw down some vocals, I'm so grateful." Speaking about the scrutiny that the group came under and the media attention, Wyatt said, "We want people to love it and focus on the amazing feat we have done together instead of trying to rip us apart."

=== Sexual image ===
Following their performance on The X Factor: Celebrity in November 2019, the group were accused of over-sexualisation and being raunchy for wearing sheer PVC outfits. Over 400 viewers complained to British broadcast regulator Ofcom. Despite a more muted performance on Ant & Dec's Saturday Night Takeaway in February 2020 that poked fun at their X Factor performance and featured some censorship, Ofcom continued to receive complaints, albeit a smaller amount, about the group. Scherzinger spoke out against the media and negative coverage, comparing the group's message to American singer-songwriter Lizzo, an advocate for body awareness: "If you have people like Lizzo leading the movement of accepting yourself, and they don't get any criticism, then why are we getting this criticism? When we perform, we perform from a place of passion and power. We're not floundering out there just trying to be cute. We come like warriors out there, and people feel empowered by that." Bachar addressed the criticism of their second performance by saying, "Being on Ant & Dec's show was hysterical; they are so good at what they do, and the way they made light of the whole censorship thing was amazing. It's great that we got to be silly with it and we had a blast." She supported early comments by Scherzinger that the intention and aims of the group's performances were always about empowerment, saying, "Everyone has an opinion on what we do, and while I think the power of a woman can be intimidating, it's all about the intention of our performances".

Wyatt has also defended the group's image by saying that it is an important message around female empowerment. During an appearance on The Morning Show, Wyatt talked about bringing her children to rehearsals: "[I love] teaching them what it means to be a Pussycat Doll and own your space as a female. I think it's a really positive and important message for my girls to see and understand what that means." Wyatt also stated during an interview with News.com.au that the reunion feels like unfinished business due to the Pussycat Dolls being misunderstood: "Luckily we have a presence online now and we can help people understand us, understand dance, understand what intention means as a performer ... there is still a conversation to be had, and the Pussycat Dolls are a little bit misunderstood by those who don’t seek to know who we are." This has also been echoed by Scherzinger who has since said, "We just want to say everything we do, we do it from a place of confidence ... only with the intention of inspiring and empowering each and every one of you ... And we just want to help some of you who are maybe struggling with stepping into your own power."

Referring to their provocative image, Sutta told The Daily Telegraph Australia that she felt that ageism is rife within the music industry but that times were changing: "You've got J-Lo at 50 who's looking as fabulous as ever, and Lizzo who is all about self-love and owning it. It's a new era, and there's no rules anymore." Scherzinger also noted that the group had matured and felt more confident than ever: "I mean, if there is a time to be more provocative, it's when you're grown up, when you're comfortable in your skin and you fully accept yourself, right?" In a piece titled "If You Don't Like The Pussycat Dolls or Lizzo, You Can Always Look Away" for The Guardian, Barbara Ellen discussed the interplay of ageism, sexism, and sizeism that female musicians face in the industry, comparing the negative media attention that the Pussycat Dolls received to that which was received by Lizzo for appearing in underwear on TikTok and by Jennifer Lopez for her performance at the Super Bowl LIV halftime show. Ellen wrote, "What is it about successful female artists doing their thing, on stage or on social media, that drives certain sectors of society crazy? And why is the sexism so often merged with ageism or sizeism, as if that makes the abuse they're meting out extra special and justified?"

Former member Kaya Jones has claimed that she and other members suffered sexual abuse, stating that they were forced to have sex with whoever their managers told them to, and even alleging that the group was merely a front for a prostitution ring. The other members of the group have denied her claims.

=== Sexist media coverage ===
Later in March 2020 during an interview with Network Ten's The Project, Scherzinger acknowledged that the costumes for the performance were provocative but also said, "We are women now and, like literally as we say, (our bums) were hanging out and it takes courage to be that. You know, it is vulnerable wearing as much as that. It takes a lot of courage to do it and we always do everything with confidence, with the intent of empowering others and all of our women out there and anyone who feels they relate to us". News AU and Junkee both criticised hosts of The Project for focusing on a perceived sexual nature of their dance moves and for making the interview with Scherzinger awkward. One of The Project's hosts, Waleed Aly, asked sexist questions such as whether the girls "fight over who wore the best tube tops and low-rise jeans?". Jared Richards (Junkee) said, "It's a mess, absolutely dismissive of Scherzinger as a person and The Pussycat Dolls as an act... While sex appeal is a big part of The Pussycat Dolls, a group which started as a burlesque performance, there's a right and a wrong way to ask about it." During the closing segment of the interview, Scherzinger was cut off as she said, "If you watch us, we dance with heart, we dance like warriors, we come from a real place of power..." As the music played, Scherzinger could be heard asking if the interview was about to cut to another segment. Viewers of the programme also slammed the hosts for the reductive nature of the interview. Music News reported that hundreds of viewers complained about the segment via Twitter.

=== Legal dispute over 2021 comeback ===
"There's some fighting going on between the creator Robin and Nicole, And so I have no idea what's going to happen but I'm trying to stay optimistic. I feel like we've built such an epic moment of this comeback performance and this comeback tour and all the fans are so excited around the world right along with us."

— Wyatt during an interview with Loose Women.

In September 2021, it was reported that Scherzinger was refusing to take part in the tour and had been subsequently sued by Robin Antin, founder of the Pussycat Dolls. The media reported that Scherzinger had originally agreed to 49% of the tour's earnings but was now refusing to take part unless this rose to 75% and included overall creative control. Documents filed at the Los Angeles Superior Court found that the basis of the agreement was a Memorandum of Understanding in which Scherzinger had committed to 45 shows, under terms that she would receive 32.5% of earnings from the tour; with Sutta, Roberts, Wyatt, and Antin receiving 12.5% and Bachar receiving 5%, reflecting her departure before the release of the group's second album, Doll Domination (2008). The legal dispute arose from Scherzinger wanting to negotiate the share of earnings by PCD Worldwide (a new business venture that would handle future earnings from the group and the brand) from the existing term of 49% to an increased 75% to reflect "opportunities she would have to forego to continue to engage in the partnership with Antin and the band as her reason for demanding a bigger share".

Scherzinger's lawyer released a counter-statement to Antin's claims. In the response were details of an advance of $600,000 from Live Nation that Antin had received to support the tour and now "won't or can't repay", as well as an accusation of Antin "trading on Nicole's name without her consent" and a public release of the group's financial arrangements for the tour. Scherzinger concluded that the lawsuit was "ludicrous and false" and that, under those circumstances, the tour cannot happen. Scherzinger further responded to the lawsuit with a counter-claim in August 2022 stating that Antin has been trying to orchestrate a comeback for the band as far back as 2017. According to papers filed by Scherzinger, it was on the promise of a comeback that Antin obtained funds from Live Nation and tried unsuccessfully to revive the Pussycat Dolls for a reunion with American singer Pia Mia as the group's lead. Mia was allegedly paid $100,000 for the arrangement which never came to fruition. Scherzinger and Antin reached an agreement for the group's 2019 tour which was subsequently delayed due to the COVID-19 pandemic. Scherzinger's position stated that the original 2019 agreement had lapsed and a new venture agreement was needed to proceed with the tour. Additional requested agreement terms included compensation, appropriate shares, and control over the group to recognise Scherzinger's personal and financial commitments to the reunion. According to Scherzinger, the Pussycat Dolls' promotional appearances on The X Factor: Celebrity and subsequent Australian performances had been financed and sourced by Scherzinger. The case against Antin alleges that Scherzinger's likeness was used to promote a tour for which there was no agreement in place and that Antin has appropriated funds from the Live Nation advance for activities that were not related to Pussycat Dolls business. These claims have been refuted by Antin's lawyers and will be subject to further litigation. In November 2024, the dispute was settled without further details being disclosed, although Scherzinger did go on to confirm she would be open to another reunion.

== Solo careers ==
After the group's initial disbandment in 2010, all members continued on their solo projects. Carmit Bachar would join musician Sammy Jay to become electronic music duo LadyStation, releasing the extended play Voices in 2015. She would later release her first solo single in 2017, "It's Time". In 2010, Kimberly Wyatt joined a musical duo called Her Majesty & the Wolves and released their debut album on July 11, 2011. That same year, she was featured on the Aggro Santos song "Candy" which became a UK top five hit. In June 2011, Melody Thornton announced plans to have her debut studio album released sometime in 2012. On March 15, 2012, she released her first mixtape, "P.O.Y.B.L", which includes five covers and four original songs written by Thornton. On June 3, 2011, Jessica Sutta announced that she had signed to Hollywood Records, and her first single, "Show Me", peaked at number one on the Hot Dance Club Songs in the United States. However, her planned debut studio album, Sutta Pop, was shelved and she later left the label. Using the name J Sutta, she released the mixtape Feline Resurrection in 2016. Later, she released her debut studio album, I Say Yes, on March 3, 2017. On November 7, 2012, it was confirmed that Ashley Roberts would compete in the twelfth series of the British reality show I'm a Celebrity...Get Me Out of Here! airing on ITV. In January 2013, Roberts became a member of the ice panel for the final two series of British skating show Dancing on Ice on ITV. In June 2014, Roberts announced that her debut album, titled Butterfly Effect, would be released on September 1, 2014.

Lead member Nicole Scherzinger continued her solo career after putting it on hold to release the group's second and final studio album. In March 2010, it was announced that Scherzinger would be a celebrity contestant on the tenth season of Dancing with the Stars, partnering with Derek Hough, which she won. In March 2011, Scherzinger released her debut studio album, Killer Love, and experienced moderate success in certain territories. The album included second single, "Don't Hold Your Breath", which debuted atop the UK Singles Chart. The album's third single, "Right There", was remixed featuring 50 Cent and released as the lead single for the American version of Killer Love. It peaked at number 39 on the Billboard Hot 100 and reached the top ten in Australia, Ireland, New Zealand, Romania, Scotland, and the United Kingdom. In May 2011, Scherzinger was hired as a judge on the first season of the American version of The X Factor, alongside Simon Cowell, Paula Abdul, and L.A. Reid. After her stint in the United States, Scherzinger joined The X Factor UK for its ninth series as the fourth permanent judge. In May 2013, Scherzinger was confirmed as a returning judge for the tenth series of The X Factor UK. In January 2014, it was reported that Scherzinger left Interscope Records and signed a multi-million dollar recording deal with Sony Records. Scherzinger's album, titled Big Fat Lie, was released in October 2014.

Scherzinger gained critical acclaim for her work as Norma Desmond in the 2023 revival of Sunset Boulevard at the Savoy Theatre. Matt Wolf of The New York Times hailed her performance as "career-defining", writing, "Scherzinger finds a predatory allure in the character that is both captivating and chilling." For her performance in the West End, Scherzinger received the 2023 Evening Standard Theatre Award for Best Musical Performance and the 2024 Laurence Olivier Award for Best Actress in a Musical. In 2024, she made her Broadway debut in the same role in the transfer of the production to the St. James Theatre, which later earned her multiple awards including the Tony Award for Best Actress in a Musical.

== Legacy ==
With only two studio albums, the band became the best-selling girl group of the 2000s digital era and fourth of all time. Since the group's formation in 2003, the Pussycat Dolls have sold 55 million records worldwide. VH1 included the Pussycat Dolls one of the 100 Greatest Women in Music in 2012. Billboard also ranked the group as one of the best-selling acts of the 2000–2009 decade. The Pussycat Dolls are one of the best-selling girl groups of all time. James Montgomery of MTV commented that the success of the group's debut album, PCD, made the group "the heirs to the Spice Girls' bedazzled throne". PCD has sold over 1,246,769 copies in the United Kingdom, making it the best-selling American girl group release there, also becoming one of the best-selling albums of the 2000–2009 decade. The success of the group's debut album led them to become the most successful girl group in the world since the Spice Girls in the late 1990s.

The Pussycat Dolls have a string of hit singles. "Don't Cha" has sold more than 3 million copies in the United States, making it the best-selling song of all time by a female group there, and 6 million worldwide, becoming one of the best-selling singles of all time. It was included on VH1's list of Greatest Songs of '00s. The Official Charts Company ranked "Don't Cha" and "Jai Ho! (You Are My Destiny)" at number 5 and 39, respectively, on the list of the most downloaded songs since its launch. The latter created a milestone for the Billboard Hot 100 with a biggest single-week upward movement in the lifetime of the chart at the time in March 2009. "Jai Ho! (You are My Destiny)" and "Don't Cha" are two of the best-selling songs in Australia and in the United Kingdom as of July 2009. "Don't Cha" was also featured on VH1's I Love the 2000s. The music video for "Don't Cha" is noted for being "iconic" among girl groups. Andrew Unterberger of Billboard said, "It was inevitable that the song and video would become massive, and become massive they did, with the song heating up the Hot 100 chart and the video establishing the group as mainstays on MTV for many subsequent (though not quite as memorable) videos to come." "Buttons" is also regarded as one of the sexiest videos ever by media outlets AOL Music, MuchMusic, Fuse, and VH1. With "Buttons" surpassing two million downloads, the Pussycat Dolls became the first all-female group in digital history to have three singles—along with "Don't Cha" and "When I Grow Up"—cross the two-million mark in digital sales.

=== Spin-offs ===
A second season of Pussycat Dolls Present commenced as Pussycat Dolls Present: Girlicious, which tried to find women to become part of a new three-member, all-female group Girlicious. Interscope Records formed a London-based spin-off group called Paradiso Girls through an open audition. In 2010, they were dropped and further promotion of their planned debut album, Crazy Horse, was cancelled, dissolving the group. Throughout 2011 and 2012 Antin spoke of casting new members for the Pussycat Dolls with various names mentioned. In February 2013, Antin announced that she had scrapped plans for the new line-up of replacement PCD members and would instead form a new group who will be the "next generation". They eventually became known as G.R.L. and released their debut single "Vacation" on June 16 as a B-side track to pop singer Britney Spears' single "Ooh La La".

== Discography ==
- PCD (2005)
- Doll Domination (2008)

== Tours ==
Headlining

- PCD World Tour (2006–2007)
- Doll Domination Tour (2009)
- PCD Forever Tour (2026-2027)

Supporting act

- Black Eyed Peas – Honda Civic Tour (2006)
- Christina Aguilera – Back to Basics Tour (2007)
- Britney Spears – The Circus Starring Britney Spears (2009)

== See also ==
- List of awards and nominations received by The Pussycat Dolls
- List of songs recorded by The Pussycat Dolls
- List of best-selling girl groups
- Little Miss Nasty
