= Wait a Minute (The Pussycat Dolls song) =

2006 single by the Pussycat Dolls

Single by the Pussycat Dolls featuring Timbaland

from the album PCD
- Released: October 16, 2006
- Studio: Hit Factory Criteria (Miami)
- Length: 3:42
- Label: A&M; Interscope
- Songwriters: Timothy Mosley; Keri Hilson; Craig Longmiles
- Producers: Ron Fair; Timbaland

The Pussycat Dolls singles chronology
"I Don't Need a Man" (2006)	"Wait a Minute" (2006)	"When I Grow Up" (2008)

Timbaland singles chronology
"Promiscuous" (2006)	"Wait a Minute" (2006)	"Ice Box" (2006)

Music video
- "Wait a Minute" on YouTube

"Wait a Minute" is a song recorded by American girl group the Pussycat Dolls for their debut studio album, PCD (2005). It features a guest appearance from Timbaland, who served as the song's producer and co-wrote it with Keri Hilson and Craig Longmiles. Lyrically, the song showcases the artists flirting and committing to a playful give and take, highlighting the differences between the two sexes. In the United States, A&M Records and Interscope Records released the song to contemporary hit radio on October 16, 2006, as the fifth single of the album in the US and the sixth and final in international territories. An accompanying music video was directed by Marc Webb features the Pussycat Dolls performing choreography on a subway car and city streets. It was nominated for a MuchMusic Video Award and a MOBO Award.

"Wait a Minute" received generally positive reviews from music critics, who complimented Timbaland's contributions and highlighted it as one of the album's standout tracks. Commercially, the song achieved top-ten placements in Finland, the Netherlands, and Romania, where it reached number one. It peaked at number 28 on the Billboard Hot 100 and achieved moderate success on radio charts across North America. It reached the top-thirty in Australia, Belgium (Flanders), Denmark, New Zealand, Slovakia, and Sweden.

== Background and composition ==
The Pussycat Dolls originated as a burlesque dance ensemble founded by choreographer Robin Antin in 1993. Over the years, the troupe gained popularity which resulted in Antin strucking a deal with Jimmy Iovine—then president of Interscope Geffen A&M Records—to develop the group into a brand and create a pop girl group, with Iovine assigning the project to producer Ron Fair. Iovine considered the group as one of the "label's high-priority projects" and began enlisting various producers and songwriters to "ensure [a] maximum radio friendl[y]" sound for the debut album, PCD (2005), including Timbaland. Through her connections with Timbaland, singer-songwriter Keri Hilson was also enlisted to write songs for the group. Their collaboration resulted in "Physical" and "Wait a Minute", both of which were slated to be included on PCD; however, only the latter was included on the album. "Physical" was later intended to be included on Her Name Is Nicole, the shelved solo album by the group's lead singer Nicole Scherzinger.

"Wait a Minute" was written and produced by Timbaland, with additional writing by Hilson and Craig Longmiles. Longmiles' contribution was not noted on the physical copies of PCD, but was credited on digital editions of the album. The song is composed in 4/4 time in the key of B minor, with a moderate hip-hop groove of 144 beats per minute and a looping chord progression of Bm–D–Bm–D–Bm, while using "sassy handclaps". The artists' vocal range spans from A_{3} to F_{5}, with the harmonies being described as "close-clustered and tightly executed". In their duet, the Pussycat Dolls and Timbaland have a humorous give and take, highlighting the differences between the two sexes. Timbaland, who was noted for his awkward flirting, fails to impress Scherzinger. Hilson handled the vocal production as well, while Fair provided incidental production. The artists' vocals were recorded at The Hit Factory Criteria in Miami by Marcella Araica and Demacio "Demo" Castellon. The song was mixed by Dave Pensado and Fair.

== Release and promotion ==
In the United States, A&M Records and Interscope Records released the song to contemporary hit radio on October 16, 2006, as the fifth single of PCD. In territories outside the US, where "I Don't Need a Man " was promoted, the song was released as the sixth single in early 2007. Directed by Marc Webb, its accompanying music video was filmed in sometime in October 2006. Throughout the video, the Pussycat Dolls perform choreography on a subway car and city streets. The music video received nominations for Best International Group Video at the 2007 MuchMusic Video Awards and Best Video at the 2007 MOBO Awards. On December 7, 2005, the Pussycat Dolls performed four songs, including "Wait a Minute" at the annual KIIS-FM Jingle Ball at the Shrine Auditorium. Timbaland joined the group at the MTV Goes Gold: New Year's Eve 2007 special to perform "Wait a Minute". The group also performed the song during their PCD World Tour (2006–2007), Christina Aguilera's Back to Basics Tour (2007), and their Doll Domination Tour (2009).

== Reception ==
=== Critical ===
"Wait a Minute" received generally positive reviews from music critics. In his consumer guide for MSN Music, Robert Christgau selected "Wait a Minute" as one of the highlights of its parent album PCD. Writing for the Tampa Bay Times, Sean Daly acknowledged "Wait a Minute" as PCD's best song, feeling it was "perfect for the dance floor". Stephen Thomas Erlewine of AllMusic indicated the song as one of the standout tracks of the album. Similarly, Nick Butler from Sputnikmusic deemed the song "another highlight track". Lisa Haines of the BBC wrote the song is "perfect for singing along to with a handy hairbrush". Popjustice found "Wait a Minute" to be better than the previous single releases of the album. Curt Fields of The Washington Post complimented Timbaland as a producer for "his quirky percussive touch and stuttering beats" and described the song as a "prime example" of a "[song] that had [listeners] turning up the volume". Casey Dolan of the Los Angeles Times complimented the frivolous nature of the song and distinguished the vocal performance as "the outstanding feature of the track". On the contrary, Andrew Mueller of The Guardian opined "Wait a Minute" was a "tiresome, painfully contrived irritant" that "becomes more oppressively depressing than any war or famine presently in progress". He went on to compare its lyrics to a "daytime talk show dialogue".

=== Commercial ===
"Wait a Minute" achieved top-ten placements in Finland (3), the Netherlands (7), and Romania (1). In the lattermost country, the song became the Pussycat Dolls' second number-one on the Romanian Top 100 after "Don't Cha" peaked the summit in 2005. On the US Billboard Hot 100, the song debuted at number 77 on the issue dated November 25, 2006. The song went on to peak at number 28 on January 13, 2007, and spent a total of 17 weeks on the chart. Additionally, "Wait a Minute" appeared on mainstream radio charts in North America, peaking at numbers 19 and 23 on Canada CHR/Top 40 and the US Mainstream Top 40, respectively. The song entered top-thirty in Australia (16), Germany (27), Sweden (27), Slovakia (30). Furthermore, in Austria (49), Belgium (Flanders) [18], New Zealand (24), and Switzerland (41), the song become the group's lowest-charting song on its respective charts, while it failed to enter the top 100 of the UK Singles Chart, peaking at number 108.

== Track listings and formats ==
- Australian and German CD single
1. "Wait a Minute" (album version) – 3:42
2. "Wait a Minute" (Timbaland version) – 3:56
- German maxi CD single
1. "Wait a Minute" (album version) – 3:42
2. "Wait a Minute" (Timbaland version) – 3:56
3. "Wait a Minute" (Timbaland instrumental) – 3:04
4. "Wait a Minute" (music video)

== Credits and personnel ==
Credits adapted from the liner notes of PCD and Tidal.

Recording

- Recorded at The Hit Factory Criteria (Miami, Florida)

Personnel

- Marcella Araica – recording
- Demacio "Demo" Castellon – recording
- Ariel Chobaz – assistant mix engineer
- Ron Fair – incidental producer, mix engineer
- Gary Grant – horns
- Jerry Hey – horn arrangement, horns
- Tal Herzberg – engineer, Pro Tools
- Dan Higgins – horns
- Keri Hilson – songwriter, vocal producer
- Craig Longmiles – songwriter
- Timothy "Timbaland" Mosley – featured artist, songwriter, producer
- Dave "Hard Drive" Pensado – mix engineer
- Bill Reichenbach – horns

== Charts ==
=== Weekly charts ===
Weekly peak performance for "Wait a Minute"
Chart (2006–2007)	Peak position
Australia (ARIA)	16
Australian Urban (ARIA)	6
Austria (Ö3 Austria Top 40)	49
Belgium (Ultratop 50 Flanders)	18
Belgium (Ultratip Bubbling Under Wallonia)	2
Canada CHR/Top 40 (Billboard)	19
Denmark (Tracklisten)	28
Finland (Suomen virallinen lista)	3
Germany (GfK)	27
Hungary (Dance Top 40)	12
Hungary (Editors' Choice Top 40)	15
Lithuania (EHR)	1
Netherlands (Single Top 100)	17
Netherlands (Dutch Top 40)	7
Romania (Romanian Top 100)	1
Russia Airplay (TopHit)	32
New Zealand (Recorded Music NZ)	24
Slovakia Airplay (ČNS IFPI)	30
Sweden (Sverigetopplistan)	25
Switzerland (Schweizer Hitparade)	41
UK Singles (OCC)	108
US Billboard Hot 100	28
US Pop Airplay (Billboard)	23

=== Year-end charts ===
2007 year-end performance for "Wait a Minute"
Chart (2007)	Position
Australian Urban (ARIA)	32
Hungary (Dance Top 40)	95
Netherlands (Dutch Top 40)	56
Romania (Romanian Top 100)	24
Russia Airplay (TopHit)	198

== Certifications ==
Certifications for "Wait a Minute"
Region	Certification	Certified units/sales
Denmark (IFPI Danmark)	Gold	45,000^{‡}
United States (RIAA)	Platinum	1,000,000^{‡}
^{‡} Sales+streaming figures based on certification alone.

== Release history ==
Release dates and formats for "Wait a Minute"
Region	Date	Format(s)	Label(s)	Ref.
United States	October 16, 2006	Contemporary hit radio	A&M; Interscope	
Italy	January 26, 2007	Digital download	Universal Music	
Netherlands	January 26, 2007	Digital download	Universal Music	
Spain	January 26, 2007	Digital download	Universal Music	
Australia	February 26, 2007	CD	Universal Music	
Germany	March 16, 2007	CD	Universal Music	
Germany	March 16, 2007	Maxi CD	Universal Music	

== See also ==
- List of Romanian Top 100 number ones of the 2000s
