= Stickwitu =

2005 single by The Pussycat Dolls

Single by the Pussycat Dolls

from the album PCD
- B-side: "Santa Baby"
- Released: September 26, 2005
- Genre: Pop; R&B
- Length: 3:27
- Label: A&M; Interscope
- Songwriters: Franne Golde; Kasia Livingston; Robert Palmer
- Producer: Ron Fair

The Pussycat Dolls singles chronology
"Don't Cha" (2005)	"Stickwitu" (2005)	"Beep" (2006)

Music video
- "Stickwitu" on YouTube

"Stickwitu" is a song recorded by American girl group the Pussycat Dolls for their debut studio album, PCD (2005). It was written by Franne Golde, Kasia Livingston and Robert Palmer and produced by Ron Fair. A pop and R&B ballad with soul influences, the song finds the group celebrating monogamous relationships, with music critics drawing comparisons to fellow girl groups Cover Girls, Sweet Sensation, and the Spice Girls. It was released as the album's second single on September 26, 2005, by A&M Records and Interscope Records.

Upon its release, "Stickwitu" received mixed reviews from critics, with some complimenting the production and vocal performances, while others criticized its placement on the album. Commercially, "Stickwitu" was a chart success, peaking at number five on the US Billboard Hot 100, as well as becoming the Pussycat Dolls' second consecutive number-one in New Zealand and the United Kingdom, and peaking atop the US Mainstream Top 40, making the Pussycat Dolls the first girl group since Destiny's Child in 2001 to do so. It was certified triple platinum by the Recording Industry Association of America (RIAA) for sales of three million units.

Nigel Dick directed the accompanying music video for "Stickwitu", with principal photography taking place in various places around Los Angeles, including the Orpheum Theatre. With the aim to make each member more identifiable, the music video depicts a day of the group's tour life. To further promote the single, the Pussycat Dolls performed the song during several televised appearances, and in their concert tours PCD World Tour (2006–2007) and Doll Domination Tour (2009). The song received a Grammy Award nomination for Best Pop Performance by a Duo or Group with Vocals and was regarded as one of the greatest girl group songs of all time by Billboard.

== Development and recording ==
The Pussycat Dolls began as a burlesque dance ensemble founded by choreographer Robin Antin in 1993. As their popularity grew, Antin partnered with then–Interscope Geffen A&M Records chairman Jimmy Iovine to turn the act into a pop girl group, with producer Ron Fair overseeing the transition. Iovine considered the group as one of the "label's high-priority projects," and began enlisting various producers and songwriters to "ensure [a] maximum radio friendl[y]" sound for the debut album, PCD (2005). Following the breakthrough success of "Don't Cha," Fair recalled that the group "scrambled" and completed recording the album within 30 days at the Record Plant in Hollywood, Los Angeles.

Meanwhile, songwriter Franne Golde discovered a late-stage opportunity to contribute a song to the group's debut album. She collaborated with Kasia Livingston and Robert Palmer during a writing session that initially proved challenging as their first track failed to come together. However, late at night, just as they were about to end the session, Palmer picked up his guitar and began playing a new chord progression, which led to the creation of the demo. Golde was initially hesitant to pitch it to the group as the album was considered complete, but after her husband's persuasion, the demo was left at the studio with a post-it note for Fair. Fair confirmed the group's album was complete but deduced he and Iovine were still interested the song for Mary J. Blige who later passed it on as she found it "too pop" for her styling. After Blige left the studio, lead singer Nicole Scherzinger walked in, heard the song, and immediately wanted to record it, despite the group's album being supposedly finished. Production was overseen by Fair with co-producer Tal Herzberg, who engineered the song with Mike Hogue's assistance. Fair also arranged and conducted the strings, which were recorded by Allen Sides. The group's vocals were recorded by Mike "Angry" Eleopoulos. The song was mixed by Peter Mokran at the Record Plant.

== Composition and release ==
"Stickwitu"
An 21-second sample of the chorus featuring the line "I'ma stickwitu forever", which is "ideal for the text-messaging age", according to Sanneh.

At 3 minutes and 27 seconds long, "Stickwitu" is a pop ballad that incorporates elements of soul. It is built around a simple melody, with strings that "sigh" and beats that "slide", periodically dropping out and returning, growing and shrinking in a way that, as Kelefa Sanneh of The New York Times observed, gently confounds expectations. Critics noted the song is reminiscent to works of fellow girl groups Cover Girls, Sweet Sensation, and the Spice Girls. (Note: Attributed from Billboard's Chuck Taylor and musicOMH's Tony Heywood:) Scherzinger was noted for using the "thin end of [her] alto-into-soprano register". Lyrically, "Stickwitu" celebrates monogamous relationships. Tony Heywood of musicOMH noted describes the lyrics as "platitudes to domestic bliss," suggesting that the narrator stays with her partner because "nobody gonna love me better" and "you know how to ’preciate me," emphasizing comfort and appreciation rather than exploring deeper feelings.

In July 2005, MTV News reported that "Beep", featuring will.i.am, was being considered to be released as the album's second single. Fair doubted a similar song like "Beep" could replicate it's success and pushed for "Stickwitu," as he felt it would showcase a different side of the group and establish longevity. Scherzinger reinforced Fair's descision, acknowledging that some were skeptical about the group's range. Jeff Leeds of The New York Times noted that the single’s release coincided with the label striking a deal with toymaker Hasbro to produce a line of dolls modeled on the group. According to Leeds, the song was designed to appeal to a broader, younger audience, and subsequently received airplay on outlets such as Radio Disney.

It was serviced to US contemporary hit radio on September 26, 2005, via A&M Records and Interscope Records. It was issued in various physical formats that coupled the album version with additional material, including the B‑side "Santa Baby," an R&B remix featuring Avant, and in some editions the accompanying music video. "Santa Baby" features members Carmit Bachar, Jessica Sutta and Ashley Roberts on lead vocals. The Avant remix was released digitally in December 2005, was later included on the tour edition of PCD as well as on Avant’s album Director (2006).

== Critical reception and accolades ==
Jim Carroll of The Irish Times praised "Stickwitu" as "one of the best pop ballads of recent years." Chuck Taylor of Billboard was surprised it followed "Don't Cha," praising its "beautifully sung, craftily produced and refreshingly gimmick-free" qualities and "catchy" chorus unlike anything else on air. Kelefa Sanneh of The New York Times felt it "might be even better" than "Don't Cha," while Paul Scott of Stylus Magazine preferred it to "Don't Cha" for avoiding irritation, calling it a pretty, aimless slow jam that wisely stays restrained rather than going over-the-top. Linda McGee of RTÉ noted it reveals "the real intensity of spirit in the music of the [group]."

By contrast, John Murphy of musicOMH called "Stickwitu" the "compulsory soulful ballad" and, though "nicely sung" with strong harmonies, felt it "doesn’t particularly stick in the mind" and argued that any of its songs could have been recorded by any generic US pop-soul act, arguing the group lacks a distinctive vocal personality. Spence D. of IGN similarly felt the mood was "severely truncated" and described the song as being a familiar-sounding slow jam and noting that, while Scherzinger’s voice is pleasing, she never offers a true signature sound. Stephen Thomas Erlewine of AllMusic also criticized its placement writing, "sappiness undercuts the joyous carnal celebration" of the album’s first three tracks. Sal Cinquemani of Slant Magazine felt the album’s ballads, including "Stickwitu," are "sufficiently un-icky" but still difficult to take seriously when followed by a song that begs a man to "loosen up my buttons." Nathan Rabin from The A.V. Club described it as a "saccharine, sleepy" ballad.

"Stickwitu" was nominated for Best Pop Performance by a Duo or Group with Vocals at the 49th Annual Grammy Awards (2007). Its remix featuring Avant was nominated for Best R&B/Soul Single – Group, Band or Duo at the 2007 Soul Train Music Awards. In May 2007, the song won a BDS Certified Spin Award for receiving 300,000 radio spins in the United States, and was listed as one of the recipients of the BMI Pop Award. In 2017, it was placed at number 68 on Billboard's list "100 Greatest Girl Group Songs of All Time: Critics’ Picks", with Taylor Weatherby calling it "one of the most heartfelt ballads in modern girl group history" that still makes "couples everywhere sway along and fall deeper in love."

== Commercial performance ==
"Stickwitu" debuted on the US Billboard Hot 100 on October 22, 2005, and peaked at number five on December 31, spending a total of 26 weeks on the chart. It also became the group's first number-one single on the Mainstream Top 40, where it spent two weeks atop the chart, making the Pussycat Dolls the first girl group to reach the summit since Destiny's Child in 2001. On the Hot R&B/Hip-Hop Songs chart, the Avant remix debuted at number 73 with 3.6 million audience impressions (a 37% increase) and eventually peaked at number 63. The Recording Industry Association of America (RIAA) awarded the song a platinum certification for one million certified master ringtone units, followed by a three-times platinum certification in 2026 for three million combined sales and on-demand streaming units.

On the UK Singles Chart, "Stickwitu" debuted at number one on the week of December 10, 2005 with first-week sales of 43,989 copies, becoming the group's second consecutive UK chart-topper after "Don't Cha" had entered at number one 12 weeks earlier. Despite a 28.8% decline to 31,311 copies in its second week, it secured a second straight week at the summit, finishing 25.9% ahead of nearest challenger Madonna's "Hung Up" (24,874 sales) but posting the lowest weekly total for a number-one single in 14 weeks and contributing to the group's total of five weeks at number one in 2005, behind only Tony Christie's "(Is This the Way to) Amarillo," which spent seven weeks at the top. On the Official Charts Company's (OCC) 2026 rundown of the group's biggest UK singles, compiled by Rob Copsey, the song ranks as the group's fifth-largest hit with 677,000 equivalent units, while its B-side "Santa Baby" also makes the 2026 list at number 19. It's also ranked 74th on the OCC's 2019 chart of the biggest girl group singles of the previous 25 years. It was certified platinum by the British Phonographic Industry (BPI). The single also topped the New Zealand chart for two non-consecutive weeks and was certified double platinum by Recorded Music NZ (RMNZ).

Across Europe, the song achieved notable chart success, reaching number two on the European Hot 100 Singles and in Ireland, the Netherlands, and Scotland. Elsewhere, it peaked at number three in Norway, number five in Belgium (Flanders), number six in Italy and Switzerland, number seven in France, and number eight in the Czech Republic.

== Music video ==
The Pussycat Dolls in the music video in a photo session representing a part of their tour life

The video for "Stickwitu" was shot over two days in various Los Angeles locations, including the Orpheum Theatre, and was directed by director Nigel Dick, known for his work with other pop artists. Dick was enlisted to capitalize on success of "Don’t Cha". Dick acknowledged the pressure of following a major hit, explaining that "there’s always pressure on the set” and that "the videos are always important," adding that this clip was crucial because it "establishes the way they want to be seen from now on." Scherzinger noted that the shoot also aimed to make each member more identifiable to fans by giving all six members clear on‑screen presence. It premiered on MTV.com on October 13, 2005.

"Stickwitu" is presented as a loose "day in the life" portrait of the Pussycat Dolls on tour, following them as they wake in motel rooms, travel by bus, get ready for shows, pose for photo shoots, and run soundchecks alongside performance footage. Scherzinger described the clip as showing "much more vulnerability," balancing the strength required to perform with the emotional strain of maintaining relationships while on the road and allowing viewers to "get to know each girl a little bit more" on and off stage. Dick characterized the video as a "wonderful mess," their routine that is "informal but beautiful," mixing high‑fashion performance images with playful moments such as a mini dance‑off where each member dances to her own chosen track.

== Live performances ==
On December 7, 2005, the Pussycat Dolls performed "Stickwitu" at the KIIS-FM Jingle Ball held at the Shrine Auditorium in Los Angeles, California. Later that month, the group performed a medley of "Stickwitu" and its B-side, "Santa Baby" at the 2005 Radio Music Awards. In 2006, the group and Avant performed together on three separate occasions: The View (February 20), The Tyra Banks Show (March 3), and the 2006 Soul Train Music Awards. On June 30, the group performed "Don't Cha", "Buttons", and "Stickwitu" on Good Morning America as part of its Summer Concert Series. The group performed at a Vodafone TBA secret gig at Windsor Racecourse in London on June 26. The concert was recorded and subsequently released on DVD as PCD Live from London on December 1.

"Stickwitu" was included in the set lists for the group's PCD World Tour (2006–2007), supporting-act appearances on Christina Aguilera's Back to Basics Tour (2007), its Doll Domination Tour (2009), and supporting-act appearances on Britney Spears's The Circus Starring Britney Spears (2009), and the PCD Forever Tour (2026), which featured only members Roberts, Scherzinger, and Kimberly Wyatt. Scherzinger also performed the song during her solo concert tours including, Nicole Scherzinger 2012 and An Evening with Nicole Scherzinger (2025).

== Track listings and formats ==
US 12-inch vinyl and digital single

1. "Stickwitu" (album version) – 3:27
2. "Santa Baby" – 3:00
3. "Stickwitu" (R&B Remix) (Note: The R&B Remix of "Stickwitu" is titled "Avant Mix" on digital editions of the single.) (featuring Avant) – 3:17

European CD single

1. "Stickwitu" (album version) – 3:27
2. "Stickwitu" (R&B Remix) (featuring Avant) – 3:17

Australian and European maxi CD single

1. "Stickwitu" (album version) – 3:27
2. "Santa Baby" – 3:00
3. "Stickwitu" (R&B Remix) (featuring Avant) – 3:17
4. "Stickwitu" (music video)

== Credits and personnel ==
Credits adapted from the liner notes of PCD.

Mixing

- Mixed at The Record Plant (Hollywood, California).

Personnel

- The PCD orchestra – strings
- Avant (Note: Remix version) – songwriter, additional vocals, vocal production
- Mike "Angry" Eleopoulos – recording
- Ron Fair – producer, arrangement, conductor, harmonica, organ, piano, rhodes
- Franne Golde – songwriter
- Tal Herzberg – co-producer, engineering, Pro Tools, bass
- Mike Hogue – assistant mix engineer
- Cori Jacobs – rhodes
- Kasia Livingston – songwriter
- Peter Mokran – mixing, remixer, vocal production
- Robert Palmer – songwriter, original drum programming
- Allen Sides – string recording

== Charts ==
=== Weekly charts ===
Weekly peak performance for "Stickwitu"
Chart (2005–2006)	Peak position
Australia (ARIA)	2
Australian Urban (ARIA)	1
Austria (Ö3 Austria Top 40)	11
Belgium (Ultratop 50 Flanders)	5
Belgium (Ultratop 50 Wallonia)	33
Canada CHR/Pop Top 30 (Radio & Records)	3
Canada Hot AC Top 30 (Radio & Records)	22
CIS Airplay (TopHit)	35
Czech Republic Airplay (ČNS IFPI)	8
European Hot 100 Singles (Billboard)	2
France (SNEP)	7
Germany (GfK)	11
Greece (IFPI)	19
Hungary (Rádiós Top 40)	5
Hungary (Dance Top 40)	8
Ireland (IRMA)	2
Italy (FIMI)	6
Netherlands (Dutch Top 40)	2
Netherlands (Single Top 100)	2
New Zealand (Recorded Music NZ)	1
Norway (VG-lista)	3
Romania (Romanian Top 100)	8
Russia Airplay (TopHit)	20
Scottish Singles Sales (Official Charts)	2
Sweden (Sverigetopplistan)	28
Switzerland (Schweizer Hitparade)	6
UK Singles (Official Charts)	1
UK Airplay (Music Week)	2
UK Hip Hop/R&B (Official Charts)	1
US Billboard Hot 100	5
US Adult Contemporary (Billboard)	29
US Adult Pop Airplay (Billboard)	27
US Dance Airplay (Billboard)	25
US Hot R&B/Hip-Hop Songs (Billboard) Avant mix	63
US Pop Airplay (Billboard)	1
US Rhythmic Airplay (Billboard)	9

=== Year-end charts ===
2005 year-end performance for "Stickwitu"
Chart (2005)	Position
UK Singles (OCC)	28

2006 year-end performance for "Stickwitu"
Chart (2006)	Position
Australia (ARIA)	29
Australian Urban (ARIA)	8
Austria (Ö3 Austria Top 40)	61
Belgium (Ultratop 50 Flanders)	62
CIS (TopHit)	83
European Hot 100 Singles (Billboard)	22
France (SNEP)	93
Germany (Media Control GfK)	55
Hungary (Rádiós Top 40)	50
Netherlands (Dutch Top 40)	50
Netherlands (Single Top 100)	56
New Zealand (RIANZ)	16
Romania (Romanian Top 100)	27
Russia Airplay (TopHit)	81
Switzerland (Schweizer Hitparade)	39
UK Singles (OCC)	132
UK Airplay (Music Week)	75
US Billboard Hot 100	40
US Rhythmic Airplay (Billboard)	40

=== Decade-end charts ===
Decade-end chart performance for "Stickwitu"
Chart (2000–2009)	Position
US Mainstream Top 40 (Billboard)	36

== Certifications ==
Certification and sales for "Stickwitu"
Region	Certification	Certified units/sales
Australia (ARIA)	Platinum	70,000^{^}
Brazil (Pro-Música Brasil)	Platinum	60,000^{‡}
New Zealand (RMNZ)	2× Platinum	60,000^{‡}
United Kingdom (BPI)	Platinum	677,000
United States (RIAA)	3× Platinum	3,000,000^{‡}
United States (RIAA) Mastertone	Platinum	1,000,000^{*}
^{*} Sales figures based on certification alone.^{^} Shipments figures based on certification alone.^{‡} Sales+streaming figures based on certification alone.

== Release history ==
Release dates and formats for "Stickwitu"
Region	Date	Format(s)	Label(s)	Ref.
United States	September 26, 2005	Contemporary hit radio	A&M; Interscope	
United Kingdom	October 28, 2005	Contemporary hit radio	Polydor	
Germany	November 25, 2005	CD; maxi CD	Universal Music	
United Kingdom	November 28, 2005	CD	Polydor	
United States	January 9, 2006	Urban contemporary radio	A&M; Interscope	
France	February 20, 2006	CD	Universal Music	

== See also ==
- List of number-one singles from the 2000s (New Zealand)
- List of UK Singles Chart number ones of the 2000s
- List of Billboard Mainstream Top 40 number-one songs of 2006
