= Nicole Scherzinger on screen and on stage =

Artist videography

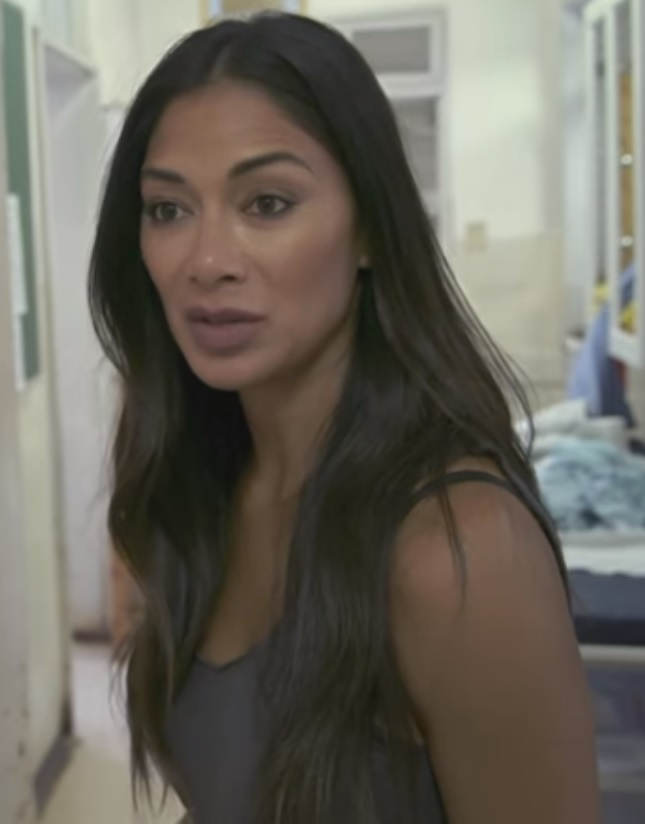
Nicole Scherzinger in 2018

Nicole Scherzinger is an American singer and actress who has recorded widely and appeared in film, television, music videos and on stage in both the West End and Broadway. She first appeared on television as a contestant and eventually became a member of Eden's Crush on Popstars USA; a show aimed at finding new talent to form a group. Following the band's dissolution in 2002, Scherzinger took a detour in acting and guest-starred in television shows such as My Wife and Kids (2002) and had a cameo in the independent comedy, Chasing Papi (2003).

Her performances as the lead singer of the Pussycat Dolls from 2003 to 2009 brought her international attention, which led to her collaborating with other artists and appearing in three music videos in 2006, including a collaboration with P. Diddy's "Come to Me". The following year, she released her first music videos as a solo artist to the songs "Whatever U Like" and "Baby Love" from her shelved solo project, Her Name is Nicole. In 2009, the music video for "Jai Ho (You Are My Destiny)" received a MTV Video Music Award nomination. After the group's hiatus, Scherzinger became a judge on The Sing-Off for its two first seasons and won the tenth season of Dancing with the Stars.

After her stint as a guest judge on the British X Factor was favorably received by viewers and producers, Scherzinger was a main judge on the first season of the American version of the show. Her role was met with several controversies, while her performance was panned by critics. Meanwhile, Scherzinger released her debut album Killer Love (2011) and music videos for the disc's singles "Poison", "Don't Hold Your Breath", "Right There", "Wet" and "Try with Me". The following year, she appeared in Barry Sonnenfeld's Men in Black 3, and found greater success on the British X Factor, where she appeared as a judge for four series (2012–2013 and 2016-2017). She received a nomination for National Television Award for Best TV Judge (2017).

Scherzinger released four music videos from her sophomore solo album, Big Fat Lie (2014), including the lead single "Your Love". In 2015, she appeared on three variety shows; in the United States as a contestant, winning the inaugural season of I Can Do That, co-hosting Best Time Ever with Neil Patrick Harris, and in the UK appeared as a music panelist in Bring the Noise. She voiced the titular mother's role of Sina in Moana in 2016 and in 2017 starred in the television film Dirty Dancing, a remake of the 1987 film of the same name. Scherzinger appeared as a panelist on The Masked Singer from 2019 to 2023, to ratings success. She made her West End debut in Cats, as Grizabella, in 2014, followed in 2023 by Sunset Boulevard, where her starring role as Norma Desmond earned her the Laurence Olivier Award for Best Actress in a Musical. The following year, she reprised the role on Broadway.

== Film ==
List of films and roles
Title	Year	Role(s)	Notes	Ref.
Chasing Papi	2003	Miss Puerto Rico		
Love Don't Cost a Thing	2003	Champagne Girl		
Be Cool	2005	Herself	Cameo	
Men in Black 3	2012	Boris' Girlfriend		
Moana	2016	Sina (voice)		
Ralph Breaks the Internet	2018	Mo's Mother (voice)	Mid-credits scene	
Yoshiki: Under the Sky	2023	Herself	Documentary film	
Moana 2	2024	Sina (voice)		
Girl Group	TBA	TBA	Filming	

== Music videos ==
=== As a performer ===
Title	Year	Other performer(s)	Director(s)	Ref.
"Lie About Us"	2006	Avant	Benny Boom	
"You Are My Miracle"	2006	Vittorio Grigolo	Declan Whitebloom	
"Come to Me"	2006	P. Diddy	Chris Robinson	
"Whatever U Like"	2007	T.I.	Paul Hunter	
"Baby Love"	2007	will.i.am	Francis Lawrence	
"Scream"	2008	Timbaland; Keri Hilson	Justin Francis	
"Jai Ho (You Are My Destiny)"	2009	A.R. Rahman; The Pussycat Dolls	Thomas Kloss	
"Heartbeat"	2010	Enrique Iglesias	Hiro Murai	
"Poison"	2010	—N/a	Joseph Kahn	
"Don't Hold Your Breath"	2011	—N/a	Rich Lee	
"Right There"	2011	50 Cent	Paul Hunter	
"Coconut Tree"	2011	Mohombi	Director X	
"Wet"	2011	—N/a	Justin Francis	
"Try with Me"	2011	—N/a	Aaron Platt; Joseph Toman	
"Boomerang"	2013	—N/a	Nathalie Canguilhem	
"Fino all'estasi" / "Hasta el éxtasis"	2013	Eros Ramazzotti	Robert Hales	
"Missing You"	2013	Alex Gaudino	Paul Boyd	
"Io ti penso amore"	2013	David Garrett	—N/a	
"Your Love"	2014	—N/a	Dawn Shadforth	
"On the Rocks" +(Wideboys video edit)	2014	—N/a	Tim Mattia	
"Run"	2014	—N/a	Christopher Sims	
"Bang"	2014	—N/a	Anders Rostad	
"Mona Lisa Smile"	2016	will.i.am	Michael Jurkovac	
"Papi"	2016	Todrick Hall	Todrick Hall	
"She's BINGO"	2021	MC Blitzy; Luis Fonsi	Roy Raz	

=== Guest appearances ===
Title	Year	Performer(s)	Director(s)	Ref.
"Enemy"	1999	Days of the New	John Schindler	
"Amber"	2002	311	The Malloys	
"Yes We Can"	2008	will.i.am	Jesse Dylan	
"Please Don’t Bomb Nobody This Holiday"	2009	The Dan Band	—N/a	
"We Are the World 25 for Haiti"	2010	Artists for Haiti	Paul Haggis	
"(It) Feels So Good"	2011	Steven Tyler	Ray Kay	
"I Like How It Feels"	2011	Enrique Iglesias; Pitbull; The WAV.s	Enrique Iglesias	
"American Girl (Celebrity Lipsync Version)"	2013	Bonnie McKee	—N/a	
"Imagine" (UNICEF: World version)	2014	Various	Michael Jurkovac	
"In Love By Now"	2015	Jamie Foxx	—N/a	

== Television ==
Title	Year(s)	Role(s)	Notes	Ref.
Popstars USA	2001	Herself / Contestant	Season 1	
Half & Half	2002	Jasmine	Episode: "The Big in with the in Crowd Episode"	
Wanda at Large	2002	Gorgeous Woman	Episode: "The Plane Trip"	
My Wife and Kids	2003	Veronica	2 episodes	
The X Factor (UK)	Various (Note: 2007, 2010, 2012-13, 2016-17)	Herself / Various (Note: Guest mentor, Guest judge, Judge)	Series 4, 7, 9-10, 13-14	
Cane	2007	Herself	Episode: "Family Business"	
Big Time Rush	2009	Herself	Episode: "Big Time Audition"	
The Sing-Off	2009–10	Herself / Judge	Season 1 & 2	
Dancing with the Stars	2010	Herself / Contestant	Season 10	
How I Met Your Mother	2010	Jessica Glitter	Episode: "Glitter"	
The X Factor (US)	2011	Herself / Judge	Season 1	
Mixology	2014	Herself	Episode: "Fab & Jessica & Dominic"	
Project Runway All Stars	2015	Herself / Guest judge	Episode: "Sketching with Sharks"	
I Can Do That	2015	Herself / Contestant	Season 1	
Best Time Ever with Neil Patrick Harris	2015	Herself / Co-Host	Season 1	
Bring the Noise	2015	Herself / Team Captain	Season 1	
RuPaul's Drag Race: All Stars	2016	Herself / Guest Judge	Episode: "Drag Movie Shequels"	
Dirty Dancing	2017	Penny Riviera	Television film	
Drop the Mic	2017	Herself / Contestant	Episode: "[Scherzinger] vs. Lil Rel Howery / Charlie Puth vs. Backstreet Boys"	
Lip Sync Battle	2017–18	Herself / Various	2 episodes	
Australia's Got Talent	2019	Herself / Judge	Season 9	
The X Factor: Celebrity	2019	Herself / Judge	8 episodes	
The X Factor: The Band	2019	Herself / Judge	4 episodes	
The Masked Singer	2019–23	Herself / Panelist	Seasons 1–10	
I Can See Your Voice	2020	Herself / Guest Panelist	Episode: "[Scherzinger], DeRay Davis, Russell Peters, Cheryl Hines, Adrienne Houghton"	
Trese	2021	Miranda Trese (voice)	2 episodes	
Annie Live!	2021	Grace Farrell	Television special	
That's My Jam (UK)	2022	Herself / Contestant	Episode: "[Scherzinger] & Thom Evans vs. Joey Fatone & Aloe Blacc"	
That's My Jam	2023	Herself / Contestant	Episode: "Jason Derulo & [Scherzinger] vs. Kelsea Ballerini & Julia Michaels"	
Building the Band	2025	Herself / Judge		
Elsbeth	2026	Serena Collyer	season 4 episode 1 "Crazy in Love"	

== Web series ==
Title	Year	Role(s)	Notes	Ref.
The Sidemen Show	2018	Herself	Episode: "Sidemen Rescue Nicole Scherzinger"	

== Stage ==
Title	Year	Role(s)	Venue	Ref.
Rent	2010	Maureen Johnson	Hollywood Bowl	
The Rocky Horror Show	2010	The Usherette (Act 1); Janet Weiss (Act 2)	Wiltern Theatre	
Cats	2014–15	Grizabella	London Palladium	
Sunset Boulevard	2023–24	Norma Desmond	Savoy Theatre	
Sunset Boulevard	2024–25	Norma Desmond	St. James Theatre	
