= Nicole Scherzinger discography =

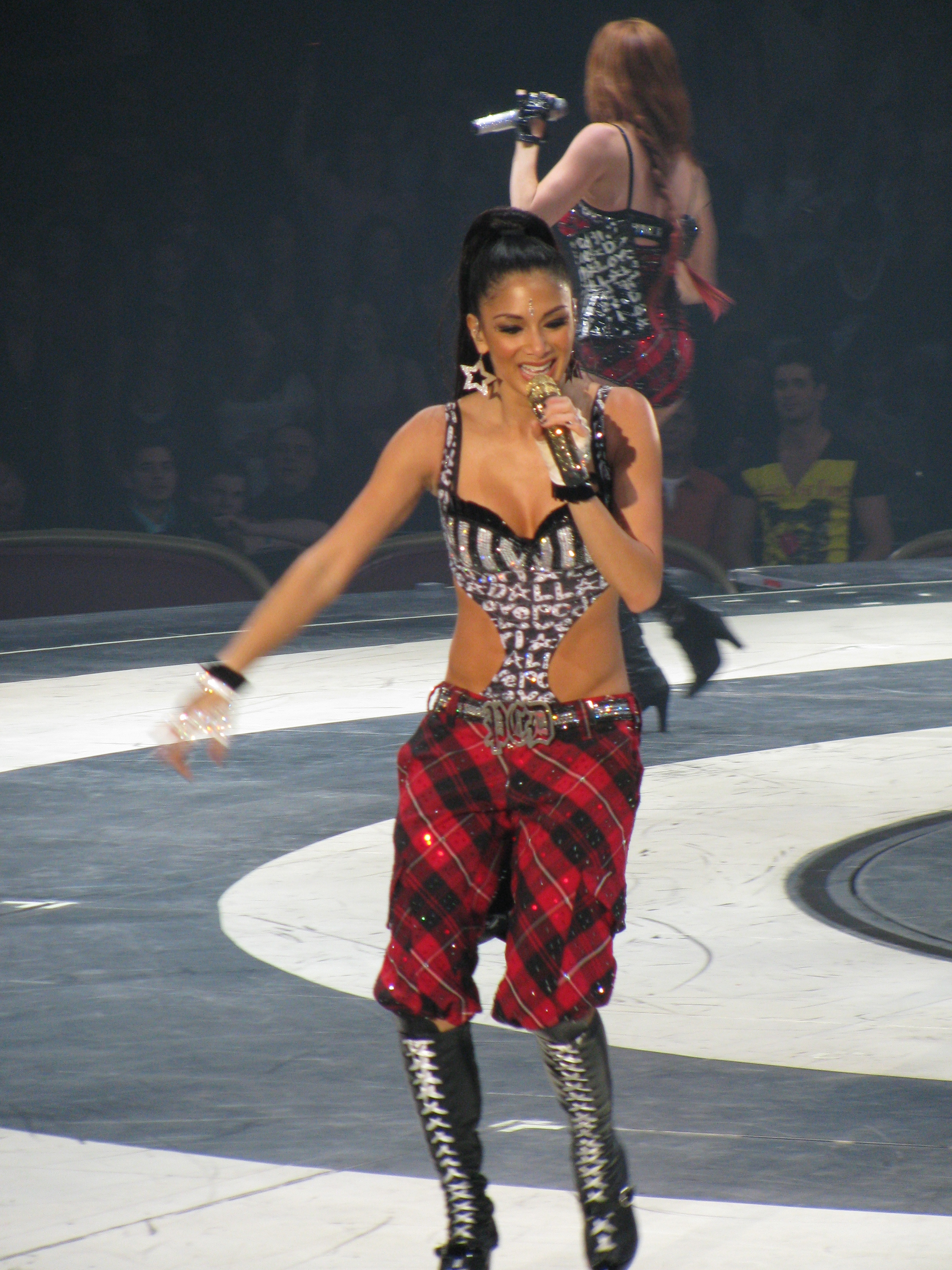
- Studio albums: 2
- Singles: 26
- Promotional singles: 1
- Charity singles: 3

American singer Nicole Scherzinger has released 2 studio albums, 29 singles (including 11 as a featured artist and 3 charity singles), and 1 promotional single. She came into prominence in the early 2000s as a member of the ill-fated girl-group Eden's Crush and then was cast as the lead singer of the Pussycat Dolls, a burlesque troupe turned-recording group. She has sold over 60 million records as a solo artist and as a member of the Pussycat Dolls.

During the hiatus of the Pussycat Dolls, Scherzinger planned to release her debut album, Her Name is Nicole in 2007. After two years of projected release dates and four singles—"Whatever U Like", Baby Love", "Supervillain", and "Puakenikeni"—failed to make any significant impact on the Billboard charts, led Scherzinger to cancel the project and shifted back her focus to the Pussycat Dolls. In 2009, Scherzinger collaborated with A. R. Rahman on a pop version of "Jai Ho" titled "Jai Ho! (You Are My Destiny)"; the song was a worldwide success, reaching number one in 17 countries including in Australia.

Following the group's disbandment, Scherzinger released her debut studio album, Killer Love (2011). A moderate success, the album debuted at number 8 on the UK Albums Chart and produced the singles "Poison", "Don't Hold Your Breath", "Right There", "Wet" and "Try with Me" which was included on the reissue. The second single "Don't Hold Your Breath" topped the UK Singles Chart, while third single "Right There" became the singer's highest charting single on the Billboard Hot 100 as a solo artist. Scherzinger's second studio album, Big Fat Lie was released through RCA Records in October 2014. The album was preceded by the singles "Your Love", "Run" and "On the Rocks".

== Albums ==
=== Studio albums ===
List of studio albums, with selected details, chart positions, sales, and certifications
Title	Album	Peak chart positions										Sales	Certifications
Title	Album	AUS	BEL (FL)	BEL (WA)	FRA	GER	IRE	NLD	NZ	SWI	UK	Sales	Certifications
Killer Love	Released: March 18, 2011; Label: Interscope; Format: CD, digital download	26	52	61	57	85	14	66	34	55	8	UK: 140,000 (Note: United Kingdom sales figures for Kiler Love as of November 2011.)	RMNZ: Gold; BPI: Gold
Big Fat Lie	Released: October 17, 2014; Label: RCA; Format: CD, digital download	—	—	156	108	—	39	—	—	95	17		
"—" denotes a recording that did not chart or was not released in that territory.

=== Cast recordings ===
List of cast recordings
Title	Album details
Sunset Blvd: The Album (with Andrew Lloyd Webber and the cast of Sunset Boulevard)	Released: October 25, 2024; Label: The Other Songs; Formats: CD, digital download, LP, streaming, Vinyl

== Singles ==
=== As a lead artist ===
List of singles as lead artist, with selected chart positions and certifications, showing year released and album name
Title	Year	Peak chart positions										Certifications	Album
Title	Year	US	AUS	AUT	CAN	FRA	IRE	NLD	NZ	SWI	UK	Certifications	Album
"Whatever U Like" (featuring T.I.)	2007	— (Note: "Whatever U Like" did not enter the Billboard Hot 100, but peaked at number four on the Bubbling Under Hot 100 Singles.)	—	—	57	—	—	—	—	—	—		Non-album singles
"Baby Love" (featuring will.i.am)	2007	— (Note: "Baby Love" did not enter the Billboard Hot 100, but peaked at number eight on the Bubbling Under Hot 100 Singles chart.)	58	21	—	—	15	56	—	14	14		Non-album singles
"Supervillain"	2007	—	—	—	—	—	—	—	—	—	—		Non-album singles
"Puakenikeni"	2007	—	—	—	—	—	—	—	—	—	—		Non-album singles
"Poison"	2010	—	—	—	—	—	7	—	—	—	3	BPI: Silver	Killer Love
"Don't Hold Your Breath"	2011	86	17	65	70	45	4	44	21	62	1	ARIA: 2× Platinum; BPI: Platinum	Killer Love
"Right There" (featuring 50 Cent)	2011	39	8	—	44	—	7	—	7	—	3	RIAA: Gold; ARIA: 2× Platinum; BPI: Gold; RMNZ: Platinum	Killer Love
"Wet"	2011	—	34	—	—	—	10	—	—	—	21	BPI: Silver	Killer Love
"Try with Me"	2011	—	—	—	—	—	29	—	—	—	18		Killer Love
"Boomerang"	2013	—	—	—	—	—	9	—	—	—	6		Non-album single
"Your Love"	2014	—	51	—	—	22	30	—	—	67	6	BPI: Silver	Big Fat Lie
"Run"	2014	—	—	—	—	—	63	—	—	—	46		Big Fat Lie
"On the Rocks"	2014	—	—	—	—	—	—	—	—	—	90		Big Fat Lie
"Bang"	2014	—	—	—	—	—	—	—	—	—	—		Big Fat Lie
"The Drop" (with Dimitri Vegas and David Guetta; featuring Azteck)	2021	—	—	—	—	—	—	—	—	—	—		Non-album single
"—" denotes a release that did not chart or were not released in that territory.

=== Featured singles ===
List of singles as featured artist, with selected chart positions and certifications, showing year released and album name
Title	Year	Peak chart positions										Certifications	Album
Title	Year	US	AUS	CAN	GER	FRA	ITA	NZ	SWE	SWI	UK	Certifications	Album
"Lie About Us" (Avant featuring Nicole Scherzinger)	2006	—	—	—	—	—	—	—	—	—	76		Director
"You Are My Miracle" (Vittorio Grigolo featuring Nicole Scherzinger)	2006	—	—	—	—	—	—	—	—	—	—		Vittorio
"Come to Me" (Diddy featuring Nicole Scherzinger)	2006	9	11	—	6	15	17	25	44	3	4	BPI: Silver; BVMI: Gold	Press Play
"Scream" (Timbaland featuring Keri Hilson and Nicole Scherzinger)	2007	— (Note: "Scream" did not enter the Billboard Hot 100, but peaked at number twenty-two on the Bubbling Under Hot 100 Singles chart.)	20	41	9	16	—	9	8	45	12	BPI: Silver	Shock Value
"Jai Ho! (You Are My Destiny)" (A.R. Rahman and The Pussycat Dolls featuring Nicole Scherzinger)	2009	15	1	4	29	3	2	2	40	18	3	ARIA: 4× Platinum; RMNZ: Platinum; BPI: Platinum	Doll Domination
"Hotel Room Service" (Pitbull remix featuring Nicole Scherzinger)	2009	—	58	72	—	33	11	7	52	—	8		Rebelution
"Heartbeat" (Enrique Iglesias featuring Nicole Scherzinger)	2010	—	5	72	—	33	11	7	52	—	8	ARIA: 2× Platinum; FIMI: Gold; RMNZ: Platinum; BPI: Silver	Euphoria
"Coconut Tree" (Mohombi featuring Nicole Scherzinger)	2011	—	—	80	—	75	—	—	8	—	—	GLF: Platinum	MoveMeant
"Out This Club" (Rudie Classic featuring R. Kelly, Polow Da Don and Nicole Scherzinger)	2011	—	—	—	—	—	—	—	—	—	—		Non-album single
"Fino all'estasi" / "Hasta el éxtasis" (Eros Ramazzotti featuring Nicole Scherzinger)	2013	—	—	—	—	—	20	—	—	—	—	FIMI: Gold	Noi / Somos
"Missing You" (Alex Gaudino featuring Nicole Scherzinger)	2013	—	—	—	—	—	—	—	—	—	—		Non-album singles
"—" denotes a release that did not chart or were not released in that territory.

=== Charity singles ===
List of charity singles, with selected chart positions and showing year released
Title	Year	Peak chart positions									
Title	Year	US	AUS	CAN	GER	FRA	ITA	NZ	SWE	SWI	UK
"We Are the World 25 for Haiti" (Artists for Haiti)	2010	2	18	7	—	—	10	5	5	—	50
"Love Song to the Earth" (Various Artists)	2015	—	—	—	—	64	—	—	—	—	—
"#WheresTheLove" (The Black Eyed Peas featuring The World)	2016	—	15	—	39	26	—	— (Note: "#WheresTheLove" did not enter the NZ Top 40 Singles Chart, but peaked at number 3 on the NZ Heatseekers chart.)	—	41	47
"—" denotes a release that did not chart or were not released in that territory.

=== Promotional singles ===
- 2021 - "She's Bingo" (MC Blitzy featuring Luis Fonsi & Nicole Scherzinger)

== Other charted songs ==
List of songs, with selected chart positions, showing year released and album name
Title	Year	Peak chart positions			Certifications	Album
Title	Year	CAN	NZ	UK	Certifications	Album
"Numba 1 (Tide Is High)" (Kardinal Offishall featuring Nicole Scherzinger)	2008	47	—	—		Not 4 Sale
"Killer Love"	2011	—	—	184		Killer Love
"Where You Are" (with Christopher Jackson, Rachel House, Auliʻi Cravalho & Louise Bush)	2016	—	— (Note: "Where You Are" did not enter the NZ Top 40 Singles Chart, but peaked at number six on the NZ Heatseekers Singles Chart.)	—	RIAA: 2× Platinum; RMNZ: Platinum; BPI: Platinum	Moana
"—" denotes a song that did not chart or were not released in that territory.

== Songwriting discography ==
List of Scherzinger's credits on albums by other artists.
Title	Year	Performer(s)	Credits	Originating album
"Noche Cool"	2006	Belinda	Writer	Utopía
"The Beautiful People (from Burlesque)"	2010	Christina Aguilera	Writer	Burlesque: Original Motion Picture Soundtrack

== See also ==
- List of songs recorded by Nicole Scherzinger
- Nicole Scherzinger videography
