= JaQuel Knight =

American choreographer and dancer (born 1989)

- Born: August 6, 1989 (age 35); North Carolina, United States of America
- Occupation(s): Choreographer, dancer
- Years active: 2005 - present
- Website: http://www.jaquelknight.com

JaQuel Knight (born August 6, 1989) is an American choreographer and dancer. Born in North Carolina and raised in Atlanta, he has worked with Beyoncé on many of her most notable dances, including on "Single Ladies", "Formation" and the historic Coachella performances which she headlined.

== Early life ==
JaQuel Knight was born on August 6, 1989, in North Carolina and raised in Atlanta. At an early age, he would imitate choreography from MTV music videos. He took his first dance class at the age of fourteen, which he says had a huge impact on him and persuaded him to choose dance as a career. Knight played saxophone for 7 years and while marching in his high school band he choreographed the band's movements. After he quit band he started a dance group called TruStuylz.

== Career ==
His group, TruStuylz performed for local talent shows and celebrity basketball games. Knight then landed a spot for dancing to "Walk It Out" on the BET Hip Hop Awards stage. He began teaching at Dance 411 which led him visiting Los Angeles for ten days. He described the experience as his destiny.

Knight auditioned from learning lessons from Chuck Maldadnado. His first major choreography job was for a promo tour for Michelle Williams. He substandard moments as he auditioned for several auditions but didn't make the cut for all of them. The experience made him more prepared and independent.

Knight choreographed music videos from various artists, including Beyoncé, Chris Brown, Britney Spears, Kelly Rowland, Nicole Scherzinger, Tinashe and Brandy. He has been mainly working with Beyoncé since he was eighteen years old and has choreographed several of her music videos including "Single Ladies", "Formation", "Diva" and "Drunk in Love". He also worked with Beyoncé in notable events including her two consecutive world tours and Coachella performances, which have been described as historic. Knight also choreographed various events including The X Factor, The Voice, Dancing with the Stars, Good Morning America and Britain's Got Talent. In 2013, Knight started his production company based in Los Angeles. The company oversees a group of artists, songwriters and producers and producing short films.

== Work ==
List of music videos JaQuel Knight has choreographed/co-choreographed:

- "2 On" – Tinashe
- "All Hands on Deck" – Tinashe
- "Apeshit" – The Carters
- "Bang" – Nicole Scherzinger
- "Body" – Megan Thee Stallion
- "Body Language" – Kid Ink featuring Usher & Tinashe
- "Booty" – Jennifer Lopez featuring Iggy Azalea
- "Coconut Tree" – Mohombi featuring Nicole Scherzinger
- "Die Young" – Kesha
- "Diva" – Beyonce
- "Down for Whatever" – Kelly Rowland
- "Drop That Kitty" – Ty Dolla Sign featuring Charli XCX & Tinashe
- "Drunk In Love" – Beyonce
- "Emergency" – Icona Pop
- "Emotional" – Snoh Aalegra
- "Feeling Myself" – Nicki Minaj featuring Beyoncé
- "Flame" – Tinashe
- "Formation" – Beyonce
- "Grown Woman" – Beyonce
- "Hold Up" – Beyonce
- "Ice" – Kelly Rowland
- "Invincible" – Kelly Clarkson
- "Kisses Down Low" – Kelly Rowland
- "Lean on Me" – B.O.B featuring Victoria Monét
- "Lemon" – N.E.R.D featuring Rihanna
- "Life After Love/Freak" – Victoria Monét
- "Love U Betta" – Neon Hitch
- "Lose My Breath" - Destiny's Child
- "Me & My Girls" – Fifth Harmony
- "Miss Movin' On" – Fifth Harmony
- "New Love" – Victoria Monét
- "New Thing" – Rye Rye
- "Player" – Tinashe featuring Chris Brown
- "Put It Down" – Brandy feat Chris Brown
- "Rain" – Ben Platt
- "Right There" – Nicole Scherzinger
- "Single Ladies" – Beyoncé
- "So Good" – Zara Larsson" featuring Ty Dolla Sign
- "Sorry" – Beyoncé
- "Strip That Down" – Liam Payne featuring Quavo
- "Superlove" – Tinashe
- "Sweat" – Bobby Newberry
- "Think About Us" – Little Mix featuring Ty Dollar Sign
- "Thot Shit" – Megan Thee Stallion
- "Vulnerable" – Tinashe featuring Travis Scott
- "WAP" – Cardi B featuring Megan Thee Stallion
- "Walk It Out" – Jennifer Hudson featuring Timbaland
- "We Break The Dawn" – Michelle Williams
- "Wildest Dreams" – Brandy
- "Woman Like Me" – Little Mix featuring Nicki Minaj
- "Wet" – Nicole Scherzinger
- "You Don't Own Me" – Grace feat. G-Eazy
- "Your Love" – Nicole Scherzinger
