= Puakenikeni =

Puakenikeni is the name of

- Fagraea berteroana, a tree
- a song by Nicole Scherzinger
