= Boomerang (Nicole Scherzinger song) =

2013 single by Nicole Scherzinger

Single by Nicole Scherzinger
- Released: March 8, 2013
- Recorded: 2012
- Studio: The Bunker (Paris, France); Record Plant (Los Angeles, California)
- Genre: Dance; pop
- Length: 3:18
- Label: Interscope
- Songwriters: Azengo; Morgan Jackson; Danny Mercer; Anthony Preston; Sandy Wilhelm
- Producers: Sandy Vee; Anthony Preston; will.i.am

Nicole Scherzinger singles chronology
"Try with Me" (2011)	"Boomerang" (2013)	"Fino all'estasi" (2013)

Music video
- "Boomerang" on YouTube

"Boomerang" is a song by American singer Nicole Scherzinger, originally intended for her then-upcoming second studio album. It was written by Azengo, Morgan Jackson, Danny Mercer, Anthony Preston, and Sandy Wilhelm, with production by Wilhelm under his production name of Sandy Vee, Preston, and will.i.am. The song was released as a single on March 8, 2013 by Interscope. It is a dance and pop song with uplifting lyrics that speak about coming back up when you get knocked down, with music critics drawing comparisons to "Stronger (What Doesn't Kill You)" by Kelly Clarkson. Critical reception of the former from critics was mixed, with criticism for the simple lyrics but praise for the chorus being catchy.

Despite selling over 30,000 copies in its first few days or release, and topping the UK midweek chart, "Boomerang" had been overlooked by UK radio stations BBC Radio 1 and Capital FM due to it not being deemed relevant for their respective audiences. In the end, the song was playlisted by Capital FM and made its single chart debut in Scotland at number two, while reaching number six in the United Kingdom and number nine in Ireland. An accompanying music video featuring a kaleidoscope camera effect, geometric and black and white checkerboard backgrounds drew further comparisons to the works of Janet Jackson, La Roux, Madonna, and the song "Scream & Shout" by willi.am and Britney Spears. The visual received positive reviews from critics, with them praising the choreography and showcase of Scherzinger's body.

By 2014, Scherzinger had left her long-term record label Interscope and signed a new multi-album deal with RCA Records. "Boomerang" was Scherzinger's last release under Interscope, and upon announcing her second studio album, Big Fat Lie (2014), she confirmed that the song was now a standalone single. Scherzinger stated that the song belongs to a body of work which had been scrapped, and was one of five scrapped projects recorded between her first and second albums.

== Background and release ==
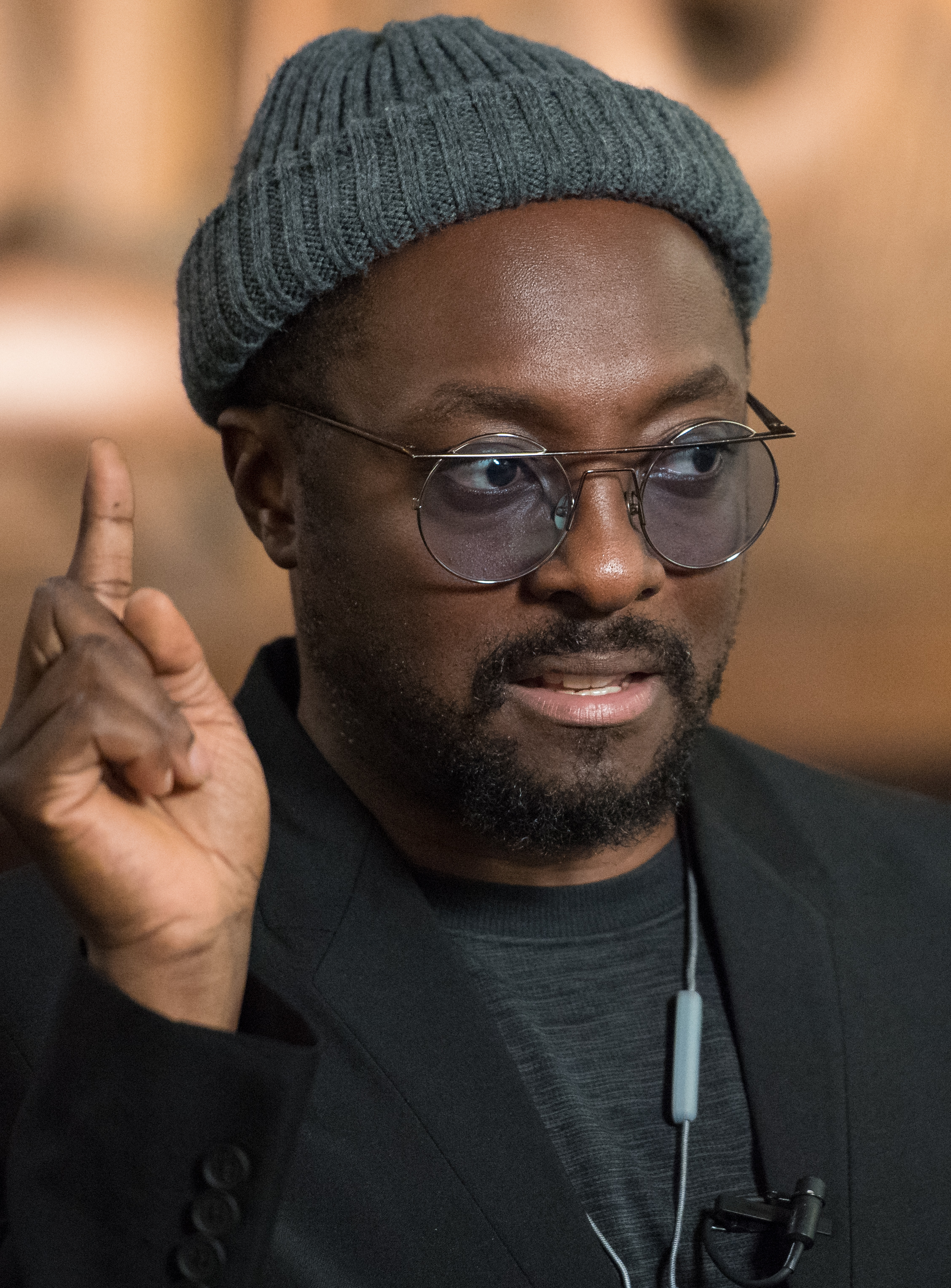
will.i.am had previously collaborated twice with Scherzinger for the Pussycat Dolls single "Beep" (2006) and her solo single "Baby Love" (2007).

Following the international release of her debut studio album Killer Love (2011), Scherzinger began working on a US version of the album. The US edition was to include an alternate track listing, made up of "a mixture of strong dance anthems, urban twists and uplifting songs". At the time of recording in August 2011, Scherzinger had over 40 songs to choose from for the new release, but said that it would "not be finished until the very last minute. I don't know if I will ever feel like I have finished the album." In late 2011, Scherzinger was a judge on the inaugural season of music competition show The X Factor USA and performed the song "Pretty", recorded for the US version of Killer Love. In July 2012, Digital Spy reported that Scherzinger was recording with will.i.am for the album, signaling the end of the Killer Love era and plans for the US reissue of the album. Scherzinger and will.am have previously worked together on the Pussycat Dolls single "Beep" (2006), as well as Scherzinger's solo single "Baby Love". Later that year, Scherzinger would go on to judge (and win) the ninth series of the British edition of The X Factor.

In November 2012, Scherzinger revealed her new single was titled "Boomerang", and that it was expected to appear on her then-upcoming second studio album. Several days later, a brief clip of Scherzinger on set of the video was shown during a video interlude as part of Scherzinger's judging duties on the ninth UK series of The X Factor. "Boomerang" was released as a standalone download and also as part of a remixes EP with remixes by Mathieu Bouthier, Ruzz Loaderz, and Cahill on March 8, 2013 in Ireland, while released in the former format on March 10 in the United Kingdom, and March 17 in New Zealand. In 2013, when asked about whether she would return to judge the tenth series, Scherzinger had doubts, noting that the live shows of the competition would clash with plans to release a new album worldwide in November that same year.

However by February 2014, Scherzinger had left her long time record label Interscope for a new multi-record deal with RCA Records and Sony Music. Ahead of releasing her second album, Scherzinger confirmed that "Boomerang" would not be included, confirming its status a standalone single. She said "I did an entire album that belongs with 'Boomerang'. It had its own family. Unfortunately I don't know if those songs will ever be heard". She also revealed that she had recorded five albums between the release of her debut and second album, were all scrapped, though considered releasing the songs for her fans eventually. Scherzinger also addressed the situation in 2014 when promoting "Your Love", the first single from her second album Big Fat Lie (2014). During an interview with The Official Big Top 40 she was asked "Over a year ago you released 'Boomerang' and then disappeared. What happened?", to which Scherzinger replied that that previous label, Interscope, did not put the album out "and Sony are believers, so I'm excited for new music to come out finally."

== Music and lyrics ==
Musically, "Boomerang" is a dance and pop song, written by Azengo, Morgan Jackson, Danny Mercer, Anthony Preston, and Sandy Wilhelm, with production by Wilhem under his production moniker of "Sandy Vee", Preston, and will.i.am. Idolator's Sam Lanksey described the song as "fizzy" with a layered production. The music was recorded in Paris, France at The Bunker Studios, with further production and vocals recorded at Record Plant studios in Los Angeles, California. The "synth-spangled" song contains a "fuzzy, club-friendly" beat. A review from The Irish Times compared the song to "Stronger (What Doesn't Kill You)", a 2012 single by Kelly Clarkson, calling "Boomerang" a less subtle version.

Lyrically, "Boomerang" is about "not letting the haters keep you down", opined Lanksey. The song centers around getting back up when you get knocked down and not giving up. Scherzinger sings about her ability to turn things around for the better. With "wide-eyed determination", she sings: "You can turn me down, you can throw me now/ The harder out, the harder I come back around". Scherzinger said she related to and resonated with the song due to its uplifting nature, saying "I love this track as I can really relate to the lyrics because I don't always feel on top of the world and fierce and fearless. I have my doubts and days where I wonder if I should just throw in the towel", also noting that the "song givers her strength". One of the key aspects of the chorus is layered vocals from Scherzinger, with the word "Oh!" repeated multiple times.

== Critical reception ==
The song was met with mixed reviews from music critics. Robert Copsey from Digital Spy praised the song, awarding it four out of five stars. In his review, Copsey said: "The metaphor's not without its confusing moments, but that's exactly what makes her so endearing." He went on to praise the song's overall production, "she sings with wide-eyed determination over a fuzzy, club-friendly beat courtesy of will.i.am – who for once supplies a relatively pop-by-numbers melody that grows on the ears". A reviewer writing for The Irish Times said that "Boomerang" was exactly the type of song needed to "January out and usher February in", calling the song "jolly good fun". Sam Lanskey, for Idolator, gave a mixed review, stating: "Scherzinger is back with a new single, but despite the unholy union of Scherzinger and will.i.am, who produced the song, it's actually pretty good!" Lanskey later went on to praise the production, which "is taut and synth-spangled, and that chorus is an earworm". "John Dingwell, writing a review for the Daily Record, said, "Boomerang is a brassy banger that will appeal to younger music fans but scratch the surface and there's only limited shelf life to it." Similarly, Gigwise's Grace Caroll wrote an article called "Big Stars, Bad Songs", in which she criticized the lyrics in "Boomerang", calling the song "a generic dance-fuelled fizzle that sounds slightly like every other pop song you've ever heard".

== Commercial performance ==
Shortly after its release, newspapers the Daily Record and the Daily Mirror both reported that "Boomerang" was not playlisted by radio stations BBC Radio 1 and Capital FM, amongst others. Radio 1 confirmed that it had not playlisted the song "due to the amount of other releases this week" and added that there were "more important releases at the station at the moment". Similarly, despite Scherzinger appearing on Capital FM to promote the release, it "wasn't deemed 'relevant' by radio bosses". Despite this, "Boomerang" shifted 32,520 copies and had peaked at number one in the midweek; this led to the song being playlisted by Capital FM. Scherzinger acknowledged the feat on Twitter, when she tweeted "Woohoo! We finally made a #Boomerang believer out of them."

On March 14, 2013, "Boomerang" debuted on the Irish Singles Chart at number nine, becoming Scherzinger's seventh top-10 single in Ireland. On March 16, 2013, it debuted at number six in the UK. The Official Charts Company noted that although the song opened strong at the start of the week, sales had slowed by the end, resulting in it falling from number one in the midweek listings. Two weeks later, the song jumped 49 places on the UK's Official Streaming Chart, becoming that week's highest climber. It also peaked at number two on the Scottish Singles Chart.

== Music video ==
=== Background ===
The music video for "Boomerang" was filmed in London, UK during the last week of November 2012, with director Nathalie Canguilhelm. Production company HSI London also worked on the video, with Mathieu Pleinfosse serving as Director of Photography, David Poucet as Editor, and JaQuel Knight handling choreography. At the time, Scherzinger was also serving as a judge on the ninth UK series of The X Factor, and brought contestants James Arthur and Jahméne on set. This was shown as part of a VT of behind the scenes footage during the episode of The X Factor airing in the first week of December 2012. On December 19, 2012, a brief five second preview of the video was released online; in the preview, a kaleidoscope camera effect is used. The music video for the song was released on January 25, 2013.

=== Synopsis ===
Scherzinger in the music video with the kaleidoscope camera effect

The concept for "Boomerang" features Scherzinger in a number of different outfits and settings, with added camera effects. It begins with TV screens set out in a plus shape, each screen shows a different part of Scherzinger dressed in a black leather and lace dress, with a multi-colored woven leather jacket The kaleidoscope effect is used giving Scherzinger a rainbow colored shadow, this is interspaced with scenes of Scherzinger in a room full of surveillance cameras and a geometric black and white room. As the song transitions into the chorus, she then appears in front of white backdrop "as multiple copies of herself are seen dancing across the screen". Other scenes include Scherzinger in a latex dress, with cornrows and also dancing in hotpants and stilettos. MTV News' Michael Depland compared the "spectacular face" delivered by Scherzinger to those made by contemporary R&B singer Brandy Norwood in the music video for "What About Us?" (2002).

=== Reception ===
Capital FM praised the video; a reviewer writing for the network said the "energetic" video showcases Scherzinger's "best dance moves". Meanwhile, in an article for the HuffPost, the video was praised by the staff for showing off her "impeccable body". A reviewer for Rap-Up praised Scherzinger's style in the "sizzling" video, saying: "The Pussycat Doll and X Factor alum brings some sex and style as she struts around in the artsy visuals." The video won the Music Award at the Social TV Awards for scoring 6,147,811 views, two weeks after premiering on Vevo.

== Promotion ==
In the week leading up to the song's release, Scherzinger performed "Boomerang" live for the first time on BBC One's charity TV programme Let's Dance For Comic Relief on March 2, 2013, and again at the Give It Up For Comic Relief charity concert in London's Wembley Arena on March 6, 2013. The day after its release, Scherzinger performed the song live on The Jonathan Ross Show and on stage at G-A-Y nightclub in London, UK both on March 9, 2013. A few days later, Scherzinger joined Lorraine Kelly on Daybreak for an interview about her career and a performance of "Boomerang". Further to this, in the lead up to the release of the music video, promotional images for the single were released. Scherzinger wears a see-through black mesh dress with a light blue and pink patterned jacket, alongside an elaborate chain necklace that covers her chest and metallic silver high-heeled shoes.

== Track listing ==
Digital download

1. "Boomerang" – 3:18

Digital download – Remixes EP

1. "Boomerang" – 3:18
2. "Boomerang" (Mathieu Bouthier Remix) – 5:51
3. "Boomerang" (Ruff Loaderz Club Mix) – 6:25
4. "Boomerang" (Cahill Club Remix) – 6:35

== Credits and personnel ==
Credits adapted from media notes, music video credits taken from PromoNews.

Recording

- Vocals recorded at Record Plant, in Los Angeles, California.
- Music recorded at The Bunker, in Paris, France.

Personnel

- Nicole Scherzinger – vocals
- Dylan "3D" Dresdow – audio mixing
- Brian Gardner – mastering
- Julian Prindle – recording (engineering)
- Anthony Preston – co-production, vocal production, songwriter
- Benjamin Rice – engineering assistant, mixing assistant
- Bradford H. Smith – mixing assistant
- Sandy Vee – co-production, mixing, engineering, recording (engineering)
- will.i.am – production, executive production

Music video

- Kathy Angstadt – commissioner
- Ben Ansell – production designer
- Nathalie Canguilhem – director
- JaQuel Knight – choreographer
- HSI London – production company
- Beth Montague – executive producer
- Nightshift – post producer
- Mathieu Pleinfosse – director of photography
- David Poucet – editor

== Charts ==
=== Weekly charts ===
Chart performance for "Boomerang"
Chart (2013)	Peak position
Czech Republic Airplay (ČNS IFPI)	9
Hungary (Rádiós Top 40)	4
Ireland (IRMA)	9
Romania (Airplay 100)	87
Scottish Singles Sales (Official Charts)	2
Slovakia Airplay (ČNS IFPI)	19
UK Singles (Official Charts)	6

=== Year-end charts ===
Year-end chart performance for "Boomerang"
Chart (2013)	Position
Ukraine Airplay (TopHit)	167
UK Singles (OCC)	167

== Release history ==
Release history for "Boomerang"
Country	Date	Format	Label	Ref.
Ireland	March 8, 2013	Digital download	Universal	
United Kingdom	March 10, 2013	Digital download	Polydor	
New Zealand	May 17, 2013	Digital download	Universal	
