= Bang (Nicole Scherzinger song) =

Song recorded by Nicole Scherzinger

Single by Nicole Scherzinger

from the album Big Fat Lie
- Released: December 14, 2014
- Studio: Setai Recording (Florida); Contra Recordings (California); Mastering Palace (New York City)
- Genre: R&B; pop
- Length: 4:27
- Label: RCA
- Songwriters: Terius "The-Dream" Nash; Christopher "Tricky" Stewart
- Producers: Godz of Analog; Tricky Stewart; The-Dream

Nicole Scherzinger singles chronology
"On the Rocks" (2014)	"Bang" (2014)	"She's Bingo" (2021)

Music video
- "Bang" on YouTube

"Bang" is a song recorded by American singer Nicole Scherzinger for her second studio album, Big Fat Lie (2014). The song was written by Terius "The-Dream" Nash and Christopher "Tricky" Stewart, with production from Stewart, The-Dream, and Godz of Analog. The R&B and pop song was vocally produced by Bart Schoudal. It was released as the fourth single from the album on December 14, 2014, for digital download and streaming.

The song received a mixed reception from music critics; some praised Scherzinger's sultry and raspy vocals, as well as the string-driven airy production, while others criticized it for being boring and bland. An accompanying music video, directed by Anders Rostad, sees Scherzinger dancing to "Bang" against a number of colored backdrops and body popping with a male dancer. The video was praised for the sensual tone and simplicity, although it was criticized for being boring.

== Background and production ==
In 2013, online rumors suggested that Scherzinger had been dropped by Interscope Records. A representative for Scherzinger refuted those claims, instead confirming that she was working on new music with Terius "The-Dream" Nash and Tricky Stewart. News of a new record deal was confirmed in February 2014, when it was announced that she had signed a multi-album deal with Sony Music Entertainment's label RCA Records, and that her new album Big Fat Lie (2014) was executively produced by The-Dream and Tricky Stewart.

"Bang" was written by C. "Tricky Stewart" and The-Dream Nash, who also produced the song and provided all of the sequencing. As with all of the songs on Big Fat Lie, Godz of Analog were also involved in the production. Vocal production was handled by Bart Schoudal, who also engineered the recording at Setai Recording Studios in Florida, with assistance from Nick Valentin. It was mixed by Andrew Wuepper and his assistance Josh Drucker, at Contra Recordings in California. Final mastering was completed by Dave Kutch at the Mastering Palace in New York City. Musically, "Bang" is an R&B and pop song, set to a "airy, stringy track". Scherzinger's vocals were described as hoarse and raspy by the Daily Mirror.

== Release and reception ==
Following the release of singles "Your Love", "Run", and "On the Rocks", in December 2014, it was confirmed that "Bang" would serve as the album's fourth single. "Bang" was released around the same time that Scherzinger was appearing in the Andrew Lloyd Webber musical Cats. It was released for digital download and streaming on December 14, 2014.

Idolator's Bradley Stern called "Bang" a "sizzling slow-burner". Fay Strang, writing for the Daily Mirror, praised Scherzinger's "raspy vocals" as sultry. In a post for Musicserver.net, Jaromír Koc gave "Bang" a negative review, saying that "instead of thinking about how to sell meaningfully [Scherzinger] is releasing a terrible boredom [sic]", going on criticize the "sleazy" song as being boring to ears. Similarly, when reviewing Big Fat Lie, Digital Spy's Lewis Corner called the song inoffensive, saying "[it is] bland R&B click-along". The Dutch Top 40 reported that at the time of the single's release, it had been four years since Scherzinger had an entry on the chart.

== Music video ==
An accompanying music video was released on December 15, 2014. It was directed by Anders Rostad, and features a silhouetted Scherzinger performing the song against colored backdrops, interspersed with schemes of choreography that involve her and a male dance partner. The video drew comparisons to American singer Ciara, particularly when Scherzinger appeared "alongside" a male dancer, booty-popping and grinding down to the floor". A few flashing lights and "minimal special effects" are also present in the video. The mood of the video was described as "sensual".

Steven Gottlieb from VideoStatic also noted that the video abandoned "glam and artifice" for "hypnotic" choreography. Similarly Strang also called the video sultry, saying that Scherzinger "looks seriously hot", comments reflected by Lucy Bacon in her article for MTV News, where she said: "The video sees Scherzy get up close and personal with a dancer, as she brings the sex factor and shows off her killer body." However, not all reviews were positive Koc, writing for Czech website Musicserver.cz, went as far as to say that Scherzinger is "really bored" in the video, awarding it three out of ten and criticizing the visual as being "boring to the eyes". In Koc's opinion, the music video seemed like "a cameraman who filmed everything he could think of, and then somehow cut it", noting that it might reflect that RCA/Sony had given up on Scherzinger as an artist.

== Credits and personnel ==
Credits adapted from the liner notes of Big Fat Lie, music video credits adapted from VideoStatic.

=== Recording ===
- Recorded at Setai Recording, Florida
- Mixed at Contra Recordings, California
- Mastered at Mastering Palace, New York City

=== Personnel ===
- Josh Drucker – assistant engineer
- Godz of Analog – producer
- Dave Kutch – mastering engineer
- Terius "The-Dream" Nash – producer, programmer
- Bart Schoudal – vocal producer, engineer
- Christopher "Tricky" Stewart – producer, programmer
- Nick Valentine – assistant engineer
- Andrew Wuepper – mixing engineer

=== Music video ===
- Charlie Balch – director of photography
- DNA – production company
- Life Garland – editor
- Sam Lecca – commissioner
- Lauren Solie – producer
- Narbeh Tatoussian – colourist
- Randie Wilens – independent representative

== Release history ==
Releases dates and formats for "Bang"
Country	Date	Format(s)	Label	Ref.
United States	December 14, 2014	Digital download; streaming	RCA Records	
