= Big Fat Lie =

Studio album by Nicole Scherzinger
- Released: October 17, 2014
- Recorded: 2013–2014
- Genres: Pop; R&B
- Length: 43:59
- Label: RCA
- Producers: Godz of Analog; Carlos "Los da Mystro" McKinney; Terius "The-Dream" Nash; Bart Schoudel; Felix Snow; Christopher "Tricky" Stewart

Nicole Scherzinger chronology
Killer Love (2011)	Big Fat Lie (2014)	Sunset Blvd: The Album (2024)

Singles from Big Fat Lie
- 1. "Your Love" Released: May 30, 2014; 2. "Run" Released: September 30, 2014; 3. "On the Rocks" Released: October 10, 2014; 4. "Bang" Released: December 15, 2014

Big Fat Lie is the second studio album by American singer Nicole Scherzinger, released on October 17, 2014, by RCA Records. Scherzinger began working on the record in the summer of 2013, enlisting Terius "The-Dream" Nash and Christopher "Tricky" Stewart to executively produce the album with Felix Snow, Bart Schoudel, Chris "TEK" O'Ryan and Carlos "Los da Mystro" McKinney also contributing. The title track was inspired by Scherzinger's struggle with an eating disorder.

"Your Love" was released as the lead single from Big Fat Lie on May 30, 2014. It debuted at number six on the UK Singles Chart, and had moderate success in other international markets. "Run" was sent to US contemporary hit radio stations on September 30 as the album's lead single whilst the "On the Rocks" was released on October 10 elsewhere. "Run" was subsequently released in Great Britain, reaching the top-thirty in Scotland and top-fifty in the UK. A fourth single "Bang" was released in December 2014 but failed to chart. Big Fat Lie underperformed critically and commercially, failing to achieve any similar success to Scherzinger's debut album in any territory.

== Background ==
Following the end of the ninth series of the UK edition of The X Factor, Scherzinger shifted her focus on her second studio album. In March, she released "Boomerang" as the lead single from the project, and it managed to peak at number six on the UK Singles Chart. According to Scherzinger, will.i.am served as the executive producer of the album and worked with songwriter-producers Afrojack, Dallas Austin, Toby Gad and Sandy Vee who produced "Boomerang". Whilst planning to release the new album worldwide in November, Scherzinger unveiled that she had doubts about returning for the tenth series of The X Factor as the promotion for the album would clash with the live stages of the singing competition. She ultimately decided to return as a judge, and scrapped the album "Boomerang" was associated with. It was during this time the media reported that Scherzinger was dropped from Interscope Records, however a spokesperson for Scherzinger denied speculation and confirmed that she was working with The-Dream and Tricky Stewart.

When asked why "Boomerang" wouldn't appear on the album, she responded: "It's just going to remain a stand-alone single. In fact I did an entire album that belongs with "Boomerang". It had its own family. Unfortunately I don't know if those songs will ever be heard." She also revealed that she had recorded five albums between the release of her debut and second album, which were all scrapped.

In January 2014, it was announced that Scherzinger signed a multi-album deal with Sony Records imprint label, RCA Records. She left her long-time label, Interscope Records. For the second album, Scherzinger collaborated with The-Dream and Tricky Stewart who executive produced the record whilst a lead single would be released in the summer. In February, Scherzinger left The X Factor because she wanted to work on the new album. Sessions with The Dream and Tricky Stewart began in the summer of 2013 in Los Angeles. According to Scherzinger, "the music started to come naturally, without any outside influence, without any labels, just for us, just for music's sake."

== Release ==
On September 16, 2014, Scherzinger revealed the track listing for Big Fat Lie through Instagram via a crossword puzzle that fans had to solve. Later she unveiled the album artwork along with the title for the standard and deluxe versions of the album; the black-and-white image depicts a close-up image of Scherzinger tussling her hair. Mike Wass of Idolator noted that the image "screams early Janet Jackson." It was made available the same day for pre-order through the iTunes Store and it was confirmed that it would be released on October 17, 2014.

== Composition ==
Unlike her previous album Killer Love (2011); Big Fat Lie is a departure from the dance-pop sound for the most part, for a more R&B sound, a return to her original sound with some new elements added as well. The only full-out dance-pop song on the album is "Your Love", and on the deluxe version, "Cold World". The rest of the songs are a mix of "urban" pop, R&B, soul, and even some experimental PBR&B on the song "Heartbreaker". Nicole's vocals on the songs "Heartbreaker" and "Electric Blue" in particular, were compared to those of Janet Jackson. "Electric Blue" was compared to Janet Jackson's album The Velvet Rope (1997) for the similar production, and Nicole's sweet, soft, soothing, silky, sexy, smooth vocals. The song "Bang" was compared to the work of Ciara, specifically her Basic Instinct album (2010), which both The-Dream and Christopher "Tricky" Stewart also produced. "Just a Girl" is a "throwback to 90's R&B" with its production. "Girl With a Diamond Heart" mixes dance-pop and R&B. "First Time" is features a more traditional pop and R&B sound. "Little Boy" is a soulful ballad that is mostly free of a beat to put the focus on Nicole's vocals and lyrics. It was described as one of the most soulful songs on the album, and a mistake to only have it on the deluxe version of the album. In sound, it is similar to The-Dream's own song "Fancy", and Kelly Rowland's song "Keep It Between Us". The lyrics speak of wanting somebody that you can't have, and wanting them so much that you forget what you have already. "Unison" is a "feel good" chilled R&B track. "God of War" is a dark "angry" R&B-ish ballad, similar to the work of The Weeknd. Many of the songs incorporate The-Dream's own style into them with some new styles as well. Many liked what The-Dream did with Nicole and her music, while others criticized it for being outdated and too generic. Scherzinger said that songs from Big Fat Lie are pop and R&B with more urban influences than her previous album. She cited The Velvet Rope (1997), the sixth studio album by fellow American R&B singer Janet Jackson, and Sade as major influences. She further elaborated that the album is "vibey, it's cool, it's got a lot of soul and it's a very personal album to me."

== Promotion ==
To promote the album, Scherzinger made several media interviews on TV, radio...She starred covers of various magazines. Scherzinger first performed "Your Love" on the British chat show Alan Carr: Chatty Man on June 13, 2014. At the Isle of MTV festival in Malta, Scherzinger performed "Your Love" along with a number of songs which included songs from her former group The Pussycat Dolls. She performed while wearing black leather shorts and gold body chains and was accompanied by male and female dancers. Scherzinger also promoted the single in the UK performing on such shows as The One Show, Loose Women and Lorraine. Other promotion consisted of interviews and live acoustic performances on radio stations such as Kiss FM and 4Music.

The first televised performance of "Run" was on Access Hollywood Live on October 1. The following day, several songs of the album were played at a spin class at SoulCycle studios in New York. On October 6, she traveled to France and appeared in Le Mag and Touche pas à mon poste!. On October 14, 2014, Scherzinger gave a private concert at the Hotel Cafe Royal in London, where she sang an acoustic version of her new album. On the day of its release, she held an album signing at an HMV store in Oxford Street. On October 22, 2014, Scherzinger performed "On the Rocks" at the MOBO Awards. She also performed the song on shows such as This Morning, Surprise Surprise and Sunday Night at the Palladium. On December 12, 2014, Scherzinger performed 'Run' on The Graham Norton Show. On November 16, 2014, Scherziger performed "Run" on the eleventh series of The X Factor where she received praise for her great vocals. Although the performance was very simple with limited lighting, the original version had lasers as light effect as indicated Scherzinger in her Instagram account, but due to technical problems, could not be used. In addition, Scherzinger appeared at the Live Free Radio Birmingham festival on November 29 .She also performed at the KEY 103 Christmas Live festival, on December 4, 2014. She went to Azerbaijan to perform at the Adrenaline Festival of Azerbaijan. She also sang in France, at Saint-Etienne and at the Energy Stars For Free festival, organized by NRJ radio and held at the Hallenstadion in Zurich where Scherzinger interpreted "Your Love", "Run" and "Don't Hold Your Breath". Scherzinger also appeared at the Newcastle Metro Radio's Christmas Live festival. An acoustic set was held in the US for Perez Hilton, where she sang "Run" and Sam Smith's "Stay with me". On December 15, 2014, through her VEVO channel, Scherzinger released a music video for the song "Bang" to introduce her to the US market. During the short clip, Nicole plays with shadows, silhouettes, symmetries and demonstrates her skills hip-hop dancing skills. In February 2015 Scherzinger gave a concert in the Chaos club in Manila, Philippines after performing at a private wedding in India.

== Singles ==
The album's lead single "Your Love" was released a day after its premiere, on May 30, 2014. It generally received positive reviews from music critics who complimented the song's catchy chorus. The song peaked at number The accompanying music video was directed by Dawn Shadforth and sees Scherzinger frolicking at a beach in Malibu, California. Although BBC Radio 1 decided not to play it, the song entered the UK Singles Chart at number six and received moderate success in other international markets, peaking at number 22 in France, number 62 in Switzerland and number 99 in Germany.

"Run" was released and impacted contemporary hit radio stations on September 30 as the second single worldwide and the lead single in the US. The third single, "On the Rocks", was released on October 10, 2014, as the second single in the UK. The song received negative reviews from music critics, criticizing the outdated production and the use of Auto-Tune. The accompanying black-and-white music video was released on September 5 and depicts Scherzinger confronting her boyfriend before running outside the house liberating herself. The fourth single, "Bang", was released as a digital download in the United States on December 15, 2014. An accompanying music video was released simultaneously which showcases Scherzinger's silhouette with dance breaks along with a male dancer.

== Reception ==
=== Critical ===
Professional ratings
Review scores
Source	Rating
AllMusic	2/5 stars
Digital Spy	2.5/5 stars
Evening Standard	3/5 stars
MTV UK	3/5 stars
The Times	3/5 stars

Big Fat Lie received mixed reviews from music critics. Theo Watt of MTV UK described the Big Fat Lie as a "very likeable record" and applauded the singer for putting her "life and insecurities on a record." John Aizlewood of the Evening Standard wrote that despite its "filler" the album is a "result is an appealing unity of supertight sound, where Scherzinger suggests a more vulnerable Beyoncé." In a more mixed review Lewis Corner of Digital Spy wrote that none of the songs quite to showcase her "flying vocal range, sharp choreography and glorious demeanor". He ended the review saying that the album "reaches for something it can't quite accomplish". Stephen Thomas Erlewine of AllMusic found that the album's production "isn't particularly distinctive" and criticized Tricky Stewart and The-Dream for not bringing "their A game". He ended the review writing, "There's nothing embarrassing about their work here but there's nothing memorable, and that suits a singer who has yet to strike a memorable pose in a decade of trying."

=== Commercial ===
The album first appeared on the Irish Albums Chart at number thirty-nine. On the UK Albums Chart, the album under-performed entering at number seventeen and spending two weeks on the top 100. Following the commercial disappointment of the album, reports emerged that Scherzinger had been dropped by RCA Records, however she later clarified that she has signed a new record deal and will release new music the following year (2016 at the time of writing). Big Fat Lie also appeared on the lower regions of Belgium (Wallonia) [number 156], France (number 108) and Switzerland (number 95).

== Track listing ==
Big Fat Lie standard edition
No.	Title	Writer(s)	Producer(s)	Length
1.	"Your Love"	Terius "The-Dream" Nash; Christopher "Tricky" Stewart	Godz of Analog; Stewart; Nash; Bart Schoudel^{[a]}	4:06
2.	"Electric Blue" (featuring T.I.)	Nash; Stewart; Clifford Joseph Harris Jr.	Godz of Analog; Stewart; Nash; Schoudel	3:41
3.	"On the Rocks"	Nash; Stewart; Carlos "Los da Mystro" McKinney	Godz of Analog; Stewart; Nash; McKinney; Schoudel^{[a]}	5:07
4.	"Heartbreaker"	Nash; Stewart	Godz of Analog; Stewart; Nash; Chris "Tek" O'Ryan^{[a]}	4:59
5.	"God of War"	Nash; Stewart	Godz of Analog; Stewart; Nash; O'Ryan	3:57
6.	"Girl with a Diamond Heart"	Nash; Stewart	Godz of Analog; Stewart; Nash; O'Ryan	3:38
7.	"Just a Girl"	Nash; Stewart	Godz of Analog; Stewart; Nash; Schoudel	3:26
8.	"First Time"	Nash; Stewart	Godz of Analog; Stewart; Nash	3:19
9.	"Bang"	Nash; Stewart	Godz of Analog; Stewart; Nash; Schoudel	4:27
10.	"Big Fat Lie"	Nicole Scherzinger; Nash; Stewart	Godz of Analog; Stewart; Nash; Schoudel	3:49
11.	"Run"	Justin Tranter; Julia Michaels; Felix Snow	Snow; O'Ryan	3:30
Total length:				43:59

Big Fat Lie digital deluxe edition
No.	Title	Writer(s)	Length
12.	"Little Boy"	Nash; Stewart	3:50
13.	"Unison"	Nash; Stewart	3:48
14.	"Cold World"	Tranter; Stewart	3:26
15.	"Your Love" (music video)	Nash; Stewart	4:04
16.	"On the Rocks" (music video)	Nash; Stewart; McKinney	4:28
Total length:			63:35

Notes

- ^{^a} signifies a vocal producer

== Credits and personnel ==
Credits adapted from the liner notes of Big Fat Lie.

- Alejandro Baima – assistant engineering (track 11)
- Kevin "KD" Davis – mixing (track 4)
- Manny Dominick – additional percussion (track 1)
- Josh Drucker – assistant mixing (tracks 1–3, 5–10)
- Brian Gardner – mastering (track 1)
- Brandon Harding – assistant engineering (track 10), assistant recording (track 3)
- Jordan Lewis – additional recording (track 5), assistant recording (tracks 1–4, 6), assistant mixing (track 7)
- Carlos "Los da Mystro" McKinney – producer (track 3)
- Terius "The-Dream" Nash – producer (tracks 1–10), programming, sequencing (tracks 3, 7, 8)
- Bart Schoudel – vocal production (tracks 1–3, 7, 9, 10), engineering (tracks 1, 3, 7–10), additional recording (tracks 2, 4)
- Felix Snow – producer, mixer (track 11)
- Brian "B-LUV" Thomas – engineering (tracks 2, 3, 5, 6), additional recording (tracks 1, 3)
- Christopher "Tricky" Stewart – producer (tracks 1–10), programming, sequencing (tracks 3, 7–10)
- Pat Thrall – additional editing (track 1)
- Brent Paschke – guitar (tracks 1, 10)
- Bianca Puente – assistant engineering (track 8), additional recording (track 5), assistant recording (tracks 2, 4, 6)
- Stevy Pyne – guitar (track 3)
- Eddie Smith III – additional programming (tracks 10)
- Chris "Tek" O'Ryan – vocal production (tracks 4–6, 11), engineer (track 11), additional recording (tracks 2, 4–6), guitar (track 4)
- Nick Valentin – assistant engineering (tracks 1, 9, 12), assistant recording (tracks 1, 9, 12)
- Andrew Wuepper – mixing (tracks 1–3, 5–10)

== Charts ==
Chart performance for Big Fat Lie
Chart (2014)	Peak position
Australian Urban Albums (ARIA)	16
Belgian Albums (Ultratop Wallonia)	156
French Albums (SNEP)	108
Irish Albums (IRMA)	39
South Korean International Albums (Circle)	34
Scottish Albums (Official Charts)	19
Swiss Albums (Schweizer Hitparade)	95
UK Albums (Official Charts)	17

== Release history ==
Release history and formats for Big Fat Lie
Country	Date	Version	Format	Label	Ref
Germany	17 October 2014	Standard; deluxe	CD; digital download	Sony Music	
Ireland	17 October 2014	Standard; deluxe	CD; digital download	Sony Music	
France	20 October 2014	Standard; deluxe	CD; digital download	Sony Music	
Spain	20 October 2014	Standard; deluxe	CD; digital download	Sony Music	
United Kingdom	20 October 2014	Standard; deluxe	CD; digital download	RCA	
Italy	21 October 2014	Standard; deluxe	CD; digital download	Sony Music	
Brazil	21 October 2014	Standard; deluxe	CD; digital download	Sony Music	
Poland	21 October 2014	Standard; deluxe	CD; digital download	Sony Music	
Australia	24 October 2014	Standard; deluxe	CD; digital download	Sony Music	
United States	25 February 2022	Deluxe	Digital download, streaming	Sony Music	

== See also ==
- Nicole Scherzinger discography
- List of songs recorded by Nicole Scherzinger
