= On the Rocks (song) =

Single by Nicole Scherzinger

from the album Big Fat Lie
- Released: October 10, 2014
- Studio: Contra Recordings (California)
- Genre: R&B
- Length: 5:07
- Label: RCA
- Songwriters: Terius "The-Dream" Nash; Christopher A. Stewart; Carlos McKinney
- Producers: Godz of Analog; C. "Tricky" Stewart; Terius "The-Dream" Nash; Carlos "Los da Mystro" McKinney; Bart Schoudel

Nicole Scherzinger singles chronology
"Run" (2014)	"On the Rocks" (2014)	"Bang" (2014)

Music video
- "On the Rocks" on YouTube

"On the Rocks" is a song recorded by American singer Nicole Scherzinger for her second studio album Big Fat Lie (2014). It was written by Terius "The-Dream" Nash, C. "Tricky" Stewart and Carlos "Los da Mystro" McKinney, while the song was produced by Godz of Analog, Stewart, Nash and McKinney, with vocal production from Bart Schoudel. The song was released on October 10, 2014, by RCA Records as the third single from the record. "On the Rocks" is an R&B ballad where the singer laments and gets over about a failed relationship by pouring up a stiff drink. "On the Rocks" received negative reviews from music critics, who described it as outdated and criticized the use of Auto-Tune. The accompanying music video premiered on September 5, 2014, on Vevo.

== Background ==
On August 19, Scherzinger announced via her Instagram account, that her second single would be "On the Rocks". Along with the announcement she posted the cover artwork which shows Scherzinger wearing "a plunging white dress" in provocative pose. On August 26, Scherzinger appeared on The Radio 1 Breakfast Show hosted by Scott Mills to premiere the track on the radio program.

== Composition ==
"On the Rocks" is a power ballad further described as a "post-break up song". The instrumentation includes of "sad piano and sparse drums." Lyrically, addresses about a failed relationship and the way to get over it is by pouring up a stiff drink. At a part of the song she sings, "Let's take a shot, since you've been taking shots / And allow me to serve you this drink up on the rocks."

== Critical reception ==
Brad O'Mance, writing for Popjustice, wrote that "On the Rocks" was "by some distance the worst single of Nicole Scherzinger's entire career." Melinda Newman of HitFix described the production as "slightly dated" that could "hamper its chances at radio in the U.S.". Writing Digital Spy, Lewis Corner echoed Newman's comments adding "that zest teased with 'Your Love' quickly evaporated, leaving expectations for Big Fat Lie unbearably low. Jacques Peterson from Pop Dust opined that "the lack of success for 'Your Love,' Nicole is now playing it way too safe with the generic follow-up single." A writer for MuuMuse wondered if it's one of the strongest songs of the album and criticized the use of Auto-Tune noting Scherzinger as "a verifiably very good singer." Writing for Idolator Bradley Stern also criticized the use of Auto-Tune and noted the song could serve as a B-side to Kelly Rowland's "Rose Colored Glasses" (2010).

== Music video ==
The accompanying music video for "On the Rocks" was shot in Los Angeles, California. The visual was directed by Tim Mattia. Scherzinger said that "On The Rocks" is her favorite video she has ever done stating, "I just wanted the video to not feel like a music video, just really authentic and really raw. It's very empowering. It's a very emotional and personal song for me."

On the day the video premiered, a reviewer from Rap-Up described the video as "breathtaking". Bradley Stern, writing for Idolator described it as "appropriately dramatic" and praised Scherzinger's ability for "conveying the emotion of her music. Joanne Dorken from MTV UK classified the video as "sultry". Jacques Peterson of Pop Dust described the video as a mix between Eminem's video Love the Way You Lie and an Armani commercial.

Throughout the music video, Scherzinger is seen emoting towards her lover. Towards the end, Scherzinger finally leaves the toxic relationship with no feelings of regret.

== Live performances ==
On October 22, 2014, Scherzinger performed "On the Rocks" at the MOBO Awards. On November 7, Scherzinger performed an acoustic medley together with Sam Smith's "I'm Not the Only One" for SiriusXM Hits 1.

== Track listing ==
Digital download

1. "On the Rocks" – 5:07

Digital download – Remixes

1. On the Rocks" (Wideboys Remix) – 3:46
2. On the Rocks" (Wideboys Club Remix) – 6:23

== Credits and personnel ==
Credits adapted from the liner notes of Big Fat Lie.

Recording

- Engineered and mixed at Contra Recordings (Hollywood, California).

Personnel

- Josh Drucker – assistant mixing
- Jordan Lewis – additional recording
- Brandon Harding – assistant recording
- Carlos "Los da Mystro" McKinney – producer, songwriter
- Terius "The-Dream" Nash – producer, songwriter, sequencing, programming
- Brian "B-Luv" Thomas – additional recording
- Nicole Scherzinger – performer
- Christopher "Tricky" Stewart – producer, songwriter, sequencing, programming
- Bart Schoudel – engineer
- Stevy Pyne – guitar
- Andrew Wuepper – mixing

== Charts ==
Chart (2014)	Peak position
Scottish Singles Sales (Official Charts)	45
UK Singles (Official Charts Company)	90

== Release history ==
Country	Date	Format	Version	Label	Ref
Australia	October 10, 2014	Digital download	Wideboys remix	Sony Music	
Germany	October 10, 2014	Digital download	Wideboys remix	Sony Music	
Ireland	October 10, 2014	Digital download	Wideboys remix	Sony Music	
Ireland	October 10, 2014	Digital download	Album version	Sony Music	
Netherlands	October 10, 2014	Digital download	Wideboys remix	Sony Music	
Australia	October 12, 2014	Digital download	Album version	Sony Music	
Brazil	October 12, 2014	Digital download	Album version	Sony Music	
Canada	October 12, 2014	Digital download	Album version	Sony Music	
France	October 12, 2014	Digital download	Album version	Sony Music	
Netherlands	October 12, 2014	Digital download	Album version	Sony Music	
United Kingdom	October 12, 2014	Digital download	Album version	RCA Records	
Germany	October 15, 2014	Digital download	Album version	Sony Music	

== See also ==
- Nicole Scherzinger discography
- List of songs recorded by Nicole Scherzinger
