= Bring the Noise (game show) =

- Genre: Comedy panel game
- Presented by: Ricky Wilson
- Starring: Nicole Scherzinger; Tinie Tempah; Joel Dommett; Katherine Ryan
- Country of origin: United Kingdom
- Original language: English
- No. of series: 1
- No. of episodes: 10

Production
- Running time: 60 minutes (inc. adverts)
- Production company: Twenty Six 03

Original release
- Network: Sky 1
- Release: 22 October 2015 – 15 January 2016

Bring the Noise is a British comedy panel game show presented by Ricky Wilson. The programme made its debut on Sky 1 on 22 October 2015.

On 7 April 2016, Sky 1 announced that, due to low ratings, the show would not be returning for a second series.

== Format ==
In each and every episode, two teams of three compete and they are captained by Tinie Tempah and Nicole Scherzinger, alongside regular panelists Joel Dommett and Katherine Ryan. Their guests each week take part in rounds involving music trivia questions, games with musical set pieces and VTs which include spoof video parodies and mash-ups. The last round of each show sees the teams compete in a musical performance battle.

== Episodes ==
The coloured backgrounds denote the result of each of the shows:

– indicates Ricky's Team of the Week
– indicates a tie as Ricky's Team of the Week

Episode	First broadcast	Nicole and Joel's team	Tinie and Katherine's team
1x01	22 October 2015	Martin Kemp	David Tennant
1x02	29 October 2015	John Bradley-West	Katy B
1x03 (Note: Scherzinger was absent for this episode, so regular panelist Joel Dommett filled in as team captain.)	5 November 2015	Foxes and Melanie C	Laurence Fox
1x04	12 November 2015	Wretch 32	Olivia Colman
1x05	19 November 2015	John Newman	Theo Hutchcraft
1x06	26 November 2015	Frank Skinner	Anne-Marie
1x07	3 December 2015	Craig Roberts	Nathan Sykes
1x08	10 December 2015	David Walliams	Melanie C

== International versions ==
The TV format was exported in one country just now, that is Italy.

Country	Name	Host	Channel	Airdates
Italy	Bring the Noise	Alvin	Italia 1	28 September 2016 – 6 June 2017
