= Whatever U Like =

Single by Nicole Scherzinger featuring T.I.
- A-side: "Baby Love"
- Released: July 28, 2007
- Recorded: 2006
- Genre: Hip hop; R&B
- Length: 3:53
- Label: Interscope
- Songwriters: Sean Garrett; Clifford Harris; Nicole Scherzinger; Jamal Jones
- Producers: Polow da Don; Sean Garrett

Nicole Scherzinger singles chronology
"Come to Me" (2006)	"Whatever U Like" (2007)	"Baby Love" (2007)

T.I. singles chronology
"You Know What It Is" (2007)	"Whatever U Like" (2007)	"Hurt" (2007)

Music video
- "Whatever U Like" on YouTube

"Whatever U Like" is the debut solo single by American singer Nicole Scherzinger, featuring rapper T.I.. The duo, along with producers Sean Garrett and Polow da Don, composed the song for Scherzinger's planned debut studio album Her Name Is Nicole. "Whatever U Like" was released on July 28, 2007 on Interscope Records.

== Background and composition ==
The Pussycat Dolls debut studio album PCD (2005), was a commercial success that would end up selling 2.9 million records in the United States. The album featured number-one hit singles such as "Don't Cha" and "Buttons". The success of the group's album, spotlighted Scherzinger's work as the lead singer and began recording with other artists such as Timbaland and P. Diddy on "Come to Me" (2006); which became Scherzinger's first solo top-ten hit on the Billboard Hot 100. The collaborations furthered Scherzinger's popularity who was working on her own music over the course of two years (2005–07) and viewed the group as a stepping stone to launch her own solo career. One of the first songs recorded for her solo project, Her Name is Nicole was "Whatever U Like" which was written and produced by Polow da Don and Sean Garrett. The song was leaked early July, before being released as a digital download on July 28, 2007. Interscope Records never intended to ship the song to radio and wanted to use the single to introduce Scherzinger as a solo artist.

"Whatever U Like" is an up-tempo hip hop and R&B song with a length of three minutes and fifty-two seconds. The artists co-wrote the song with producers Sean Garrett and Polow da Don. The song's beat was compared to Kelis' "Blindfold Me" (2006) and Chilli's "Straight Jack" which were both produced by Polow da Don. Rosie Swash of The Guardian compared the "rave-horn, synth-heavy production" to the works of Timbaland. Lyrically, Scherzinger sings about doing whatever her man likes: “riding it like a Harley.” Garrett appears throughout the song repeating the lines, "Ladies and gentlemen, I know what you want! She's hot as a stove. Her name is Nicole," while T.I. appears towards the middle of the track.

== Reception ==
Rap-Up was one of the first media outlets to hear seven full tracks from Her Name is Nicole which included "Whatever U Like". A reviewer described the song as a "club banger", while commented, "It’s a perfect lead single and a good song to release in the summer." DJ Z from DJ Booth criticized the song for using the same beat and composition as Chilli's song "Straight Jack" writing: "Never a brilliant move to use a duplicate beat while dealing with a minor identity crisis, but if you’re Nicole Scherzinger, I guess it's OK?" Sal Cinquemani from Slant Magazine referred to the song while reviewing The Pussycat Dolls' second studio album Doll Domination (2008). He agreed with DJ Z writing it was a, "blatant rip-off of Kelis's 'Blindfold Me.'"; however he did write the song "was unjustly ignored." Adam Vary of Entertainment Weekly commented, "'Whatever U Like' is no 'London Bridge' — and that’s not exactly a high bar to reach."

In the United States, "Whatever U Like" failed to make a chart appearance on the Billboard Hot 100 but peaked at number 4 on the Bubbling Under Hot 100 Singles chart. It additionally stalled at number 73 on the US Digital Songs and number 83 on the US Pop Songs. In Canada, the song fared better, managing to peak at number 57 on the Canadian Hot 100.

== Music video ==
The official music video was directed by Paul Hunter who previously directed the Pussycat Dolls' debut single "Don't Cha" (2005). Filming concluded on May 25, 2007 in San Pedro, California. On August 9, a short clip was leaked online. On August 20, Scherzinger appeared on TRL to premiere the music video.

=== Synopsis ===
The video begins with spotlights hitting a wall, with Scherzinger running from an unidentified person, revealed to be four masked kidnappers. Sean Garrett performs his opening sequence as Scherzinger is captured and concealed within a box, where she performs the first verse and chorus, before escaping the box. Scenes of Scherzinger floating through water are interspersed with her dancing before a spotlighted stage, and performing in front of a black background. Throughout the next chorus, Scherzinger is shown walking along a bench covered in steaming stones. During T.I.'s rap, the two are concealed in the box, with Scherzinger seductively crawling all over him. Next Scherzinger is shown covered in mud before standing beneath a shower washing it off. Different shots of the singer from the previous scenes are spliced together throughout the next chorus. Scherzinger is now shown in a black leather outfit during Sean Garrett's verse dancing before a backdrop, with spotlights shining on her, spliced with scenes of the producer rapping, her former assailants now dance in front of her. The video ends with Scherzinger leaving the backdrop.

=== Reception ===
Leah Greenblatt of Entertainment Weekly graded the music video B− adding that it "badly needs levity, and more of the T.I. cameo."

== Live performances ==
Scherzinger performed the song for the first time on the finale of the third season of the U.S. television show So You Think You Can Dance on August 17, 2007. On September 9, Scherzinger performed the song along with Lil Wayne, who filled in for T.I. at the pre-show of the 2007 MTV Video Music Awards. Scherzinger was wearing a "red cocktail dress, black boots and leather gloves." Gil Kaufman commented, "Before Brown had them pounding the stage in excitement or Britney had them scratching their heads in confusion, Pussycat Dolls lead kitten Nicole Scherzinger got the party started early during the preshow with a sizzling hookup with Lil Wayne." He continued, "They made an interesting team on a night that was full of many different varieties of hookups." Kelefa Sanneh of The New York Times agreed with Kaufman describing the performance as "one of the best musical moments came before the show started." On September 27, Scherzinger performed on Yahoo!'s Pepsi Smash. The following month she performed at KIIS-FM’s Homecoming concert at the Honda Center and performed "Whatever U Like", "Baby Love", and "Supervillain".

== Track listing ==
- Digital download
1. "Whatever U Like" (featuring T.I.) – 3:53

== Charts ==
=== Weekly charts ===
Chart (2007)	Peak position
Australia (ARIA Digital Track Chart)	32
Canada Hot 100 (Billboard)	57
CIS Airplay (TopHit)	42
Czech Republic Airplay (ČNS IFPI)	50
Romania (Romanian Top 100)	10
US Bubbling Under Hot 100 (Billboard)	4
US Bubbling Under R&B/Hip-Hop Singles (Billboard)	13
US Digital Song Sales (Billboard)	73
US Hot Singles Sales (Billboard)	48

=== Year-end charts ===
Chart (2007)	Position
CIS (Tophit)	158

== Release history ==
Release dates and formats for "Whatever U Like"
Region	Date	Format	Label	Ref.
United States	August 28, 2007	Digital download; 12"	Interscope	
