= Your Love (Nicole Scherzinger song) =

Single by Nicole Scherzinger

from the album Big Fat Lie
- Released: May 30, 2014
- Studio: California (Grundman Mastering), Triangle Sound West, Contra Recording); Florida (Setai Recording)
- Genre: Pop; dance
- Length: 4:05
- Label: RCA
- Songwriters: Terius "The-Dream" Nash; Christopher A. Stewart
- Producers: C. "Tricky" Stewart; Terius "The-Dream" Nash; Godz of Analog

Nicole Scherzinger singles chronology
"Missing You" (2013)	"Your Love" (2014)	"Run" (2014)

Music video
- "Your Love" on YouTube

"Your Love" is a song recorded by American singer Nicole Scherzinger for her second studio album Big Fat Lie (2014). It was written by Terius "The-Dream" Nash and C. "Tricky" Stewart and produced by the duo alongside Godz of Analog, with vocal production provided by Bart Schoudel. The song was released on May 30, 2014, by RCA Records as the lead single marking its first release since signing a deal with Sony Music Entertainment.

"Your Love" is a house-influenced, dance and pop song which is built on a 1990s-inspired rave piano-driven beat. It received positive reviews from music critics, many of whom highlighted the chorus as its main appeal. However several critics dismissed the song's lyrics. In the United Kingdom, although BBC Radio 1 decided not to play it, the song entered the UK Singles Chart at number six and reached the top-forty of the charts in France and Ireland.

== Background ==
Following the end of the ninth series of the UK edition of The X Factor, Scherzinger shifted her focus on her second studio album. In March, she released "Boomerang" as the lead single from the project, and it managed to peak at number six on the UK Singles Chart. According to Scherzinger, will.i.am served as the executive producer of the album and worked with songwriter-producers Afro Jack, Dallas Austin, Toby Gad and Sandy Vee who produced "Boomerang". Whilst planning to release the new album worldwide in November, Scherzinger unveiled that she had doubts about returning for the tenth series of The X Factor as the promotion for the album would clash with the live stages of the singing competition. She ultimately decided to return as a judge, and scrapped the album "Boomerang" was associated with. It was during this time the media reported that Scherzinger was dropped from Interscope Records, however a spokesperson for Scherzinger denied speculation and confirmed that she was working with The-Dream and Tricky Stewart.

In February 2014, it was announced that Scherzinger signed a multi-album deal with RCA Records (Sony Music Entertainment) whilst confirming that the lead single would be released during the summer. Scherzinger stated that she left Interscope Records as she felt that it was "time to make a change" and revealed that they didn't put out her previous album. On May 20 Scherzinger revealed via Twitter that she was filming a music video for her new single on a Malibu beach. Three days later Scherzinger confirmed the song's title and announced that it would premiere on radio on May 29. The song marks Scherzinger's first release since signing a deal with Sony Records. On the same day an 18-second snippet of the song was leaked on the internet featuring a part of the first verse and the pre-chorus. The singer debuted the full song on her official SoundCloud account on May 29.

== Composition ==
"Your Love" is a four-minute and 5-second house-influenced, dance and pop song. Built on a 1990s-inspired "bright piano-led beat" the song's instrumentation also contains "synth trumpets". Bradley Stern from the website MuuMuse noted that Scherzinger opts to moan and do "sultry, filtered near-whispers" throughout the song.

Lyrically, Scherzinger sings how her man's love makes her feel. The song begins with a rave piano-driven beat with Scherzinger repeating "yeah" and "woo". On the first verse she sings “Something ’bout you so enticing, even when I try to fight it / Knock me out like Michael Tyson / I’ll do whatever you want” over the galloping beat. The pre-chorus follows, with her pleading the lines, "I’m never letting you go baby, I love you so baby!" The song's chorus comprises a "do-do-do-do-do" vocal hook, which was compared to the Black Eyed Peas' "Boom Boom Pow" (2009).

== Critical reception ==
A writer for Popjustice wrote a positive review naming it "a triumph" and because "it doesn’t sound like any other hit songs." The writer continued saying the song is "a ridiculously elegant single: precision-tooled for pop supremacy but sparsely produced and as a result rather more stylish than the smack round the head with a sack of spanners that was 'Poison' (2010)." Upon hearing the 18-second snippet Idolator's Mike Wess wrote that it "sounds like a surefire smash." Robbie Daw of the same website called it her first truly great single since "Don't Hold Your Breath" (2011) and noted that although "the snippets sounded promising, they didn’t indicate just how infectious 'Your Love' really is." Jason Lipshutz of Billboard described "Your Love" as an "irresistible pop track" that anyone "could reasonably add to their ongoing 'Summer Jams' playlist." Lipshutz went on to praise the song's chorus as the "main appeal" of the song. Bradley Stern from the website MuuMuse described the song as a "refreshing sound for [Scherzinger]." Nolan Feeney from Time magazine also singled out the song's chorus describing it as "catchy" whilst noting the song could bring her success in the United States. Lewis Corner of Digital Spy gave the song four and a half stars out of five, saying that the song "feels like the smash she needs to make happen." He also complimented the production "that edges her sound forward without abandoning the energetic charge of her earlier work." While reviewing Big Fat Lie, Rory Cashin of Entertainment.ie found it smart that "Your Love" was released as the first single but dismissed the song's lyrics. Chris DeVille from the website Stereogum also found the lyrics secondary to the song's melody but wrote that the song is "above the former Pussycat Doll’s usual dreck." Alex Kritelis of Bustle magazine was ambivalent; although he had positive reception towards the song's production, he criticized the lyrics on the first verse—“Knock me out like Michael Tyson”—for referencing domestic violence calling it "extremely problematic" and noted "there’s no excuse for trying to put a 'positive spin' on violence.

== Commercial performance ==
"Your Love" made its first chart appearance on the South Korean International Gaon Single Chart at number 96 for the week ending June 8, 2014, due to digital download sales of 2,044. In Australia, the song debuted and peaked at number fifty one on the Australian Singles Chart on June 21, 2014, marked her first chart appearance in over three years and her fifth song as a lead artist to enter the top 100.

In the United Kingdom, BBC Radio 1 decided not to playlist Scherzinger' single as "it wasn't considered a priority track" to their target audience. A BBC Radio 1 spokesman said that it's nothing personal against her adding the radio station "plays a much wider range of artists than commercial radio – they largely concentrate on playing hits." According to the Official Charts Company, the song was at number two on the UK Singles Chart, being held of by Rixton's "Me and My Broken Heart" by a margin of nearly 12,000 copies after two days of availability as reported in their mid-week chart report. It ultimately debuted at number six on the chart with, becoming Scherzinger's seventh top-ten song in Britain as a solo artist. Elsewhere in Europe the track performed moderately peaking at number 22 in France. In there, the song entered at number 198, becoming Scherzinger's lowest solo entry in France. It entered in the top 100 in early September 2014 and reached the top thirty mid-October 2014, becoming Scherzinger third solo top thirty in there. It peaked at number 62 in Switzerland and number 99 in Germany equally.

== Music video ==
The music video for "Your Love" was shot on May 19, 2014, in Malibu, California. The music video was directed by Dawn Shadforth and filmed on a beach. Scherzinger took to Twitter to confirm that she was filming the music video, writing: "Beautiful day on the beach! On the set of my new music video for my first single... [coming soon]," along with a short video. The music video is later published on June 9, 2014, on Scherzinger's YouTube channel.

The video depicts Nicole singing on the beach, with beautiful scenery shown and dances taking place reminiscent of a Caribbean setting. The video ends with Scherzinger sitting wrapped in a beach towel on the sand, with fire and lighting effects in a small forest appearing bright and colorful.

== Live performances ==
Scherzinger first performed "Your Love" on the British chat show Alan Carr: Chatty Man on June 13, 2014. At the Isle of MTV festival in Malta on June 25, 2014, Scherzinger performed "Your Love" along with a number of songs which included songs from her former group the Pussycat Dolls. She performed while wearing black leather shorts and gold body chains and was accompanied by male and female dancers. On October 4, she traveled to France and performed "Your Love" along with "Don't Cha" and "Run" at the NRJ Music Tour in Saint-Etienne. The following day she sang the song for French television shows Le Mag and Touche pas à mon poste!. On October 15, she held an acoustic showcase of her album at Hotel Café Royal. "Your Love" was performed as the opening track.

== Track listing ==
Digital download

1. "Your Love" – 4:05

Remixes – EP

1. "Your Love" (Cahill Radio Remix) – 3:23
2. "Your Love" (Cahill Club Remix) – 5:54
3. "Your Love" (Mike Delinquent Radio Remix) – 3:03
4. "Your Love" (Mike Delinquent Club Remix) – 4:40
5. "Your Love" (Belanger Remix) – 5:06

== Credits and personnel ==
Credits adapted from via JB Hi-Fi.

- Josh Drucker – assistant engineer
- Manny Dominick – percussion
- Brian Gardner – mastering engineer
- Jordan Lewis – assistant engineer
- Terius "The-Dream" Nash – producer, songwriter
- Brian Thomas – recording engineer
- Brent Paschke – guitar
- Nicole Scherzinger – performer
- Bart Schoudel – producer, songwriter
- Christopher "Tricky" Stewart – producer, songwriter
- Bart Schoudel – producer, engineer
- Pat Thrall – editor
- Andrew Wuepper – mixing engineer

== Charts ==
=== Weekly charts ===
Chart (2014)	Peak position
Australia (ARIA)	51
Ireland (IRMA)	30
Euro Digital Song Sales (Billboard)	16
Belgium (Ultratip Bubbling Under Flanders)	27
Belgium (Ultratop 50 Wallonia)	41
CIS Airplay (TopHit)	117
France (SNEP)	22
France Airplay (SNEP)	19
Germany (GfK)	99
Scottish Singles Sales (Official Charts)	2
Switzerland (Schweizer Hitparade)	67
South Korea International Singles (Gaon)	96
UK Singles (Official Charts)	6

=== Year-end charts ===
Chart (2014)	Position
France (SNEP)	186

== Certifications ==
Certifications for "Your Love"
Region	Certification	Certified units/sales
United Kingdom (BPI)	Silver	200,000^{‡}
^{‡} Sales+streaming figures based on certification alone.

== Release history ==
Country	Date	Format	Label	Ref
Belgium	May 30, 2014	Digital download	Sony	
Finland	May 30, 2014	Digital download	Sony	
Portugal	May 30, 2014	Digital download	Sony	
Sweden	May 30, 2014	Digital download	Sony	
France	June 2, 2014	Digital download	Sony	
Italy	June 3, 2014	Digital download	Sony	
Canada	June 6, 2014	Digital download	Sony	
Australia	June 13, 2014	Digital download	Sony	
New Zealand	June 13, 2014	Digital download	Sony	
Germany	July 11, 2014	Digital download	Sony	
Germany	July 11, 2014	Digital download (Remixes)	Sony	
Ireland	July 11, 2014	Digital download	Sony	
United Kingdom	July 13, 2014	Digital download	RCA	

== See also ==
- Nicole Scherzinger discography
- List of songs recorded by Nicole Scherzinger
