= Run (Nicole Scherzinger song) =

Single by Nicole Scherzinger

from the album Big Fat Lie
- Released: September 30, 2014
- Studio: Larrabee Sound (California); LOL Palace (California); Mastering Palace (New York)
- Length: 3:30
- Label: RCA
- Songwriters: Justin Tranter; Julia Michaels; Felix Snow
- Producer: Felix Snow

Nicole Scherzinger singles chronology
"Your Love" (2014)	"Run" (2014)	"On the Rocks" (2014)

Music video
- "Run" on YouTube

"Run" is a song recorded by American singer Nicole Scherzinger for her second studio album, Big Fat Lie (2014). It was written by Justin Tranter, Julia Michaels and Felix Snow of which the latter produced it alongside Chris "Tek" O'Ryan. The song was released on September 30, 2014, to contemporary hit radio by Epic Records in the United States as the lead single; however the release was never materialized. A piano-ballad which also includes dramatic strings, "Run" offers advice to the next broken heart.

The track garnered a positive response from music critics who praised Scherzinger's strong and emotive vocal performance and highlighted it as an album stand-out. Its accompanying music video was premiered through Vevo on October 12, 2014, and features Scherzinger in an opulent mansion. Commercially, "Run" failed to chart in the United States but charted on the Irish Singles Chart and UK Singles Chart at number 63 and 46 respectively.

== Background ==
In an interview with Idolator on October 14, with regards "Run's" release in the United States she said, "we did something quite unexpected that I don’t even think we realized we were gonna do. We actually had plans for another single, I guess we just took a leap of faith and believed in this song so much."

== Composition ==
"Run" is vulnerable piano ballad where Scherzinger gives advice to the next girl in lines such as, "Don’t let him lead you to the dark / Don’t tell him all your secrets / He’ll leave you with a broken heart." According to Mike Wess "Run" showcases the singer's "underrated pipes."

== Critical reception ==
Alex Kritelis of Bustle magazine described "Run" as "one of the most powerful ballads" but felt that the song wouldn't become a hit. Lewis Corner of Digital Spy praised Scherzinger for her "soul-baring vocal performance and stripped-down production proving Nicole's undeniable talent." Rory Cashin of Entertainment.ie agreed with Corner highlighting it as an album standout and "a great way to close out the album." Mike Wass described of "Idolator" described the song as "beautifully understated ballad" and felt the "lyrics are genuinely heartfelt." Chris DeVille from the website Stereogum described "Run" as the strongest material she's offered and lauded her decision to release it as he felt that "maybe her destiny is not steamy club jams with elaborate dance numbers but belting out torch songs in formal dresses at ornate theaters."

== Music video ==
In an interview with Idolator on October 14, while discussing the concept for the music video Scherzinger stated there was possibility that "Run" would have two videos one for the United Kingdom which she described as a "one-take live video" and one for the United States. With regards to the US version she stated that, "it’s pretty much going to be a one-take video that’s very simple and stripped back." On November 6, 2014, gave an interview with E! News and delivered a sneak peek of the video. Several days later Glamour magazine posted pictures from the set of the music video features Scherzinger draped in a blanket, looking intensely in a mirror and lying on the floor. The music video premiered on November 12 on Vevo. The video was described "subtle" and features Scherzinger in an opulent mansion. The majority of the video shows the singer lying on the floor in a slip before walking around her mansion and emoting for the camera. The video ends with Scherzinger looking into a mirror.

== Live performances ==
On September 30, 2014, Scherzinger performed "Run" for the first time on Access Hollywood Live. Mike Wass of Idolator praised Scherzinger's ability to "[ooze] raw emotion and [deliver] goosebumps-inducing vocal acrobatics." On October 15, she held an acoustic showcase of her album at Hotel Café Royal. "Run" was performed as the closing track. On November 16, 2014, Scherzinger performed "Run" on the eleventh series of The X Factor.

== Credits and personnel ==
Credits adapted from the liner notes of Big Fat Lie.

Recording

- Engineered at Larrabee Studios; (Universal City, California)
- Mixed at LOL Palace; (Los Angeles, California)

Personnel

- Alejandro Baima – assistant engineer
- Julia Michaels – songwriter
- Chris "Tek" O'Ryan – vocal producer, engineer
- Nicole Scherzinger – performer
- Felix Snow – producer, songwriter, mixer
- Justin Tranter – songwriter

== Track listings ==
Digital download

1. "Run" – 3:30

Remix single

1. "Run" (Moto remix) [radio edit] – 3:23
2. "Run" (Moto club remix) – 6:30

== Charts ==
Weekly peak performance for "Run"
Chart (2014)	Peak position
ERROR in "CIS": Invalid position: 275. Expected number 1–200 or dash (–).
Ireland (IRMA)	63
Scottish Singles Sales (Official Charts)	26
UK Singles (Official Charts)	46

== Release history ==
Country	Date	Format	Label	Ref
Australia	September 30, 2014	Digital download	Sony Music	
Belgium	September 30, 2014	Digital download	Sony Music	
Canada	September 30, 2014	Digital download	Sony Music	
France	September 30, 2014	Digital download	Sony Music	
Germany	September 30, 2014	Digital download	Sony Music	
New Zealand	September 30, 2014	Digital download	Sony Music	
Spain	September 30, 2014	Digital download	Sony Music	
Switzerland	September 30, 2014	Digital download	Sony Music	
United States	September 30, 2014	Digital download	Epic	
United States	September 30, 2014	Contemporary hit radio	Epic	
United Kingdom	December 14, 2014	Digital download	RCA	
