= Baby Love (Nicole Scherzinger song) =

2007 single by Nicole Scherzinger and will.i.am

Single by Nicole Scherzinger featuring will.i.am
- B-side: "Whatever U Like"
- Released: September 18, 2007
- Genre: R&B
- Length: 4:43
- Label: A&M; Interscope
- Songwriters: Kara DioGuardi; Nicole Scherzinger; Keith Harris; William Adams
- Producer: will.i.am

Nicole Scherzinger singles chronology
"Whatever U Like" (2007)	"Baby Love" (2007)	"Scream" (2007)

will.i.am singles chronology
"I Got It from My Mama" (2007)	"Baby Love" (2007)	"Wait a Minute (Just a Touch)" (2007)

Music video
- "Baby Love" on YouTube

"Baby Love" is a song recorded by American singer Nicole Scherzinger. The song was produced by and features will.i.am. Scherzinger and will.i.am co-wrote the song with Kara DioGuardi and Keith Harris. "Baby Love" was released from September 18, 2007, by A&M and Interscope Records, as the second single from Scherzinger's unreleased debut studio album, Her Name Is Nicole. The folk-inspired R&B ballad is about a person's first premature love with someone.

"Baby Love" received a mixed reception from contemporary critics, with reviewers complementing Scherzinger's vocal ability, but dismissing the song for not being the type of song to launch a career with. However, the song managed to peak in the top twenty in thirteen countries including Germany, Italy, Switzerland, United Kingdom and Ireland. An accompanying music video directed by Francis Lawrence and was filmed on Catalina Island in California. Scherzinger performed "Baby Love" in a series of live appearances such as a performance at the MTV Europe Music Awards 2007.

== Background and composition ==
Following the poor commercial success of "Whatever U Like", it was announced that Scherzinger would release a new single. The song was used for German Vybemobile's TV commercial and Samsung's campaign. "Baby Love" is included on several international editions of The Pussycat Dolls' second studio album Doll Domination (2008) and is listed as an original song, performed by Scherzinger and will.i.am entitled as the "Final Version" on the standard edition. The version on the album is the official remix of the song by J. R. Rotem with a new arrangement and re-recorded vocals.

"Baby Love" is a mid-tempo folk-inspired R&B ballad, and produced by will.i.am. It was written by Scherzinger, William Adams, Kara DioGuardi and Keith Harris, in the musical key of F minor. The "laid-back vibe" of the song was compared to that of the Pussycat Dolls' song "Stickwitu" (2005) and Fergie's song "Big Girls Don't Cry" (2006), that was also produced by will.i.am. According to the sheet music published by Sony/ATV Music Publishing, the song has a time signature set in common time, with a tempo of 90 beats per minute. The melody is mainly composed with piano and guitar instruments.

== Reception ==
"Baby Love" (2007)
A sample of "Baby Love"'s chorus, backed by guitars and drums.

A reviewer for the Manchester Evening News wrote that it's "a nice little number which highlights her above average vocals."

The single achieved reasonable success outside of the United States, particularly in Europe. This is likely due to Scherzinger's performance at the MTV Europe Music Awards 2007 on November 1, 2007, in which she sang the song with will.i.am, the producer and featured artist of the song. The song peaked at number fourteen on the UK Singles Chart. It also became a top ten hit in the Germany and Italy. Although the song was not successful on the Billboard Hot 100, it reached number four on the Billboard Hot Dance Club Play and peaked at number 8 at Bubbling Under Hot 100 chart.

== Music video ==
The video was shot on Catalina Island, California, and was directed by Francis Lawrence. The music video premiered on September 24, 2007.

=== Synopsis ===
The video opens with Scherzinger in bed, inserting a video memory stick into a laptop. She is just in her white bra and panties. We then see lots of clouds, before seeing Scherzinger waking up lying in bed with her lover. She rolls on top of him, before going outside still in her underwear with a grey cardigan over the top. The boat then cruises along and Nicole makes several appearances in a white bikini. Then we see her lie on a sun bed under her lover in a black bikini. He is shirtless, and gazes down at her. She then shows the video footage to him on her camera. She then sings to the camera presumably naked, with us only seeing her face and her legs. She then lies in the sun in her white bikini. She then dives into the ocean in her black bikini, followed by her lover. They then appear underwater, hugging each other. After that, on a beach, Nicole kisses her lovers shoulders. She then dances in front of the camera in a black and peach bikini. She then is seen hugging her lover (they both are presumed naked, making love) on the beach. Nicole and her lover take a trip on a motorbike (a Ducati Hypermotard) soon after. Nicole is in hot pants and a black jacket. Will.i.am then makes his debut singing a solo verse in the distance.

We then see Nicole in her black and peach bikini lying down on the sand. Her lover is filming her from above. Nicole then is seen semi nude, with her hands covering her breasts. Then she is seen playing around with her lover in the sea. They splash around and Nicole then is seen on the edge of the boat, in a blue dress. More semi nude appearances follow. But then we return to the bed, which was seen at the start. Nicole is now kneeling on top of her boyfriend, in her white bra and panties. She sings to him whilst he strokes her hips and touches the sides of her panties. She then leans down to kiss his cheek softly. He kisses her arm. The video ends with Scherzinger making one final semi nude appearance, covering her breasts with her hands. She giggles and the scene fades.

== Live performances ==
In October 2007 she performed at KIIS-FM’s Homecoming concert at the Honda Center and performed "Whatever U Like", "Baby Love" and "Supervillain". The same month she performed the latter two songs along with "Happily Never After" for Sessions@AOL.

== Track listings ==
- Digital download
1. "Baby Love" (featuring will.i.am) – 4:43
- German and UK CD single
1. "Baby Love" (featuring will.i.am) – 4:43
2. "Whatever U Like" (featuring T.I.) – 3:53
- Australian and German enhanced CD single
1. "Baby Love" (featuring will.i.am) – 4:43
2. "Whatever U Like" (featuring T.I.) – 3:53
3. "Baby Love" (instrumental) – 4:43
4. "Baby Love" (video) – 4:43
- Japanese CD single
1. "Baby Love" (featuring will.i.am) – 4:43
2. "Whatever U Like" (featuring T.I.) – 3:53
3. "Baby Love" (instrumental) – 4:43
4. "Whatever U Like" (instrumental) – 3:53
5. "Baby Love" (video) – 4:51
6. "Whatever U Like" (video) – 3:56

== Credits and personnel ==
Credits are adapted from the "Baby Love" liner notes.

- Nicole Scherzinger – songwriter and vocals
- will.i.am (William Adams) – songwriter, producer and vocals
- Kara DioGuardi – songwriter
- Keith Harris – songwriter

== Charts ==
=== Weekly charts ===
Chart (2007–2008)	Peak position
Australia (ARIA)	58
Australian Urban (ARIA)	15
Austria (Ö3 Austria Top 40)	21
Belgium (Ultratip Bubbling Under Flanders)	2
Belgium (Ultratip Bubbling Under Wallonia)	7
CIS Airplay (TopHit)	178
Czech Republic Airplay (ČNS IFPI)	4
Denmark (Tracklisten)	37
Europe (Eurochart Hot 100)	13
Germany (GfK)	5
Hungary (Rádiós Top 40)	11
Ireland (IRMA)	15
Italy (FIMI)	9
Netherlands (Dutch Top 40)	27
Netherlands (Single Top 100)	56
Norway (VG-lista)	10
Poland (Airplay Chart)	4
Romania (Romanian Top 100)	9
Scottish Singles Sales (Official Charts)	13
Slovakia Airplay (ČNS IFPI)	8
Sweden (Sverigetopplistan)	51
Switzerland (Schweizer Hitparade)	14
UK Singles (Official Charts)	14
UK Hip Hop/R&B (Official Charts)	5
US Bubbling Under Hot 100 (Billboard)	8
US Dance Club Songs (Billboard)	4

=== Year-end charts ===
Chart (2007)	Position
UK Singles (OCC)	183

== Release history ==
Release dates and formats for "Baby Love"
Region	Date	Format(s)	Label	Ref(s).
United States	September 18, 2007	Contemporary hit radio; digital download	Interscope	
Germany	October 23, 2007	CD	Universal	
Australia	November 5, 2007	CD	Interscope	
United Kingdom	November 5, 2007	CD	Interscope	
Japan	November 30, 2007	CD	Universal	
