= Nicole Scherzinger =

American singer (born 1978)

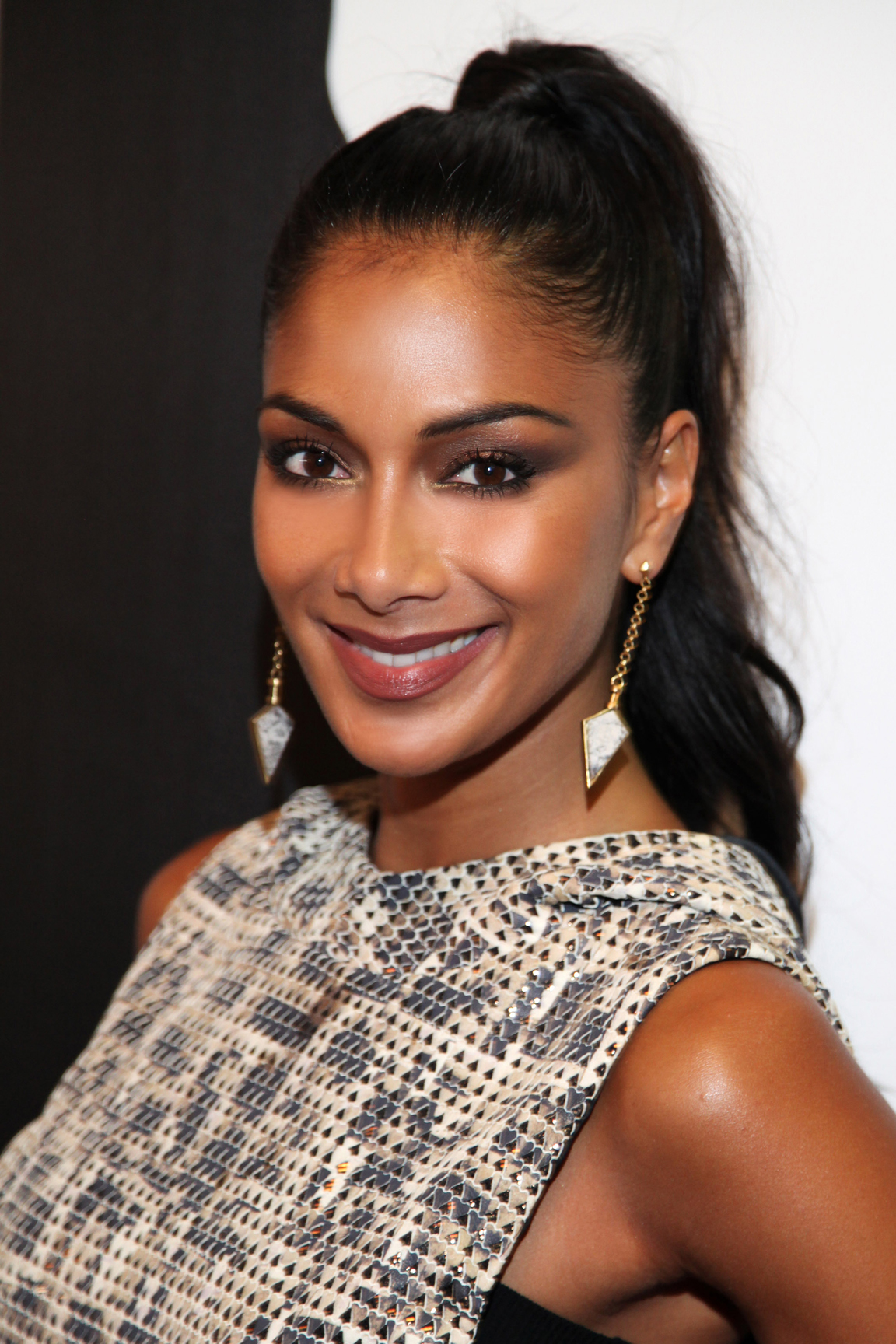
- Scherzinger in 2012
- Born: Nicole Prascovia Elikolani Valiente (Note: Incorrectly given as "Prescovia" in some sources.); June 29, 1978 (age 48); Honolulu, Hawaii, U.S.
- Occupations: Singer; songwriter; dancer; actress; television personality
- Years active: 1997–present
- Partners: Lewis Hamilton (2007–2015); Grigor Dimitrov (2015–2019); Thom Evans (2020–present; engaged)
- Musical career
- Origin: Louisville, Kentucky, U.S.; Los Angeles, California, U.S.
- Genres: R&B; pop; hip-hop; dance
- Instruments: Vocals
- Labels: A&M; Interscope; RCA; Epic
- Member of: The Pussycat Dolls
- Formerly of: Eden's Crush

Nicole Prascovia Elikolani Scherzinger (/ˈʃɜːrzɪŋər/ SHUR-zing-ər; née Valiente; born June 29, 1978) is an American singer, songwriter, dancer, actress and television personality. She is the lead singer of the R&B and pop group the Pussycat Dolls, one of the world's best-selling female groups of all time.

Born in Honolulu, Hawaii, and raised in Louisville, Kentucky, Scherzinger began acting at the age of 14 and studied musical theatre at Wright State University. In pursuit of a musical career, Scherzinger accepted an offer to sing background vocals to American rock band Days of the New's second self-titled album and its supporting tour. She later found mild success with Eden's Crush, a girl group created through The WB's television talent competition Popstars. Scherzinger pursued further acting and music opportunities, before gaining international recognition as the lead singer of the girl group the Pussycat Dolls, which released two albums and sold over 55 million records worldwide. Following the group's initial disbandment, Scherzinger pursued a solo career, releasing the albums Killer Love (2011) and Big Fat Lie (2014).

Scherzinger has served as a judge on television talent shows, including The Sing-Off (2009–2010), The X Factor USA (2011), The X Factor UK (2012–2013, 2016–2017), Australia's Got Talent (2019), and The Masked Singer US (2019–2023). In 2010, she competed on the television dancing competition Dancing with the Stars, in which she won. Other work during this period includes her theatrical roles in Cats (2014) and Sunset Boulevard (2023–2025), as well as roles in the Disney animated film Moana (2016), the ABC film Dirty Dancing (2017), and the NBC special Annie Live! (2021).

During her career, Scherzinger has received nominations for a Grammy, two Laurence Olivier Awards and a Tony Award. She won the 2024 Laurence Olivier Award for Best Actress in a Musical for her performance as Norma Desmond in the 2023 West End revival of Sunset Boulevard and received the Tony Award for Best Actress in a Musical in 2025 when the show transferred to Broadway in 2024. Her other ventures include clothing lines; a fragrance; and serving as an ambassador for the Special Olympics and as a supporter of UNICEF UK.

== Early life ==
Nicole Prascovia Elikolani Valiente was born on June 29, 1978, in Honolulu, Hawaii, to Alfonso Valiente and Rosemary Elikolani. Valiente is of Filipino descent and Elikolani is of Native Hawaiian, Polish, Russian, and Ukrainian descent. Her father divorced her mother and left the family when Scherzinger was two years old. Elikolani then married German-American Gary Scherzinger, who adopted her, and whose surname she eventually took. She has a younger half-sister, Keala. When Scherzinger was six, they moved to Louisville, Kentucky, where her mother was a clerk and her step-father was a welder. Scherzinger describes her upbringing as difficult as she grew up "without much money" and supported her parents by being a waitress, taking local modelling jobs, and being part of an entertainment troupe of the local amusement park, Kentucky Kingdom. With her grandfather a priest, Scherzinger was raised Roman Catholic and considered herself conservative with "really strong religious beliefs" and would go to church twice a week in order to make her mother proud.

At the age of 14, Scherzinger joined the Actors Theatre of Louisville, where she was cast in her first professional play, La Bête. She graduated in 1996 from the Youth Performing Arts School (YPAS) at duPont Manual High School, where she participated in many plays, including Alice in Wonderland, in which she portrayed Alice. She was surprised she got the part as she was up "against a girl with blue eyes and blonde hair". In 2007, she was inducted into DuPont Manual Alumni's Hall of Fame as one of the youngest inductees. Since 2013, she has endowed YPAS with a yearly $2,000, namesake scholarship. After earning a scholarship, she attended Wright State University in Dayton, Ohio, where she majored in Theatre Arts with a Dance minor.

During this period, Scherzinger garnered the lead roles in regional productions of the musicals Chicago, Guys and Dolls, and Show Boat. In her final year of college, she was hired by Days of the New band leader Travis Meeks to contribute vocals on their self-titled second studio album. Meeks sought out a singer who could "deliver some more world/operatic textures and sounds." The album's supporting tour followed, which led Scherzinger to drop out of college. Towards the tour's conclusion, Meeks stated that the two grew apart creatively, claiming she "didn't seem to understand music very well" but noted she is an "amazing entertainer". In 2018, she received the 2017 Alumna of the Year Award from the Wright State Alumni Association.

== Career ==
=== 2001–2002: Eden's Crush ===
In 2001, Scherzinger's mother saw a commercial for the WB's show Popstars USA, a reality series with the aim to chronicle a music group's formation until the recording of their debut album. Warner Bros. imprint London-Sire Records signed the group to a recording contract before the band was named and had finalized its membership, due to the hours of network television exposure the group would receive. Initially reluctant to audition, Scherzinger later changed her mind, seeing it as an opportunity to travel to Los Angeles. For her audition she sang Whitney Houston's version of Dolly Parton's song "I Will Always Love You".

Along with Ana Maria Lombo, Maile Misajon, Ivette Sosa, and Rosanna Tavarez, Scherzinger established the girl group Eden's Crush. Their debut single, "Get Over Yourself", was released in March 2001 and debuted at number eight on the Billboard Hot 100; it became the first female act to debut at number one on the Hot 100 Singles Sales chart. Their debut studio album, Popstars (2001), debuted at number six on the Billboard 200 chart. They went on to tour with 'N Sync and Jessica Simpson, but, by the end of the year, their label went bankrupt and the group disbanded. During this time, will.i.am, front man of The Black Eyed Peas, approached Scherzinger to become a member of the group, but her then-boyfriend, Nick Hexum, declined. Following the band's dissolution, Scherzinger took a detour into acting and guest-starred in television shows such as My Wife and Kids (2002) and had a cameo in the independent comedy, Chasing Papi (2003).

=== 2003–2009: The Pussycat Dolls ===
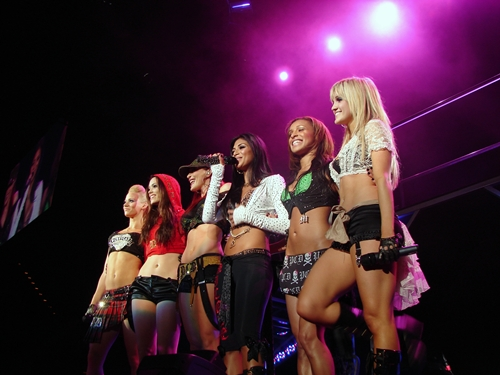
The Pussycat Dolls performing in 2006

In August 2003, opting for a solo recording contract, Scherzinger traveled to Arista Records office in New York with a demo CD of her own written material under her Hawaiian family name Nicole Kea. Her performance was interrupted by a citywide blackout, and she was forced to leave. Meanwhile, Robin Antin, the creator of the burlesque troupe the Pussycat Dolls, struck a joint venture with Interscope Records and, along with record producers Jimmy Iovine and Ron Fair, launched an open audition for a separate recording group. After Will.i.am recommended Scherzinger to Iovine, she hoped to obtain a solo deal and auditioned in December 2003 along with Melody Thornton joining Carmit Bachar, Ashley Roberts, Jessica Sutta and Kimberly Wyatt. As the lead singer, Scherzinger assumed the majority of the vocals and is the only member of the group to have songwriting credits on their debut album PCD, which was released in September 2005. The album was preceded by "Don't Cha", which became their international breakthrough, peaking at number two on the Billboard Hot 100. The album spawned other hits, "Stickwitu" and "Buttons", the former of which was nominated for Best Pop Performance by a Duo or Group with Vocals at the 49th Annual Grammy Awards.

In February 2006, Scherzinger signed a global publishing agreement with Universal Music Publishing Group, which would cover her future songwriting. Her work as lead singer furthered Scherzinger's popularity as she continued to work on her own music. Scherzinger's first solo recording was a feature on Avant's "Lie About Us" that was released in July 2006 and later collaborated with Sean Combs on "Come to Me", which became Scherzinger's first solo top-ten hit on the US Billboard Hot 100. In March 2007, Scherzinger announced that her debut studio album would be titled Her Name is Nicole and was initially scheduled for a release in late summer. Four singles were released from the project—"Whatever U Like" featuring T.I., "Baby Love" featuring will.i.am, "Supervillain", and "Puakenikeni"—however, all failed to make any significant impact on the Billboard charts, although "Baby Love" was a moderate success in international territories. After a number of push backs, Scherzinger decided not to release any further singles from the album and, at her request, Her Name Is Nicole was eventually shelved and shifted back her focus on the Doll's second album.

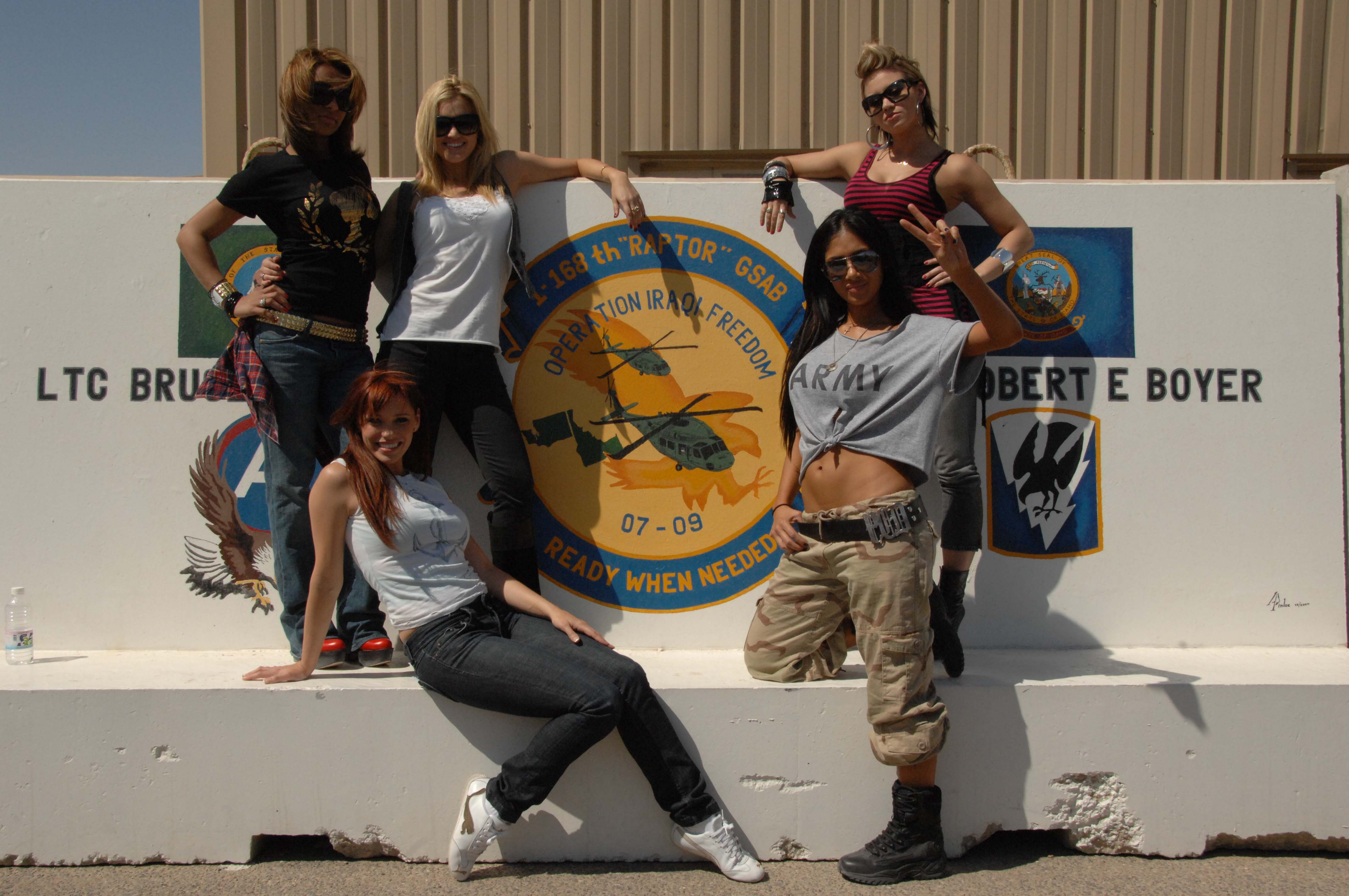
The Pussycat Dolls performed for more than 2,000 U.S. and coalition service members during a live concert March 10, 2008, at a U.S. Army camp in the Persian Gulf Region (2008).

The Pussycat Dolls' second and final album, Doll Domination, was released in the United States on September 23, 2008, and peaked at number four on the Billboard 200. The album included the singles "When I Grow Up" and "I Hate This Part", which peaked at number nine and eleven on the Billboard Hot 100, respectively. Both songs were originally recorded for Scherzinger's solo effort. The following year, the group embarked on the worldwide Doll Domination Tour, which began on January 18, 2009. While on tour, Scherzinger was asked to re-write the pop version of "Jai Ho" from the film Slumdog Millionaire (2008). The song was titled "Jai Ho! (You Are My Destiny)" crediting A. R. Rahman and the Pussycat Dolls, while Scherzinger was credited as a featured artist causing dissatisfaction within the group. The song reached number one in 17 countries; in the US, it peaked at number fifteen on the Billboard Hot 100, after rising eighty-five places consequently making the largest weekly leap from number 100. On April 5, 2009, Scherzinger performed "America the Beautiful" at Wrestlemania XXV, at the Reliant Stadium in Houston, Texas. After the tour concluded in August 2009, the group announced a hiatus to further pursue solo careers. In December 2009, Scherzinger was announced as the third judge joining Ben Folds and Boyz II Men band member Shawn Stockman on the first season of The Sing-Off. She returned for the second season before being replaced by Sara Bareilles.

=== 2010–2012: The X Factor and Killer Love ===
In May 2010, Scherzinger and her dance partner Derek Hough won the tenth season of Dancing with the Stars. In July 2010, Scherzinger served as a guest judge only for Dannii Minogue on The X Factor UK during the auditions and the bootcamp, where she formed One Direction, by picking up the boys and insisting with other judges that the boys together would have been a smash. Her stint was "well-received by viewers and producers". The following month, she portrayed Maureen in Neil Patrick Harris' Hollywood Bowl production of the rock musical Rent. Her performance in the musical received praise from critics, Charles McNulty of the Los Angeles Times wrote, "Scherzinger's powerhouse voice was meant for venues like the Bowl." In October 2010, Scherzinger released "Poison" as the lead single from the album, which peaked at number three on the UK Singles Chart, and announced her departure from the Pussycat Dolls to focus on her solo career.

Her debut album, Killer Love, was released on March 21, 2011, in the United Kingdom. On the UK Albums Chart the album debuted and peaked at number eight and by November it sold over 140,000 copies. The album's second single, "Don't Hold Your Breath" became Scherzinger's first number-one single as a solo artist in the UK Singles Chart and its third single "Right There" reached number three. "Right There" was remixed to feature 50 Cent and peaked at number thirty-nine, remaining her highest-charting single on the Billboard Hot 100 as a lead artist. It was released as the lead single for the US version of Killer Love, however after a number of delays, the release was never materialized.

Initially hired to co-host with Steve Jones the first season of the USA show of The X Factor, Scherzinger's eventual replacement of former judge of The X Factor UK, Cheryl Cole amidst the audition stages as a judge caused controversy. She later received backlash and death threats after sending the result to deadlock in the quarter-final, which resulted in Rachel Crow's elimination. She mentored the Over 30s; her final contestant, Josh Krajcik, was named the runner-up of the season. In December 2011, as part of the 25th anniversary of The Phantom of the Opera, Scherzinger performed the song of the same name at the Royal Variety Performance. Meanwhile, Killer Love was re-released with four additional songs, including the fifth and final single, "Try with Me". Scherzinger left The X Factor USA after the conclusion of the first season. She was replaced by Britney Spears for the second season of The X Factor USA.

In February 2012, she embarked on her first headlining tour in the United Kingdom, and later briefly appeared in Barry Sonnenfeld's Men in Black 3. On June 15, 2012, she was confirmed as the fourth judge for the ninth series of The X Factor UK to replace Kelly Rowland for a reported salary of $1.17 million. Scherzinger mentored the Boys category and selected James Arthur, Rylan Clark-Neal, and Jahmene Douglas to compete in the live shows. Scherzinger made history and a hugely successful judge on the UK show by becoming the only judge to have all three of her contestants in the quarter-final and the second judge to have her remaining two remaining contestants as the final two, with Arthur eventually winning the series. Scherzinger sang "Don't Cry for Me Argentina" at the Andrew Lloyd Webber: 40 Musical Years tribute show.

=== 2013–2018: Big Fat Lie and television ventures ===
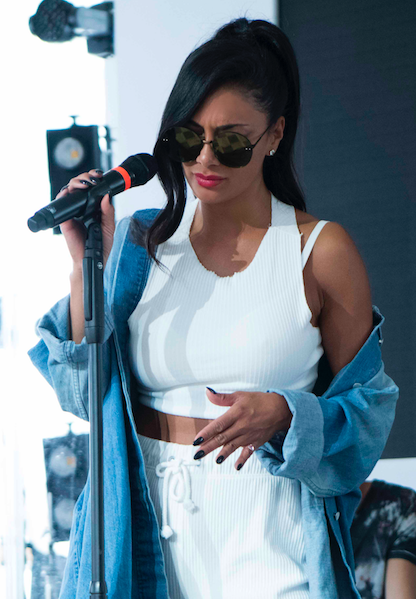
Scherzinger in Moscow at a soundcheck, 2018

In March 2013, Scherzinger released "Boomerang", which debuted and peaked at number six on the UK Singles Chart; after its lackluster success, the associated album was scrapped. Scherzinger returned as judge on The X Factor for its tenth series for a reported salary of $2.3 million. In February 2014, Scherzinger announced that she signed a record deal with Sony Music Entertainment and RCA Records for a reported $4.5 million. Scherzinger's second studio album, Big Fat Lie was released in October 2014. It experienced lackluster sales on the UK Albums Chart, which led to her eventual departure from the label the following year. The album was preceded by the singles "Your Love", "Run" and "On the Rocks". "Your Love" peaked at number six on the UK Singles Chart and was a moderate success on other international markets. In December, Scherzinger made her West End debut starring as Grizabella in the 2014 revival of the musical Cats at the London Palladium where she played the role for a 12-week run until February 8, 2015; her performance received rave reviews from critics particularly praising her rendition of the song standard "Memory" and garnered a Laurence Olivier Award nomination for Best Actress in a Supporting Role in a Musical. She was set to reprise Grizabella in the Broadway revival of Cats but a week before rehearsals she quit after producers refused to give her top billing.

On June 30, 2015, Scherzinger was crowned as the winner of the variety show I Can Do That where six celebrities compete with each other by performing skills that they never knew they had. In July she performed the American national anthem at the A Capitol Fourth concert in Washington, D.C. and during the opening of the 2015 Special Olympics World Summer Games. Best Time Ever with Neil Patrick Harris, a live variety show premiered on September 15, 2015, on NBC with Scherzinger as co-host; the show was cancelled after one season due to low ratings. The following month, the music panel show hosted by Ricky Wilson, Bring the Noise premiered on Sky 1 with Scherzinger and Tinie Tempah joining him as team captains. After a 3-year hiatus from The X Factor UK, Scherzinger returned as a judge for the thirteenth and fourteenth series, replacing Rita Ora. She left before the fifteenth series, where she was replaced by Louis Tomlinson. She voiced Sina in the animated feature Moana, which was released in November 2016 through Walt Disney Pictures. Scherzinger starred as Penny in ABC's television film Dirty Dancing, a remake of the 1987 film of the same name. It premiered on May 24, 2017. Although the movie received negative reviews from critics, Scherzinger's performance received praise. In September 2017, she launched her debut fragrance, Chosen by Nicole Scherzinger. In 2018, Scherzinger had a voice cameo in Ralph Breaks the Internet.

=== 2019–2022: The Masked Singer, Pussycat Dolls reunion and solo comeback ===
Scherzinger began 2019 with appearing as a panelist on The Masked Singer; a reality singing competition where celebrities sing covers of famous songs while wearing costumes that conceal their identities. The program's premiere was the highest-rated unscripted television series debut in the United States since The X Factor USA in 2011, and has since been a ratings success for the network. In May 2019, Scherzinger was announced as a judge to replace Sophie Monk on the ninth season of Australia's Got Talent. Between October and December 2019, she appeared as judge on The X Factor spin-off's Celebrity and The Band. On the finale of The X Factor: Celebrity, the Pussycat Dolls, consisting of Sutta, Bachar, Roberts, Scherzinger, and Wyatt, reunited with a live medley performance of their previous singles and their new song, "React". British media regulator Ofcom received over 400 complaints from viewers who criticized the band's perceived provocative nature of their performance.

The third season of The Masked Singer premiered in February 2020 as the Super Bowl LIV lead-out program and was viewed by over 27.3 million people—the series' most watched episode. The Pussycat Dolls' "React" was released in the same month, to moderate success. Scherzinger voiced Miranda Trese on Netflix original anime series, Trese, which premiered on June 10, 2021. Scherzinger played the role of Grace Farrell on NBC's musical television special Annie Live! that aired on December 2, 2021.

The Pussycat Dolls reunion tour was put on hold after Scherzinger was sued by the group's founder Robin Antin. It was officially canceled in January 2022, with reasons cited as logistical difficulties due to the COVID-19 pandemic and business issues between Scherzinger and Antin. Shortly after in April that same year, Scherzinger held a three-night musical showcase at The Sun Rose, Hollywood. During the event, Scherzinger sang a number of musical theatre productions, as well as announcing a return to solo music. Speaking about the event, Scherzinger said "It was important people get to see me in this intimate setting, to truly hear me, and experience my love and connection of music through singing. … to create a space for me where I can live out my full potential as an artist, without having to be defined by any style or genre of music." She also confirmed the release of a new EP of music, Warrior and debuted one of its songs "Never Going Back". She also confirmed that she remains unsigned at the time of writing.

On June 17, 2022, and according to Belfast news outlet The Newsletter, it was revealed Scherzinger is set to debut an interior design range including bedding under the name 'Nalu'. The venture is licensed through Bedeck, a manufacturer who have produced similar ranges with Ted Baker and DKNY. Northern Irish design agency Anthology were also involved in the project. The same day, it was also reported that Scherzinger would be releasing a new single "The Drop", a collaboration with French DJ David Guetta in the week commencing June 20, 2022. Said single is a collaboration between Scherzinger, Guetta and Dimitri Vegas, while also featuring Azteck. It was released on June 24, 2022.

=== 2023–present: Sunset Boulevard ===
Scherzinger performing on the PCD Forever Tour in September 2026

In May 2023, Scherzinger performed at the Coronation Concert held at Windsor Castle in celebration of the coronation of Charles III, where she performed "Reflection" from Mulan, accompanied by Chinese pianist Lang Lang. She later appeared in Yoshiki's documentary film Yoshiki: Under the Sky, released in December 2023, performing "I'll Be Your Love".

Scherzinger returned to the West End as Norma Desmond, a silent-film star who dreams of restoring her film career, in the revival of Sunset Boulevard, directed by Jamie Lloyd. The production opened at the Savoy Theatre ran for 16 weeks. She initially hesitated at Lloyd's offer to play Norma Desmond, questioning whether she was suited to the role, but ultimately embraced its exploration of ageism in the entertainment industry. The production was transferred to Broadway's St. James Theatre in 2024, beginning previews on September 28 and marking her Broadway debut. It concluded on July 20, 2025, following an extension due to high demand. Her performance garnered critical acclaim; Matt Wolf of The New York Times hailed her performance as "career-defining" writing, "[she] finds a predatory allure in the character that is both captivating and chilling." Her performance earned her the Laurence Olivier Award and Tony Award for Best Actress in a Musical, as well as the Drama League Award for Distinguished Performance.

In July 2025, Scherzinger served as a judge and mentor on the Netflix reality competition series Building the Band. In October, she performed a three-date concert series, An Evening with Nicole Scherzinger, which included her Carnegie Hall debut. The Royal Albert Hall was recorded for limited one-weekend theatrical release in April 2026 through AMC Theatres, before later airing on PBS as part of Great Performances. In November, she ended her legal dispute with Antin through a confidential settlement.

In March 2026, Scherzinger reunited with Roberts and Wyatt as a trio for the PCD Forever Tour, a world tour that began in June 2026. She will next appear in Rebel Wilson's musical comedy Girl Group, before starring in an independent film.

In September 2026, Scherzinger suffered a severe burn as a result of boiling water falling on her leg. As of the time of writing though, she has expressed an intention and ability to carry on with the tour.

== Artistry ==
=== Influences ===
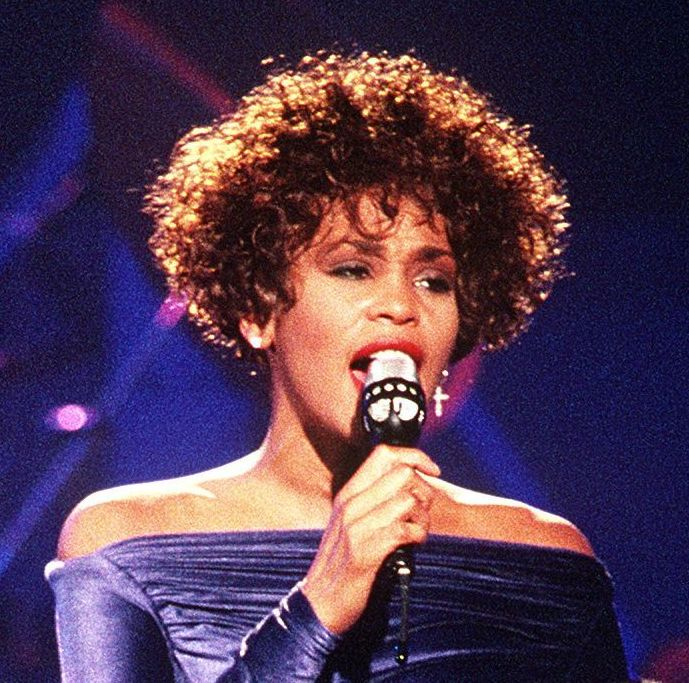
Scherzinger has cited Whitney Houston (pictured) as her idol and biggest influence.

Scherzinger has named Whitney Houston as her idol and biggest influence. She said that she wanted to be "Whitney Houston growing up" and praised the singer's vocal abilities and stage presence. She noted, "no one can sing [her songs] like her. She had such a powerful energy about her that when she sang it was like she had wings — she filled the universe with her voice. Hers was a divine gift and it happened to come in the most beautiful package." She revealed, Houston's "The Greatest Love of All" was the song that made her want to do music. As she grew older she also listened to artists such as Ella Fitzgerald, Billie Holiday, Roberta Flack, Sade, Alanis Morissette, and Tina Turner. She has also stated that Andrew Lloyd Webber's music has been influential to her as an artist as she grew up listening to musicals such as Jesus Christ Superstar, Joseph and the Amazing Technicolor Dreamcoat, Evita. Following the death of Prince in late of April 2016, Scherzinger posted a lengthy tribute citing him as a "mentor" and "inspiration" to her career. While on stage Scherzinger borrows personas of Tina Turner and Mick Jagger; "the way he prances around stage and the poise he has on stage. But I love [Turner's] attitude and sass. I steal from her all the time, especially being the lead singer of this group, the Pussycat Dolls, to be fearless and just have that attitude and that soul behind you."

She cited Janet Jackson's sixth studio album, The Velvet Rope (1997), as her main inspiration for her second album, Big Fat Lie (2014), while the music video for "Your Love" was inspired by Jackson's "Love Will Never Do (Without You)" (1989) clip. During the recording process, she stated that Sam Smith's 2014 album In the Lonely Hour inspired her to get "emotionally raw." Scherzinger has also incorporated her Hawaiian heritage into her music; her single "Puakenikeni" (2007) was named after the flower that was introduced to that state. The music video of the song "Right There" featured Hawaiian and Tahitian fashion and dance moves. Stylistically, Scherzinger draws inspiration from Jennifer Lopez, Sienna Miller, and Gwen Stefani. Inspired by Jennifer Lopez's look, Scherzinger dyed her hair blonde during her twenties to what she described as disastrous results.

=== Musical style and voice ===
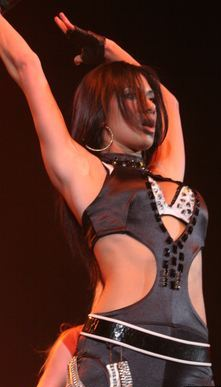
Scherzinger during a performance in 2006

Scherzinger possesses a soprano range. Scherzinger's vocal abilities have received contrasting opinions; Adam White of The Daily Telegraph considers her as "an incredible vocalist" but notes that her voice is not distinct. Her vocal performance on Killer Love (2011) received similar reviews from music critics. Michael Cragg of The Observer wrote, "Scherzinger's not inconsiderable voice is used as a blank canvas" with producers projecting suggestions from other artists. Stephen Thomas Erlewine from Allmusic wrote that she "sings with the finesse of a demo singer, serving the needs of the song without betraying a hint of personality". Caroline Sullivan of The Guardian described her vocal performance as "powerful and true", though notes it's "more evident live than on record". Andrew Lloyd Webber praised Scherzinger's recording of "Memory", calling it the "best recording of anything of [his] music ever done".

Scherzinger has called herself a perfectionist when it comes to her releasing music claiming she had decided to shelve five albums, most notably, Her Name Is Nicole. While recording for the album Scherzinger incorporated pop, R&B, hip hop, and rock genres. Her intent was to differentiate herself from her role as the lead vocalist of the Pussycat Dolls and establish herself as a solo artist. Her debut album, Killer Love skewed towards Europop and explored new genres such as, dance and electronic. The album consists two-thirds of up-tempo songs and one-third ballads. In Big Fat Lie Scherzinger returned to "various pop and dance tropes familiar from the past decade or so of American pop." The themes of the album revolve around fame, love, sex, relationship issues, and addresses her struggles with bulimia.

Scherzinger selects to record songs that would lend themselves to being performed live. Her stage presence has been praised. While reviewing Scherzinger's tour Sullivan of The Guardian wrote that she is "able to out-dance her four dancers." Rolling Stone magazine readers voted Scherzinger as their ninth Favorite Dancing Musician. Described as being "provocative" when performing on stage, Scherzinger states that her stage persona "comes from a strong place, not a weak place, and there's a big difference. There's a big difference when you see someone who still has class and is empowering."

== Public image ==
Scherzinger is best known as the lead singer of the Pussycat Dolls and is credited with leading the group into becoming one of the world's best-selling girl groups of all time, selling over 55 million records worldwide. Her leadership role was met with criticism from critics and her fellow members. Despite being the only member who achieved mainstream recognition, Scherzinger has struggled to develop a successful solo career, specifically in her native country. According to Billboard, the cancellation of Her Name Is Nicole in 2007 hampered Scherzinger's solo career, while both of her albums—Killer Love (2011) and Big Fat Lie (2014)—were released in territories except the United States. Music critic Stephen Thomas Erlewine characterized Scherzinger as "the least distinctive diva of the new millennium."

Writing for The Daily Telegraph, Adam White has described Scherzinger's career as "a perfect case study in all the right ingredients not automatically producing a great result; ... she's never taken off as a pop star in her own right, instead achieving greater visibility and success as a reality TV judge and spokesperson for products." Nick Duerden of The Independent described Scherzinger as the "ultimate modern celebrity" thanks to her work with the Pussycat Dolls, her television ventures and her publicized personal life. He opined that despite her possessing natural talents, she doesn't have "Lady Gaga's edge, Katy Perry's chutzpah nor Rihanna's élan" adding her "drive, passion, [and] unstinting commitment to succeed" is what sets her apart from other singers.

Scherzinger has developed an image as a sex symbol and "one of the hottest women on the planet." Since 2006 she has been featured on FHM's "100 Sexiest Women" list peaking at number nine in 2011 and 2014. In 2012, VH1 ranked her eighth on their list of "100 Sexiest Artists", while Complex magazine ranked her twenty-ninth on their list of "The 100 Hottest Female Singers of All Time".

== Personal life ==
In late 2012, Scherzinger spoke of her experiences with bulimia at the height of the popularity of the Pussycat Dolls. Her struggling with body dysmorphia before an early photo shoot with the group triggered her bulimic behavior, which lasted nearly a decade. She eventually overcame the disorder through therapists and life coaches.

=== Relationships ===
Scherzinger considers herself shy. She keeps her personal life to herself, and declines to answer questions in interviews that pertain to her relationships. When asked, she states, "My music is the only place I'm open about it." She was engaged to Nick Hexum, lead singer of 311, whom she dated from 2000 to 2004. Scherzinger commenced a high-profile relationship with 7-time Formula 1 World Champion Lewis Hamilton, after meeting at the 2007 MTV Europe Music Awards in Munich. Their on-and-off relationship of seven years was a tabloid fixture in the British press. They separated for the final time in February 2015. In 2016, she started a romantic relationship with Bulgarian tennis player Grigor Dimitrov that ended in early 2019. In January 2020, Scherzinger confirmed her relationship with former Scottish rugby player Thom Evans. On June 27, 2023, it was confirmed that they were engaged.

=== Politics ===
Scherzinger endorsed Barack Obama's 2008 presidential campaign; she appeared in the music video for will.i.am's song "Yes We Can" (2008), which was inspired by Obama's speech after the 2008 New Hampshire primary. She has taken a public stance against abortion, and avoids identifying as a feminist. She says instead, "I'm just for women. I'm also for the human race in general." She is a supporter of LGBTQ rights and in 2017, through Billboard, Scherzinger published a "love letter" to the LGBTQ community in which she praised the community for "standing strong against adversity and [for being] a community that unites for change."

On the day of the election of Donald Trump in November 2024, the comedian and Trump supporter Russell Brand posted a photo of himself on Instagram in which he waved a Trump-style red cap adorned with the slogan "Make Jesus First Again." Scherzinger sparked controversy when she replied to Brand's post with the comment "Where do I get this hat!!!?" followed by a prayer-hands emoji and a red heart emoji. Following a backlash on social media, Scherzinger deleted her comment, and posted an apology to her fans implying that she had never intended for the comment to reflect her political views/who she voted for, but rather as a reflection of her commitment to faith, consistent with the words on the hat.

== Philanthropy ==
Following the 2010 Haiti earthquake, along with various other artists, she was featured on the charity single "We Are the World 25 for Haiti", and participated in George Clooney's and Wyclef Jean's Hope for Haiti Now: A Global Benefit for Earthquake Relief telethon that benefited people affected by the tragedy. In October 2010, she portrayed Trixie at the 35th anniversary concert of The Rocky Horror Picture Show that raised money for the Painted Turtle, a Hole in the Wall Foundation camp for kids with serious medical conditions. Inspired by her aunt who has Down syndrome, she became a global ambassador for the Special Olympics and recorded "O Holy Night" for A Very Special Christmas (2013) with all proceeds benefiting the organization. Since 2014 Scherzinger is a UNICEF UK supporter and has traveled to Guyana, Manila, Philippines, and Kenya, where she visited the organization's supported centers benefiting children in poverty. She later performed "Brave" with the SU2C choir for Stand Up 2 Cancer to raise money for cancer research on October 17, 2014.

Scherzinger along with numerous other artists were featured on the single "Love Song to the Earth", which was released in September 2015 ahead of the 2015 United Nations Climate Change Conference, as part of the global campaign to raise awareness on climate change. In September 2016, Scherzinger along with numerous other artists were featured on the remake of the Black Eyed Peas song "Where Is the Love?" where all proceeds went towards will.i.am's non-profit foundation, i.am.angel Foundation. In August 2019, she took part in the protests against the building of the Thirty Meter Telescope on Mauna Kea; a place considered a holy spiritual site for Native Hawaiians.

== Other ventures ==
=== Fashion ===
In April 2010, Scherzinger teamed up with clothing store C&A to launch her own collection of lingerie, shoes, handbags and jewelry in Brazilian stores. A collaboration with online fashion retailer Missguided was released in March 2014, where she designed a 30-piece range. Their collaboration helped the retailer increase profit by 70%.

=== Endorsements ===
In cooperation with Unilever, Scherzinger recorded Duran Duran's "Rio" (1982). In December 2011, Scherzinger began endorsing the imPress Nails manicure line and has her own signature series. From 2012 to 2014, Scherzinger was the ambassador for Herbal Essences. In March 2013, she was announced as an ambassador for British Airways promoting first class routes to Moscow. In April 2013, it was announced that Scherzinger will be the face of Müller Corner, a range of luxury yogurts and front TV and print campaigns. In September 2014, Scherzinger joined Proactiv+ as the new celebrity ambassador for the skin care company.

On November 29, 2016, Scherzinger was announced as the new face of Perfectil, a vitamin product. She featured in a television commercial for Vitabiotics's new Perfectil advertising campaign in March 2017.

On March 2, 2023, it was announced that Scherzinger would be the first non-British godmother for P&O Cruises and that she would be the godmother for Arvia which was to be christened on March 16, 2023.

== Discography ==
- Killer Love (2011)
- Big Fat Lie (2014)

== Stage and screen credits ==
Film

- Men in Black 3 (2012)
- Moana (2016)
- Moana 2 (2024)
- Girl Group (2026)

Stage

- Rent (2010)
- Cats (2014–2015)
- Sunset Boulevard (2023–2025)

== Tours ==
- Nicole Scherzinger 2012 (2012)
- An Evening with Nicole Scherzinger (2025)

== See also ==
- List of artists who reached number one on the UK Singles Chart
- List of people from the Louisville metropolitan area

== Notes ==
Awards and achievements
Preceded by Donny Osmond and Kym Johnson	Dancing with the Stars (US) winners Season 10 (Spring 2010 with Derek Hough)	Succeeded by Jennifer Grey and Derek Hough
