= Avant discography =

- Studio albums: 9
- Singles: 24

This is the discography documenting albums and singles released by American R&B singer Avant.

== Studio albums ==
List of studio albums, with selected chart positions, sales, and certifications
Title	Album details	Peak chart positions		Sales	Certifications
Title	Album details	US	US R&B	Sales	Certifications
My Thoughts	Released: May 9, 2000; Label: MCA; Formats: CD, cassette	45	6	US: 1,100,000 (Note: United States sales figures for My Thoughts as of October 2009.)	RIAA: Platinum
Ecstasy	Released: March 26, 2002; Label: MCA; Formats: CD, cassette	6	2	US: 713,000 (Note: United States sales figures for Ecstasy as of November 2003.)	RIAA: Gold
Private Room	Released: December 9, 2003; Label: Geffen; Formats: LP, CD, cassette	18	4		RIAA: Gold
Director	Released: April 25, 2006; Label: Geffen; Formats: LP, CD, cassette	4	1		
Avant	Released: December 9, 2008; Label: Capitol; Formats: CD, digital download	26	6	US: 162,000 (Note: United States sales figures for Avant as of October 2009.)	
The Letter	Released: December 21, 2010; Label: Verve Forecast; Formats: CD, cassette	114	19		
Face the Music	Released: February 5, 2013; Label: Mo-B; Formats: CD, cassette	40	9		
The VIII	Released: September 25, 2015; Label: Mo-B; Formats: CD, digital download	95	8		
Can We Fall in Love	Released: July 10, 2020; Label: SoNo/Mo-B; Formats: CD, digital download, streaming	—	—		

== Singles ==
List of singles, with selected chart positions, showing year released as single and album name
Title	Year	Peak chart positions				Album
Title	Year	US	US R&B	UK	UK R&B	Album
"Separated"	2000	23	1	—	—	My Thoughts
"My First Love" (featuring Keke Wyatt)	2000	26	4	—	—	My Thoughts
"This Time"	2001	—	—	—	—	My Thoughts
"Makin' Good Love"	2002	27	7	—	—	Ecstasy
"Don't Say No, Just Say Yes"	2002	96	51	—	—	Ecstasy
"You Ain't Right"	2002	—	—	—	—	Ecstasy
"Read Your Mind"	2003	13	5	—	—	Private Room
"Don't Take Your Love Away"	2004	37	13	—	—	Private Room
"Can't Wait"	2004	—	55	—	—	Shark Tale
"Wanna Be Close"	2004	—	—	—	—	Private Room
"You Know What" (featuring Lil Wayne)	2006	—	58	—	—	Director
"4 Minutes"	2006	57	9	—	—	Director
"Lie About Us" (featuring Nicole Scherzinger)	2006	—	— (Note: "Lie About Us" did not enter the Billboard Hot R&B/Hip-Hop Songs, but peaked at number one on the Bubbling Under R&B/Hip-Hop Singles.)	76	9	Director
"When It Hurts"	2008	91	15	—	—	Avant
"Break Ya Back"	2008	—	—	—	—	Avant
"Material Things"	2009	—	—	—	—	Avant
"Kiss Goodbye"	2010	—	57	—	—	The Letter
"Your Body Is the Business"	2011	—	73	—	—	The Letter
"Graduated"	2011	—	—	—	—	The Letter
"You & I" (featuring Keke Wyatt)	2012	—	46	—	—	Face the Music
"More"	2013	—	—	—	—	Face the Music
"Special"	2015	—	—	—	—	The VIII
"Not Gone Lose"	2019	—	—	—	—	Can We Fall in Love
"Edible"	2020	—	—	—	—	Can We Fall in Love

=== Featured singles ===
- 2001: "Secret Lover" (The Isley Brothers featuring Avant)
- 2001: "Nothing in This World" (Keke Wyatt featuring Avant)
- 2002: "Cleveland Is the City" (Bone Thugs-n-Harmony featuring Avant)
- 2005: "Super Saucy" (Baby Bash featuring Avant)
- 2005: "Stickwitu" (Pussycat Dolls featuring Avant)
- 2005: "Karma" (Lloyd Banks featuring Avant)
- 2005: "Bedroom Boom" (Ying Yang Twins featuring Avant)
- 2006: "Claim My Place" (Diddy featuring Avant)
- 2007: "Phone Sex (Thats What's Up)" (Karma featuring Avant)
- 2010: "Skies Wide Open" (Brian Culbertson featuring Avant)
