= List of songs recorded by Nicole Scherzinger =

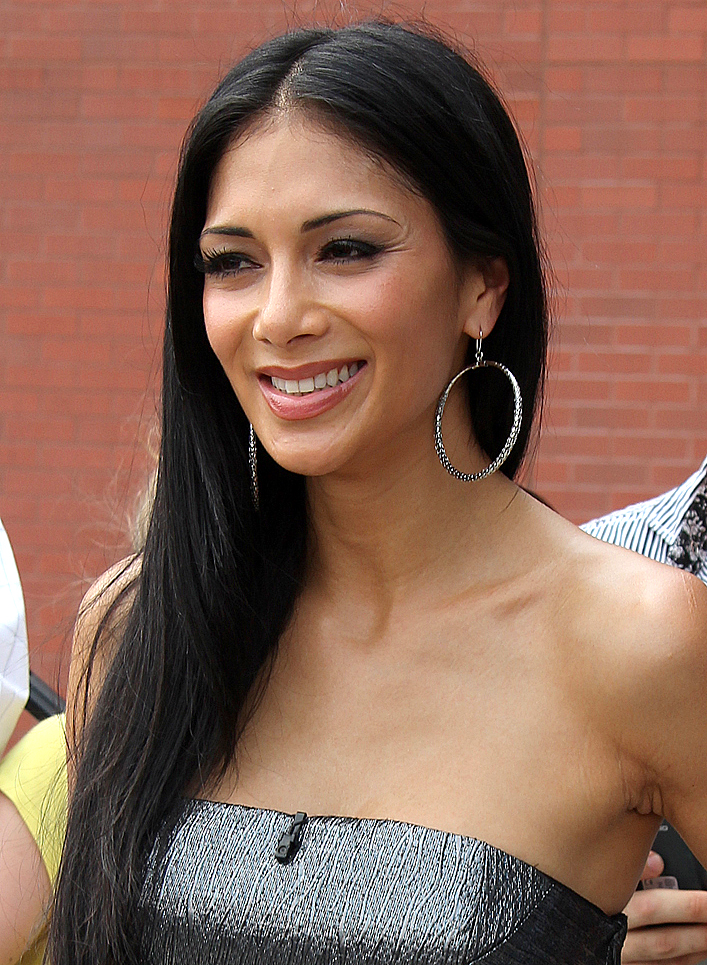
Nicole Scherzinger at The X Factor auditions in New Jersey on June 9, 2012

American singer Nicole Scherzinger has recorded songs for two studio albums and other projects, including collaborations with other artists. She came to prominence in the early 2000s as a member of the girl-group Eden's Crush. Under her Hawaiian name, Nicole Kea, she began distributing demo CDs to different labels in hopes of a solo deal. In 2003 Scherzinger auditioned for and was cast as the lead singer of The Pussycat Dolls, a burlesque troupe turned recording music group.

While recording the group's debut album, PCD (2005), Scherzinger began working on her own solo album titled Her Name Is Nicole, which was due to be released in 2007. Over the course of two years, Scherzinger recorded around 100 songs while working with songwriter-producers Akon, Sean Garrett, Gary Lightbody, Ne-Yo, Polow da Don, T.I., Timbaland and will.i.am. In September 2007 Scherzinger released her debut single, "Baby Love" featuring will.i.am, achieving moderate success. The lack of success of the other three singles: "Whatever U Like", "Supervillain" and "'Puakenikeni", led Scherzinger to cancel her Then Debut Album Titled "Her Name Is Nicole", and focus on the Pussycat Dolls' second studio album. Doll Domination (2008) included songs like "Happily Never After", "I Hate This Part", "When I Grow Up" and "Who's Gonna Love You" which were originally recorded by Scherzinger for her solo effort. In 2009 Scherzinger was asked to re-write and record a pop music version of "Jai Ho", a song from the film Slumdog Millionaire. The new English language version of the song was called "Jai Ho! (You Are My Destiny)", and Scherzinger was credited as a featured artist causing internal strife within and the eventual split of the group.

Following the disbandment of the Pussycat Dolls, Scherzinger once again began working on her debut studio album in 2010. Moroccan producer RedOne, famed for his work with Lady Gaga, worked extensively with Scherzinger, producing and writing half of the album's songs. The album was named Killer Love, after a song of the same name produced by RedOne. Scherzinger would later confirm that it was her decision to not put out the previous incarnation of her debut album, Her Name Is Nicole. Killer Love was released on March 11, 2011, featuring just one of the songs from the Her Name is Nicole recording sessions, Scherizinger's collaboration with Sting, "Power's Out". Scherzinger and RedOne wrote the lead single "Poison", "Killer Love", "Desperate" and "Everybody" while "AmenJena" was co-written with Trina Harmon. Other contributions come from the likes of Jim Jonsin, StarGate, Terius "The-Dream" Nash, Christopher "Tricky" Stewart and Boi-1da. The second single, "Don't Hold Your Breath", was written by Josh Alexander, Billy Steinberg and Toby Gad; it reached number one on the UK Singles Chart and became Scherzinger's highest-charting single in the country, while its third single "Right There" became the singer's highest-charting single on the Billboard Hot 100.

In March 2013, Scherzinger released a new will.i.am-produced single "Boomerang", which was expected to be the lead single from her then untitled second album. New recording sessions resumed with previous collaborators Tricky Stewart and The-Dream in the summer of 2013 and by 2014, Scherzinger had left her long time record label Interscope for a new multi-record deal with RCA Records and Sony Music. Second album Big Fat Lie was released in October 2014 and features the singles "Your Love", "Run", "On the Rocks" and "Bang". The album was written and produced almost entirely by Tricky Stewart and The-Dream, with Scherzinger co-writing the title track, and Justin Tranter and Julia Michaels contributing to "Run". During her career, Scherzinger has also covered songs from various musicals, including "And I Am Telling You" (from Dreamgirls) with Sam Bailey, for Bailey's debut album The Power of Love, "Memory" (from Cats) and "Don't Cry for Me Argentina" (from Evita) amongst others.

== List of songs ==
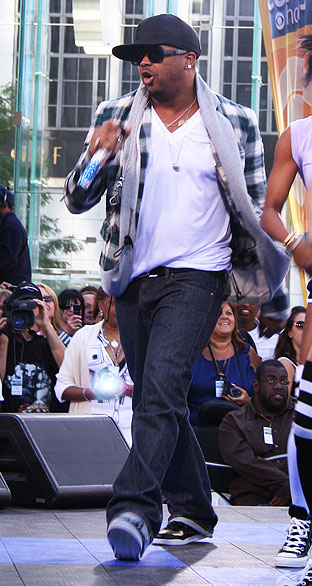
Scherzinger recorded almost all of her second album Big Fat Lie with Terius "The-Dream" Nash.

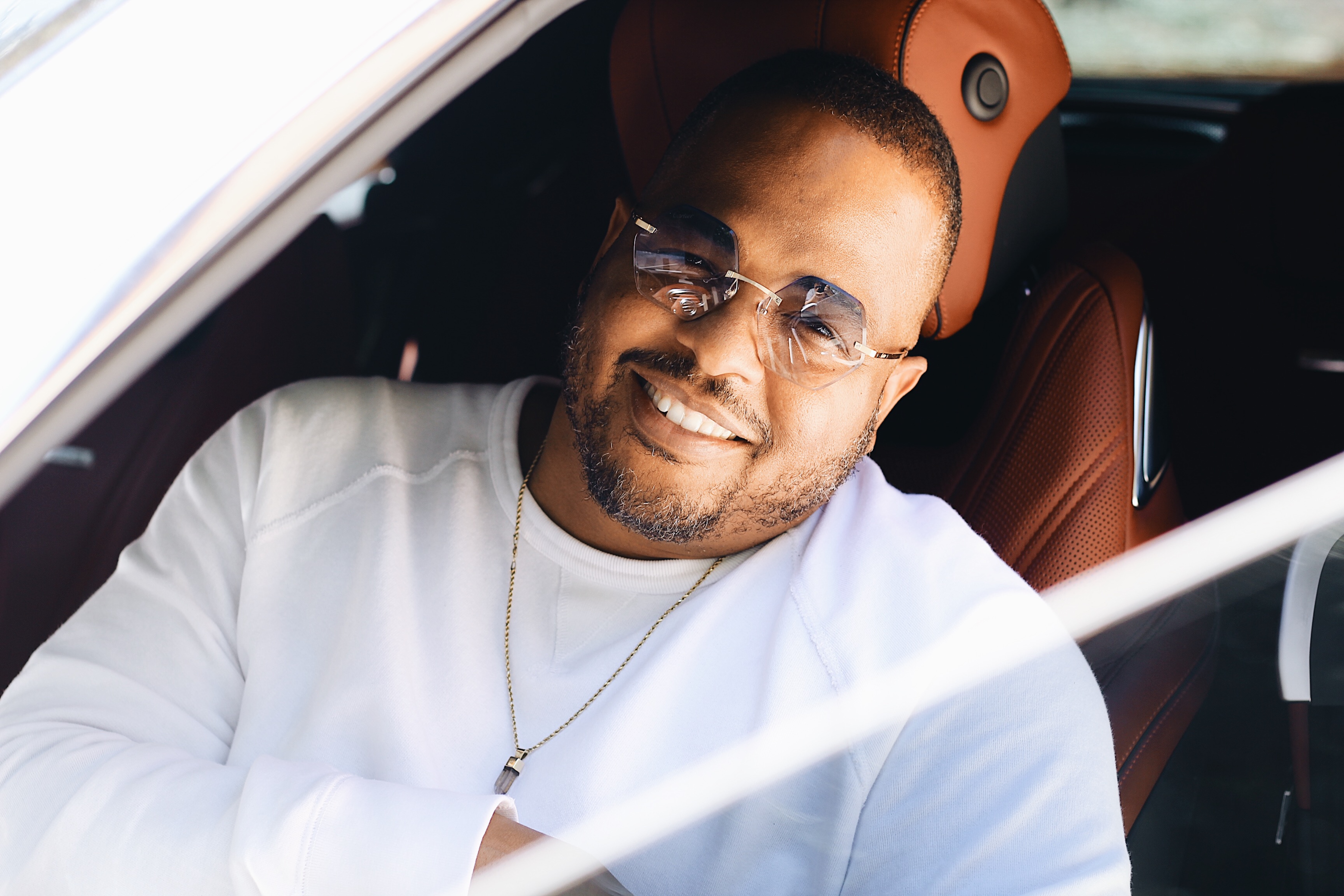
Scherzinger also worked with Christopher "Tricky" Stewart on second album Big Fat Lie.

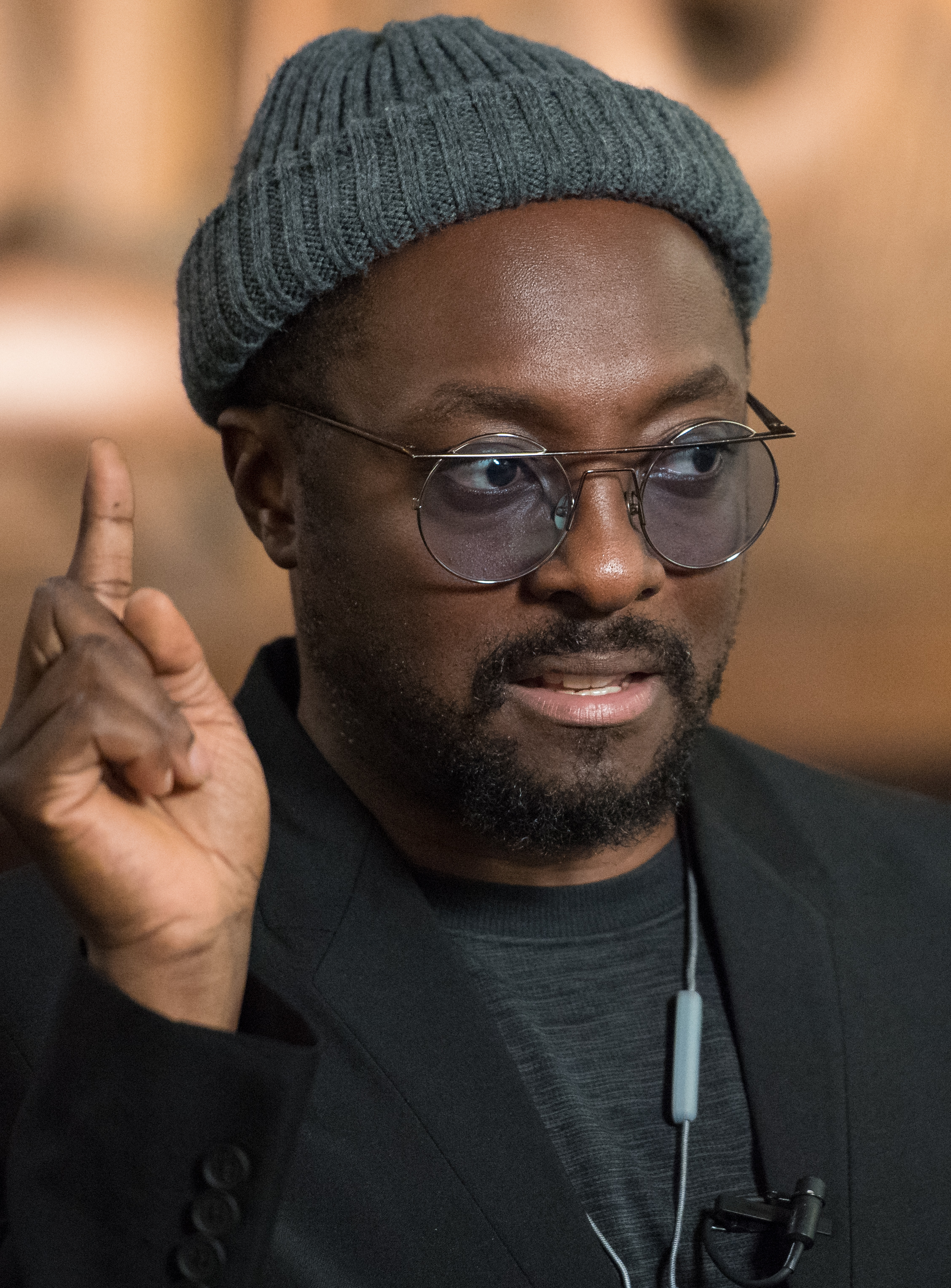
will.i.am featured on and produced Scherzinger's single "Baby Love" as well as collaborating on songs for his 2013 album #willpower.

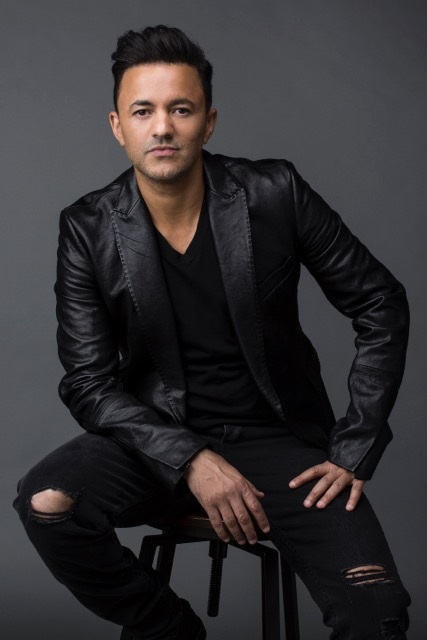
Producer RedOne co-wrote and produced half of Scherzinger's debut album Killer Love, including the set's title track.

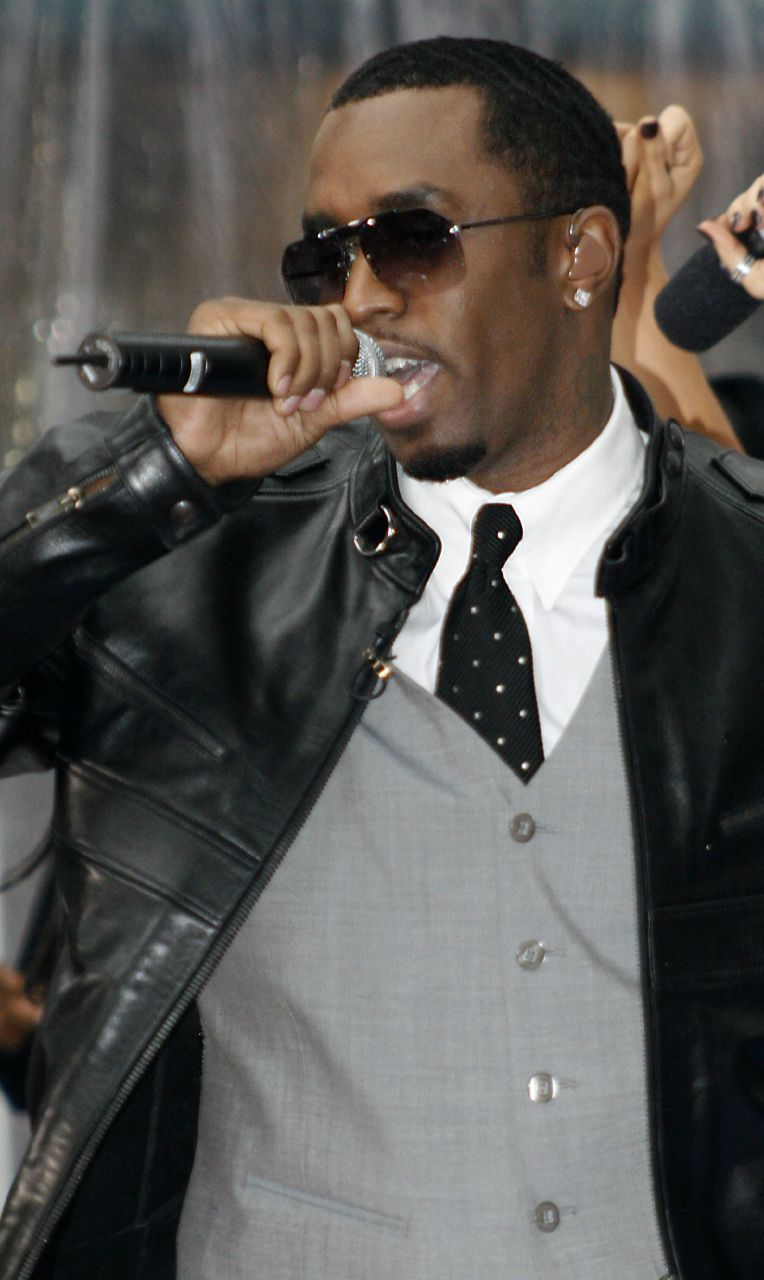
One of Scherzinger's first solo appearances was on Diddy's 2006 single "Come to Me".

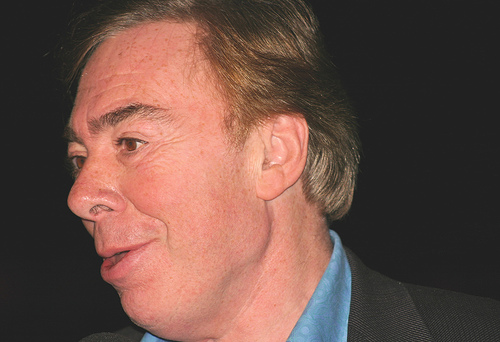
English impresario and theatre writer Andrew Lloyd Webber's work has been recorded by Scherzinger several times including "Memory" and "The Phantom of the Opera".

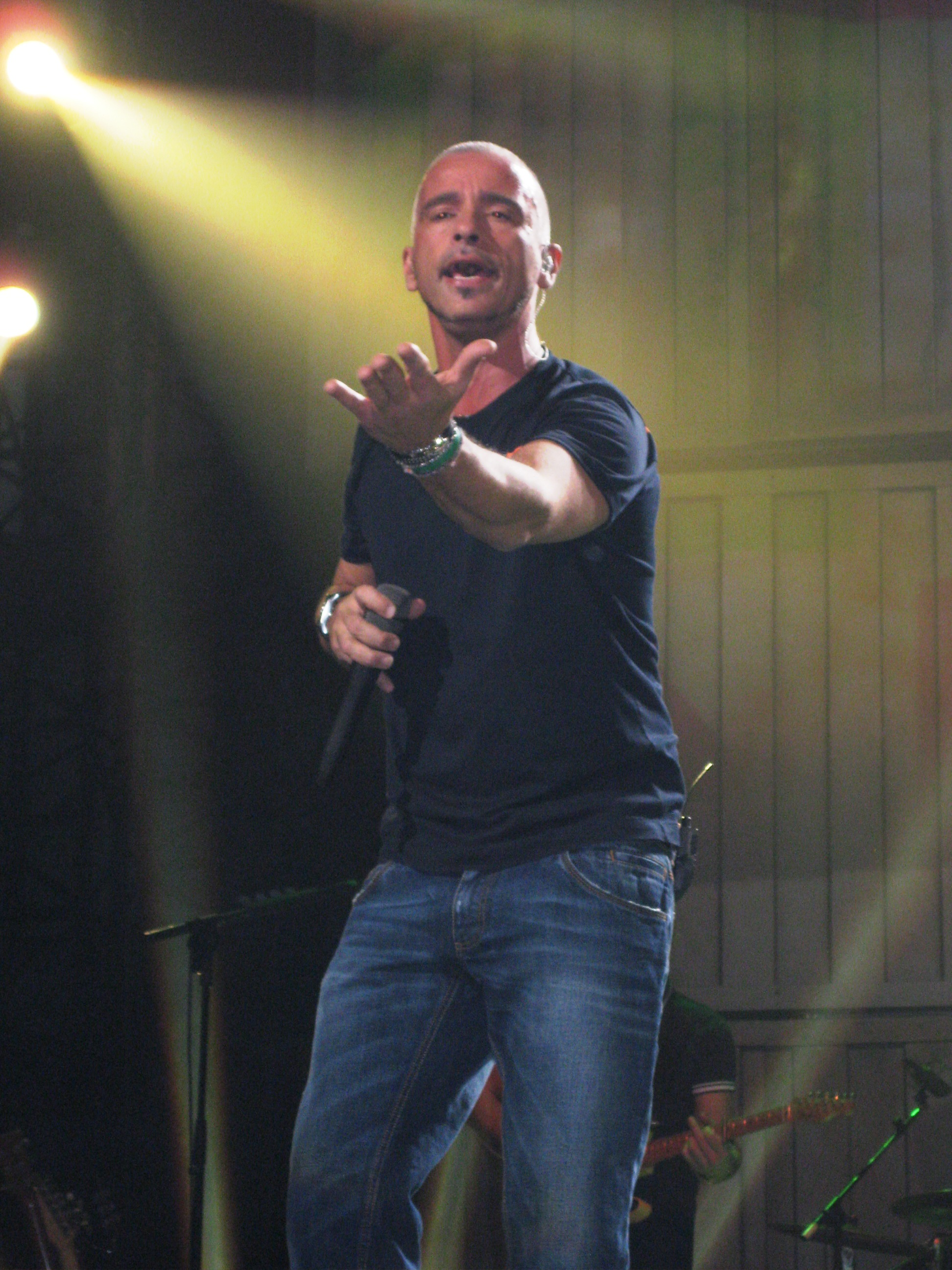
Italian singer-songwriter Eros Ramazzotti collaborated with Scherzinger on his song "Fino all'estasi" and its Spanglish version "Hasta el Éxtasis".

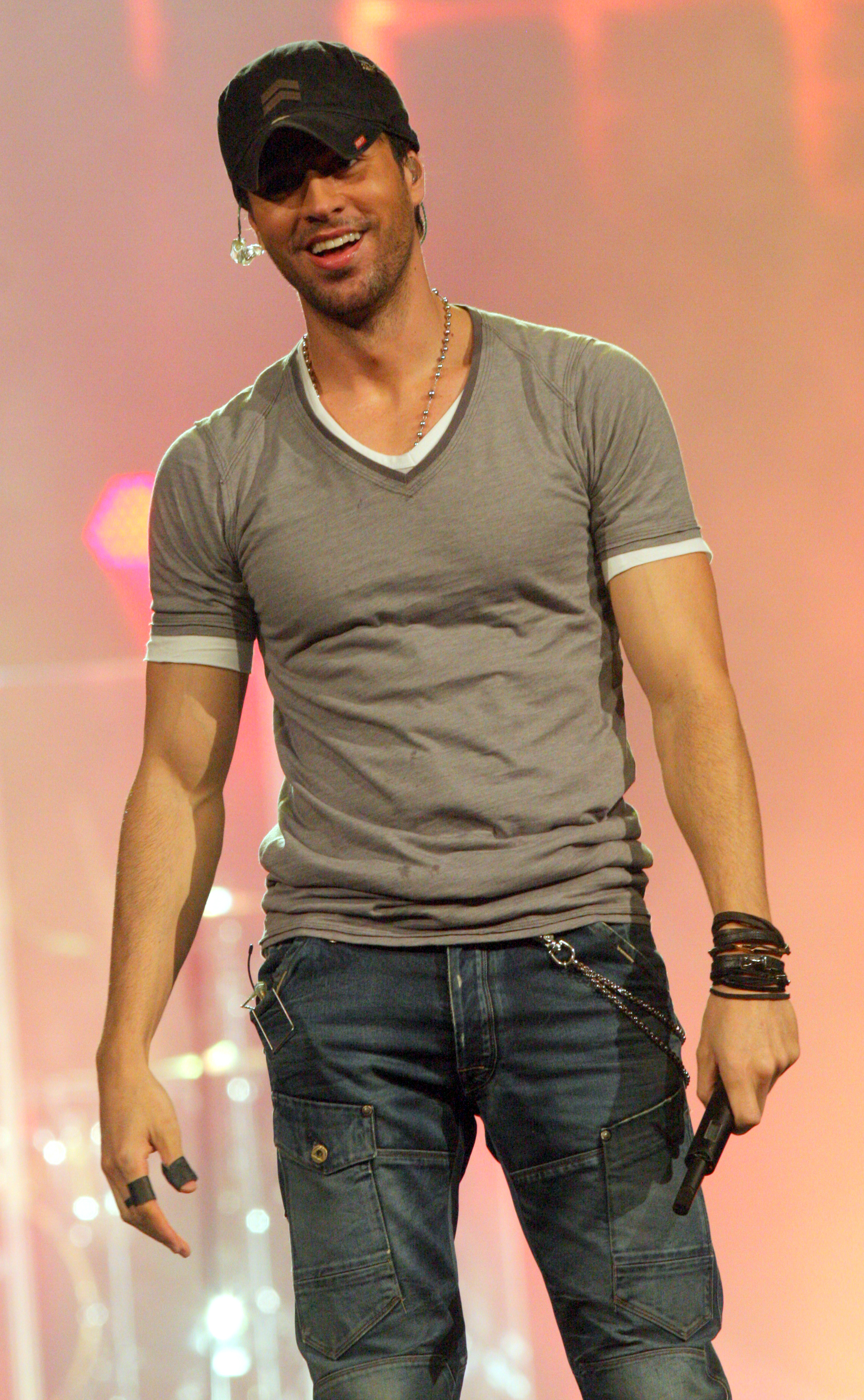
The Rudi Wells remix of Scherzinger and Enrique Iglesias's single "Heartbeat" appears on her debut album Killer Love.

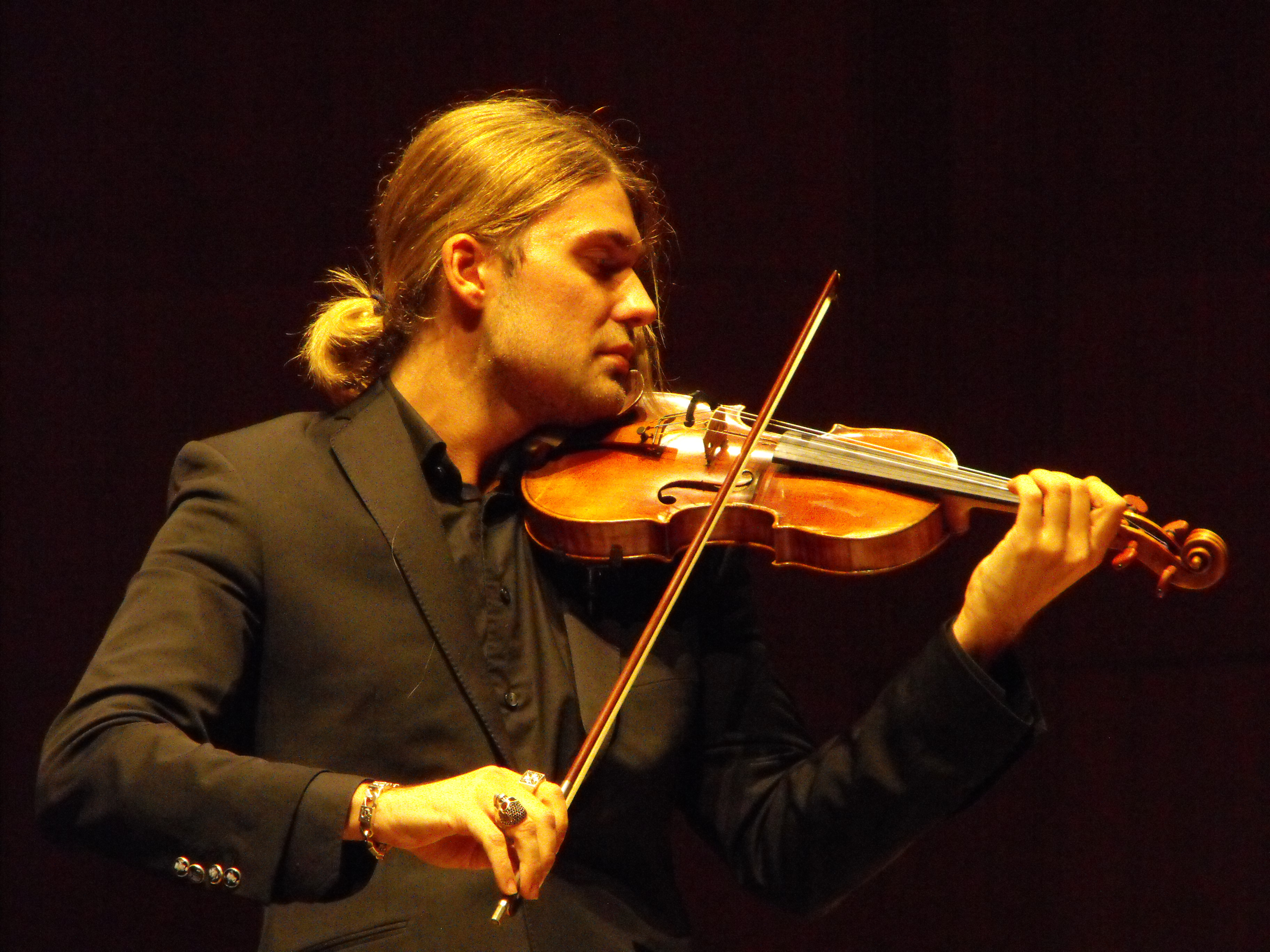
German crossover violinist David Garrett has twice featured Scherzinger on his songs.

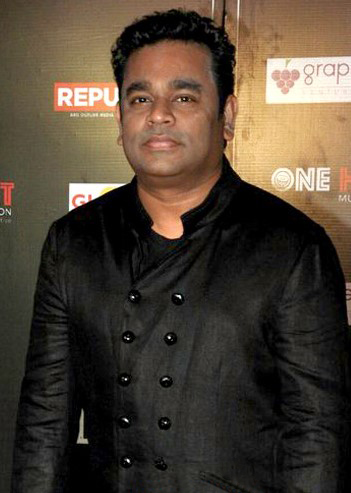
Bollywood composer A.R. Rahman's Grammy Award winning composition "Jai Ho!" was recorded by Scherzinger and the Pussycat Dolls as the single "Jai Ho! (You Are My Destiny)".

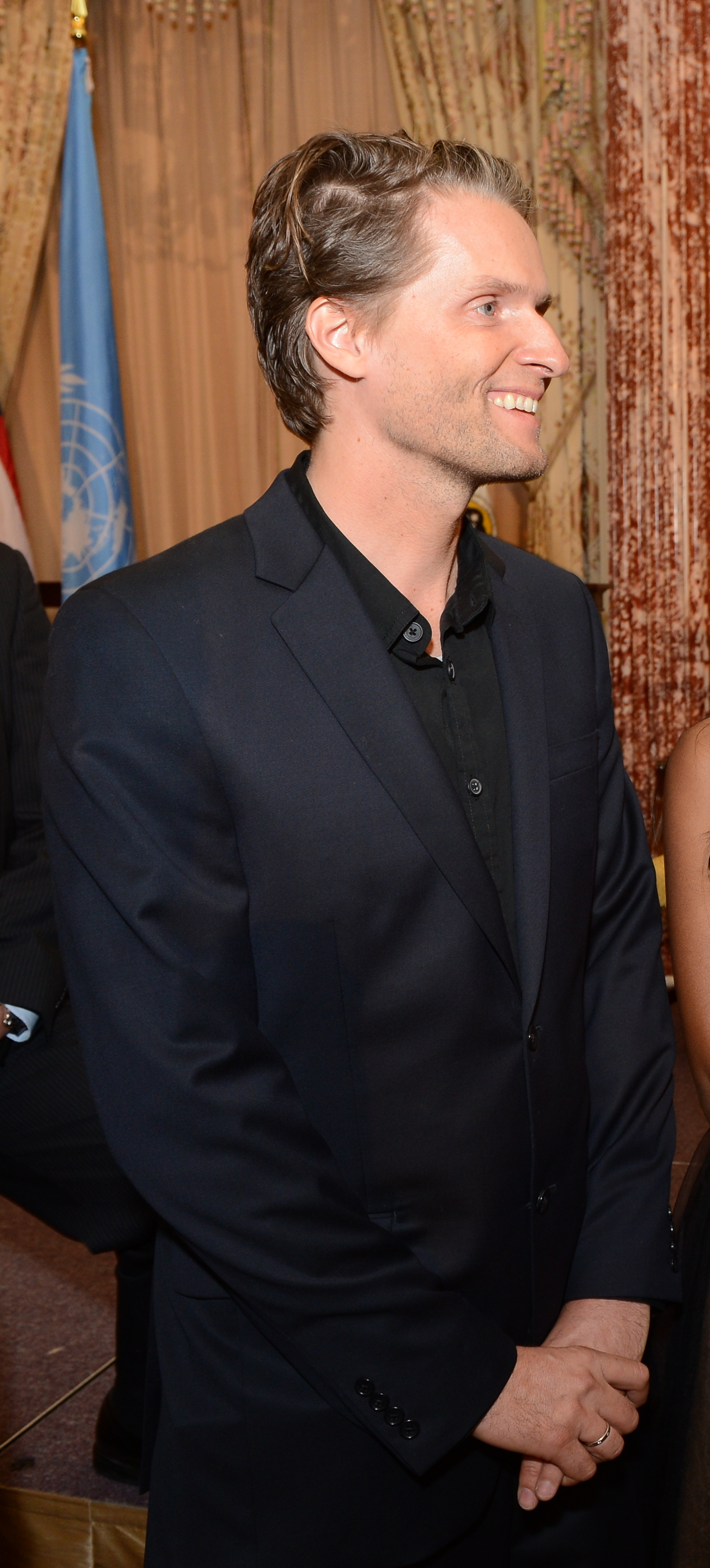
Songwriter and producer Toby Gad helped to co-write "Don't Hold Your Breath", Scherzinger first solo number one single in the UK.

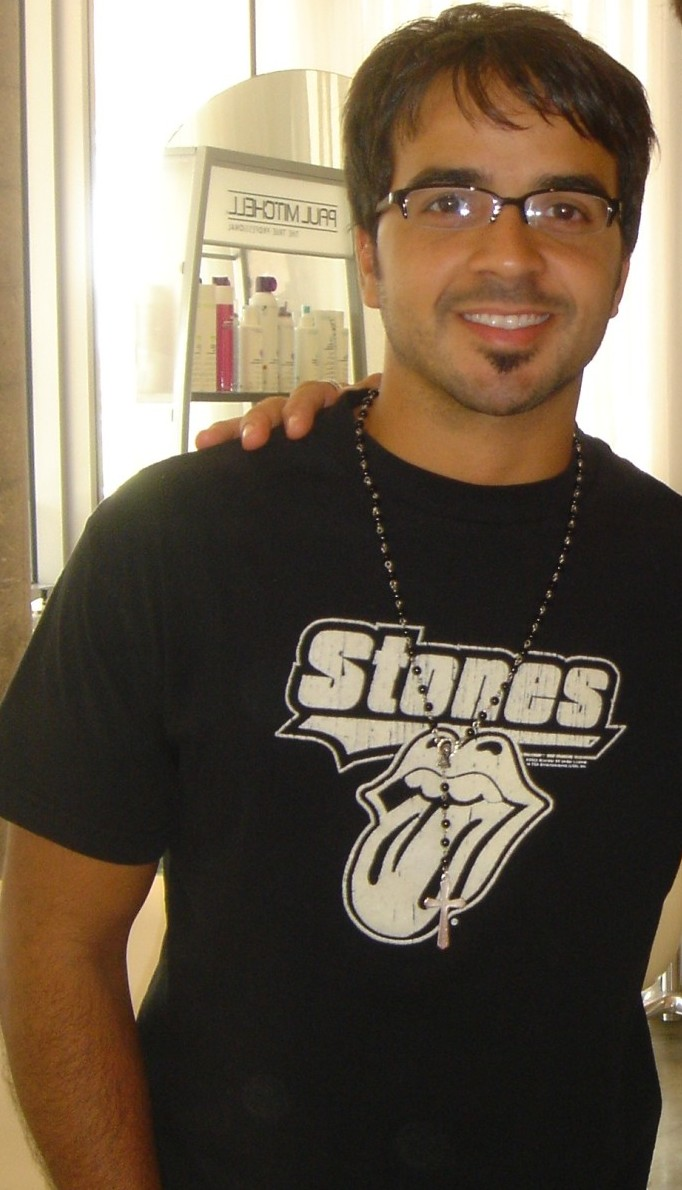
Latin artist Luis Fonsi and Scherzinger collaborated on "She's Bingo" in 2021.

Key
†	Indicates single release
#	Indicates promotional single release

Name of songs, artist, writers, album, and year released.
Song	Artist(s)	Writer(s)	Album	Year	Ref.
"AmenJena"	Nicole Scherzinger	Nicole Scherzinger; Trina Harmon	Killer Love	2011	
"And I Am Telling You"	Sam Bailey & Nicole Scherzinger	Tom Eyen; Henry Krieger	The Power of Love	2014	
"Baby Can't Drive"	Slash featuring Alice Cooper & Nicole Scherzinger	Saul Hudson; Alice Cooper; Nicole Scherzinger	Slash	2010	
"Baby Love" †	Nicole Scherzinger featuring will.i.am	Nicole Scherzinger; William Adams; Kara DioGuardi; Keith Harris	Doll Domination (International deluxe edition) ^{[note 1]}	2007	
"Bang" †	Nicole Scherzinger	Terius Nash; Christopher Stewart	Big Fat Lie	2014	
"Big Fat Lie"	Nicole Scherzinger	Nicole Scherzinger; Terius Nash; Christopher Stewart	Big Fat Lie	2014	
"Boomerang" †	Nicole Scherzinger	Danny Mercer; Morgan Jackson; Anthony Preston; Sandy Wilhelm; Azengo	—N/a	2013	
"Breakfast in Bed"	Nicole Scherzinger	Eddie Hinton; Donnie Fritts	50 First Dates	2004	
"Casualty"	Nicole Scherzinger	Matthew Samuels; Andrea England; Liz Rodrigues; Bret Ryan; Zalezy Epstein	Killer Love	2011	
"Club Banger Nation"	Nicole Scherzinger	RedOne; Bilal "The Chef"; Kinnda "Kee" Hamid	Killer Love	2011	
"Cold World"	Nicole Scherzinger	Justin Tranter; Christopher Stewart	Big Fat Lie	2014	
"Coconut Tree" †	Mohombi featuring Nicole Scherzinger	Mohombi; RedOne; Bilal "The Chef"; AJ Junior; BeatGeek	MoveMeant	2011	
"Come to Me" †	Diddy featuring Nicole Scherzinger	Sean Combs; Mike Winans; Jacoby White; Shay Winans; Nicole Scherzinger; Shannon "Slam" Lawrence; Roger Greene Jr. Richard Frierson; Yakubu Izuagbe	Press Play	2006	
"Desperate"	Nicole Scherzinger	Nicole Scherzinger; RedOne; Kinnda "Kee" Hamid	Killer Love	2011	
"Don't Ask Her That"	Shaggy featuring Nicole Scherzinger	Orville Richard Burrell; Ricardo George Ducent; Scott Storch	Clothes Drop	2005	
"Don't Hold Your Breath" †	Nicole Scherzinger	Josh Alexander; Billy Steinberg; Toby Gad	Killer Love	2011	
"Do You Love Me"	Colt Prattes, Nicole Scherzinger, and J. Quinton Johnson	Berry Gordy	Dirty Dancing: Original Television Soundtrack	2017	
"The Drop" †	with Dimitri Vegas and David Guetta; featuring Azteck	Clementine Douglas; David Guetta; Dimitri Thivaious; Ki Fitzgerald; Paul John Harris; Toby Scott	—N/a	2022	
"Electric Blue"	Nicole Scherzinger featuring T.I.	Terius Nash; Christopher Stewart; Clifford Harris, Jr.	Big Fat Lie	2014	
"Everybody"	Nicole Scherzinger	Nicole Scherzinger; RedOne; Adil Khayat; AJ Junior; Bilal "The Chef"; Jimmy Joker; Beatgeek; Trina Harmon	Killer Love	2011	
"Far Away from Home"	will.i.am featuring Nicole Scherzinger	William Adams; Lukasz Gottwald; Henry Walter	#willpower	2013	
"Fino all'estasi" †	Eros Ramazzotti featuring Nicole Scherzinger	Eros Ramazzotti; Luca Chiaravalli; Anthony Preston; Carlo Rizoli; Saverio Grandi	Noi	2012	
"Fire"	50 Cent featuring Young Buck & Nicole Scherzinger	Curtis Jackson; Andre Young; Dawaun Parker; Sylvester Jordan; Nikki Grier	Curtis	2007	
"First Time"	Nicole Scherzinger	Terius Nash; Christopher Stewart	Big Fat Lie	2014	
"Girl with a Diamond Heart"	Nicole Scherzinger	Terius Nash; Christopher Stewart	Big Fat Lie	2014	
"God of War"	Nicole Scherzinger	Terius Nash; Christopher Stewart	Big Fat Lie	2014	
"The Greatest Love of All"	Jahméne Douglas featuring Nicole Scherzinger	Michael Masser; Linda Creed	Love Never Fails	2013	
"Hasta el Éxtasis" †^{[note 2]}	Eros Ramazzotti featuring Nicole Scherzinger	Eros Ramazzotti; Anthony Preston; Carlo Rizoli; Saverio Grandi; Mila Ortiz Martin	Somos	2012	
"Heartbeat" †^{[note 3]}	Enrique Iglesias featuring Nicole Scherzinger	Enrique Iglesias; Mark Taylor; Jamie Scott	Euphoria	2010	
"Heartbreaker"	Nicole Scherzinger	Terius Nash; Christopher Stewart	Big Fat Lie	2014	
"Hotel Room Service" (remix) †	Pitbull featuring Nicole Scherzinger	Armando C. Perez; James Scheffer; Nile Rodgers; Bernard Edwards; Luther Campbell; David Hobbs; Mark Ross; Christopher Wongwon; Hugh Brankin; Ross Campbell; John Reid; Graham Wilson	Pitbull Starring in Rebelution	2009	
"Hush Hush; Hush Hush" †	The Pussycat Dolls featuring Nicole Scherzinger ^{[note 4]}	Andreas Romdhane; Josef Larossi; Ina Wroldsen; Nicole Scherzinger; Freddie Perren; Dino Fekaris	Doll Domination (re-release), Doll Domination 2.0 and Doll Domination: The Mini Collection	2009	
"Io Ti Penso Amore"	David Garrett featuring Nicole Scherzinger	Niccolò Paganini; Bernard Rose	Garrett vs. Paganini	2014	
"I Try Is Cool and All, But (Skit)"	Macy Gray featuring Nicole Scherzinger	Macy Gray; Nicole Scherzinger; Hal Wilner	Covered	2012	
"Jai Ho! (You Are My Destiny)" †	A. R. Rahman & The Pussycat Dolls featuring Nicole Scherzinger	Nicole Scherzinger; Ester Dean; Ron Fair; Evan Bogart; Erika Nuri; David Quiñones; Nailah Thorbourne; Nyanda Thorbourne; Candace Thorbourne	Doll Domination (re-release), Doll Domination 2.0 and Doll Domination: The Mini Collection	2009	
"Just a Girl"	Nicole Scherzinger	Terius Nash; Christopher Stewart	Big Fat Lie	2014	
"Killer Love"	Nicole Scherzinger	Nicole Scherzinger; RedOne; AJ Junior; Bilal "The Chef"; Beatgeek; Jimmy Joker	Killer Love	2011	
"Lie About Us" †	Avant featuring Nicole Scherzinger	Beau Dozier; Bruce Boniface	Director	2006	
"Little Boy"	Nicole Scherzinger	Terius Nash; Christopher Stewart	Big Fat Lie	2014	
"Love Song to the Earth" †	Paul McCartney, Jon Bon Jovi, Sheryl Crow, Fergie, Colbie Caillat, Natasha Bedingfield, Leona Lewis, Sean Paul, Johnny Rzeznik, Krewella, Angélique Kidjo, Kelsea Ballerini, Nicole Scherzinger, Christina Grimmie, Victoria Justice & Q'orianka Kilcher	Toby Gad; John Shanks; Natasha Bedingfield; Sean Paul	—N/a	2015	
"Memory" (from Cats)	Il Divo featuring Nicole Scherzinger	Andrew Lloyd Webber; Roberto Ferri	A Musical Affair	2013	
"Memory" (from Cats)	Nicole Scherzinger	Andrew Lloyd Webber; Trevor Nunn	Unmasked: The Platinum Collection	2018	
"Missing You" †	Alex Gaudino featuring Nicole Scherzinger	Nicole Scherzinger; Alfonso Fortunato Gaudino; Giuseppe D'Albenzio; Autumn Rowe	—N/a	2013	
"Mona Lisa Smile"	will.i.am ^{[note 5]}	William Adams; George Pajon, Jr. Antônio Maria; Luis Bonfa	—N/a	2016	
"Nandito Ako"	Regine Velasquez & Nicole Schzerzinger	Aaron Paul del Rosario	Giliw: A Troy Laureta OPM Collective, Vol. 2	2021	
"No Llores por Mi Argentina" (from Evita)	Andrea Bocelli & Nicole Schzerzinger	Andrew Lloyd Webber; Tim Rice	Cinema	2015	
"No One Loves Me"	Black Eyed Peas & Nicole Scherzinger	Damien LeRoy, William Adams; Arnel Pineda; Jaime Luis Gomez, James Brown	Elevation	2022	
"O Holy Night"	Nicole Scherzinger	Adolphe Adam	A Very Special Christmas – Essential	2013	
"On the Rocks" †	Nicole Scherzinger	Terius Nash; Christopher Stewart; Carlos McKinney	Big Fat Lie	2014	
"Pangako"	Nicole Scherzinger	Ogie Alcasid	Kaibigan: A Troy Laureta OPM Collective, Vol. 1	2020	
"Papi"	Todrick Hall featuring Nicole Scherzinger	Jean-Yves Ducornet; Todrick Hall; Carl McGrier; Kofi Ofori-Owusu	Straight Outta Oz	2016	
"Papi Lover"	Daddy Yankee featuring Nicole Scherzinger	Raymond Ayala; Nicole Scherzinger; Kara DioGuardi	El Cartel: The Big Boss	2007	
"Poison" †	Nicole Scherzinger	Nicole Scherzinger; RedOne; Bilal "The Chef"; Beatgeek; AJ Junior; Kinnda "Kee" Hamid	Killer Love	2011	
"Power's Out"	Nicole Scherzinger featuring Sting	Terius Nash; Christopher Stewart; Thaddis Harrell	Killer Love	2011	
"Puakenikeni" †	Nicole Scherzinger	Nicole Scherzinger; Aliaune Thiam; Giorgio Tuinfort; Nailah Thorbourne; Nyanda Thorbourne	—N/a	2007	
"Right There" †	Nicole Scherzinger	James Scheffer; Ester Dean; Frank Romano; Daniel Morris	Killer Love	2011	
"Right There" †	Nicole Scherzinger featuring 50 Cent	James Scheffer; Ester Dean; Curtis Jackson; Frank Romano; Daniel Morris	Killer Love (deluxe edition)	2011	
"Rio" (Caress Brazilian Mix) #	Nicole Scherzinger	Simon Le Bon; John Taylor; Roger Taylor; Andy Taylor; Nick Rhodes	—N/a	2008	
"Run" †	Nicole Scherzinger	Justin Tranter; Felix Snow; Julia Michaels	Big Fat Lie	2014	
"Say Yes"	Nicole Scherzinger	RedOne; Jimmy Joker; Jonas Saeed; Pontus Söderqvist; Nailah Thourbourne; Nyanda Thourbourne; Tasha Thourbourne; Candace Thourbourne	Killer Love	2011	
"Scream" †	Timbaland featuring Keri Hilson & Nicole Scherzinger	Tim Mosley; Keri Hilson; Nate Hills	Shock Value	2007	
"Serenity"	David Garrett and Royal Philharmonic Orchestra featuring Franck van der Heijden featuring Nicole Scherzinge	David Garrett; Franck van der Heijden; Eliot Kennedy	Explosive (deluxe edition)	2015	
"She's Bingo" #	MC Blitzy featuring Luis Fonsi & Nicole Scherzinger	Daniel Vangarde; Jean Kluger; Luis Fonsi; Roy Uadri; Tomer Biran	—N/a	2021	
"Smile Mona Lisa"	will.i.am^{[note 6]}	William Adams; George Pajon, Jr. Antônio Maria; Luis Bonfa	#willpower	2013	
"Supa Hypnotic"	Shaggy featuring Nicole Scherzinger	Alex Cantrall; Carsten Schack; Kenneth Karlin; Lindy Robbins; Orville Richard Burrell	Clothes Drop	2005	
"Supervillain" †	Nicole Scherzinger	Timothy Thomas; Theron Thomas; Theodore Thomas	—N/a	2008	
"(I've Had) The Time of My Life"	The Cast of Dirty Dancing featuring Colt Prattes, Abigail Breslin, J. Quinton Johnson, Nicole Scherzinger, Debra Messing, and Bruce Greenwood	Dave "Curlee" Williams; James Faye "Roy" Hall	Dirty Dancing: Original Television Soundtrack	2017	
"Tomorrow Never Dies"	Nicole Scherzinger	Andrew Harr; Jermaine Jackson; Bonnie McKee; Kelly Sheehan; Alex Delicata	Killer Love	2011	
"Trust Me I Lie"	Nicole Scherzinger	Diane Warren	Killer Love (deluxe edition)	2011	
"Try with Me" †	Nicole Scherzinger	Carsten Schack; Sean Hurley; Olivia Nervo; Miriam Nervo	Killer Love (deluxe edition)	2011	
"Until U Love U"	Nicole Scherzinger	Diane Warren	Doll Domination (deluxe edition)	2008	
"Unison"	Nicole Scherzinger	Terius Nash; Christopher Stewart	Big Fat Lie	2014	
"We Are the World 25 for Haiti" †	Artists for Haiti	Michael Jackson; Lionel Richie	—N/a	2010	
"Wet	Nicole Scherzinger	Mikkel S. Eriksen; Tor Erik Hermansen; Sandy Wilhelm; Ester Dean; Traci Hale	Killer Love	2011	
"Whatever U Like" †	Nicole Scherzinger featuring T.I.	Sean Garrett; Clifford Harris; Nicole Scherzinger; Jamal Jones	—N/a	2007	
"Where You Are	Christopher Jackson, Rachel House, Nicole Scherzinger, Auliʻi Cravalho & Louise Bush	Lin-Manuel Miranda; Opetaia Foa'i; Mark Mancina	Moana	2016	
"Whole Lotta Shakin' Goin' On"	Nicole Scherzinger and Abigail Breslin	Dave "Curlee" Williams; James Faye "Roy" Hall	Dirty Dancing: Original Television Soundtrack	2017	
"Wings"	Black Eyed Peas featuring Nicole Scherzinger	William Adams; Arnel Pineda; Jaime Luis Gomez	Masters of the Sun Vol. 1	2018	
"You Are My Miracle" †	Vittorio Grigolo and Nicole Scherzinger	Romano Musumarra; Giorgio Flavio Pintus	In the Hands of Love	2006	
"You Will Be Loved"	Nicole Scherzinger	Timothy Thomas; Theron Thomas; Julian Swirsky	Killer Love	2011	
"Your Love" †	Nicole Scherzinger	Terius Nash; Christopher Stewart	Big Fat Lie	2014	

== Unreleased songs ==
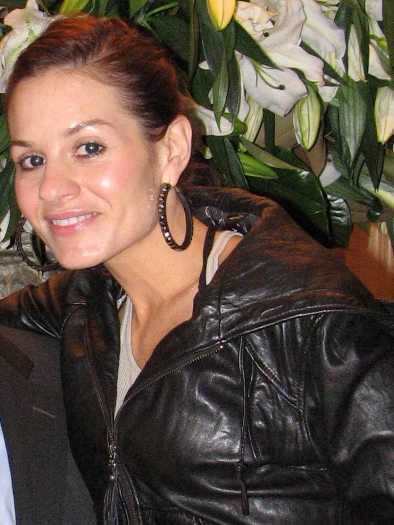
American songwriter Kara DioGuardi collaborated several times with Scherzinger on songs that largely remain unreleased.

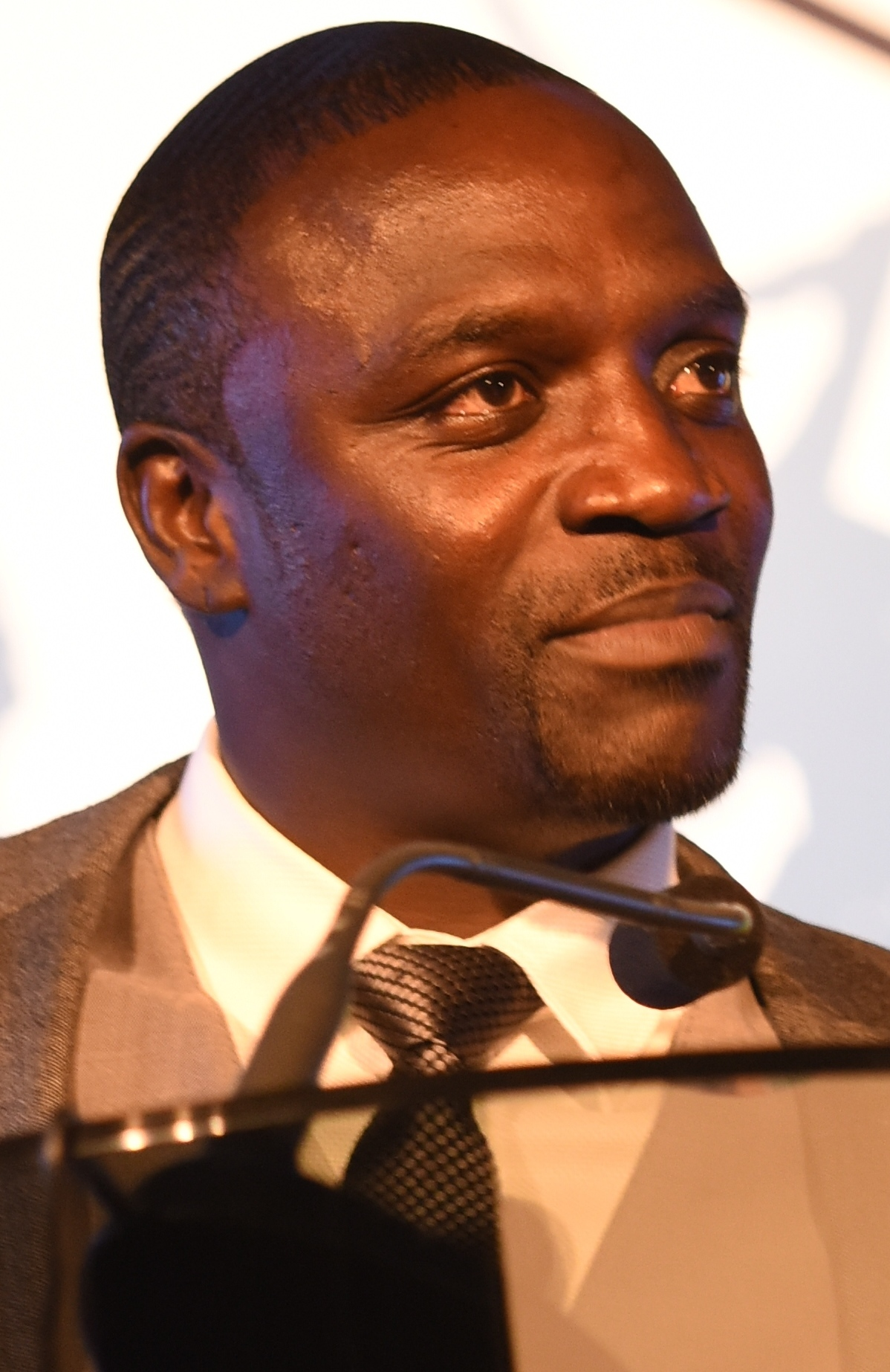
Musician Akon co-wrote "Puakenikini" and "On My Side" for Scherzinger.

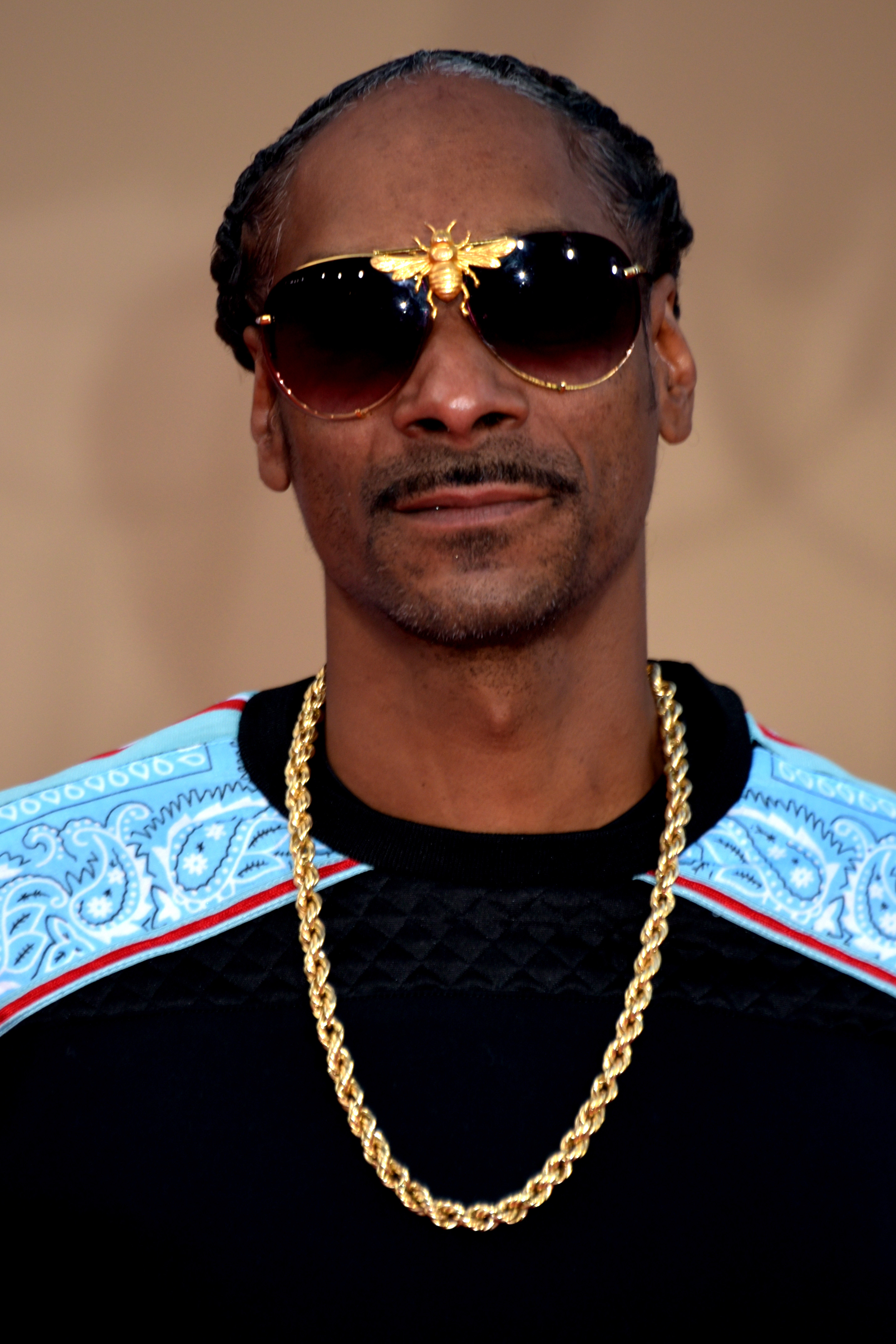
Rapper Snoop Dogg featured on the song "Peep Show", which was unreleased after the US release of Killer Love was cancelled.

List of unreleased songs showing notes about them
Song	Notes	Ref.
"Alienated"	Written by Keri Hilson, Timothy "Attitude" Clayton and Cory Bold; Recorded for Scherzinger's scrapped debut album Her Name is Nicole; When Her Name is Nicole was scrapped and Scherzinger returned to release new music with the Pussycat Dolls, Hilson reclaimed the song and released it on her own debut album In a Perfect World... (2009)	
"Better Than This"	Written by Nicole Scherzinger and Jeffrey Bhasker; Registered with Broadcast Music, Inc.	
"Break Yo Chest"	Written by Lashaunda Carr and Crystal Johnson; Registered with ASCAP; Later Released by the Star Cast (of TV Show)	
"Don't Cry for Me Argentina"	Written by Andrew Lloyd Webber and Tim Rice; Cover of the original song by Julie Covington for the Evita (1976) album and musical of the same name; Scherzinger performed the song on the TV programme Andrew Lloyd Webber: 40 Musical Years on April 4, 2013; Registered with ASCAP	
"Feels So Good"	Written by Scherzinger, Macy Gray, Justin Johnson, Josh Lopez, Jeremy Ruzumna and Philip White; Registered with ASCAP	
"Feels So Good"	Written by Jared Gosselin, other contributing writers unknown; Registered with ASCAP	
"Freedom"	Written by Scherzinger, Andrew Booker, Anya Jones and Katy Tizzard	
"Get Over Yourself"	Written by Matthew Gerrard, John Keller and Michele Vice; Registered with BMI Repertoire; Also recorded by Eden's Crush	
"Happily Never After"	Written by Shaffer Smith and Shea Taylor; Intended for Scherzinger's scrapped debut album Her Name is Nicole; It was later assigned to the Pussycat Dolls for their second album Doll Domination (2008)	
"Holding On"	Written by Scherzinger, Siona Murphy, Jada Ivy and Shahid Khan	
"How Do You Let Go of the One You Love"	Written by Scherzinger, Cathy Dennis and Toby Gad; Registered with ASCAP	
"I Blow"	Intended for Scherzinger's scrapped debut album Her Name is Nicole	
"I Hate This Part"	Written by Wayne Hector, Lucas Secon, Jonas Jeberg and Mitch "Cutfather" Hansen; Intended for Scherzinger's scrapped debut album Her Name is Nicole; It was later assigned to the Pussycat Dolls for their second album Doll Domination (2008)	
"I Miss U"	Intended for Scherzinger's scrapped debut album Her Name is Nicole	
"Just Say Yes"	Written by Gary Lightbody and Garrett "Jacknife Lee; Produced by Gary Lightbody (of Irish alternative rockband Snow Patrol); Registered with ASCAP; Intended for Scherzinger's scrapped debut album Her Name is Nicole; Also assigned/registered to the Pussycat Dolls; Later reclaimed and released by Snow Patrol in 2015	
"Last Goodbye"	Written by Scherzinger, Jake Gosling and Chris Leonard; Registered with ASCAP	
"Love Like This"	Written by Scherzinger, Jamal Jones and Kara Dioguardi; Registered with Broadcast Music, Inc.; Intended for Scherzinger's scrapped debut album Her Name is Nicole	
"March"	Written by Scherzinger, Jamal Jones and Kara Dioguardi; Registered with Broadcast Music, Inc.; Intended for Scherzinger's scrapped debut album Her Name is Nicole	
"Metamorphosis"	Written by Scherzinger, Tobias Gad and Marko Penn; Registered with ASCAP	
"Need You Now"	Written by Scherzinger, Tushar Apte and Dave Mrunal; Registered with ASCAP	
"Never Going Back"	Written by Scherzinger, Tushar Apte and Natalie Dunn; Debuted live at a showcase of music at The Sun Rose, Hollywood in April 2022; Described as being from a future EP called Warrior	
"Nobody Can Change Me"	Written by Tish Hyman, Rashaun Ashley, Remo Green and Sha'Like Rivers; The song debuted on On Air with Ryan Seacrest on May 24, 2010; Registered with SESAC	
"On My Side"	Nicole Scherzinger featuring Akon; Written by Scherzinger, Alaine Thiam, Nailah Thorbourne and Giorgio Tuinfort; Intended for Scherzinger's scrapped debut album Her Name is Nicole; Registered with ASCAP	
"Peep Show"	Nicole Scherzinger featuring R. Kelly and Snoop Dogg; Written by Robert Kelly, Harvey Mason, Jr. and Calvin Broadus; Recorded for the US release of Scherzinger's debut album Killer Love; US version of Killer Love was never released	
"The Phantom of the Opera"	Taken from the opera show The Phantom of the Opera; Written by Andrew Lloyd Webber, Richard Stilgoe, Charles Hart, Mike Batt; Registered with ASCAP; Performed at the 2011 Royal Variety Performance	
"Physical"	Scherzinger featuring Timbaland; Produced by Timbaland; Intended for Scherzinger's scrapped debut album Her Name is Nicole; A snippet of the song was featured in the film Fantastic Four: Rise of the Silver Surfer (2007)	
"Pretty"	Written by Antonio Dixon, Kenneth "Babyface" Edmonds, Alexander Grant and Patrick Smith; Recorded for the US release of Scherzinger's debut album Killer Love; Scherzinger performed the song live during the first US season of The X Factor in December 2011; Leaked in October 2016; Registered with ASCAP; US version of Killer Love was never released	
"Satellite 4"	Written by Scherzinger, Tobias Gad and Melanie Smith; Registered with ASCAP	
"Save Me from Myself"	Written by Scherzinger, Shaffer Smith, Melvin Sparkman and Marcus Allen; Intended for Scherzinger's scrapped debut album Her Name is Nicole; Registered with ASCAP	
"Steam"	Written by Scherzinger, Bryan Michael Cox and Cedric Moore; Registered with Broadcast Music, Inc.	
"When I Grow Up"	Written by Rodney "Darkchild" Jerkins, Theron Thomas, Timothy Thomas, Jim McCarty and Paul Samwell-Smith; Intended for Scherzinger's scrapped debut album Her Name is Nicole; It was later assigned to the Pussycat Dolls for their second album Doll Domination (2008)	
"When You're Falling"	Written by Scherzinger and Aliaune "Akon" Thiam; Intended for Scherzinger's scrapped debut album Her Name is Nicole; Registered with Broadcast Music, Inc.	
"Who's Gonna Love You"	Written by Nicole Scherzinger, Jamal Jones and Kara Dioguardi; Intended for Her Name is Nicole, scrapped debut album; A snippet debuted on Scherzinger's website in 2007; Full version leaked in February 2008; It was later assigned to the Pussycat Dolls for their second album Doll Domination (2008); Registered with Broadcast Music, Inc.	

== See also ==
- Nicole Scherzinger discography
- List of songs recorded by The Pussycat Dolls

== Notes ==
- ^{^[note 1]} "Baby Love" (JR remix) was featured on some released of the international deluxe edition of the Pussycat Dolls's second album Doll Domination.
- ^{^[note 2]} "Hasta el Éxtasis" is the Spanglish recording of "Fino all'estasi".
- ^{^[note 3]} The Rudi Wells Open Heart remix of "Heartbeat" was featured on Scherzinger's debut album Killer Love.
- ^{^[note 4]} Scherzinger is only credited as being featured on "Hush Hush; Hush Hush" in Canada and the United States.
- ^{^[note 5]} "Mona Lisa Smile" is an alternative version of the 2013 song "Smile Mona Lisa", for which Scherzinger has uncredited/additional vocals. The song is taken from will.i.am's 2013 album #willpower.
- ^{^[note 6]} Scherzinger has uncredited/additional vocals on "Smile Mona Lisa" by will.i.am, taken from the latter's 2013 album #willpower.
