= My First Love =

My First Love may refer to:

- My First Love (1945 film), a 1945 French drama film
- My First Love (1988 film), a 1988 comedy-romance TV film
- My First Love (TV series), a 2018 South Korean television series

== Music ==
- "My First Love", song by Gary Usher and Brian Wilson for the 1964 film Muscle Beach Party
- "My First Love", John Fred and the Playboys
- "My First Love" (René & Angela song), 1983
- "My First Love" (Atlantic Starr song), 1989
- "My First Love", first solo single Takako Uehara 1999
- "My First Love", Avant from My Thoughts
- "My First Love", Carl Thomas Let's Talk About It 2004
