= Separated =

Separated can refer to:

- Marital separation of spouses
  - Legal separation of spouses
- "Separated" (song), song by Avant
- Separated sets, a concept in mathematical topology
- Separated space, a synonym for Hausdorff space, a concept in mathematical topology
- Separated morphism, a concept in algebraic geometry analogous to that of separated space in topology
- Separation of conjoined twins, a procedure that allows them to live independently.
- Separation (United States military), status of U.S. military personnel after release from active duty, but still having reserve obligations
