= When It Hurts =

When It Hurts may refer to:

- "When It Hurts", a 2008 song by Avant from Avant
- "When It Hurts", a 2012 song by Leona Lewis from Glassheart
