= Kiss Goodbye (disambiguation) =

"Kiss Goodbye" is a song by Avant.

"Kiss Goodbye" may also refer to:

- "Kiss Goodbye", a song by Little Big Town from The Reason Why
- "A Kiss Goodbye", by Carola from her album My Show, also covered by Whatfor

== See also ==
- "Kiss Goodnight", a 2012 single by Tyler Shaw
- Kiss It Goodbye, a band from Seattle, Washington
- Goodbye kiss (disambiguation)
- Kiss Goodbye, an album by electronic musician DMX Krew
