= Fino all'estasi =

- Cover for the Daddy's Groove Remix

Single by Eros Ramazzotti featuring Nicole Scherzinger

from the album Noi
- Released: May 24, 2013
- Genre: Pop; Latin pop
- Length: 3:45
- Label: Universal
- Songwriters: Eros Ramazzotti; Luca Chiaravalli; Anthony Preston; Carlo Rizoli; Saverio Grandi
- Producers: Ramazzotti; Chiaravalli; Preston

Eros Ramazzotti singles chronology
"Un Angelo Disteso al Sole" (2013)	"Fino all'estasi" (2013)	"Io Prima Di Te" (2013)

Nicole Scherzinger singles chronology
"Boomerang" (2013)	"Fino all'estasi" (2013)	"Missing You" (2013)

Music video
- "Fino all'estasi" on YouTube

"Fino all'estasi" (Spanish: "Hasta el éxtasis") is a song by Italian singer-songwriter Eros Ramazzotti featuring American recording artist Nicole Scherzinger, released on November 13, 2012, as the second single from the album Noi. A Spanish-language version of the single, titled "Hasta el éxtasis", was also released to launch the Hispanic edition of the album, Somos. The song was written by Ramazzotti, Luca Chiaravalli, Anthony Preston, Carlo Rizoli, Mila Ortiz Martin and Saverio Grandi.

== Background and release ==
On July 21, it was announced that Eros Ramazzotti had left Sony Music and signed a recording contract with Universal Music Group. A few days later, Ramazzotti's manager Giancarlo Giannini, announced that he had planned to start working on new material between September and October 2011, in order to release a new album in November 2012. However, in January 2012, Ramazzotti split with his manager, replacing him with Michele Torpedine. In August 2012, it was announced that the new album would be released on 13 November 2012, while the album title was revealed on September 4, 2012.

Of the song, Ramazzotti commented: "Nicole and I must have met in a previous life. I truly enjoy working with her. It's a great experience. I've recorded many duets in my career : Tina Turner, Cher, and now Nicole. I'd say my voice matches well with the Italian language singing of these talented singers."

== Music video ==
"Fino all'estasi" is a black & white, classic and elegant video with a high visual impact and a bit of irony, clearly showing how Eros and Scherzinger had fun during a shooting break. The video was filmed and directed in Milan, Italy by Robert Hales with the artistic direction of Luca Tommassini. The music video premiered on VEVO on June 12, 2013.

== Track listing ==
"Fino all'estasi" – digital download

1. "Fino all'estasi" – 3:45
2. "Hasta el éxtasis" - 3:45

== Charts and certifications ==
=== Weekly charts ===
Chart (2013)	Peak position
Belgium (Ultratip Wallonia)	11
Belgium (Ultratip Flanders)	68
Hungary (Rádiós Top 40)	36
Italy (FIMI)	20

=== Certifications ===
Region	Certification	Certified units/sales
Italy (FIMI)	Gold	15,000^{*}
^{*} Sales figures based on certification alone.

== Release history ==
Country	Date	Format	Label
Italy	May 24, 2013	Contemporary hit radio	Universal Music
