= You Know What =

Single by Avant featuring Lil Wayne

from the album Director
- Released: 2006
- Genre: R&B
- Length: 3:47
- Label: Geffen
- Songwriters: Myron Avant; Dwayne Carter; Jermaine Dupri; Manuel Seal
- Producers: Jermaine Dupri; Manuel Seal (co.)

Avant singles chronology
"Can't Wait" (2004)	"You Know What" (2006)	"4 Minutes" (2006)

Lil Wayne singles chronology
"Stuntin' Like My Daddy" (2006)	"You Know What" (2006)	"You" (2006)

"You Know What" is a song by American singer Avant featuring rapper Lil Wayne. It was written by Avant, Lil Wayne, Jermaine Dupri, and Manuel Seal for his fourth studio album Director (2006), while production was helmed by Dupri and Seal. Geffen Records released the song as the lead single from the album. It peaked at number 58 on the US Billboard Hot R&B/Hip-Hop Songs. A video for the song was directed by Benny Boom.

== Music video ==
An accompanying music video for "You Know What" was directed by Benny Boom and filmed in Los Angeles, California. The video shows Avant finding a girl, portrayed by Candace Pillay, and gets attracted to her. When they start kissing, they are interrupted by someone three times.

== Track listings ==
CD single
No.	Title	Length
1.	"You Know What" (featuring Lil Wayne)	3:49

== Charts ==
Chart (2006)	Peak position
US Hot R&B/Hip-Hop Songs (Billboard)	58
