= Lie About Us =

Single by Avant featuring Nicole Scherzinger

from the album Director
- Released: July 31, 2006
- Genre: R&B
- Length: 4:09
- Label: Geffen; Interscope
- Songwriters: Beau Dozier; Bruce Boniface
- Producers: Beau Dozier; Ron Fair

Avant singles chronology
"4 Minutes" (2006)	"Lie About Us" (2006)	"When It Hurts" (2006)

Nicole Scherzinger singles chronology
"Lie About Us" (2006)	"You Are My Miracle" (2006)

Music video
- "Lie About Us" on YouTube

"Lie About Us" is a song recorded by American singer Avant from his fourth studio album Director (2006), featuring American singer Nicole Scherzinger. The song was written by Beau Dozier and Bruce Boniface and its production was handled by Dozier and Ron Fair. The track was inspired by the time Dozier had a secret affair with singer Joss Stone while being in a relationship. In the neo soul song the lyrics chronicles the man's promise to the mistress and come clean about the relationship. It was released as the album's fourth single on July 31, 2006 to urban contemporary stations in the United States. An accompanying music video was released several days earlier and portrays the artists as love interests.

Quentin B. Huff of PopMatters complimented Scherzinger's vocals and highlighted as a standout from the album but Johnny Dee of The Guardian was more critical. "Lie About Us" peaked at number one on the US Billboard Bubbling Under R&B/Hip-Hop Singles chart and peaked at number 76 and nine on the UK Singles Chart and UK R&B chart, respectively.

== Background and release ==
"Lie About Us" was first recorded by the German band Bro'Sis for their 2004 album, Showtime. In 2006, American singers Avant and Nicole Scherzinger re-recorded the song for the former's fourth studio album, Director. Scherzinger, who at that time found success as the lead singer of the Pussycat Dolls and was preparing to launch her solo career, wanted to include the song on her shelved album, Her Name is Nicole, however, Avant's team insisted that it should go on his record. "Lie About Us" marks their second collaboration together as Avant previously appeared on an urban remix of the Pussycat Dolls' song "Stickwitu" released in September 2005.

In the United States, the song was serviced to urban contemporary and rhythmic contemporary formats on July 31 and August 7, 2006, respectively. In Germany, a vinyl was released in September 2006 which included a cappella and instrumental versions of the song. A month later, "Lie About Us" was available for digital download in the United Kingdom. An accompanying music video was directed by Benny Boom during the month of May and it premiered on Yahoo! on July 21, 2006. In the music video, Scherzinger portrays Avant's love interest and discuss how to come clean with this relationship. Johnny Dee of The Guardian describes the video as "hi-tech cheese" for the use of a split-screen wall between the artists.

== Lyrics and reception ==
"Lie About Us" has been labelled as neo soul by Dee. The song is about secret relationship of a man and his mistress with the promise to leave the other woman and come clean to the world about their affair as chronicled in the lines, "Please don't say you wanna give up / How do I tell her that I'm fallin' in love / And I know you're waiting patiently for that day that we no longer have to lie about us". Quentin B. Huff of PopMatters noted that the mistress has doubts and isn't going into this blindly. "Lie About Us" was inspired by Beau Dozier's relationship with soul singer Joss Stone. Dozier fell in love with Stone while he was dating another woman, but eventually finished things in favor for Stone. They spent two years together before splitting in November 2005. Dozier co-wrote it with Bruce Boniface and produced it with Ron Fair.

Huff labelled the song as an "other possible standout" track in Director praising Scherzinger for providing "fine vocals" and felt the song "make[s] for a nice duet". Dee described the song as "greasy". Commercially, "Lie About Us" did not enter the US Hot R&B/Hip-Hop Songs chart, though it charted on the US Billboard Bubbling Under R&B/Hip-Hop Singles, a component chart which represents the 25 songs which failed to make an impact on the former chart. The song peaked at number one on September 16, 2006, spending 12 weeks on the chart. In the UK, the song entered and peaked at number 76 and nine on the UK Singles Chart and its component R&B chart, on the week ending November 11, 2006.

== Track listing ==
Digital download / CD single

1. "Lie About Us" – 4:09
2. "Lie About Us" (Dave Audé Club Mix) – 8:49

Vinyl

1. "Lie About Us" (Radio edit) – 3:48
2. "Lie About Us" (Instrumental) – 3:50
3. "Lie About Us" (A cappella) – 3:44

== Credits and personnel ==
Credits adapted from the liner notes of Director.

- Avant – lead artist
- Bruce Boniface – songwriter
- Grecco Buratto – guitar
- Beau Dozier – producer, songwriter
- Mike Eleopoulos – engineering
- Ron Fair – producer, string arrangement, conduct
- Tal Herzberg – co-producer, Pro Tools
- Peter Mokran – mixer
- Nicole Scherzinger – featured artist

== Charts ==
Chart performance for "Lie About Us"
Chart (2006)	Peak position
UK Singles (Official Charts)	76
UK Hip Hop/R&B (Official Charts)	9
US Bubbling Under R&B/Hip-Hop Singles (Billboard)	1

== Release history ==
Release dates and formats for "Lie About Us"
Country	Date	Format	Label	Ref
United States	July 31, 2006	Urban contemporary	Interscope; Geffen	
United States	August 7, 2006	Rhythmic contemporary	Interscope; Geffen	
Germany	September 7, 2006	Vinyl	Universal Music	
United Kingdom	October 23, 2006	Digital download	Universal Island	
