= Goodbye kiss =

Goodbye kiss may refer to:

- The Goodbye Kiss (album) (Chinese: 吻別; pinyin: wěnbié), a 1993 album by Jacky Cheung, and the title song
- "Goodbye Kiss", a song by Kasabian
- The Goodbye Kiss (Italian: Arrivederci amore, ciao), a novel by Massimo Carlotto
- The Goodbye Kiss (film) (Italian: Arrivederci amore, ciao), a 2006 Italian crime film based on the novel
- The Good-Bye Kiss, a 1928 American comedy film
- Goodbye kiss, a term describing capitulation by the target of a greenmail challenge

== See also ==
- Kiss Goodbye (disambiguation)
