= The VIII =

Studio album by Avant
- Released: September 25, 2015
- Length: 46:21
- Label: Mo-B
- Producer: Tommy Brown; Mitch Cohn; Dot-N Pro; Steven Franks; Slavic Livins; Travis Sayles

Avant chronology
Face the Music (2013)	The VIII (2015)	Can We Fall in Love (2020)

The VIII is the eighth studio album by American singer Avant. It was released by Mo-B Entertainment, Caroline Records, and Universal Music on September 25, 2015 in the United States.

== Critical reception ==
Professional ratings
Review scores
Source	Rating
Allmusic	3/5 stars

Andy Kellman from Allmusic rated The VIII three stars out of five. He found that "though this is as sonically consistent as any previous Avant album – mostly silky, with a little grit here and there – the subject matter fluctuates in the extreme [...] Longtime fans nonetheless should have little trouble quickly identifying a handful of cuts that rate with the past highlights."

== Track listing ==
No.	Title	Writer(s)	Producer	Length
1.	"Find a Way"	Myron Avant; Joseph Harley; Travis Sayles	Sayles	4:03
2.	"Special"	Avant; Sayles	Sayles	3:19
3.	"Apart"	Avant; Sayles	Sayles	3:34
4.	"Lights Off"	Avant; Sayles; Antwan Plaskett; Shaun Thomas	Dot-N Pro	2:49
5.	"Come Get It"	Avant; Sayles; Steven Franks; Tommy Brown	Sayles; Franks; Brown	3:42
6.	"Best Friend (Part II)"	Avant; Sayles	Sayles	3:36
7.	"Note"	Avant; Harley; Sayles	Sayles; Avant^{[a]}; Harley^{[a]}	4:12
8.	"Both of Us"	Avant; Sayles; Mitch "Catalyst" Cohn	Sayles; Cohn	4:07
9.	"I'm Not Telling"	Avant; Sandy Redd; Melinda Bussie; Slavic Livins	Slavic Livins	3:07
10.	"Mines Do"	Avant; Sayles	Sayles	3:27
11.	"You Know Better" (featuring Malone)	Avant; Sayles; Franks; Brown	Sayles; Franks; Brown	3:47
12.	"Take It There"	Avant; Sayles	Sayles	3:12
13.	"Doesn't Matter"	Avant; Redd; Bob Robinson	Livins	3:27

Notes

- ^{^[a]} denotes co-producer

== Charts ==
Chart (2015)	Peak position
US Billboard 200	95
US Top R&B/Hip-Hop Albums (Billboard)	8
