= Kiss Goodbye =

Single by Avant

from the album The Letter
- Released: September 21, 2010
- Genre: R&B
- Length: 3:48
- Label: Verve Forecast
- Songwriters: Avant; Antonio Dixon; Eric Dawkins
- Producer: The Pentagon

Avant singles chronology
"Break Ya Back (In a Good Way)" (2008)	"Kiss Goodbye" (2010)	"Your Body Is the Business" (2011)

"Kiss Goodbye" is a song by American R&B singer Avant. It was written by Avant along with Antonio Dixon and Eric Dawkins for Avant's sixth album The Letter (2010), while production was helmed by Dixon and Dawkins under their production moniker the Pentagon. Released as the album's lead single, it peaked at number 11 on the Adult R&B Songs chart.

== Credits and personnel ==
Credits lifted from the album's liner notes.

- Myron Avant – writing
- Antonio Dixon – production, writing
- Eric Dawkins – production, writing

== Charts ==
Chart (2010)	Peak position
US Adult R&B Songs (Billboard)	11
US Hot R&B/Hip-Hop Songs (Billboard)	60

== Release history ==
Region	Date	Format	Label	Ref.
Worldwide	September 21, 2010	Digital download	Verve Forecast	
