= Can We Fall in Love =

Studio album by Avant
- Released: July 10, 2020
- Length: 36:16
- Label: SoNo; Mo-B
- Producer: Avant; Travis Sayles

Avant chronology
The VIII (2015)	Can We Fall in Love (2020)

Can We Fall in Love is the ninth studio album by American singer Avant. It was released by SoNo Recording Group and Mo-B Entertainment on July 10, 2020, in the United States. and includes the Top 30 Urban AC hit "Not Gone Lose."

== Singles ==
The lead single "Not Gone Lose" premiered in February 2019 and released to streaming services on March 8, 2019. It peaked at number 23 on Billboard's Adult R&B Songs chart in April 2019. The follow-up single "Edible" premiered in June 2020, ahead of the album's announcement. The third and final single was the title track which was released on October 29, 2020.

== Accolades ==
Can We Fall in Love received a nomination at the UB Honors 2020 for Best Independent R&B Release.

== Remix EPs ==
Avant did a collaboration in 2021 with Terry Hunter and released three remix EPs for the album tracks "Can We Fall in Love", "Take It Slow" and "Nothing Without You".

== Track listing ==
All tracks produced by Avant and Travis Sayles.

No.	Title	Writer(s)	Length
1.	"You Don't Love Me No More"	Myron Avant; Travis Sayles; Maurice Brown	3:54
2.	"Can We Fall in Love"	Avant; Sayles; Brown	3:27
3.	"Not Gone Lose"	Avant; Sayles	3:32
4.	"All in My Head"	Avant; Sayles	3:17
5.	"Take It Slow" (featuring Robert Glasper)	Avant; Sayles; Joseph Harley; Glasper	5:13
6.	"Edible"	Avant; Sayles	2:58
7.	"Irreplacable"	Avant; Sayles	3:41
8.	"Nothing Without You"	Avant; Sayles	2:59
9.	"Live a Lie"	Avant; Sayles	3:37
10.	"Worth It"	Avant; Sayles; Shawn Carrington; Slavic Livins	3:36
Total length:			36:17

== Release history ==
Can We Fall in Love release history
Region	Date	Format	Label	Ref(s)
Various	July 10, 2020	CD; Digital download; Streaming	SoNo; Mo-B	
