= Separated (song) =

2000 single by Avant

Single by Avant

from the album My Thoughts
- Released: April 11, 2000
- Studio: Streeterville (Chicago, IL)
- Genre: R&B
- Length: 4:15
- Label: Magic Johnson; MCA
- Songwriters: Myron Avant; Steve Huff
- Producer: Steve "Stone" Huff

Avant singles chronology
"Separated" (2000)	"My First Love" (2000)

Kelly Rowland singles chronology
"Separated" (2000)	"Dilemma" (2002)

"Separated" is a song by American R&B singer Avant. It was written by Steve "Stone" Huff and Avant for his debut album My Thoughts (2000), while production was helmed by Huff. MCA Records and Magic Johnson Music released the song as the album's lead single in April 2000. "Separated" spent one week atop the US Hot R&B/Hip-Hop Songs chart, also peaking at number 23 on the US Billboard Hot 100. A remix version of the song, co-written by Sparkle, features singer Kelly Rowland, of Destiny's Child. A different remix features rapper Foxy Brown.

== Track listings ==
CD single
No.	Title	Length
1.	"Separated"	4:16
2.	"Separated (remix)" (featuring Kelly Rowland)	3:58

== Credits and personnel ==
Credits lifted from the album's liner notes.

- Myron Avant – writing
- Steve Huff – production, writing
- Sparkle – writing (remix)

== Charts ==
=== Weekly charts ===
Chart (2000)	Peak position
US Adult R&B Songs (Billboard)	6
US Billboard Hot 100	23
US Hot R&B/Hip-Hop Songs (Billboard)	1

=== Year-end charts ===
Chart (2000)	Position
US Billboard Hot 100	63
US Hot R&B/Hip-Hop Songs (Billboard)	9

== Awards and nominations ==
- Soul Train Music Award
  - 2000, Best R&B/Soul Single, Male (nominated)
