= Director (Avant album) =

Studio album by Avant
- Released: April 25, 2006
- Length: 57:32
- Label: Geffen; Interscope
- Producer: Bryan Michael Cox; Antonio Dixon; Beau Dozier; Jermaine Dupri; Ron Fair; Steve "Stone" Huff; Def Jef; Rodney Jerkins; Ric Rude; Silence; Tricky Stewart; Chris Styles; The Underdogs

Avant chronology
| Private Room (2003) | Director (2006) | Avant (2008) |

Singles from Director
- 1. "You Know What" Released: 2006; 2. "4 Minutes" Released: 2006; 3. "Lie About Us" Released: 2006

Director is the fourth studio album by American R&B singer Avant. It was released by Geffen Records and Interscope Records on April 25, 2006 in the United States. The album marked Avant's first project to include a diverse roster of collaborators, breaking away from the formular on previous album which saw musician Steve "Stone" Huff contributing most material. Production on Director comes courtesy of the likes of Bryan Michael Cox, Jermaine Dupri, Ron Fair, Rodney Jerkins, Tricky Stewart, and The Underdogs.

The album received a mixed reception from critics, many of whom praised Avant's vocal performances and the album's cohesive sound but found the material too generic. Upon its release, Director debuted at number four on the US Billboard 200 with career-high opening sales of 123,000 copies. It also debuted at number one on Top R&B/Hip-Hop Albums chart, becoming Avant's first album to do so. Three singles were released in support of the album, including lead single "You Know What" and follow-up "4 Minutes" which became a top ten hit on the US Hot R&B/Hip-Hop Songs chart.

== Background ==
Following the success of his previous albums Private Room (2003), Avant conceived his follow, Director, as a celebration of creative control and a reaffirmation of his commitment to contemporary R&B. He wrote approximately 80 percent of the album's lyrics, drawing inspiration from the themes of love, heartbreak, and reconciliation that had defined much of his career. Describing the project as an exploration of "the agony and ecstasy of love," Avant sought to emphasize the importance of respect, chivalry, and emotional honesty in relationships. He further described Director as blending an "old school flashback" with a contemporary R&B sound, citing "This Is Your Night" as embodying "the soul of R&B." He also expressed a desire to revive traditional notions of chivalry through the music on Director, commenting, "I think we've lost the chivalry in relationships" and adding that his goal was "to help men understand what a woman really needs."

== Promotion ==
Director was preceded by the released of its lead single "You Know What" featuring rapper Lil Wayne. Produced by Jermaine Dupri and co-written by Manuel Seal, it reached number 58 on the US Hot R&B/Hip-Hop Songs chart. "4 Minutes," a downtempo song which describes a man's desperate attempt to mend a broken relationship, was released as the album's second single. Co-written by Keri Hilson and Patrick "J. Que" Smith and produced by The Underdogs and Antonio Dixon, it peaked at number 52 on the US Billboard Hot 100, and reached number nine on the Hot R&B/Hip-Hop Songs chart, becoming his first top ten hit since 2003's "Read Your Mind."

"Lie About Us," a duet with Pussycat Dolls lead singer Nicole Scherzinger that chronicles a man's promise to his mistress and come clean about the relationship, was issued as the album's third and final single. A leftover from Scherzinger's shelved solo debut album, Her Name is Nicole, it was written by Beau Dozier and Bruce Boniface and was inspired by the time Dozier had a secret affair with English singer Joss Stone while being in a relationship. While it failed to chart in the United States, it marked Avant's charts debut in the United Kingdom where it reached number 76 on the UK Singles Chart and peaked at number nine on the UK R&B Singles chart.

== Critical reception ==
Professional ratings
Review scores
| Source | Rating |
|---|---|
| About.com | 4/5 stars |
| AllMusic | 3.5/5 stars |
| PopMatters | 6/10 |
| Vibe | 3/5 stars |

Director received generally positive reviews from music critics. AllMusic editor Andy Kellman found that, despite its numerous collaborators and guest appearances, the album remained faithful to Avant's signature style, noting that the material was "hardly" any flashier than his previous work. He concluded that fans of Avant's "slick, romantic, slow-to-midtempo songs (with the occasional dash of raunch)" would "find plenty to enjoy here." About.com critic Mark Edward Nero similarly praised the album's cohesive sound, writing that Avant gives listeners "more of the smooth, seductive, romantic songs they've come to expect from him." He credited Avant's "strong voice" with unifying the varied production styles and concluded that his "sophisticated, modern-day approach" to familiar themes remained engaging

Ebony praised Director as further evidence that Avant was a "genuine contemporary R&B artist," highlighting his honest delivery of its "steamy lyrics," lush melodies, and collaborations with Jermaine Dupri and Bryan Michael Cox, while singling out "This Is Your Night," "You Know What," "4 Minutes," and "Mr. Dream" as standout tracks. Quentin B. Huff from PopMatters praised the album's artistic vision, observing that although some songs "do tend to sound alike," Director successfully integrated its diverse production into "a seamless final product." He argued that "what holds the project together is the vision behind it," concluding that Avant's effort "stands alone, without comparison." In a more reserved assessment, Gail Mitchell from Billboard felt that despite Avant's "soothing tenor" and "choice nuggets" such as first-time collaborations with Rodney Jerkins and Dupri, the album "doesn't break much ground."

== Chart performance ==
Director debuted and peaked at number four on the US Billboard 200 in the week of May 13, 2006. With first week sales of 123,000 units, this marked Avant's biggest-selling opening week yet. The album also debuted at number one on the Top R&B/Hip-Hop Albums chat, becoming his first album to do so. By October 2008, Director had sold 434,000 units, according to Nielsen SoundScan.

== Track listing ==
Director track listing
| No. | Title | Writer(s) | Producer(s) | Length |
|---|---|---|---|---|
| 1. | "So Many Ways" | Myron Avant; Haley Campbell; Steve "Stone" Huff; Teraike Crawford; Willie Taylor Philip BangOut Pitts | Chris Styles; Silence; Avant^{[A]} | 4:31 |
| 2. | "This Is Your Night" | Avant; Antonio Dixon; Damon Thomas; Harvey Mason, Jr.; Jeffrey Osborne; Sam Dees | The Underdogs; Dixon | 3:48 |
| 3. | "You Know What" (featuring Lil Wayne) | Avant; Dwayne Carter; Jermaine Dupri; Manuel Seal | Dupri; Avant^{[A]} | 3:47 |
| 4. | "4 Minutes" | Avant; Dixon; Thomas; Mason; Keri Hilson; Patrick "J. Que" Smith | The Underdogs; Dixon | 4:00 |
| 5. | "Stickwitu (Urban Remix)" (with The Pussycat Dolls) | Avant; Franne Golde; Kasia Livingston; Robert Palmer | Ron Fair; Tal Herzberg^{[A]} | 3:14 |
| 6. | "With You" | Avant; Huff; Taylor | Huff | 3:35 |
| 7. | "Exclusive" (featuring Lloyd Banks) | Avant; Jef Fortson; Banks; Huff | Def Jef; Avant^{[A]} | 3:26 |
| 8. | "Right Place, Wrong Time" | Avant; Huff | Stone | 3:51 |
| 9. | "Grown Ass Man" | Adonis Shropshire; LaShawn Daniels; Ricky Lewis; Rodney "Darkchild" Jerkins | Jerkins; Ric Rude | 4:04 |
| 10. | "Director" | Avant; Bryan-Michael Cox; Craig Love; Kendrick Dean | Cox; Love^{[A]} | 3:56 |
| 11. | "Lie About Us" (featuring Nicole Scherzinger) | Beau Dozier; Bruce Boniface | Fair; Dozier; Herzberg^{[A]} | 4:08 |
| 12. | "Imagination" | Avant; Christopher "Tricky" Stewart; Julio Miranda; Huff | Stewart; Avant^{[A]} | 3:51 |
| 13. | "Mr. Dream" | Shropshire; Makeba Riddick; Jerkins | Jerkins | 3:53 |
| 14. | "Now You Got Someone" | Avant; Thomas; Mason | The Underdogs | 4:06 |
| 15. | "GPSA (Ghetto Public Service Announcement)" (featuring Jermaine Dupri) | Avant; Dupri; Seal | Dupri; Seal^{[A]}; Avant^{[A]} | 3:18 |

International bonus track
| No. | Title | Writer(s) | Producer(s) | Length |
|---|---|---|---|---|
| 16. | "Maker" | Avant; Huff | Stone | 3:32 |

iTunes bonus track
| No. | Title | Writer(s) | Producer(s) | Length |
|---|---|---|---|---|
| 16. | "You Know What (Remix)" (featuring David Banner) | Avant; Lavell Crump; Dupri; Seal | Dupri; Avant^{[A]} | 3:54 |

Notes

- ^{^[A]} denotes co-producer

Sample credits

- "This Is Your Night" contains interpolations from the composition "Where Did We Go Wrong", written by Sam Dees and Jeffrey Osborne.

== Charts ==
=== Weekly charts ===
Weekly chart performance for Director
| Chart (2006) | Peak position |
|---|---|
| US Billboard 200 | 4 |
| US Top R&B/Hip-Hop Albums (Billboard) | 1 |

=== Year-end charts ===
Year-end chart performance for Director
| Chart (2006) | Position |
|---|---|
| US Billboard 200 | 170 |
| US Top R&B/Hip-Hop Albums (Billboard) | 42 |
