= Avant (album) =

Studio album by Avant
- Released: December 9, 2008
- Label: Capitol
- Producers: Avant (also exec.); Jerry Woodard (exec.); Shawn "The Black Irishman" Campbell; Mr. Collipark; Eric Dawkins; Antonio Dixon; Marshall J. Leathers; Poke & Tone; Spanador; Dontae "The Metaphysician" Winslow

Avant chronology
Director (2006)	Avant (2008)	The Letter (2010)

Singles from Avant
- 1. "When It Hurts" Released: August 14, 2008; 2. "Break Ya Back" Released: November 2008; 3. "Material Things" Released: August 25, 2009

Avant is the fifth studio album by American singer Avant. It was released on December 9, 2008, on Capitol Records. Its first single, "When It Hurts" reached number 91 on the US Billboard Hot 100 and number 15 on the Hot R&B/Hip-Hop Songs chart. Its second single was "Break Ya Back (In a Good Way)".

== Critical reception ==
Professional ratings
Review scores
Source	Rating
About.com	2.5/5 stars
AllMusic	3/5 stars
DJBooth.net	3.5/5 stars
Entertainment Weekly	B
USA Today	2.5/4 stars

Andy Kellman from AllMusic rated the album three and a half stars out of five. He felt that "on Avant, he goes both harder and softer [...] In between two poles is a typical Avant album, no bad thing. The album, in fact, contains the best opening three-song sequence of his career." USA Today's Steve Jones described Avant as a collection of the smooth, sensual ballads and simmering midtempo grooves that had become the singer's trademark, praising its mood-setting romantic themes while noting that Avant remained more restrained than contemporaries such as R. Kelly. Mikael Wood of Entertainment Weekly gave Avant a B rating, praising its "sturdy, no-frills soul tunes" and noting that Avant's singing "complicates club-dude machismo with sensitive-guy melancholy." While he felt that "Break Ya Back" overindulged in "bedroom bravado," he concluded that Avant proves "it's possible to be both a lover and a fighter."

== Commercial performance ==
Avant debuted at number 26 on the US Billboard 200 and number six on the Top R&B/Hip-Hop Albums chart, becoming his lowest-charting album on both charts since his debut album My Thoughts (2000). By 2010, it had sold 162,000 copies in the United States.

== Track listing ==
Avant track listing
No.	Title	Writer(s)	Producer(s)	Length
1.	"Sensuality"	Myron Avant; Marshall Leathers; Paul Campbell; Shawn Campbell	Leathers; P. Campbell; S. Campbell; Avant^{[a]}	3:10
2.	"Perfect Gentleman"	Avant; Claude "Quo" Forbes; Alexander Mosley; Jean-Claude Olivier; Samuel Barnes	Poke & Tone; Spandador	2:44
3.	"Involve Yourself"	Avant; Jimmy Dumas; Michael Crooms; Dontae Winslow	Mr. Collipark; Avant^{[a]}	3:41
4.	"When It Hurts"	Avant; Antonio Dixon; Eric Dawkins	Dixon; Dawkins	3:55
5.	"Out of Character"	Avant; Dumas; Crooms; Winslow	Mr. Collipark; Avant^{[a]}	3:43
6.	"Material Things"	Avant; Winslow	Winslow	2:47
7.	"French Pedicure"	Avant; Winslow	Winslow	3:48
8.	"Attention" (featuring Snoop Dogg)	Avant; Antonio Dixon; Dawkins; Calvin Broadus	Dixon; Dawkins	3:28
9.	"Break Ya Back"	Avant; Winslow	Winslow; Avant^{[a]}	3:25
10.	"Y.O.U."	Avant; Dixon; Dawkins; Percy Bady	Dixon; Dawkins	4:04
11.	"Sailing"	Christopher Cross	Dixon; Dawkins	4:15

Notes

- ^{^[a]} denotes co-producer

== Charts ==
=== Weekly charts ===
Chart (2008)	Peak position
US Billboard 200	26
US Top R&B/Hip-Hop Albums (Billboard)	6

=== Year-end charts ===
Chart (2009)	Position
US Top R&B/Hip-Hop Albums (Billboard)	43
