= Un angelo disteso al sole =

"Un Angelo Disteso al Sole/ Un Ángel Como el Sol tú Eres"

Single by Eros Ramazzotti

from the album Noi
- Released: 12 October 2012
- Genre: Pop, latin pop
- Length: 3:22
- Songwriters: Eros Ramazzotti, Luca Chiaravalli, Saverio Grandi

Eros Ramazzotti singles chronology
| "Inevitabile" (2012) | "Un Angelo Disteso al Sole/ Un Ángel Como el Sol tú Eres" (2012) |

Music video
- "Un angelo disteso al sole" on YouTube

"Un angelo disteso al sole/ Un ángel como el sol tú eres" is a song by Italian singer-songwriter Eros Ramazzotti, released on 12 October 2012 as the lead single from the album Noi. A Spanish-language version of the single, titled "Un ángel como el sol tú eres", was also released to launch the Hispanic edition of the album, Somos.

The song was written by Ramazzotti with Luca Chiaravalli and Saverio Grandi.

It has since been covered in Greek by The Voice of Greece winner Maria Elena Kyriakou.

== Track listing ==
"Un angelo disteso al sole" – digital download

1. "Un angelo disteso al sole" – 3:23

"Un ángel como el sol tú eres" – digital download

1. "Un ángel como el sol tú eres" – 3:22

== Charts and certifications ==
=== Weekly charts ===
Weekly chart performance for "Un angelo disteso al sole"
| Chart (2012) | Peak position |
|---|---|
| Belgium (Ultratip Bubbling Under Flanders) | 16 |
| Belgium (Ultratop 50 Wallonia) | 36 |
| France (SNEP) | 188 |
| Germany (GfK) | 66 |
| Italy (FIMI) | 5 |
| Italy Airplay (EarOne) | 1 |
| Mexico Español Airplay (Billboard) | 25 |
| Spain (PROMUSICAE) | 20 |
| Switzerland (Schweizer Hitparade) | 27 |

=== Year-end charts ===
Year-end chart performance for "Un angelo disteso al sole"
| Chart (2012) | Rank |
|---|---|
| Italy (FIMI) | 46 |
| Italian Airplay (EarOne) | 60 |

| Chart (2013) | Rank |
|---|---|
| Italy (Musica e dischi) | 93 |

=== Certifications ===
Certifications for "Un angelo disteso al sole"
| Region | Certification | Certified units/sales |
|---|---|---|
| Italy (FIMI) | Platinum | 30,000^{*} |
^{*} Sales figures based on certification alone.

== Adaptations ==
Greek singer Elena Kyriakou, winner of the first Voice of Greece, covered the song in Greek in 2014 in her album of the same title, Δυο άγγελοι στη γη (Two angels on earth).
