= Ecstasy (Avant album) =

Studio album by Avant
- Released: March 26, 2002
- Genre: R&B
- Length: 54:30
- Labels: MCA; Magic Johnson
- Producers: Avant (exec.); Steve Huff (exec.); Magic Johnson (exec.); Eric Payton (exec.)

Avant chronology
My Thoughts (2000)	Ecstasy (2002)	Private Room (2003)

Singles from My Thoughts
- 1. "Makin' Good Love" Released: 2002; 2. "Don't Say No, Just Say Yes" Released: 2002; 3. "You Ain't Right" Released: 2002

Ecstasy is the second studio album by American singer Avant. It was released by MCA Records and Magic Johnson Music on March 26, 2002 in the United States. The singer reteamed with Steve "Stone" Huff to produce the majority of the album. It debuted and peaked at number six on the US Billboard 200 and number two on the Top R&B/Hip-Hop Albums, selling more than 713,000 copies. Ecstasy produced three singles, including "Makin' Good Love", "Don't Say No, Just Say Yes" and "You Ain't Right".

== Critical reception ==
Professional ratings
Review scores
Source	Rating
AllMusic	3/5 stars
Slant	2.5/5 stars
USA Today	2.5/4 stars

Alex Henderson from Allmusic found that "creatively, Avant's sophomore album, Ecstasy, is a step forward for the Cleveland-based urban contemporary singer. This 2002 release isn't perfect – some of the tracks are routine and pedestrian. But Ecstasy contains more gems than My Thoughts [...] For every minus that you can find on this release, there are three or four pluses." USA Today critic Steve Jones wrote that Ecstasy was picking up where Avant's " debut, My Thoughts, left off," blending sexy ballads with club jams. While he considered uptempo tracks like "Six in da Morning" and "What Do You Say" a "bit too derivative,” Jones found that the singer excelled on slow songs, shining on tracks such as "Thinkin’ About You" and the emotional "One Way Street" with Charlie Wilson.

== Track listing ==
All tracks are produced by Steve "Stone" Huff.

No.	Title	Writer(s)	Length
1.	"Call on Me"	Myron Avant; Steve Huff	4:08
2.	"What Do You Want" (featuring Cap1)	Avant; Huff; Leon Smith	4:09
3.	"Don't Say No, Just Say Yes"	Avant; Huff	4:36
4.	"Making Good Love"	Avant; Huff	4:34
5.	"Sorry"	Avant; Huff	4:35
6.	"No Limit"	Avant; Huff	4:01
7.	"Thinkin' About You"	Avant; Huff	4:28
8.	"Six in da Morning"	Avant; Huff; Sean Don	4:00
9.	"You Ain't Right"	Avant; Huff	4:14
10.	"One Way Street" (featuring Charlie Wilson)	Avant; Huff	3:41
11.	"Love School"	Avant; Huff	4:07
12.	"Jack & Jill"	Avant; Huff	3:52
13.	"Suicide"	Avant; Huff	4:11
14.	"Making Good Love (Remix)" (featuring Bone Thugs-N-Harmony)	Avant; Huff; Bone	4:04

== Charts ==
=== Weekly charts ===
Chart (2002)	Peak position
US Billboard 200	6
US Top R&B/Hip-Hop Albums (Billboard)	2

=== Year-end charts ===
Chart (2002)	Position
US Billboard 200	116
US Top R&B/Hip-Hop Albums (Billboard)	25

== Certifications ==
Region	Certification	Certified units/sales
United States (RIAA)	Gold	500,000^{^}
^{^} Shipments figures based on certification alone.
