= Face the Music (Avant album) =

Studio album by Avant
- Released: February 1, 2013
- Length: 46:34
- Label: Mo-B
- Producers: Avant (also exec.); Tim & Bob; Dre Hen; Kajun (also co-exec.); Tabetha Plummer (exec.); Jerry "Big Jay" Woodard (exec.)

Avant chronology
The Letter (2010)	Face the Music (2013)	The VIII (2015)

Singles from Face The Music
- 1. "You & I" Released: August 2012; 2. "More" Released: June 2013

Face the Music is the seventh studio album by American singer Avant. Released on February 1, 2013 in the United States, it marked his debut released on his own label Mo-B Entertainment. Distribution was overseen by Caroline Distribution and EMI Records. The album features collaborations with J'Lyn, Kriss "Kajun" Johnson and singer Keke Wyatt. As of August 2015, Face the Music has sold over 77,000 copies in the United States.

== Critical reception ==
Professional ratings
Review scores
Source	Rating
About.com	4/5 stars
AllMusic	3/5 stars

Andy Kellman from AllMusic rated the album three stars out of five. He wrote that Face the Music is "another set of sophisticated, adult-oriented R&B that occasionally veers into boilerplate belligerence without quite reaching "Break Ya Back" territory [...] Altogether, it's a pleasing, natural continuation, full of slow grooves that tend to be convincingly romantic."

== Singles ==
"You & I" featuring American R&B singer Keke Wyatt was released as the album's lead single in August, 2012. The song impacted urban radio in September, 2012. On December 1, 2012, the song peaked at number 46 on Billboard's Hot R&B/Hip-Hop Songs chart. The music video for "You & I" was released on Avant's YouTube channel on January 4, 2013. The song debuted on Billboard's Adult R&B Songs Chart at number 23 later rising to number 1 on March 2, 2013 in its twenty third week. The song spent 41 weeks in the top 20 on the Adult R&B Songs Chart before leaving the chart on July 6, 2013.

"More" was released as the album's second single in June 2013. The song peaked at number 16 on Billboard's Adult R&B Songs Chart on September 21, 2013. The song spent 23 weeks in the top 20 chart before leaving the Adult R&B Songs Chart on September 28, 2013.

== Commercial performance ==
In the United States, Face the Music debuted at number 40 on the Billboard 200, number 4 on the R&B Albums and at number 9 on the Top R&B/Hip-Hop Albums, selling 14,000 copies in the first week.

== Track listing ==
No.	Title	Writer(s)	Producer	Length
1.	"Toast to Love"	Myron Avant; Andre Henry; Kriss Johnson	Kajun; Avant^{[a]}; Dre Hen^{[a]}	3:55
2.	"80 in a 30" (featuring J'Lyn & Kajun)	Avant; Henry; Johnson	Kajun; Avant^{[a]}; Hen^{[a]}	3:44
3.	"You & I" (featuring Keke Wyatt)	Avant; Henry; Johnson	Kajun; Avant^{[a]}; Hen^{[a]}	3:54
4.	"More"	Avant; Henry; Johnson	Kajun; Avant^{[a]}; Hen^{[a]}	4:05
5.	"Excited"	Avant; Tim Kelley; Bob Robinson	Tim & Bob^{[a]}	4:03
6.	"Don't Know How"	Avant; Henry; Johnson	Kajun; Avant^{[a]}; Hen^{[a]}	4:17
7.	"Nobody's Business"	Avant; Henry; Johnson	Kajun; Avant^{[a]}; Hen^{[a]}	3:51
8.	"Best Friend"	Avant; Henry; Johnson	Kajun; Avant^{[a]}; Hen^{[a]}	4:04
9.	"Like You"	Avant; Kelley; Robinson	Tim & Bob	3:01
10.	"When Its Over"	Avant; Johnson	Kajun; Avant^{[a]}	4:06
11.	"No"	Avant; Henry; Johnson	Kajun; Avant^{[a]}; Hen^{[a]}	3:51
12.	"Gratitude"	Avant; Kelley; Robinson; Johnson	Tim & Bob	3:37

Notes

- ^{^[a]} denotes co-producer
- ^{^[b]} denotes vocals producer

== Credits and personnel ==
Album credits taken from Allmusic.

Performers and musicians

- Avant – Vocals, Background
- J'Lyn – Vocals (track 2)
- Kriss "Kajun" Johnson – Vocals (track 2)
- Keke Wyatt – Vocals, Background (track 7)

Technical personnel

- Avant – Executive Producer, Producer, Vocal Producer
- Andre "Dre Hen" Henry – Composer, Producer
- Kriss "Kajun" Johnson – Composer, Producer, Executive Producer, Vocal Producer
- Tabetha Plummer – Executive Producer
- Jerry Woodard – Executive Producer
- Tim & Bob – Composer, Producer
- Peter Mokran – Mixing Engineer
- Eric Weever – Mixing Assistant
- Shah Wonders – Design

== Charts ==
=== Weekly charts ===
Chart (2013)	Peak position
US Billboard 200	40
US Top R&B/Hip-Hop Albums (Billboard)	9

=== Year-end charts ===
Chart (2013)	Position
US Top R&B/Hip-Hop Albums (Billboard)	75

== Release history ==
List of release dates, showing region, formats and label
Region	Date	Format(s)	Label	Ref
United Kingdom	February 1, 2013	Digital download	Mo-B Entertainment; EMI	
United States	February 1, 2013	Digital download	Mo-B Entertainment; EMI	
United Kingdom	February 5, 2013	CD	Mo-B Entertainment; EMI	
United States	February 5, 2013	CD	Mo-B Entertainment; EMI	
