= Private Room =

2003 studio album by Avant

Studio album by Avant
- Released: December 9, 2003
- Genre: R&B
- Length: 62:30
- Label: Geffen; Magic Johnson
- Producer: Avant (exec.); Steve Huff (exec.); Eric Payton (exec.)

Avant chronology
Ecstasy (2002)	Private Room (2003)	Director (2006)

Singles from Private Room
- 1. "Read Your Mind" Released: October 14, 2003; 2. "Don't Take Your Love Away" Released: 2004; 3. "Wanna Be Close" Released: 2004

Private Room is the third studio album by American singer Avant. It was released by Geffen Records on December 9, 2003, in the United States. The album marked his debut release under the label following the absorbance of his previous label, MCA Records, in early 2003. Avant reunited with frequent collaborator Steve "Stone" Huff to work on the album, with additional production provided by Warryn Campbell. Upon its release, Private Room peaked at number four on the US Top R&B/Hip-Hop Albums and number 18 on the US Billboard 200. Its lead single "Read Your Mind" reached number 13 on the US Billboard Hot 100.

== Critical reception ==
Professional ratings
Review scores
Source	Rating
AllMusic	3/5 stars
Blender	1/5 stars
Vibe	2/5 stars

Alex Henderson from AllMusic rated the album three stars out of five. He wrote that "the same issues that weighed down Avant's previous two albums, rendering them good if uneven releases, continue to run unchecked for Private Room [...] So, once again, there's a handful of excellent contemporary R&B songs surrounded by too much material that's either decent or middling." Vibe's Angie Romero found that while "Avant’s tenor may go down like a nice glass of Merlot, but his overall sound is less than intoxicating. The nondescript midtempo backdrops stifle his vocal sensuality, while simplistic writing drags Private Room into the depths of banality."

== Track listing ==
No.	Title	Writer(s)	Producer(s)	Length
1.	"Private Room (Intro)"	Myron Avant; Steve Huff	Huff	1:03
2.	"AV"	Avant; Huff	Huff	3:58
3.	"Read Your Mind"	Avant; Huff	Huff	4:23
4.	"Heaven"	David Ritz; Harold Lilly; Marvin Gaye; Odell Brown; Warryn Campbell	Campbell; Lilly^{[a]}	3:57
5.	"Don't Take Your Love Away"	Avant; Huff	Huff	4:39
6.	"Have Some Fun"	Lilly; Campbell	Campbell; Lilly^{[a]}	3:37
7.	"Hooked"	Avant; Huff	Huff	3:59
8.	"Phone Sex (That's What's Up)"	Avant; Huff	Huff	5:02
9.	"Feast"	Avant; Huff	Huff	3:45
10.	"Seems to Be" (featuring Olivia)	Avant; Huff	Huff	4:02
11.	"You Got Me"	Avant; Huff; Bonnie Bramlett; Delaney Bramlett; Leon Russell; Huff	Huff	4:32
12.	"Wanna Be Close"	Avant; Huff	Huff	4:48
13.	"Everything About You"	Avant; Huff	Huff	3:59
14.	"You"	Avant; Huff	Huff	3:31
15.	"Read Your Mind (Part 2 The Remix)"	Avant; Huff; Gamble & Huff	Huff	3:56
16.	"Flickin'" (Bonus track)	Avant; Huff	Huff	4:02

Notes

- ^{^[a]} denotes co-producer

Samples

- "Heaven" contains interpolations of "Sexual Healing," written by Odell Brown Jr., Marvin Gaye, and David Ritz and performed by Gaye.
- "You Got Me" contains interpolations of "Superstar," written by Bonnie Bramlett, Delany Bramlett, and Leon Russell.
- "Read Your Mind (Part 2 The Remix)" contains interpolations of "Come Go with Me," written by Kenneth Gamble and Leon Huff.

== Charts ==
=== Weekly charts ===
Chart (2003)	Peak position
US Billboard 200	18
US Top R&B/Hip-Hop Albums (Billboard)	4

=== Year-end charts ===
Chart (2004)	Position
US Billboard 200	92
US Top R&B/Hip-Hop Albums (Billboard)	14

== Certifications ==
Region	Certification	Certified units/sales
United States (RIAA)	Gold	500,000^{^}
^{^} Shipments figures based on certification alone.
