= Noi (album) =

Studio album by Eros Ramazzotti
- Released: 13 November 2012
- Length: 51:36
- Language: Italian, Spanish
- Producer: Eros Ramazzotti, Luca Chiaravalli

Eros Ramazzotti chronology
21.00: Eros Live World Tour 2009/2010 (2010)	Noi (2012)	Eros 30 (2014)

Singles from Noi
- 1. "Un angelo disteso al sole" Released: 12 October 2012; 2. "Fino all'estasi" Released: 14 September 2013

Noi (English "We" or "Us"/Spanish: Somos) is the twelfth studio album by Italian singer-songwriter Eros Ramazzotti released on 13 November 2012 by Universal Music. The album, produced by Ramazzotti and Luca Chiaravalli, was preceded by the single "Un angelo disteso al sole", released on 12 October 2012.

== Background ==
On 21 July 2011, it was announced that Eros Ramazzotti had left Sony Music, signing a recording contract with Universal. A few days later, Ramazzotti's manager Giancarlo Giannini announced that he had planned to start working on new material between September and October 2011, in order to release a new album in November 2012. However, in January 2012 Ramazzotti split with his manager, replacing him with Michele Torpedine. This led to speculations that the release date of the album was postponed to January 2013, but Universal Music denied it, confirming the release of a new studio set in 2012.

In August 2012, it was announced that the new album would be released on 13 November 2012, while the album title was revealed on 4 September 2012. The artwork was published on 11 October 2012 through Ramazzotti's official Google+ account. Two days later, the first single from the album, titled "Un angelo disteso al sole", was internationally released to radios as well as a digital download. Details about the remaining tracks included on the album and the guest artists appearing on it were revealed on 15 October 2012, when the album's track list was officially confirmed.

The album features guest appearances by former Pussycat Dolls' lead singer Nicole Scherzinger, as well as Italian operatic pop trio Il Volo, Belgian band Hooverphonic and Italian rap group Club Dogo. The track "Io sono te" also features a monologue by Giancarlo Giannini on the Italian edition of the album and by Andy García on the international release. During a press conference following the release of the album, Ramazzotti revealed that he also wanted to record songs with Eminem, Madonna and Jennifer Lopez, but they all turned down his proposal. On 12 June 2013, a music video for "Fino all'estasi" featuring Scherzinger premiered on Ramazzotti's VEVO account.

== Track listing ==
Noi – Standard edition
No.	Title	Lyrics	Music	Length
1.	"Noi"	Eros Ramazzotti; Luca Chiaravalli; Saverio Grandi	Ramazzotti; Chiaravalli; Grandi	3:53
2.	"Un angelo disteso al sole"	Ramazzotti; Chiaravalli; Grandi	Ramazzotti; Chiaravalli; Grandi	3:24
3.	"Questa nostra stagione"	Ramazzotti; Chiaravalli; Grandi	Ramazzotti; Chiaravalli; Grandi	3:37
4.	"Io sono te (I Am You)" (featuring Giancarlo Giannini)	Ramazzotti; Andrea Bonomo; Grandi	Ramazzotti; Chiaravalli; Pagin; Grandi	3:32
5.	"Fino all'estasi" (featuring Nicole Scherzinger)	Ramazzotti; Chiaravalli; Anthony Preston; Carlo Rizoli; Grandi	Ramazzotti; Chiaravalli; Preston	3:45
6.	"Abbracciami"	Ramazzotti; Chiaravalli; Grandi	Ramazzotti; Chiaravalli; Grandi	3:16
7.	"Balla solo la tua musica"	Ramazzotti; Chiaravalli; Grandi	Ramazzotti; Chiaravalli; Grandi	3:50
8.	"Infinitamente"	Ramazzotti; Andrea Bonomo; Grandi	Ramazzotti; Chiaravalli	3:47
9.	"Polaroid"	Ramazzotti; Chiaravalli; Grandi	Ramazzotti; Chiaravalli; Grandi	3:33
10.	"Sotto lo stesso cielo"	Ramazzotti; Grandi; Chiaravalli; Bonomo	Ramazzotti; Chiaravalli; Grandi	3:40
11.	"Una tempesta di stelle"	Ramazzotti; Grandi	Ramazzotti; Chiaravalli	3:51
12.	"Testa o cuore" (featuring Club Dogo)	Ramazzotti; Bonomo; Grandi; Cosimo Fini	Ramazzotti; Chiaravalli	4:05
13.	"Così" (featuring Il Volo)	Ramazzotti; Chiaravalli	Ramazzotti; Chiaravalli	4:17
14.	"Solamente uno" (featuring Hooverphonic)	Ramazzotti; Bonomo; Chiaravalli; Alex Callier	Ramazzotti; Chiaravalli; Callier	3:06
Total length:				51:35

Somos – Standard edition
No.	Title	Lyrics	Music	Length
1.	"Ahora Somos"	Ramazzotti; Chiaravalli; Grandi; Mila Ortiz Martin	Ramazzotti; Chiaravalli; Grandi	3:53
2.	"Un Ángel Como el Sol tú Eres"	Ramazzotti; Chiaravalli; Grandi; Martin	Ramazzotti; Chiaravalli; Grandi	3:24
3.	"Este Tiempo Tan Nuestro"	Ramazzotti; Chiaravalli; Grandi; Martin	Ramazzotti; Chiaravalli; Grandi	3:37
4.	"Yo Soy Tú" (featuring Andy García)	Ramazzotti; Bonomo; Grandi; Martin	Ramazzotti; Chiaravalli; Pagin	3:32
5.	"Hasta El Éxtasis" (featuring Nicole Scherzinger)	Ramazzotti; Chiaravalli; Preston; Rizoli; Grandi; Martin	Ramazzotti; Chiaravalli; Preston	3:45
6.	"Abrázame"	Ramazzotti; Chiaravalli; Grandi; Martin	Ramazzotti; Chiaravalli; Grandi	3:16
7.	"Baila Solo con Tu Música"	Ramazzotti; Chiaravalli; Grandi; Martin	Ramazzotti; Chiaravalli; Grandi	3:50
8.	"Amigo Mío"	Ramazzotti; Bonomo; Grandi; Martin	Ramazzotti; Chiaravalli	3:47
9.	"Dos Minutos"	Ramazzotti; Chiaravalli; Grandi; Martin	Ramazzotti; Chiaravalli; Grandi	3:33
10.	"Bajo el Mismo Cielo"	Ramazzotti; Grandi; Chiaravalli; Bonomo; Martin	Ramazzotti; Chiaravalli; Grandi	3:40
11.	"Una Tormenta de Estrellas"	Ramazzotti; Grandi; Martin	Ramazzotti; Chiaravalli	3:51
12.	"Testa o Cuore" (featuring Club Dogo)	Ramazzotti; Bonomo; Grandi; Fini	Ramazzotti; Chiaravalli	4:05
13.	"Así" (featuring Il Volo)	Ramazzotti; Chiaravalli; Martin	Ramazzotti; Chiaravalli	4:17
14.	"Uno Más" (featuring Hooverphonic)	Ramazzotti; Bonomo; Chiaravalli; Callier; Martin	Ramazzotti; Chiaravalli; Callier	3:06
Total length:				51:35

== Musicians ==
- Eros Ramazzotti – vocals, guitar, backing vocals, electric guitar, acoustic guitar, keyboards, piano
- Tim Pierce – guitar, acoustic guitar, electric guitar
- Luca Chiaravalli – guitar, electric guitar, acoustic guitar, keyboards, piano, strings, backing vocals
- Saverio Grandi – guitar, acoustic guitar, keyboards, piano, backing vocals
- Giorgio Secco – guitar, acoustic guitar, electric guitar
- Biagio Sturiale – guitar, acoustic guitar, electric guitar
- Reggie Hamilton – bass
- Paolo Costa – bass
- Marco Barusso – bass, guitar, electric guitar
- Alex Callier – bass, guitar, electric guitar, backing vocals
- Josh Freese – drums
- Lele Melotti – drums
- Gary Novak – drums
- Luca Scarpa – keyboards, piano, organ
- Serafino Tedesi – violin
- Dario Cecchini – flute, baritone saxophone
- Massimo Zanotti – trombone, trumpet
- Gabriele Bolognesi – alto saxophone, tenor saxophone
- Renato Di Bonito – backing vocals
- Gianluigi Fazio – backing vocals
- Roberta Granà – backing vocals
- William Moretti – backing vocals
- Lara Pagin – backing vocals
- Claudio Placanica – backing vocals
- Cristina Valenti – backing vocals

== Charts ==
=== Weekly charts ===
Weekly chart performance for Noi
Chart (2012–13)	Peak position
Austrian Albums (Ö3 Austria)	2
Belgian Albums (Ultratop Flanders)	3
Belgian Albums (Ultratop Wallonia)	3
Croatian Albums (HDU)	3
Czech Albums (ČNS IFPI)	12
Danish Albums (Hitlisten)	27
Dutch Albums (Album Top 100)	14
French Albums (SNEP)	22
German Albums (Offizielle Top 100)	7
Greek International Albums (IFPI Greece)	12
Hungarian Albums (MAHASZ)	14
Italian Albums (FIMI)	1
Mexican Albums (Top 100 Mexico)	33
Polish Albums (ZPAV)	40
Spanish Albums (Promusicae)	6
Swedish Albums (Sverigetopplistan)	9
Swiss Albums (Schweizer Hitparade)	2
US Latin Pop Albums (Billboard)	12
US Top Latin Albums (Billboard)	40

=== Year-end charts ===
2012 year-end chart performance for Noi
Chart (2012)	Position
Austrian Albums (Ö3 Austria)	65
Belgian Albums (Ultratop Wallonia)	25
Hungarian Albums (MAHASZ)	75
Italian Albums (FIMI)	3
Spanish Albums (Promusicae)	42
Swiss Albums (Schweizer Hitparade)	29

2013 year-end chart performance for Noi
Chart (2013)	Position
Spanish Albums (Promusicae)	38

== Certifications ==
Region	Certification	Certified units/sales
Austria (IFPI Austria)	Gold	10,000^{*}
Belgium (BRMA)	Gold	15,000^{*}
Germany (BVMI)	Gold	100,000^{^}
Hungary (MAHASZ)	Gold	3,000^{^}
Italy (FIMI)	5× Platinum	300,000^{*}
Spain (Promusicae)	Gold	20,000^{^}
Switzerland (IFPI Switzerland)	Gold	10,000^{^}
Venezuela (APROFON)	Gold	5,000^{x}
^{*} Sales figures based on certification alone.^{^} Shipments figures based on certification alone.

== Release history ==
Region	Date	Version	Label
Italy	13 November 2012	Noi	Universal
Spain	13 November 2012	Somos	Universal
Germany	16 November 2012	Noi	Universal
France	26 November 2012	Noi	Universal
