= Read Your Mind =

2003 single by Avant

Single by Avant

from the album Private Room
- Released: October 14, 2003
- Recorded: 2003
- Genre: R&B
- Length: 4:23
- Label: Geffen Records
- Songwriters: Avant, Steve Huff
- Producer: Stizzle

Avant singles chronology
"You Ain't Right" (2002)	"Read Your Mind" (2003)	"Don't Take Your Love Away" (2004)

"Read Your Mind" is a song by American recording artist Avant. It was released for as the lead single from album Private Room.

== Track listing ==
- CD Single
1. Read Your Mind (Radio Edit) — 3:59
2. Read Your Mind (Album Version) — 4:14
3. Read Your Mind (Instrumental) — 4:24
4. Read Your Mind (A Cappella) — 5:00
- Vinyl (Remix)
1. Read Your Mind (Extended Version) (featuring Snoop Dogg) — 5:11
2. Read Your Mind (Instrumental) — 4:24

== Samples ==
In 2017, Jacquees sampled the song in his song "B.E.D.".

== Charts ==
=== Weekly charts ===
Chart (2003–2004)	Peak position
US Billboard Hot 100	13
US Hot R&B/Hip-Hop Songs (Billboard)	5
US Rhythmic Airplay (Billboard)	27

=== Year-end charts ===
Chart (2003)	Position
US Hot R&B/Hip-Hop Songs (Billboard)	77
Chart (2004)	Position
US Billboard Hot 100	64
US Hot R&B/Hip-Hop Songs (Billboard)	21
