= The Letter (Avant album) =

Studio album by Avant
- Released: December 21, 2010
- Genre: R&B
- Length: 40:31
- Label: Verve Forecast
- Producers: The Avila Brothers; Berris Bolton; Coop the Truth; Mike City; Kajun; Marshall Leathers; The Pentagon

Avant chronology
Avant (2008)	The Letter (2010)	Face the Music (2013)

Singles from The Letter
- 1. "Kiss Goodbye" Released: September 21, 2010; 2. "Your Body is the Business" Released: March 2011; 3. "Graduated" Released: June 13, 2011

The Letter is the sixth studio album by American singer Avant. It was released by Verve Forecast Records on December 21, 2010 in the United States. The singer worked with the Avila Brothers, Mike City, duo the Pentagon, and others on The Letter which debuted and peaked at number 119 on the US Billboard 200, becoming his lowest-charting album to date. It produced three singles, including "Kiss Goodbye", "Your Body Is the Business" and "Graduated".

== Background ==
Speaking in January 2011 to noted UK R&B writer Pete Lewis, assistant editor of Blues & Soul, Avant described his reasons for titling the album The Letter as being because it represents "a letter from me to my fans, to tell them what's going on in my life, what's going through my head, and my struggles as a man."

== Critical reception ==
Professional ratings
Review scores
Source	Rating
About.com	3.5/5 stars
AllMusic	2.5/5 stars

Andy Kellman from AllMusic rated the album two and a half stars out of five. He wrote that "to put it lightly, none of these songs deserve placement in a best-of-Avant playlist. Otherwise, The Letter offers another ballad-heavy round of smooth, sophisticated, and occasionally raunchy R&B songs [...] for the thirty and up crowd. It's not one of the singer's best albums, but those who can wade through the miscues will have an EP's worth of solid Avant."

== Track listing ==
No.	Title	Writer(s)	Producer	Length
1.	"Graduated"	Myron Avant; Cooper McGill	Coop the Truth	3:25
2.	"Hot 16"	Myron Avant; Eric Dawkins; Antonio Dixon	The Pentagon	3:55
3.	"Kiss Goodbye"	Avant; Dawkins; Dixon	The Pentagon	3:48
4.	"Had Enough"	Avant; Kriss Johnson	Kajun	3:38
5.	"Body Police"	Johnson; Issiah Avila, Jr.; Bobby Ross Avila	Kajun; The Avila Brothers	4:03
6.	"Nightlife"	Avant; Michael Flowers	Mike City	3:05
7.	"Your Body Is the Business"	Avant; Berris Bolton; A. Crawford; Aaron Sledge	Bolton	3:49
8.	"Wake Up"	Avant; Dawkins; Dixon; Damon Thomas	The Pentagon	3:50
9.	"That Dude"	Avant; Leathers	Marshall Leathers	3:33
10.	"Where Did We Go?"	Avant; Dawkins; Dixon	The Pentagon	3:18
11.	"Walking on Water"	Avant; Dawkins; Dixon; Patrick Smith; Thomas	The Pentagon	4:02
12.	"Africa" (bonus track)	David Paich; Jeff Porcaro	The Pentagon	4:24

iTunes edition
No.	Title	Writer(s)	Producer(s)	Length
12.	"Never Give Up the Fight"	Avant; Brian Culbertson	Culbertson	4:28

== Charts ==
Chart (2010)	Peak position
US Billboard 200	114
US Top R&B/Hip-Hop Albums (Billboard)	19
