= My Thoughts =

Studio album by Avant
- Released: May 9, 2000
- Length: 50:54
- Label: MCA; Magic Johnson
- Producer: Steve "Stone" Huff

Avant chronology
My Thoughts (2000)	Ecstasy (2002)

Singles from My Thoughts
- 1. "Separated" Released: 2000; 2. "My First Love" Released: 2000; 3. "This Time" Released: 2001

My Thoughts is the debut studio album by American singer Avant. It was released on May 9, 2000, by MCA Records and Magic Johnson's Magic Johnson Music. Avant worked with Steve "Stone" Huff on the majority of the album. It debuted at number 45 on the US Billboard 200 and number 8 on the Top R&B Albums, selling 41,675 copies in the opening week. Certified platinum by the Recording Industry Association of America (RIAA), My Thoughts sold more than one million copies in the United States and received generally mixed to positive reviews by critics. The album spawned three singles that became top ten hits; including "Separated", "My First Love" featuring KeKe Wyatt, a cover to its classic René & Angela hit, and "This Time". Both songs, "My First Love" and "This Time", were certified platinum by the Recording Industry Association of America (RIAA).

== Critical reception ==
Professional ratings
Review scores
Source	Rating
AllMusic	3/5 stars
PopMatters	7.2/10
USA Today	2.5/4 stars

Alex Henderson from AllMusic rated the album three out of five stars and called My Thoughts "a competent, if uneven, effort," with much of the material being "routine urban contemporary fare." He found that "My Thoughts isn't mind-blowing, but it's decent more often than not and lets us know that Avant has potential." USA Today critic Steve Jones noted that Avant's debut focuses on "relationships," highlighting "Separated" as a story of a painful breakup, praising his performance on "grittier, reality-based tracks" like "Let's Make a Deal" and "This Time," and calling his duet with Ketara Wyatt on "My First Love" a standout, while observing that some ballads "don't hang in your ear long," yet overall it’s "a promising debut."

== Track listing ==
All tracks are produced by Steve "Stone" Huff.

No.	Title	Writer(s)	Length
1.	"Separated"	Myron Avant; Steve Huff	4:15
2.	"Reaction"	Avant; Chris Kelly; Huff	3:52
3.	"Get Away"	Kelly; Huff	5:28
4.	"Let's Make a Deal"	Avant; Huff	3:58
5.	"Happy"	Avant; Huff	5:21
6.	"My First Love" (featuring Keke Wyatt)	Angela Winbush; René Moore	4:28
7.	"I Wanna Know"	Avant; Bruce Alan; Huff	5:26
8.	"Serious"	Avant; Marinna Teal; Huff	4:02
9.	"Destiny"	Avant; Huff	3:50
10.	"Ooh Aah"	Avant; Huff	4:13
11.	"This Time"	Avant; Huff	4:00
12.	"Why"	Avant; Huff	5:37

Samples

- "Reaction" contains elements from "Wonderful", performed by Isaac Hayes.

== Charts ==
=== Weekly charts ===
Chart (2000)	Peak position
US Billboard 200	45
US Top R&B/Hip-Hop Albums (Billboard)	6

=== Year-end charts ===
Chart (2000)	Position
US Billboard 200	149
US Top R&B/Hip-Hop Albums (Billboard)	38
Chart (2001)	Position
US Top R&B/Hip-Hop Albums (Billboard)	89

== Certifications ==
Region	Certification	Certified units/sales
United States (RIAA)	Platinum	1,000,000^{^}
^{^} Shipments figures based on certification alone.
