= Bruce Boniface =

Boniface
- Born: Bruce Boniface; 5 June 1981 (age 45); Seychelles
- Origin: London, England
- Genres: Pop, hip hop
- Occupation: Singer-songwriter
- Years active: 2002–present
- Label: Capitol Records/Virgin Records/2BAD Entertainment (2006–present)
- Website: www.bruceboniface.com

Bruce Boniface, better known by his surname, Boniface (born 5 June 1981) is a singer-songwriter, vocal arranger and record producer best known for his Top 40 hit "Cheeky", which peaked at number 25 on the UK Singles Chart. The track remained in the chart for three weeks.

== Biography ==
Boniface was born in Seychelles and started his music career at the age of 3. He had one Christmas and two studio albums by the age of 5. Boniface and his family moved to England when he was 6 years old. After a short break at age 13, Boniface resumed developing his musical skills and dancing techniques. Among his influences are Michael Jackson, Boyz II Men, Babyface, Lionel Richie and Usher.

In 2002, Boniface reached number 25 on the UK Singles Chart with the single "Cheeky". "Cheeky" also debuted at number two on the UK Hip Hop & R&B Singles Chart, staying on the chart for ten weeks. He later toured with Destiny's Child in the UK and across Europe in 2002 and 2003.

He was signed to Virgin Records in July 2006.

== Discography ==
List of singles released as lead artist, with selected chart positions, showing year released and originating album
Title	Year	Peak chart positions	Album
Title	Year	UK	Album
"Cheeky" (featuring Lady Luck)	2002	25	Non-album singles
"Maybe She's Sorry"	2008	-	Non-album singles
