= Rise (René & Angela album) =

Studio album by René & Angela
- Released: April 29, 1983
- Recorded: February–April 1983
- Genres: Funk, soul, R&B, post-disco
- Label: Capitol
- Producers: Bobby Watson, René & Angela

René & Angela chronology
Wall to Wall (1981)	Rise (1983)	Street Called Desire (1985)

Professional ratings
Review scores
Source	Rating
AllMusic	3/5 stars

Rise is the third album by American singing duo René & Angela, released on April 29, 1983. It was their last release for Capitol Records. The album includes the R&B ballad "My First Love", which was later covered by Avant.

== Track listing ==
Written by Rene & Angela.

1. "Rise" – 3:57
2. "Keep Runnin'" – 5:16
3. "My First Love" – 5:07
4. "Bangin' the Boogie" – 5:01
5. "When It Comes to Love" – 5:01
6. "Wait Until Tonight" – 4:20
7. "Can't Give You Up" – 4:01
8. "Take Me to the Limit" – 4:16

== Personnel ==
- Angela Winbush – Lead & Backing Vocal, Keyboards
- René Moore – Keyboards, Bass, Lead & Backing Vocal
- Jeff Lorber, Ian Underwood – Keyboards
- Gregory Moore, Michael McGloiry, Tony Maiden, George Johnson, Mario Henderson – Guitars
- Louis Johnson, Bobby Watson – Bass
- Andre Fischer, Jeff Porcaro, John Robinson, Ollie Brown – Drums
- Paulinho Da Costa – Percussion

== Charts ==
=== Albums ===
Chart (1983)	Peak position
U.S. Billboard Top Black Albums	33

=== Singles ===
Year	Single	Chart position
Year	Single	US Dance
1983	"Banging the Boogie"	33
1983	"My First Love"	12
