= Nicole Scherzinger 2012 =

2012 concert tour

- Tour by Nicole Scherzinger
- Location: Belgium; Ireland; Northern Ireland; England
- Associated album: Killer Love
- Start date: February 13, 2012
- End date: February 23, 2012
- No. of shows: 6
- Supporting act: Mindless Behaviour
- Producer: Live Nation
- Attendance: 3,804 (Note: Total attendance and revenue reflect figures from the two shows that were submitted to Billboard Boxscore.)
- Box office: $179,865

Nicole Scherzinger concert chronology
- N/A; Nicole Scherzinger 2012 2012; An Evening with Nicole Scherzinger 2025

The Nicole Scherzinger 2012 (Note: The tour is commonly referred to as the Killer Love Tour; the official VIP ticketing website listed the event as "Nicole Scherzinger 2012".) tour was the first headlining concert tour by American singer Nicole Scherzinger. It was launched in support of her debut studio album, Killer Love (2011). The tour was announced in late 2011 with a run of six dates across Europe. It began on February 13, 2012, in Brussels, Belgium and concluded on February 23, 2012, in Birmingham, England. The production featured a stripped‑back stage that emphasized dramatic lighting over elaborate sets or video screens. The set list centered on tracks from Killer Love and several Pussycat Dolls songs, backed by a four‑piece band and four female dancers, forming a 90‑minute, high‑energy showcase.

Reviews were mixed, with some critics praising Scherzinger's vocal power and stamina, while others noted the show's reliance on group nostalgia and questioned her solo material, characterizing the tour as an energetic, star‑driven production that highlighted her stage presence as a solo headliner.

== Background ==
Scherzinger released her debut studio album, Killer Love, in March 2011. She described the material on the album as being crafted for “full, live performance,” explaining that its uptempo tracks carried an energy designed for the stage rather than just studio production. In October 2011, Scherzinger announced her first-ever U.K. and Ireland tour set for February 2012. The tour would start in Belfast, Northern Ireland, followed by Dublin, Ireland, and three cities in England: London, Manchester, and Birmingham. Tickets went on sale on October 28, 2012. This date coincided with the release of her fifth single, "Try With Me," which was released as the lead single for the re-release of the album which included three additional new songs. In November 2011, a Brussels show was added for February 13, 2012. Live Nation served as the tour's promoter. The following month, American boy band Mindless Behaviour were announced as the supporting act for all tour dates.

During an interview with the Belfast Telegraph, Scherzinger expressed great excitement about her first solo tour, saying, "I'm so excited about this tour," and shared that she was preparing extensively by researching and crafting a well-rounded show with a varied set list including singing, dancing, a Pussycat Dolls set, a stripped-back acoustic set, and her own songs. She acknowledged it would feel a bit strange without the group but assured she would bring their energy on stage alongside a live band and dancers. She emphasized her rigorous physical preparation to ensure she could perform energetically for a full hour and a half, promising fans a "brilliant night out." She reiterated that her focus was on the music rather than sex appeal, highlighting her desire for fans to connect with her artistry. MUZU.TV ran a competition which gave fans the chance to meet Scherzinger backstage on one of the tour dates.

== Staging and synopsis ==
The production featured a stripped-back stage design, with a simple backdrop featuring Scherzinger's name and grey voile drapes, eschewing elaborate sets or video elements. This approach placed emphasis on lighting to create atmosphere and drama, supporting Scherzinger's performance style without the need of large-scale production elements. With limited rehearsal time, the role of lighting design became especially important. Lighting designer Scott Warner, developed a lighting concept through his company Karate Pinky Visual Design. He employed a combination of the latest Robe lighting fixtures supplied by RM Lighting. Warner's design mixed theatrical and rock ‘n’ roll elements, focusing on contrasts, shadows, silhouettes, and bold colors.

The show was described as a "90‑minute arena‑sized extravaganza" whose set list drew primarily from, Killer Love, alongside a selection of Pussycat Dolls hits. Across the concert, she delivered her lyrics "like a cross between Bonnie Tyler and Cher,” and executed fast-paced routines compared to Janet Jackson's Rhythm Nation 1814. Each performance was backed by a four‑piece band and four female dancers. Scherzinger opened the show by entering center stage atop a flight of stairs and delivered performances of "Club Banger Nation", "Poison", and, "Killer Love". She then changed to a "sparkly black top" and sat on a stool to perform ballads such as "Baby Love", "Pretty", and "You Will Be Loved", which incorporated Lil Wayne's "How to Love". She proceeds with a Pussycat Dolls medley starting off with "Buttons" and "Jai Ho! (You Are My Destiny)" which evoked their respective musical influences. The medley continued with "Wait a Minute", "Hush Hush; Hush Hush", and "I Hate This Part". "Stickwitu" prompted "a mass sing-a-long" and concluded with "When I Grow Up". The "energetic" closing section included "Wet", "Try with Me", "Right There", and the Pussycat Dolls' "Don't Cha". The concert ends with "Don't Hold Your Breath".

== Reception ==
While reviewing the Belfast show, Stacey Heaney of the Ulster Star wrote that Scherzinger delivered a show that proved her talent as both a singer and performer. The reviewer commended her strong vocals and energetic choreography, highlighting her ability to transition seamlessly between upbeat pop songs and emotional ballads. Abe Tarrush of the GoldenPlec who saw the Dublin show agreed, writing that Scherzinger had "crossed the group-to-solo transition well," praising her energy and professionalism. Tarrush highlighted her powerful vocal range and "classical tone," noting that her strong, balanced vibrato showcased a side of her talent not always evident in the Pussycat Dolls’ material. They also commended the balance between high-energy numbers and the softer moments. The review concluded that Scherzinger's show had established "a definite niche for her as a solo performer" and demonstrated her ability to captivate an audience on her own. The Belfast Telegraph's Andrew Johnston positively wrote that Scherzinger proves "the next time she tours, she'll be back in the big rooms." Johnston highlights her "piercing howl" and strong stage presence.

In a more mixed reception, Lisa Verrico of The Times described the London show "a flashy, high‑energy pop spectacle" that relies on "celebrity status more than her songs," praising her stamina and ability to "join in furiously paced routines" while singing live. However, it criticizes the sound as "so over-amplified that it was often painful" and describes the Pussycat Dolls segment and costume‑change breaks as "more visual and sensual than artistic." Similarly, The Guardian's Caroline Sullivan was less impressed, noting Scherzinger's vocal power and dance skills but describing the set as overly reliant on Pussycat Dolls material and forgettable solo songs, resulting in a polished but characterless performance. Sullivan concluded that the concert fell short of establishing a unique solo identity, noting that energy alone could not replace the elusive "X factor" required to truly captivate an audience.

== Tour dates ==
List of 2012 concerts
Date (2012)	City	Country	Venue	Opening act	Revenue	Attendance
February 13	Brussels	Belgium	Ancienne Belgique	Mindless Behaviour	—N/a	—N/a
February 15	Belfast	Northern Ireland	Waterfront Hall	Mindless Behaviour	$109,058	2,213 / 2,213
February 16	Dublin	Ireland	Olympia Theatre	Mindless Behaviour	$70,807	1,591 / 1,591
February 19	London	England	Hammersmith Apollo	Mindless Behaviour	—N/a	—N/a
February 22	Manchester	England	O_{2} Apollo Manchester	Mindless Behaviour	—N/a	—N/a
February 23	Birmingham	England	O_{2} Academy Birmingham	Mindless Behaviour	—N/a	—N/a
Total					$179,865	3,804 / 3,804 (100%)
