= Try with Me =

Single by Nicole Scherzinger

from the album Killer Love
- Released: October 28, 2011
- Recorded: 2011
- Studio: Soulpower Studios, Los Angeles
- Genre: Pop; EDM
- Length: 3:56
- Label: Interscope
- Songwriters: Carsten "Soulshock" Schack; Sean Hurley; Olivia Nervo; Miriam Nervo
- Producer: Soulshock

Nicole Scherzinger singles chronology
"Wet" (2011)	"Try with Me" (2011)	"Boomerang" (2013)

Music video
- "Try with Me" on YouTube

"Try with Me" is a song recorded by American singer Nicole Scherzinger, taken from the re-release of her debut studio album, Killer Love (2011). The song was produced by Carsten "Soulshack" Schack, and written by Schack, Sean Hurley and the twins Olivia and Miriam Nervo. "Try with Me" was released as the first single from the re-release and the fifth and final single overall both releases. The song starts as a slow power ballad before erupting into an upbeat dance track. Lyrically the song is about heartache and heartbreak.

"Try with Me" received mainly positive reviews from critics who praised the song's production and Scherzinger's vocals. An accompanying music video directed by Aaron Platt & Joseph Toman was filmed in Xilitla, Mexico which portrays Scherzinger dancing, singing and emoting throughout the video. Scherzinger performed "Try with Me" in a series of live appearances such as television shows The X Factor and This Morning. In addition Scherzinger performed "Try with Me" at the 2011 Royal Variety Performance, in the presence of Princess Anne.

== Background and composition ==
Following the release of her debut studio album Killer Love (2011) and its four singles—including the number one UK single "Don't Hold Your Breath"— Scherzinger was preparing a US version of Killer Love with an alternate track listing, which would include "a mixture of strong dance anthems, urban twists and uplifting songs." On October 12, 2011, a 30-second snippet of a song titled "Try With Me" leaked online, with Digital Spy revealing that the song would be Scherzinger's next single. On October 17, 2011, Scherzinger confirmed that "Try With Me" was being released as a single on October 30, 2011, and that it would be included on the re-release of Killer Love along with "Trust Me I Lie", "Tomorrow Never Dies" and the official remix of "Right There" featuring 50 Cent. "Try with Me" was written by Carsten Schack, Sean Hurley, Olivia Nervo, Miriam Nervo and produced by Soulshock and Hurley. According to the press release, the song showcases Scherzinger's vocals, "by stripping them bare in a slow, melodic beginning which builds to a powerful crescendo as the dance beat drops," while Amy Sciaretto of PopCrush described its composition saying that it "starts out soft and slow and builds up to a beat-driven breakdown."

== Critical reception ==
The song was generally received positively from music critics. Pop Justice praised the song, based just on its demo. "We like this. It has a slight whiff of 'bounced around between the A&R inboxes of A-List global songstresses of the world until eventually ending up on a Nicole Scherzinger reissue' about it but there's lots to love. We particularly like the line that sounds like 'why does it feel like a cow?'." The website listed the song as the fourth best song from Scherzinger. Brad Stern of MTV Buzworthy praised the song for its production. "'Try with Me' is a gorgeous combination of pulsating synthesizers and slammin' vocals, and if she times this one right, there's no way Scherzy can't claw her way back to the top overseas." Meena Rupani of DesiHits complimented the "amazing" vocals of Scherzinger.

== Chart performance ==
"Try with Me" made its first chart appearance in Ireland on November 30, 2011, where it debuted and peaked at number 29. In the UK "Try with Me" debuted and peaked at number eighteen selling 21,315 copies. It's the only single from the album, along with Wet, that didn't reach the top-ten. "Try With Me" only spent 3 weeks on the chart, becoming her fastest single to leave the UK charts.

== Music video ==
The accompanying music video for "Try with Me" was shot in Xilitla, San Luis Potosí, Mexico on October 3, 2011 by Aaron Platt and Joseph Toman, while the choreography was handled by Brian Friedman. The flight to Mexico was followed with a five-hour drive to the rainforest. Scherzinger wears a cream chiffon couture gown designed by Anne Barge, while towards the end of the video she wears a Claire Pettibone dress teamed up with handmade cuffs by Christina Makowsky. The music video was premiered on MSN Music UK on October 18, 2011.

In the video, Scherzinger is romping in the jungle, playing a moss-covered piano while wearing a white sheath and surrounded by the lush shrubbery of nature and a babbling waterfall. Throughout the entirety of the video, she is singing, dancing and emoting.

== Live performances ==
"Try with Me" was performed for the first time at the live on the eighth season of The X Factor on October 30, 2011. Scherzinger opened the performance singing the slow part of the song while seated on a high stage, surrounded by smoke. As the song picked up pace, she stood up and started dancing. Amy Sciarretto from PopCrush wrote that "the overall performance was drenched in mystique and drama." During the performance she wore black lace gown while she was barefoot. Sciarretto commented: "Her performance spoke volumes to ‘X Factor’ hopefuls: this could all be yours one day!" On November 4, 2011 Scherzinger performed the song on ITV's show This Morning using some pre-recorded vocals. Elan Gorgan of Softpedia wrote, "her performance was live and lived up to her reputation as a solid performer." Scherzinger performed the song at the 2011 Royal Variety Performance held at The Lowry, in Salford Quays, Greater Manchester, which was attended by Princess Anne.

== Track listing ==
Digital Download

1. "Try With Me" – 3:56

== Credits and personnel ==
Credits adapted from the liner notes of Killer Love.

Management

- Published by C Schack: Notting Hill Music Inc. (BMI) / Notting Hill Music (UK) Ltd (PRS)/ Full of Soul Music (BMI), S. Hurley: Dos Duettes Music (ASCAP), O. Nervo: PRS (ASCAP), M. Nervo: PRS (ASCAP)
- Recorded and mixed at Soulpower Studios (Los Angeles, California).
- Mixed at Larrabee Studios (Universal City, California).

Personnel

- Cory Enemy – additional keyboards
- Chris Galland – engineering, mixing assistant
- Sean Hurley – songwriting, instruments
- Eric Madrid – engineering, mixing assistant
- Manny Marroquin – mixing
- Olivia Nervo –songwriting
- Miriam Nervo –songwriting
- Soulshock – songwriting, production, instruments, mixing

== Charts ==
Chart (2011)	Peak position
Ireland (IRMA)	29
Scotland Singles (Official Charts)	13
Slovakia Airplay (ČNS IFPI)	19
UK Singles (Official Charts)	18

== Release history ==
Country	Date	Format	Label	Ref
Ireland	October 28, 2011	Digital download	Universal Music Group	
United Kingdom	October 30, 2011	Digital download	Polydor Records	
