= Scott Warner =

Scott Warner may refer to:

- Scott Warner (lighting designer), American lighting designer
- Scott Warner (footballer) (born 1983), retired English footballer
- Scott Warner (tennis) (born 1965), American former tennis player
