= An Evening with Nicole Scherzinger =

2025 concert series headlined by Nicole Scherzinger

- Transcontinental concert by Nicole Scherzinger
- Location: London; New York City; Los Angeles
- Start date: October 6, 2025 (UK)
- End date: October 30, 2025 (USA)
- No. of shows: 3

Nicole Scherzinger concert chronology
- Nicole Scherzinger 2012 (2012); An Evening with Nicole Scherzinger (2025)

An Evening with Nicole Scherzinger is a concert series headlined by American singer and actress Nicole Scherzinger. The series marks Scherzinger's debut as a solo live performer at major venues, including London's Royal Albert Hall, Carnegie Hall in New York City, and the Walt Disney Concert Hall in Los Angeles in October 2025. The event blends musical theater and jazz standards with reimagined versions of The Pussycat Dolls' songs. The performances premiered following Scherzinger's acclaimed role as Norma Desmond in Jamie Lloyd's 2023 West End revival of Sunset Boulevard, which garnered widespread critical praise and industry awards.

== Background ==
In 2019, Scherzinger self-financed and staged a series of intimate showcases designed to reintroduce herself to the musical theater community. The first performance took place in October at The Django, a jazz club beneath The Roxy Hotel in New York City, before she brought the show to London the following month. In 2022, she revived the production at The Sun Rose in Los Angeles. Frustrated by limited opportunities to audition for film, television, and theater roles, she developed the show to display her versatility as a performer. Presented to invited audiences, the performances featured a ten-piece band accompanying her through a repertoire of musical theater and jazz standards—including "I Put a Spell on You," "Don't Rain on My Parade," "Maybe This Time," and "Someone to Watch Over Me," alongside several Pussycat Dolls songs, such as a stripped-down "Buttons" and a reggae-style take on "Stickwitu." She also introduced an original composition titled "Never Going Back," which she described as an anthem of self-empowerment and resilience. Scherzinger starred as Norma Desmond in Jamie Lloyd’s 2023 revival of Sunset Boulevard, which opened at the Savoy Theatre in London’s West End before transferring to Broadway the following year. Her performance received widespread critical acclaim and earned her both the Laurence Olivier Award and the Tony Award for Best Actress in a Musical.

In March 6, 2025 Scherzinger announced on March 6, 2025, that she would make her debut performances at Carnegie Hall on October 8, 2025 and at the Walt Disney Concert Hall on October 30, 2025. In July 4, 2025, Scherzinger announced her debut concert at London’s Royal Albert Hall for October 6, 2025. Tickets went on sale on July 11, 2025. The concert series was expected to follow her earlier run of performances.

== Reception ==
Michael Cragg of The Guardian described the Royal Albert Hall show as "bizarre, brilliant, fierce and occasionally frustrating," highlighting Scherzinger's unpredictability and energy. The first act was noted for feeling somewhat disjointed and resembling a comedy routine, with the performer spending less than 50 minutes on stage before the interval. In contrast, the second act received stronger praise, particularly for her powerful vocal performances on the "With One Look" and "As If We Never Said Goodbye," which earned extended standing ovations. Cragg also highlighted her humor and self-awareness, and the Pussycat Dolls medley impressed the audience and left them "borderline dumbstruck." Reporting for the same show, Fabio Magnocavallo of Euphoria magazine agreed noting a slow first act, before the performance gaining energy and momentum in the second half. Her tribute to Prince was noted for its emotional impact. Magnocavallo considered the encore as a standout moment, praising Scherzinger for an energetic and engaging ending.

== Tour dates ==
List of 2025 concerts
Date (2025)	City	Country	Venue
October 6	London	England	Royal Albert Hall
October 8	New York City	United States	Carnegie Hall
October 30	Los Angeles	United States	Walt Disney Concert Hall
