= Right There (Nicole Scherzinger song) =

2011 single by Nicole Scherzinger

Single by Nicole Scherzinger featuring 50 Cent

from the album Killer Love
- Released: May 17, 2011
- Studio: Mason Sound (North Hollywood, California); Record Plant (Los Angeles, California)
- Genre: Pop; R&B
- Length: 4:22
- Label: Interscope
- Songwriters: James Scheffer; Ester Dean; Curtis Jackson; Frank Romano; Daniel Morris
- Producer: Jim Jonsin

Nicole Scherzinger singles chronology
"Coconut Tree" (2011)	"Right There" (2011)	"Out This Club" (2011)

50 Cent singles chronology
"Haters" (2011)	"Right There" (2011)	"Outlaw" (2011)

Music videos
- "Right There" on YouTube; "Right There" (50 Cent remix) on YouTube

"Right There" is a song by American singer Nicole Scherzinger, from her debut studio album, Killer Love (2011). The song was released on May 17, 2011, as the third single from the album by Interscope and associated record labels. As the third single, a remix was recorded featuring American rapper 50 Cent and was included as a bonus track on the Australian edition of the album. The song was originally intended to be the first single to precede the album in the United States. Written by Ester Dean, Frank Romano, Daniel Morris, and co-written and produced by Jim Jonsin, it is an island-flavored midtempo R&B-pop song that sees Scherzinger singing about her what she wants her lover to do and warning other suitors to back off.

Upon its release, "Right There" was praised by critics for its urban production, which stood out from other disco-influenced songs on mainstream radio. Scherzinger also earned praise for the playful nature and Caribbean influences. Music critics compared the song to Bajan artist Rihanna, and her single "Rude Boy". Some critics lamented the song for having lazy lyrics and being overly sexual, critiques Scherzinger denied by calling it a love ballad. In the United Kingdom, the song debuted at number three, giving Scherzinger her fourth consecutive top-ten single.

Outside of the UK, the song peaked in the top-ten of eight other national charts including in Scotland, Ireland, New Zealand, and on Billboard's Euro Digital Songs chart. In the US, "Right There" peaked within the top 40 on the Billboard Hot 100. The song was certified double platinum In Australia by the Australian Recording Industry Association (ARIA), as well gold in both the UK and the US by the British Phonographic Industry (BPI) and Recording Industry Association of America (RIAA), respectively. An accompanying music video, featuring 50 Cent, saw Scherzinger reunite with director Paul Hunter. It features a number of dance scenes set in downtown Los Angeles, with Scherzinger appearing in a Pocahontas-inspired outfit. The visual was the most watched video on YouTube on the day of its release, scoring a similar accolade on MTV's website "Right There" was promoted with multiple live performances across 2011, including appearances and performances on Britain's Got Talent, The Graham Norton Show, Capital FM's Summertime Ball, American Idol and The Ellen DeGeneres Show show. It was also featured in the setlist for Scherzinger's debut solo concert tour, the Killer Love Tour (2012).

== Background and release ==
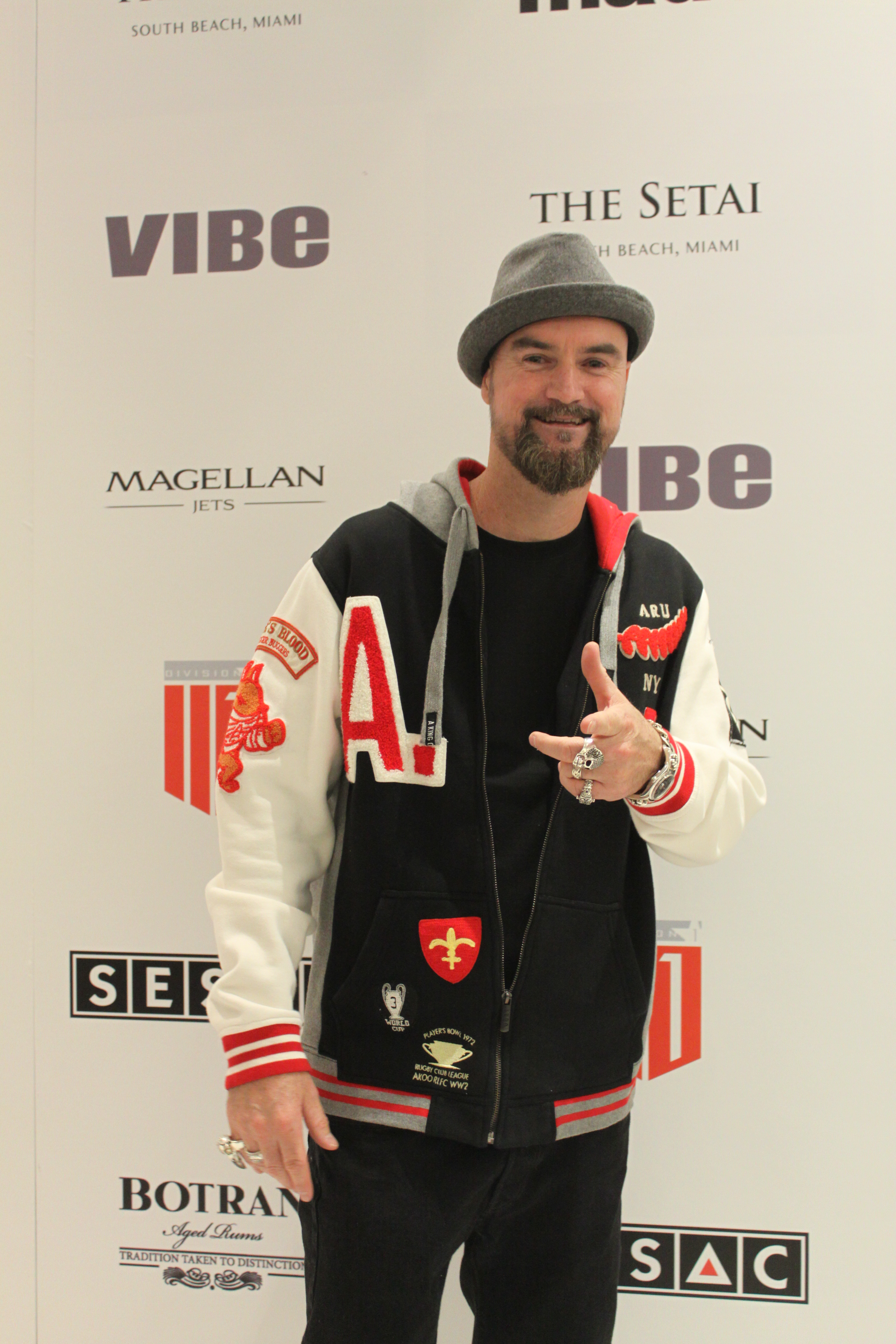
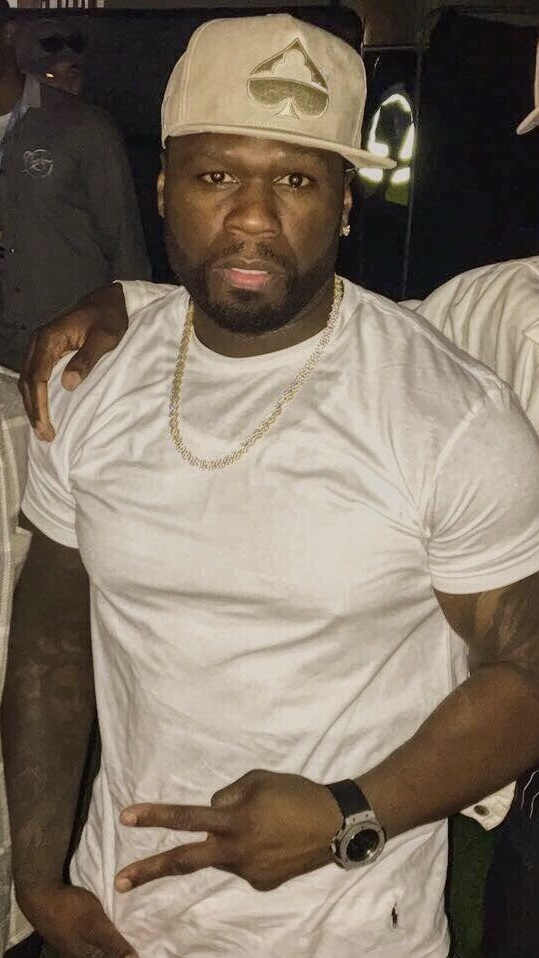
Jim Jonsin (left) produced the song, including two new verses by 50 Cent (right) for the song's single release.

Following the release of "Poison", which reached number three on the UK Singles Chart in November 2010, follow-up single "Don't Hold Your Breath" would go on to top the chart in the United Kingdom in March 2011. This gave Scherzinger her first solo chart topper, though this was her third overall when including singles with the Pussycat Dolls. Shortly after, her debut album Killer Love was released on March 21, 2011. Less than a month later, it was confirmed that "Right There", produced by Jim Jonsin, would be the album's third single in the UK, but also the lead single for the American release of Killer Love. It was also confirmed that American rapper 50 Cent would feature on a new version of the song for the release. The UK release was scheduled for June 6, 2011.

Around the same time as this confirmation, MTV reported that Jim Jonsin was set work with 50 Cent for the first time. Vibe later confirmed that it was during these sessions in April 2011 that 50 Cent added two verses to "Right There". On April 1, 2011, the song was playlisted by BBC Radio 1Xtra and began garnering airplay on UK radio stations. It was released commercially for digital download on May 17, 2011, by Interscope Records and Universal Music. A week later, it was serviced to US contemporary hit radio and rhythmic radio. A remix EP was released on June 24, 2011, in the UK and July 26, 2011, in the United States. In 2022, Rain Radio (a collective of unknown producers and DJs) released the song "He Goes Down", which samples Scherzinger's vocals from "Right There" atop a "house music bassline".

== Recording and production ==
"Right There" was written by James Scheffer, Ester Dean, Frank Romano and Daniel Morris. Dean also co-wrote another Killer Love song, "Wet", which would go on to be released as the fourth single from the album. "Right There" was produced by Jim Jonsin for Rebel Rock, while vocals were produced by Harvey Mason Jr. Angela N. Golightly oversaw co-ordination of production, with the majority of production and recording taking place at the Record Plant in Los Angeles, California. Instrumentation included programming and keyboards played by Jonsin, with further keyboards by Morris, and guitars and bass by Romano. The composition was recorded by Robert Marks, with assistance from Ghazi Hourani. Marks also mixed the record at Record Plant with Matt Huber and Justin Merril. Scherzinger's vocals were recorded by Andrew Hey, David Boyd, and Michael Daley with additional recording from Dabling Howard, all of whom are part of Mason Jr.'s production house and vocals were recorded at his studio Mason Sound in North Hollywood. Chris Cheney and Ky Miller respectively engineered and recorded the single version of "Right There", which features 50 Cent. Mason Jr. is also credited as an additional producer on this version.

== Music and lyrics ==
Musically, "Right There" is a pop and R&B song. According to Eliot Glazier of MTV Buzzworthy, the song is built on an "electric guitar lick that rips through the song's bass line". It was seen as a similar technique and vibe to how "Edge of Seventeen" (1982) by Stevie Nicks was sampled by Destiny's Child on their 2001 single "Bootylicious". Rap-Up's Devin described the song as a "spicy jam" with a "glistening beat". Lewis Corner from Digital Spy described Scherzinger's style of singing on "Right There" as a "seductive faux-Caribbean twang" which complimented the production of "reggae guitar strums", noting that the overall effect was a "tropical flavour". Among the lyrics are the lines "No I ain't never gonna let no girl take him from me / Never gonna let no girl steal him from me / Never gonna let no girl get that close now", highlighting the themes of the song which include expressing love for her partner and fending off unwanted attention from other women. Scherzinger sings "Come here baby put your hands on my body" which segues, into one of 50 Cent's verses, where the rapper says "I'll explore your body completely". AOL Radio's Nadine Cheung noted that the song would draw comparisons to Rihanna, but 50 Cent's lyrics made an "uncanny lyrical reference" to Destiny's Child.

== Critical reception ==
AOL Radio's Cheung praised "Right There" for its "catch repetitive chorus" and an "uncanny lyrical reference". MTV's Glazier agreed with this notion, stating that it was refreshing to see "Right There" embrace an "R&B-heavy sound on a pop record" at a time when radio was playing a lot of "disco-pop". David Griffiths of 4Music listed "Right There" as one of the highlights of the album. He also described the song as a "better and polite version" of Rihanna's "Rude Boy" (2009). Corner of Digital Spy awarded the song four out of five stars, describing it as a "provocative and hip-grinding bottle of pop". Leah Greenblatt of Entertainment Weekly gave "Right There" a B rating and commented that "The ex-Pussycat invites Fiddy to frolic on her own personal Scherzy Shore, purring come-ons in a vaguely Caribbean patois". Becky Bain of Idolator agreed, saying "not sure how much Fiddy adds to this song". However, she also said, "adding a superfluous rap verse to your pop song never seems to go out of style. All the better to make your mark on as many charts as possible, my dear!" Adeshola Adigun for DJ Booth echoed Shetler's commenting: "While there’s nothing ground-breaking about new single Right There, it's one of those songs that you could definitely get down to, after more than a couple drinks at the club[.]"

However, not all reviews were positive, The Guardian's Johnny Dee criticized the song for being a "shameless Rihanna rip-off". He said that the song "is also one of those ridiculous sex songs that completely dispenses with mystery and eroticism and ends up making the fine art of making love sound like DIY instructions". Pip Ellwood for Entertainment-Focus wrote that the "Scherzinger does misfire once or twice like the cod-Jamaican 'Right There'". Andrew Unterberger of Popdust was unimpressed with the song, criticizing it for echoing the sound of Rihanna and the "ridiculous and lazy lyrics". During an interview with ITV1's breakfast TV show Daybreak on June 13, 2011, Scherzinger addressed claims that the song was "too raunchy" by describing "Right There" as a "beautiful love ballad".

== Commercial performance ==
"Right There" made its first chart appearance at number 58 on the UK Singles Chart on the chart dated May 15, 2011. During its fourth week, the song leapt from number fourteen to number three, selling 51,355 copies. Music Week's Alan Jones attributed the high sales to Scherzinger's performances at the final of Britain’s Got Talent and on The Graham Norton Show. "Right There" became Scherzinger's fourth consecutive top-ten single as a solo artist behind "Heartbeat" (2010), "Poison" (2010), and "Don't Hold Your Breath" (2011). Counting her singles with the Pussycat Dolls, it is her eighteenth top-forty single. The song has been certified silver by the British Phonographic Industry (BPI) for shipments of 200,000 copies in the UK. As of December 2011, the song has sold 308,000 copies in the UK and was one of the bestselling songs of 2011. It also remained on the UK singles chart for 23 consecutive weeks. In Ireland "Right There" debuted at number 22 on May 26, 2011. In its fifth week, the song peaked at number seven and it remained in the top-ten for several weeks. It also peaked at number six on Billboard' regional chart for Europe, the Euro Digital Songs chart.

"Right There" entered the New Zealand Singles Chart at number 34 on October 8, 2012, giving Scherzinger her first chart entry as a solo artist in the country. The song entered the top-ten on its fifth week, peaking at number seven for two consecutive weeks. "Right There" debuted at number 40 on the Australian Singles Chart o July 17, 2011. On August 8, 2011, it peaked at number eight, staying for three consecutive weeks. The song has been certified double platinum by the Australian Recording Industry Association (ARIA) for shipments of 140,000 copies in Australia. In the US, the song debuted at number 77 on the Billboard Hot 100 chart on June 4, 2011, selling 30,000 digital copies in its first week. "Right There" became the singer's first chart solo entry since her first attempt at a solo career in 2007. Seven weeks later it reached a final peak at number 39, becoming her highest-charting single on the Hot 100; the song stayed at number 39 for two straight weeks. However, it subsequently dropped down the charts, landing at number 51 two weeks after its peak, and then number 72 the week after. "Right There" also reached number 33 on the Hot Digital Songs on the week ending July 21, 2011. It additionally peaked at number eight on the US Hot Dance Club Songs chart issue dated September 3, 2011. The song was certified gold by the Recording Industry Association of America (RIAA) for selling 500,000 certified units in the US. In Canada, "Right There" peaked at number 44.

== Live performances ==
On May 19, 2011, Scherzinger and 50 Cent made their network television debut performance of "Right There" during the tenth season of American Idol. Scherzinger was dressed in a feather-draped miniskirt and skimpy bustier top, joined onstage by a team of 10 backup dancers showcasing island-inspired moves. She opened the performance in silhouette surrounded by purple light. 50 Cent showed up midway through the song wearing a fitted hat turned backward and cocked to the side along with a jacket, jeans, and dangling chain, before disappearing suddenly from the stage. Gil Kaufman from MTV described Scherzinger's hula as "seductive". An editor from Rap-Up magazine agreed, saying that Scherzinger "heated up the stage in a show-stopping dress while performing [her] single". Amy Sciarretto from PopCrush praised Nicole Scherzinger's performance, complimenting on her vocal and dancing abilities. Sciarretto said, "Scherzinger's performance was easily the most choreographed of the season ... However, Scherzinger never sacrificed a melody, a vocal line or a beat in favor of keeping her body moving. That’s a skill and a talent that takes lots of practice, and one that this crop of contestants is quickly learning". The duo performed the song live again together on The Ellen DeGeneres Show on May 24, 2011.

In June, Scherzinger began promoting "Right There" in the UK, by appearing on series five of Britain's Got Talent to perform the single. She wore a "Grecian-Goddess-meets-flamenco-dancer minidress with feathered skirt, teamed with glittery black ankle boots". Her performance was negatively criticized by musician Mike Stock, who described it as "overtly sexual". Later the same week, on June 10, 2011, Scherziner performed it again on The Graham Norton Show. On June 11, 2011, she appeared at Capital FM's Summertime Ball, performing "Poison", "Don't Hold Your Breath", "Don't Cha", and "Right There". Scherzinger further promoted her single in US, first performing it on July 13 at the Universal CityWalk and then on July 14 on the eighth season of So You Think You Can Dance. An editor from Rap-Up magazine described the whole performance: "Dressed in a midriff-baring top, short shorts, and a sheer white blouse, the 'X Factor' judge whipped her ponytail as she commanded the stage with her troupe of dancers".

== Music video ==
=== Background and synopsis ===
Scherzinger interlacing Hawaiian-inspired dance moves in the music video

The music video for "Right There" was filmed on April 20–21, 2011 in downtown Los Angeles, with Paul Hunter serving as the director. Hunter had previously worked with Scherzinger on the visual for her 2007 single "Whatever U Like". In an interview with MTV News, she said, "I wanted to kinda keep the video pretty simple because I wanted it iconic. The way you get iconic pictures and memorable videos is just by keeping it simple". The video makes use of product placement of Belvedere. The music video premiered through Vevo on May 4, 2011. Two versions were premiered the same day: one being the solo version and the other one featuring 50 Cent. Scherzinger revealed she was excited to collaborate with 50 Cent, saying, "He did his thing on the song. He brought the energy and the spirit. He's 50 for a reason. He's the real deal".

The music video begins with 50 Cent rapping his verses against a blue sky, using green screen technology. As the first verse begins, Scherzinger is seen wearing a blue stomach-revealing crop top paired with leather boots and a braided ponytail, as she walks around a ghostly downtown Los Angeles. Scherzinger is seen also performing on sliding pavements. As the first chorus begins, Scherzinger is seen wearing a Pocahontas-inspired look teamed with a fur-trimmed bolero and a fringed miniskirt. The remainder of the video features Scherzinger and the dancers busting a wide array of dance moves. Scherzinger then joins 50 Cent during his second verse. During the video's conclusion, Scherzinger instigates a sultry impromptu all-girls dance party in an empty warehouse which is turned into a nightclub venue, and the final shot is a closeup of Scherzinger, giving a seductive look, as the video fades.

=== Reception ===
Robbie Daw from Idolator liked the video, stating it "is upbeat, fun and breezy — everything that a springtime pop video should be". Eliot Glazer from MTV Buzzworthy noted that the back-up dancers reminded him that Scherzinger used to be the lead singer of the Pussycat Dolls. AOL Music's Contessa Gayles agreed saying, "She may no longer be a Pussycat Doll, but Nicole's got a whole troupe of sexy dancers backing her up". Archana Ram from Entertainment Weekly negatively criticized 50 Cent's appearance and the use of product placement, calling it a "bit much", but she later wrote that the "video is more than redeemed by Scherzinger’s warbly vocals, bump-and-grind dance moves and totally silly fashion". Jillian Mapes of Billboard commented, "effortless moves from the Dancing With The Stars winner are expected". The video was ranked at number 49 on AOL's 2011 Top 50 Dance Music Videos. According to Billboard, "Right There" was the most watched video on YouTube the day of its release on May 4, 2011. MTV reported that "Right There" was one of the most watched music videos on its website in 2011. The video became Scherzinger's first Vevo certified solo music video. The music video on YouTube has received over 210 million views as of April 2024.

== Track listing ==
Digital download

1. "Right There" (featuring 50 Cent) – 4:22

Digital single

1. "Right There" (featuring 50 Cent) – 4:22
2. "Right There" (Instrumental) – 4:03
3. "Don't Hold Your Breath" (Dave Audé Remix) – 7:16

UK remixes EP

1. "Right There" (Wideboys Remix Full Club) – 6:09
2. "Right There" (Wideboys Dub Remix) – 7:01
3. "Right There" (Frankmusik Remix) – 3:18
4. "Right There" (The Sound of Arrows Remix) – 3:36

Digital download – remixes

1. "Right There" (Marco V Remix) – 5:18
2. "Right There" (John Dahlbäck Remix) – 6:02
3. "Right There" (Frankmusik Remix) – 3:18
4. "Right There" (The Sound of Arrows Remix) – 3:35
5. "Right There" (Desi Hits! DJ Lloyd Remix) – 4:58
6. "Right There" (Gemini Remix) – 4:17
7. "Right There" (Chris Lake Remix) – 5:29
8. "Right There" (Desi Hits! Culture Shock Remix) – 4:07
9. "Right There" (Manhattan Clique Remix) – 6:33
10. "Right There" (Dave Spoon Remix) – 5:50
11. "Right There" (Wideboys Remix Full Club) – 6:10

== Credits and personnel ==
Credits adapted from album credits, and Tidal for the single version.

Recording locations

- Recorded and mixed at Record Plant Recording Studios in Los Angeles, California
- Vocals recorded at Mason Sound in North Hollywood, California

Personnel

- 50 Cent – featured vocals (single version only)
- Chris Cheney – additional engineer (single version only)
- David Boyd – assistant recording engineer (vocals)
- Michael Daley – assistant recording engineer (vocals)
- Angela N. Golightly – production coordination
- Dabling Harward – additional recording engineer (vocals)
- Andrew Hey – recording engineer (vocals)
- Ghazi Hourani – assistant recording engineer
- Matt Huber – assistant mixing engineer
- Robert Marks – recording engineer, mixing engineer
- Harvey Mason Jr. – vocal producer, additional producer (single version only)
- Justin Merrill – assistant mixing engineer
- Ky Miller – recording engineer (single version only)
- Danny Morris – additional keyboards
- Frank Romano – guitars, bass
- James "Jim Jonsin" Scheffer – producer, programming, keyboards
- Nicole Scherzinger – lead vocals

== Charts ==
=== Weekly charts ===
Chart performance for "Right There"
Chart (2011)	Peak position
Australia (ARIA)	8
Australia Urban (ARIA)	3
Brazil (Billboard Hot 100)	59
Brazil (Billboard Hot Pop Songs)	89
Canada Hot 100 (Billboard)	44
Czech Republic Airplay (ČNS IFPI)	60
Denmark (Tracklisten)	36
Euro Digital Songs (Billboard)	6
Finland (Suomen virallinen lista)	21
Germany (GfK)	61
Iceland (Tónlistinn)	29
Ireland (IRMA)	7
New Zealand (Recorded Music NZ)	7
Norway (VG-lista)	30
Poland (Polish Airplay Chart)	43
Romania (International Airplay 100)	4
Scottish Singles Sales (Official Charts)	4
Slovakia Airplay (ČNS IFPI)	27
UK Singles (Official Charts)	3
US Billboard Hot 100	39
US Dance Club Songs (Billboard)	8
US Pop Airplay (Billboard)	17
US Rhythmic Airplay (Billboard)	29

=== Year-end charts ===
2011 year-end charts for "Right There"
Chart (2011)	Position
Australia (ARIA)	78
Australia (ARIA) Urban Singles	28
Romania (Romanian Top 100)	15
UK Singles Chart (Official Charts Company)	66
Ukraine Airplay (TopHit)	130

== Certifications ==
Certifications for "Right There"
Region	Certification	Certified units/sales
Australia (ARIA)	2× Platinum	140,000^{‡}
Brazil (Pro-Música Brasil)	Gold	30,000^{‡}
New Zealand (RMNZ)	Platinum	30,000^{‡}
United Kingdom (BPI)	Gold	400,000^{^}
United States (RIAA)	Gold	500,000^{*}
^{*} Sales figures based on certification alone.^{^} Shipments figures based on certification alone.^{‡} Sales+streaming figures based on certification alone.

== Release history ==
Release history and formats for "Right There"
Country	Date	Format	Label	Ref
Austria	May 17, 2011	Digital single	Universal Music	
Germany	May 17, 2011	Digital single	Universal Music	
Netherlands	May 17, 2011	Digital single	Universal Music	
New Zealand	May 17, 2011	Digital single	Universal Music	
Sweden	May 17, 2011	Digital single	Universal Music	
Canada	May 17, 2011	Digital download	Interscope Records	
United States	May 17, 2011	Digital download	Interscope Records	
United Kingdom	May 17, 2011	Remixes EP	Polydor Records	
United States	May 24, 2011	Contemporary radio	Interscope Records	
United States	May 24, 2011	rhythmic radio	Interscope Records	
United Kingdom	June 24, 2011	Digital single	Polydor Records	
United States	July 26, 2011	Digital remixes	Interscope Records	
