= Wet (Nicole Scherzinger song) =

2011 single by Nicole Scherzinger

Single by Nicole Scherzinger

from the album Killer Love
- Released: August 28, 2011
- Recorded: 2010
- Studio: Roc the Mic (New York City); Westlake Recording (Los Angeles, California); The Bunker (Paris, France)
- Genre: Dance-pop
- Length: 3:37
- Label: Interscope
- Songwriters: Tor E. Hermansen; Mikkel S. Eriksen; Sandy Wilhelm; Ester Dean; Traci Hale
- Producers: StarGate; Sandy Vee

Nicole Scherzinger singles chronology
"Out This Club" (2011)	"Wet" (2011)	"Try with Me" (2011)

Music video
- "Wet" on YouTube

"Wet" is a song by American singer Nicole Scherzinger, taken from her debut solo studio album Killer Love (2011). The song was written by Ester Dean and Traci Hale, co-written and produced by Norwegian duo StarGate (Tor E. Hermansen and Mikkel S. Eriksen) and Sandy Vee. The song was serviced as the fourth single from the album to British radio stations on August 28, 2011, by Polydor Records, while in Australia it was released in the following month.

The dance-pop song features Scherzinger singing that "her body is aching for a man's touch". It received generally positive reviews from music critics. The song received moderate commercial success where it peaked at number twenty-one on the UK Singles Chart, in addition to peaking at number ten on the Irish Singles Chart, where it also became one of her highest charting releases. The accompanying music video for "Wet" was directed by Justin Francis. It was generally well received by critics which favored Scherzinger's intricate choreography.

== Background and composition ==
"Wet" was recorded in 2010 at Roc the Mic Studios in New York City, Westlake Recording Studios in Los Angeles and The Bunker Studios in Paris. Scherzinger's vocals were recorded by Eriksen and Miles Walker at Roc the Mic Studios and Westlake Recording Studios and by Vee at The Bunker Studios. "Wet" was mixed by Vee at The Bunker Studios and by Phil Tan at The Ninja Beat Club in Atlanta, Georgia. Additional and assistant engineering was carried out by Damien Lewis. All instrumentation was completed by Eriksen, Hermansen and Vee. "Wet" was not given a traditional release. In the UK, it was given an impact date of August 28, 2011; sometimes record labels will choose a date for a song to impact as a single and for promotion but not give the song a separate listing from the album in digital download stores. Just less than a month later, it was serviced to radio in Australia on September 26, 2011.

"Wet" is an uptempo track, containing a thumping disco beat, a throbbing bass, and electronic beats. The song was written by Ester Dean and Traci Hale, and co-written and produced by Norwegian duo StarGate and Sandy Vee. Scherzinger is said to confesses that her body is "aching for a man's touch", stating "This beat is filthy dirty/ I feel it all over me". Described as a "dance-ready club banger" by Idolator, the song chronicles "many sexy ways" Scherzinger gets wet; sweating, a shower, a swim, and drowning. Scherzinger continues the whole "drenched" theme within the songs' chorus: "Well Imma take my clothes off/Take a leap and surf through the crowd/Dripping down my neck/Soaking wet, sink or swim or you drown/Let's get a little wet." In the song, Scherzinger sings "I feel like whatever I do tonight would be the talk of the town."

== Critical reception ==
"Wet" garnered generally positive reviews from critics. Awarding the song with three out of five stars, Robert Copsey of Digital Spy gave the song a mixed review, stating that although Scherzinger purrs with conviction, the song sounds ultimately similar to Rihanna's "Only Girl (In the World)". While reviewing the album, the same website reviewed "Wet" as a highlight of the album, and named it a possible future single. Idolator stated that Scherzinger is "positively dripping with sex appeal in her ode to getting doused", later adding that the Stargate-produced "dance jam is the musical equivalent of a run through the sprinkler". Idolator finished its review by stating that after an addition of a well-known rapper, the song could hit the domestic Top 40. While reviewing the album, Becky Bain of Idolator stated that "Wet" along with "Club Banger Nation" would strike a chord with clubgoers. David Griffiths of 4Music named "Wet" an essential addition to anybody's party playlist. In another interview by Griffiths, he named "Wet" a "cracking pop tune", stating that the "hits keep coming" for Scherzinger. Describing the song as a "surefire smash" for Scherzinger, Pip Ellwood of Entertainment-Focus complimented the song as the best track on the album, stating that its beat is better than that of lead single "Poison" due to the fact that it is "impossible not to move to."

== Chart performance ==
"Wet" debuted on the UK Singles Chart at number 189. On the week of August 20, 2011, it went to its peak of number 21. "Wet" debuted on the Irish Singles Chart at number forty-eight on the week ending August 11, 2011. The following week, August 18, 2011, "Wet" climbed to number ten on the Irish Singles Chart. The song also peaked at number thirteen on the Scottish Singles Chart.

== Music video ==
The music video for "Wet" was shot in a single day to accommodate her schedule as a judge on the X Factor. It was shot on a Los Angeles car park – it was the only suitable location due to its proximity to the X Factor studios. The video was directed by Justin Francis. On August 2, 2011, Scherzinger released behind the scenes photos of the song's music video with Scherzinger wearing a two-piece attire and clutching a net around her body as she stands behind a wall of water. The video makes use of product placement of Carrera's "Champion". The music video premiered through MSN Music UK on August 3, 2011.

=== Synopsis ===
As Scherzinger performs athletic and acrobatic choreography, she interlaces what is believed to be an old Navajo rain dance used to call upon the gods to end a drought.

The video begins with Scherzinger hiding out from the police, evading capture, and disguising herself with some aviator shades and a studded hoodie. As she is being surveyed by security camera, Scherzinger begins to dance athletically and acrobatically. Jenna Hally Rubenstein of MTV Buzzworthy believed that part of Scherzinger's dance contained old Navajo rain dance moves. Scherzinger then alternates outfits, as scenes of Scherzinger singing behind a windowpane while it’s raining are interlaced into the clip. Scherzinger, accompanied by a group of female dancers, than enter an indoor swimming pool where men are seen spraying graffiti into the wall. Scherzinger and her backup dancers than begin to dance in the emptied concrete pool, as the men begin to soak Scherzinger with hoses. As the police enter the building, Scherzinger is warned by a man acting as a lookout. Scherzinger and all her companions escape, only to leave the police discovering a spray-painted message of "Wet".

=== Critical reception ===
Critics generally favored the song's accompanying music video, in particular Scherzinger's intricate choreography. On the day the video premiered, a reviewer from Rap-Up wrote "It’s getting hot in here," referencing Scherzinger's "smokin’ body" and "steamy visuals". Staff of Idolator spoke favorably of Scherzinger's choreography, stating that it "would make the other Pussycat Dolls blush". Amy Sciarretto of PopCrush gave the video a positive review stating that she was impressed of Scherzinger's athletic and acrobatic methods of dancing. She continued, "she doesn’t even have to try and be sexy; she just is". Jenna Hally Rubenstein of MTV Buzzworthy appreciated Scherzinger's writhing around on the floor in "somewhat compromising positions" and added that Scherzinger is wet for about 50 percent of the video, so "we're guessing guys across the country aren't going to be writing complaint letters anytime soon." "Wet" ranked at number 70 on MTV's most watched music videos of 2011.

== Live performances ==
Scherzinger performed the song for the first time in Stratford, London at Westfield Stratford City on September 13, 2011, included in a set of multiple songs off of Killer Love. The song was also performed in 2012 on her first solo tour, the Killer Love Tour.

== Credits and personnel ==
Recording

- Recorded at Roc the Mic Studios, New York; Westlake Recording Studios, Los Angeles, California; The Bunker Studios, Paris.
- Mixed at The Bunker Studios, Paris; Ninja Club Studios, Atlanta, Georgia.

Personnel

- Songwriting – Mikkel S. Eriksen, Tor Erik Hermansen, Sandy Wilhelm, Ester Dean, Traci Hale
- Production – Stargate, Sandy Vee
- Mixing – Sandy Vee, Phil Tan
- Additional engineering – Damien Lewis
- Instruments – Mikkel S. Eriksen, Tor Erik Hermansen, Sandy Vee
- Background vocals – Ester Dean

Credits adapted from Killer Love booklet liner notes.

== Charts and certifications ==
=== Weekly charts ===
Chart (2011)	Peak position
Australia (ARIA)	34
Belgium (Ultratip Flanders)	64
Ireland (IRMA)	10
Romania (UPFR)	86
Scottish Singles Sales (Official Charts)	13
Slovakia Airplay (ČNS IFPI)	36
UK Singles (Official Charts)	21

=== Year-end charts ===
Chart (2011)	Position
UK Singles (Official Charts Company)	155

=== Certifications ===
Region	Certification	Certified units/sales
United Kingdom (BPI)	Silver	200,000^{‡}
^{‡} Sales+streaming figures based on certification alone.

== Radio and release history ==
Country	Date	Format	Label
United Kingdom	August 28, 2011	Impact day	Polydor Records
Australia	September 26, 2011	Mainstream radio	Universal Music

== See also ==
- Nicole Scherzinger discography
- List of songs recorded by Nicole Scherzinger
