= Killer Love =

- Standard edition cover

Studio album by Nicole Scherzinger
- Released: March 18, 2011
- Recorded: 2010–2011
- Genres: Pop; Eurodance; R&B
- Length: 55:10
- Label: Interscope
- Producers: Josh Alexander; Beatgeek; Boi-1da; The Maven Boys; The-Dream; Carl Falk; Trina Harmon; Kuk Harrell; Jimmy Joker; Jim Jonsin; Harvey Mason, Jr.; Steve Josefsson; Rami; RedOne; Stargate; Bill Steinberg; Tricky Stewart; Julian Swirsky; Mark Taylor; Sandy Vee

Nicole Scherzinger chronology
Killer Love (2011)	Big Fat Lie (2014)

Singles from Killer Love
- 1. "Poison" Released: October 25, 2010; 2. "Don't Hold Your Breath" Released: March 10, 2011; 3. "Right There" Released: May 17, 2011; 4. "Wet" Released: August 28, 2011

Killer Love is the debut solo studio album by American singer Nicole Scherzinger which features special guest appearances from Sting, Enrique Iglesias and 50 Cent. It was released on March 18, 2011, by Interscope Records, in association with its affiliated record labels. Scherzinger had been working on a solo album since 2005, under the title Her Name Is Nicole and was originally due for release in 2007. However, unsuccessful singles and poor timing led the project being pushed back numerous times. After releasing The Pussycat Dolls' second studio album Doll Domination (2008), Scherzinger shelved the project entirely citing bad timing and creative issues as the reasons for its cancellation. Many of its songs were reassigned to the Dolls or other artists. In 2010, Moroccan producer RedOne was brought on board for a second attempt at launching her solo album.

Completed in 2011 and titled Killer Love, Scherzinger's debut album features a combination of up-tempo pop and Eurodance songs, as well as mid-tempo ballads. Songs contain influences of rock, soul and funk music, with the specific aim of selecting songs and productions which would lend themselves to being performed live. Amongst the fourteen-song track listing are two collaborations, one with Enrique Iglesias, and one with Sting, the latter of which was a leftover from the Her Name Is Nicole recording sessions. RedOne and his associates produced almost half of the album, while other contributions come from the likes of Jim Jonsin, Stargate, The-Dream, Tricky Stewart and Boi-1da. It would be her first and only solo studio album with Interscope, after she ended her ten-year partnership in 2014 and signed a record deal with RCA Records.

Killer Love was preceded by the release of "Poison", which peaked at number three and numbers seven in the United Kingdom and Ireland, respectively. The album's second single, "Don't Hold Your Breath", would go on to top the UK Singles Chart and reach the top five in Ireland. In an attempt to launch the album worldwide, a new version of "Right There", featuring 50 Cent, was released, becoming one of Scherzinger's highest-charting solo singles. The song gave Scherzinger her first entry on the US Billboard Hot 100 as a lead artist. Another single was released from the standard edition of the album, "Wet", which became her fourth consecutive top-ten hit in Ireland. A repackaged edition of the album spawned a brand new mid-tempo single titled "Try with Me". It gave Scherzinger her fifth consecutive top-twenty hit in the United Kingdom and helped the album to receive a gold certification from the British Phonographic Industry (BPI).

Upon its release, Killer Love received mixed to positive response from music critics. Some praised Scherzinger's strong vocals and conviction to convey emotion, while others criticized her choice of allowing RedOne to produce the majority of the album, stating that some of the songs sounded too similar to each other. At times it was felt that Scherzinger lacked coherence across the record, often taking the sound that individual producers had created for her instead of showing originality. Critics compared many of the songs to those her fellow pop and R&B contemporaries Beyoncé and Rihanna. Scherzinger recorded new songs with R. Kelly, Snoop Dogg and Ne-Yo for the North American release of Killer Love; however, she announced recording for her second studio album, originally scheduled for late 2013 release, had begun, signaling the end of the promotion for this album. In 2021, a campaign group successfully petitioned Universal Music to release Killer Love for streaming and downloads in the United States; it was released on January 7, 2021.

== Background ==
=== Recording and development ===
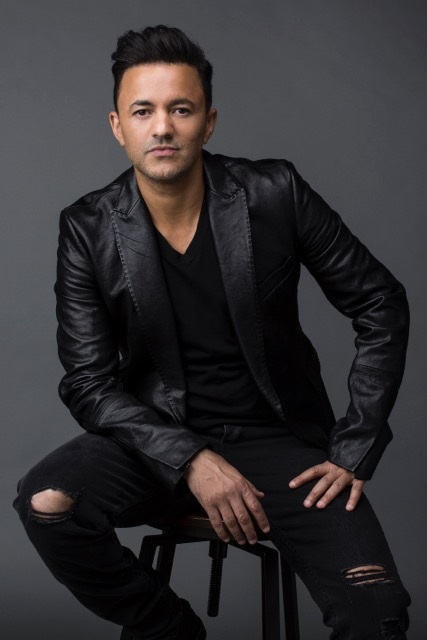
RedOne was brought on board to see the final studio sessions which led to Killer Love being released.

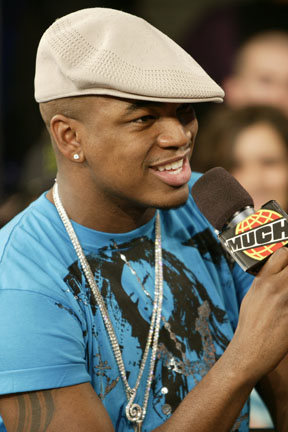
Scherzinger worked with American singer songwriter Ne-Yo whilst recording her debut album.

Amidst worldwide success with The Pussycat Dolls, Scherzinger initially began work on her debut studio album back in 2005. The project, titled Her Name is Nicole, saw the singer recording 75–100 songs, with some of the songs later ending up with the Pussycat Dolls. Amongst those working on the album were Akon, Gary Lightbody, Dr. Dre, Ne-Yo, T.I., Timbaland, will.i.am, and Kanye West. However following four unsuccessful singles, Scherzinger admitted she was going to restart her album. In an interview with Billboard magazine in April 2009, she said "the current incarnation of [my album] is just in talks and in the writing process. I haven't started recording yet". Singer-songwriter Keri Hilson, confirmed that Scherzinger's album was not released so that Scherzinger could focus on the Pussycat Dolls instead. Then in January 2010, Scherzinger began the recording and writing process once again, reuniting with Ne-Yo on "personal and heartfelt" tracks. She attempted to launch her debut album for a second time in May 2010, with a brand new "rock, funk, soul edge" sound, and a brand new single "Nobody Can Change Me".

Then in August 2010, Moroccan producer RedOne confirmed his involvement in the project during an interview with BBC Music, where he confirmed that it was the third time that new material had been recorded for the album. When asked why he thought the album didn't previously come out RedOne said "Her last one never came out because it was collecting hamburgers, like fast food. One from McDonald's, one from Burger King, and so on. It tasted good, but it wasn't consistent." He confirmed that he had produced the majority of the new album. Scherzinger followed up his comments in an interview with X magazine in September 2010. She said "It was actually my decision not to put Her Name Is Nicole out, not the label's". Scherzinger then said how much of an honor it was to work with RedOne. "He's an unbelievable producer and musician. He had made some amazing songs with Lady Gaga. Now, there is someone with the 'x factor'. I can't touch GaGa or RedOne in that space, but I know that we've created something unique of our own." RedOne revealed that Jimmy Iovine (chairman of Scherzinger's record label) personally called him to work on Scherzinger's album.

"Honestly, Jimmy, if you want me to do it you gotta just trust me and let me do it, let me do a body of work and not chase a single" He was like, 'Absolutely, you go and create magic and create a style and everything. That's what we did. I think we created a new sound for Nicole Scherzinger that fits her, that really represents who she is, and you're gonna be impressed when you hear it."

— RedOne on the process of working on the album's sound and influence

According to Billboard, Scherzinger had collaborated with Ne-Yo and Jay Sean for songs on the album, while Scherzinger confirmed that the album was mostly up-tempo songs which "lend themselves to live performances". Though Ne-Yo's songs are not featured on the international version of the album, Scherzinger confirmed that songs produced by the singer-songwriter would appear on the US version of Killer Love. When Scherzinger was asked by her UK-label (Polydor Records) which artists she wanted to work with, Scherzinger's only request was UK rapper Plan B.

=== Re-releases ===
In the UK and Ireland, a new version of the album was released in November 2011, featuring several new songs including a new single, "Try With Me". A further repackaged version of the album was in development for the US, featuring an alternate track listing; Scherzinger confirmed, during an interview with MTV, that the US album would contain contributions from RedOne, Ne-Yo, Jim Jonsin, The-Dream and Tricky Stewart. In addition to this, 50 Cent was featured on the album's US lead single, a new version of the Jonsin-produced, "Right There". American rapper Snoop Dogg was to appear on one of the new songs recorded for the US album. At the time of recording in August 2011, Scherzinger had over forty songs to choose from for the new release, but said that it would "not be finished until the very last minute. I don't know if I will ever feel like I have finished the album." After being part of the inaugural judging panel on the first season of reality TV show, The X Factor USA, the following year in 2012, Scherzinger crossed the Atlantic to judge (and win) the ninth series of the British edition of The X Factor. Whilst deciding whether or not to return to tenth series, Scherzinger unveiled that she had been working on her second studio album due for a global release in November 2013. The planned US release of the album and the Killer Love era ended soon after; Digital Spy confirmed that Scherzinger had left Interscope for a new record deal with RCA Records and Sony Music. Her second album, Big Fat Lie was released on October 17, 2014. Almost a decade after the release of Killer Love, the campaign group Pop Music Activism managed to petition Universal Music to release Killer Love on digital platforms in the United States. The deluxe edition featuring all of the previously released songs in international territories was made available to stream and download.

== Title and artwork ==
In early 2011, Scherzinger announced that the musically diverse music she recorded had a bittersweet theme in which she titled the album, Killer Love, saying "I wrote 'Killer Love' about a tortured love. Where you can't get enough of the love but it's not good for you. And I guess when the fans listen to the album, I want them to know that a lot of the music that I chose had to do with my past experiences and relationships, where I've lost myself many times. It's [about] being lost and broken and in a very fearful, dark place and the process [of] coming out of that. It's a very empowering album but it comes from a place of heartbreak." On March 2, 2011, Rap-Up revealed the cover art along with the track listing for Killer Love. On the standard cover, Scherzinger strikes a comfy pose, cracking a half-smile with a tuft of gray fur draped over her left shoulder. On October 20, 2011, the re-release cover was released with Scherzinger smiling coyly and draped lightly in a loose, unidentified, furry and wind-blown article of clothing similar to the first cover.

== Music, songs and lyrics ==
Digital Spy asked Scherzinger to describe Killer Love's sound, during an interview she replied said "the album is largely produced by RedOne, I wanted something explosive that could be staged live in a full performance and I needed music to match the intensity. That's what he did. It's raw, dangerous and big. That's what I want to be on stage. It's a different energy to Lady Gaga. The music is more rock, funk and soul inspired." Killer Love sees Scherzinger duet with two male vocalists. On the ballad, "Power's Out", she duets with English recording artist Sting. Speaking of their collaboration, which took place with both singers in the same studio, Scherzinger said "[Sting's] energy is very commanding, in a subtle way. He is giving, generous and kind. I flew to Boston for his show with the Police. I met him and he was everything and more than I thought. I felt like we were doing yoga when we were singing. He was such an easy guy to work with... Singing on the same mic you are really close. He had fresh breath. No broccoli in the teeth." David Renshaw from PopDash said the song borrowed elements and the sound from the Police, a band Sting was previously lead singer of, and in particular their 1983 hit single "Every Breath You Take". The other duet is with Enrique Iglesias, on his 2010 single "Heartbeat". The version featured on Killer Love is the "Rude Well's Open Heart Remix". Ellwood noted that the remix "added beats changing the tone of the song completely."

Some of the album's ballads, "Casualty" and "Desperate", were likened to the style of Leona Lewis. "Casualty" is one of the album's two closing ballads, the other being "AmenJena". The former is a "contemporary ballad-that's-not-a-ballad", while the latter is slower and more moving, as it is stripped of the album's synthesized and electronic production, to leace Scherzinger's voice with the piano-led melody. The album's other ballad "Everybody" also restricts the polished production, "to allow Scherzinger's voice to be the main focus." When talking to MTV, in the United States, Scherzinger said [in context of the US version of her album] it was "a mixture of strong dance anthems, urban twists and uplifting songs."

Critics noted "You Will Be Loved" for its background vocals, which contain some yodelling. Its chorus is constructed by repeating the title of the song, similar to "Gimme More" by Britney Spears (2007) and "Halo" by Beyoncé (2009). It was written by Timothy and Theron Thomas, a duo who had previously written "Supervillain", the third single from Scherzinger's ill-fated first incarnation of her solo album, Her Name Is Nicole. "Right There" was compared to Rihanna's "Rude Boy", only politer in tone. Both "Rude Boy" and "Right There" were co-written by Ester Dean. The latter features a "glistening beat", over which Scherzinger becomes territorial with her man, and warns other girls away. Additionally, an alternate version of the song was recorded with 50 Cent, to be included on the US version of Killer Love. The album's lead single, "Poison", was described by 4 Music as a club thumper, while the follow-up, "Don't Hold Your Breath", was described as "sort-of-ballad-but-not-really." The Observer's Michael Cragg also noted "Don't Hold Your Breath" as a "classy don't-darken-my-door-again anthem." Renshaw compared the song to Jordin Sparks and Chris Brown's 2008 duet "No Air".

Killer Love also features a number of up-tempo songs including "Wet", described as a "party playlist essential" thanks to its throbbing base and electronic beats. It was described, by Phillip Ellwood from Entertainment Focus, as the best of the up-tempos. the title track was described as "catchy", with a "juicy beat", and "radio-friendly" chorus. It features a "HI-NRG" beat with saucy lyrics which "equate love to actual, physical pain." Another one of the up-tempo songs, "Club Banger Nation" features a 1990s Europop introduction, with "shimmering beats and belting vocals" "Say Yes" was originally produced by The Cave (Jonas Saeed & Pontus Söderqvist), during early recording sessions. It was written by RedOne, Jimmy Joker, Jonas Saeed, Pontus Söderqvist, Nailah Thourbourne, Nyanda Thourbourne, Tasha Thourbourne, Candace Thourbourne. Nailah had previously worked with Scherzinger twice, contributing to "Puakenikini" with Nayanda Thourborne and working with Akon, Scherzinger and Giorgio Tuinfort on the song "On My Side". Both were recorded for Her Name Is Nicole, though the former was also released as one of the cancelled album's ill-fated singles. For its inclusion on Killer Love, "Say Yes" was re-tooled and reproduced by RedOne and Joker. Renshaw compared the song to works by Taio Cruz, thanks to the elements of Eurodance present in its production.

== Critical reception ==
Professional ratings
Review scores
Source	Rating
4Music	4/5 stars
AllMusic	2.5/5 stars
Digital Spy	3/5 stars
Drowned in Sound	3/10
Evening Standard	2/5 stars
The New Zealand Herald	3/5 stars

Upon its release, Killer Love received a mixed to positive critical response, with most reviewers acknowledging Scherzinger's strong vocal performance while differing on the album's overall consistency. Positive reviews highlighted her vocal control and pop appeal, with Pip Ellwood from Entertainment Focus describing it as "a competent and enjoyable record," while 4Music suggested it would "definitely establish her as a viable act in her own right." Robert Copsey of Digital Spy was similarly favourable, calling it "a sturdy debut" that partly fulfils her promise of being "in your face and strong." Michael Cragg of The Observer also noted its broad appeal, describing it as "two thirds deliriously catchy pop stompers and one third balladry," though he felt Scherzinger's "not so inconsiderable voice" is often overshadowed by production choices. Sarah-Louise James of The Daily Star described Killer Love as "unabashed dance/R&B/pop," characterising it as an album "designed as an add-on to" Scherzinger's "already huge popularity more so than a bid to change the course of pop history." She further noted that "there are lots of bangers, a couple of vocal belters," highlighting both its commercial orientation and its inclusion of standout vocal performances.

More mixed assessments pointed to uneven songwriting and production. Writing for The New Zealand Herald, Kristin Macfarlane concluded that Killer Love contains "some really good party tracks and some mediocre ballads," while Celina Murphy from Hot Press found that Killer Love described the album as inconsistent Euro-pop, calling it "two parts stomping Eurodisco filler" lacking cohesion, and called it "the most perfect example of vacuous Europop drivel." Alex Macpherson from BBC Online argued that while Scherzinger can "dominate [her] beats rather than vice versa," the album is at times weighed down by "substandard, unmemorable songs." Stephen Thomas Erlewine of AllMusic similarly criticised the lack of "powerful hooks in the rhythms or melodies." Stronger criticism focused on a perceived lack of originality and cohesion. Hugh Montgomery from The Independent described the album as a "debut that bludgeons the listener with faux-raunchy Euro-dance," arguing it is overly long and inconsistent in tone. David Smyth of The Evening Standard called it largely derivative, stating that "most of Killer Love could be by any of half a dozen robotic pop divas," and criticised its reliance on "bombast." Drowned in Sound's Robert Leedham was even more dismissive, stating that "there is a lot to dislike about Killer Love," calling parts of it "simply crass" and highlighting only a few standout tracks amid otherwise "crowd-pleasing flops." At the end of 2011, Pop Justice ranked Killer Love the tenth best album of 2011.

== Commercial performance ==
Killer Love made its chart debut in Ireland on March 25, 2011, at number fourteen. Two days later, it would make its UK Album Chart debut at number eight, selling 19,743 copies. That same day, the album also charted at number four on the UK's Digital Albums Chart. Upon the release of Killer Love, the title track charted on the UK Singles Chart at number 184 due to strong digital sales from the album. On April 2, 2011, the album made its debut on the Scottish Albums Chart at number six becoming Killer Love's highest charting position on any chart. It became the 73rd biggest selling album of the year in the same country. Killer Love was the twentieth best selling album by a female artist in 2011.

After eight months of release, Killer Love managed to sell 140,000 copies in the United Kingdom. It spent a total of 36 consecutive weeks on the UK Albums Chart in 2011. On March 26, the album was released in France and sold 10,000 copies. Elsewhere, Killer Love charted at number 23 in France, 26 in Australia and 34 in New Zealand. The album has been certified gold by the British Phonographic Industry (BPI) for shipments of 100,000 copies.

== Promotion ==
=== Live performances ===
The first single, "Poison" was performed for the first time on the series seven of The X Factor, on November 28, 2010. The following day, she reprised the performance on ITV's breakfast show, Daybreak Scherzinger performed her next single, "Don't Hold Your Breath" live for the first time on series six of Dancing on Ice on March 6, 2011. Scherzinger promoted the single again on Loose Women on March 7, 2011. During the week the song was also performed on Lorraine on March 8, 2011, and on March 13, 2011, on Let's Dance for Comic Relief. On March 17, 2011, she performed on T4.

On August 18, 2011, Scherzinger performed the song for the first time in the US on Regis & Kelly. On October 12, 2011, Scherzinger performed the song on Good Morning America. Scherzinger performed the song for the last time in the US on November 11, 2011, on The Tonight Show with Jay Leno. On May 19, 2011, Scherzinger and 50 Cent made their debut performance of "Right There" on the stage of American Idol. An editor from Rap-Up magazine agreed, saying that "The ex-Pussycat Doll heated up the stage in a show-stopping dress while performing [her] single." Amy Sciarretto praised Nicole Scherzinger's performance complimenting on her vocal and dancing abilities. Sciarretto said "Scherzinger's performance was easily the most choreographed of the season ... However, Scherzinger never sacrificed a melody, a vocal line or a beat in favor of keeping her body moving. That's a skill and a talent that takes lots of practice, and one that this crop of contestants is quickly learning." The duo performed the song live again together on The Ellen DeGeneres Show on May 24, 2011.

In June 2011, Scherzinger flew to the UK to promote her next single, "Right There", first performing on the final of Britain's Got Talent. Later the same week, on June 10, 2011, she performed it again on The Graham Norton Show. Scherzinger further promoted her single in the United States first performing it on July 13 at the Universal CityWalk and then on July 14 on the eighth season of So You Think You Can Dance. Scherzinger performed the last single, "Try With Me" live for the first time on the eighth series of The X Factor on October 30, 2011. She performed it again on This Morning on November 4, 2011.

=== The Killer Love Tour ===
The Killer Love Tour
- Tour by Nicole Scherzinger
- Promotional poster for the O_{2} Apollo Manchester show
- Location: Europe; Asia
- Associated album: Killer Love
- Start date: February 13, 2012
- End date: March 23, 2012
- No. of shows: 7

On October 25, 2011, Scherzinger made an announcement in the UK that she would embark on her very first solo tour in February 2012. Scherzinger performed seven shows and the tour received positive feedback from critics.

Date	City	Country	Venue	Attendance	Revenue
Europe
February 13, 2012	Brussels	Belgium	Ancienne Belgique	—	—
February 15, 2012	Belfast	Northern Ireland	Waterfront Hall	$109,058	2,213 / 2,213
February 16, 2012	Dublin	Ireland	Olympia Theatre	$70,807	1,591 / 1,591
February 19, 2012	London	England	Hammersmith Apollo	—	—
February 22, 2012	Manchester	England	O_{2} Apollo Manchester	—	—
February 23, 2012	Birmingham	England	O_{2} Academy Birmingham	—	—
Asia
March 23, 2012	Kuala Lumpur	Malaysia	Petronas Towers	—	—

UK Dates – Setlist
1. "Club Banger Nation"
2. "Poison"
3. "Killer Love"
4. "Baby Love"
5. "Pretty"
6. "I Will Always Love You"
7. "You Will Be Loved"
8. "Buttons"/"Jai Ho! (You Are My Destiny)"/"Wait a Minute"/"I Will Survive"/"Hush Hush"/"I Hate This Part"
9. "Stickwitu"
10. "When I Grow Up"
11. "Wet"
12. "Try with Me"
13. "Right There"
14. "Don't Cha"
15. "Don't Hold Your Breath"

Opening acts

- UK – Mindless Behavior

== Singles ==
To lead the album's release in the United Kingdom, "Poison" was unveiled as Killer Love's lead single on October 14, 2010. Then on December 11, 2010, the single debuted at number one on the Scottish Singles Chart. Additionally "Poison" made its UK chart debut at number three with first-week sales of 67,425 thus becoming one of her most successful single in the UK, as a solo or featured artist. It also peaked at number two on the UK Digital Singles chart. In Ireland, the single debuted at number seven becoming her best charting single as a lead artist.

Second single, "Don't Hold Your Breath" was produced by Carl Falk, Steve Josefsson (of the Swedish House Mafia) and Rami Yacoub. It was released from March 10, 2011. It peaked at number one on the UK Singles Chart selling 98,000 copies in its first week, and top-five in Ireland. "Don't Hold Your Breath" was released as a digital download in the US in August 2011, it serves as the second US single and impacted US radio on September 20, 2011.

After gaining international attention, "Right There" impacted on UK urban music radio on April 1, 2011, as the album's third UK single. The song was released digitally in the United Kingdom on May 17, 2011. Meanwhile, for its release as the lead single for the US edition of Killer Love, the song was re-recorded to feature two new verses from American rapper 50 Cent. This version of the song was available for purchase at the US iTunes store on May 17, 2011. It peaked on the Billboard Hot 100 at 39, thus becoming her first US single as a lead artist to enter the Hot 100. Scherzinger performed "Right There" live for the first time on American Idol, to coincide with the song's US release.

On July 14, 2011, it was revealed that "Wet" would be released as the album's fourth UK single. On the week of August 20, 2011, it climbed 156 places to peak at number 21 with a lack of sales and has sold over 148,000 copies to date. "Wet" debuted on the Irish Singles Chart at number forty-eight on the week ending August 11, 2011. The following week, August 18, 2011, "Wet" climbed to number 29 on the Irish Singles Chart. The song also peaked at number thirteen on the Scottish Singles Chart.

"Try with Me" was released on October 30, 2011, as the lead single from the European re-release and over-all fifth single from Killer Love. The song and its video made its premiere on October 18, 2011, at Capital FM and MSN.com, respectively. In the United Kingdom, the song debuted at number eighteen on the UK Singles Chart on the issue dated November 12, 2011. It sold 21,315 copies in its first week.

== Track listing ==
Killer Love – Standard edition
No.	Title	Writer(s)	Producer(s)	Length
1.	"Poison"	Nicole Scherzinger; RedOne; Bilal "The Chef" Hajji; Beatgeek; AJ Junior; Kinnda "Kee" Hamid	RedOne; Beatgeek; Jimmy Joker^{[a]}	3:48
2.	"Killer Love"	Scherzinger; RedOne; AJ Junior; Hajji; Beatgeek; Jimmy Joker	RedOne; Beatgeek	3:52
3.	"Don't Hold Your Breath"	Josh Alexander; Billy Steinberg; Toby Gad	Carl Falk; Steve Josefsson; Rami; Alexander^{[b]}; Steinberg^{[b]}	3:17
4.	"Right There"	James Scheffer; Ester Dean; Frank Romano; Daniel Morris	Jim Jonsin; Harvey Mason, Jr.^{[b]}	4:03
5.	"You Will Be Loved"	Timothy Thomas; Theron Thomas; Julian Swirsky	Swirsky; Mason, Jr.^{[b]}	4:16
6.	"Wet"	Mikkel Storleer Eriksen; Tor Erik Hermansen; Sandy Wilhelm; Dean; Traci Hale	Stargate; Sandy Vee	3:37
7.	"Say Yes"	RedOne; Jimmy Joker; Jonas Saeed; Pontus Söderqvist; Nailah Thourbourne; Nyanda Thourbourne; Tasha Thourbourne; Candace Thourbourne	RedOne; Jimmy Joker; Mason, Jr.^{[b]}	3:30
8.	"Club Banger Nation"	RedOne; Hajji; Hamid	RedOne	4:07
9.	"Power's Out" (featuring Sting)	Terius "The-Dream" Nash; Christopher "Tricky" Stewart; Thaddis Harrell	Stewart; Nash; Kuk Harrell^{[b]}	4:08
10.	"Desperate"	Scherzinger; RedOne; Hamid	RedOne	3:28
11.	"Everybody"	Scherzinger; RedOne; Adil Khayat; AJ Junior; Hajji; Jimmy Joker; Beatgeek; Trina Harmon	RedOne; Beatgeek^{[a]}; Jimmy Joker^{[a]}	3:48
12.	"Heartbeat" (Rudi Wells' Open Heart Remix) (Enrique Iglesias featuring Nicole Scherzinger)	Iglesias; Mark Taylor; Jamie Scott	Taylor	3:32
13.	"Casualty"	Matthew Samuals; Andrea England; Liz Rodrigues; Bret Ryan; Zalezy Epstein	Boi 1da; The Maven Boys^{[c]}; Mason, Jr.^{[b]}	4:21
14.	"AmenJena"	Scherzinger; Harmon	Harmon	5:22
Total length:				55:00

Killer Love – French iTunes Store edition (bonus tracks)
No.	Title	Writer(s)	Producer(s)	Length
15.	"Poison" (Glam As You Rock Mix)	Scherzinger; RedOne; The Chef; BeatGeek; AJ Junior; Kinda Hamid	RedOne; BeatGeek; Jimmy Joker	3:41
16.	"Don't Hold Your Breath" (Cahill Mix – Edit)	Josh Alexander; Billy Steinberg; Toby Gad	Carl Falk; Steve Angello; Rami Yacoub	3:04

Killer Love – Australian edition (bonus track)
No.	Title	Writer(s)	Producer(s)	Length
15.	"Right There" (featuring 50 Cent)	Scheffer; Dean; Curtis Jackson; Romano; Morris	Jim Jonsin; Mason, Jr.^{[b]}	4:22

Killer Love – Deluxe edition (bonus tracks)
No.	Title	Writer(s)	Producer(s)	Length
16.	"Try with Me"	Carsten Schack; Sean Hurley; Olivia Nervo; Miriam Nervo	Soulshock	3:56
17.	"Trust Me I Lie"	Diane Warren	Fraser T. Smith; AC Burrell^{[b]}; G'harah "PK" Degeddingseze^{[b]}	3:51
18.	"Tomorrow Never Dies"	Andrew Harr; Jermaine Jackson; Bonnie McKee; Kelly Sheehan; Alex Delicata	The Runners; Mason, Jr.^{[b]}	3:41
Total length:				70:49

Notes

- ^{^a} signifies a co-producer
- ^{^b} signifies a vocal producer
- ^{^c} signifies additional producer
- The demo for "Say Yes" was originally produced by The Cave (Jonas Saeed and Pontus Söderqvist).

== Personnel ==
Adapted from the album booklet.

Performance credits

- Ester Dean – background vocals
- Enrique Iglesias – guest vocals
- 50 Cent – guest vocals
- Nicole Scherzinger – lead vocals, background vocals
- Sting – guest vocals

Art and direction

- Chris Gehringer – mastering
- Stephanie Hsu – creative manager
- Nino Muñoz – photographer
- Julian Peploe Studio – art direction

Technical credits

- Josh Alexander – vocal producer
- BeatGeek – producer, instruments, programming
- Boi-1da – producer
- David Boyd – assistant vocal recorder
- Maven Boys – additional producer
- David Bukovinsky – cello
- Mattias Bylund – strings arranger, stringer recorder, strings editor
- The Cave – original song demo production for "Say Yes"
- Michael Daley – assistant vocal recorder
- Mikkel Erkissen – recording engineer
- Carl Falk – producer
- Chris Garcia – digital editor
- Angela N. Golighty – production coordinator
- Mark "Exit" Goodchild – engineering
- Trina Harmon – producer, vocal producer, pianist
- Kuk Harrell – vocal producer
- Dabbling Harward – additional vocal recorder
- Andrew Hey – vocal recorder
- Ghazi Hourani – assistant recording engineer
- Matt Huber – assistant mixing engineer
- Mattias Johnasson – violinist
- Jimmy Joker – producer, vocal editor, recording engineer
- Jim Jonsin – producer, programmer, keyboards
- Steve Josefsson – producer
- Jaycen Joshua – mixing
- AJ Junior – vocal editor, instruments
- Martin Keirszenbaum – guitars and additional keyboards
- Paul LaMalfa – assistant recording engineer
- Damien Lewis – additional and assistant engineering
- Robert Marks – recording engineer, mixing
- Patrick Mascall – guitarist
- Harvey Mason, Jr. – vocal producer
- Justin Merrill – additional mixing engineer, recording engineer
- Danny Morris – additional keyboards
- Trevor Muzzy – recording engineer, guitarist, vocal editor, mixing, instruments
- Terius "The-Dream" Nash – producer
- Alec Newell – engineering
- Rob Orton – mixing
- Carlos Paucar – vocal recorder
- Dave Pensado – mixing
- Rami – producer
- RedOne – producer, recording engineer, guitarist, instruments, programming, vocal arranger, vocal production
- Frank Romano – guitarist, bass
- Stargate (Mikkel S. Eriksen & Tor E. Hermansen) – producer, instruments
- Billy Steinberg – vocal producer
- C. "Tricky" Stewart – producer
- Mark "Spike" Stent – mixing
- Julian Swirsky – producer
- Phil Tan – mixing
- Marke Taylor – producer, keyboards, programmer
- Jamie Scott & The Town – pianist
- Sandy Vee – producer, recording engineer, mixing, instruments
- Miles Walker – recording engineer
- Stuart White – additional engineer
- Andrew Wuepper – mixing assistant

== Charts ==
=== Weekly charts ===
Weekly chart performance for Killer Love
Chart (2011)	Peak position
Australian Albums (ARIA)	26
Belgian Albums (Ultratop Flanders)	52
Belgian Albums (Ultratop Wallonia)	61
Dutch Albums (Album Top 100)	66
French Albums (SNEP)	57
German Albums (Offizielle Top 100)	85
Irish Albums (IRMA)	14
New Zealand Albums (RMNZ)	34
Scottish Albums (Official Charts)	6
Swiss Albums (Schweizer Hitparade)	55
UK Albums (Official Charts)	8

=== Year-end charts ===
Year-end chart performance for Killer Love
Chart (2011)	Position
UK Albums (OCC)	73

== Certifications ==
Certifications for Killer Love
Region	Certification	Certified units/sales
New Zealand (RMNZ)	Gold	7,500^{‡}
United Kingdom (BPI)	Gold	100,000^{^}
^{^} Shipments figures based on certification alone.^{‡} Sales+streaming figures based on certification alone.

== Release history ==
Release history and formats for Killer Love
Country	Date	Edition	Format	Label
United Kingdom	March 21, 2011	Standard	CD, digital download	Polydor
France	April 25, 2011	Standard	CD, digital download	Polydor
Poland	May 20, 2011	Standard	CD, digital download	Universal
Germany	August 26, 2011	Standard	CD, digital download	Universal
Australia	September 2, 2011	Standard	CD, digital download	Universal
United Kingdom	November 14, 2011	Deluxe	CD, digital download	Polydor
United States	January 7, 2021	Standard, deluxe	Digital download, streaming	Interscope

== See also ==
- List of songs recorded by Nicole Scherzinger
- Nicole Scherzinger discography
