= Scott Warner (lighting designer) =

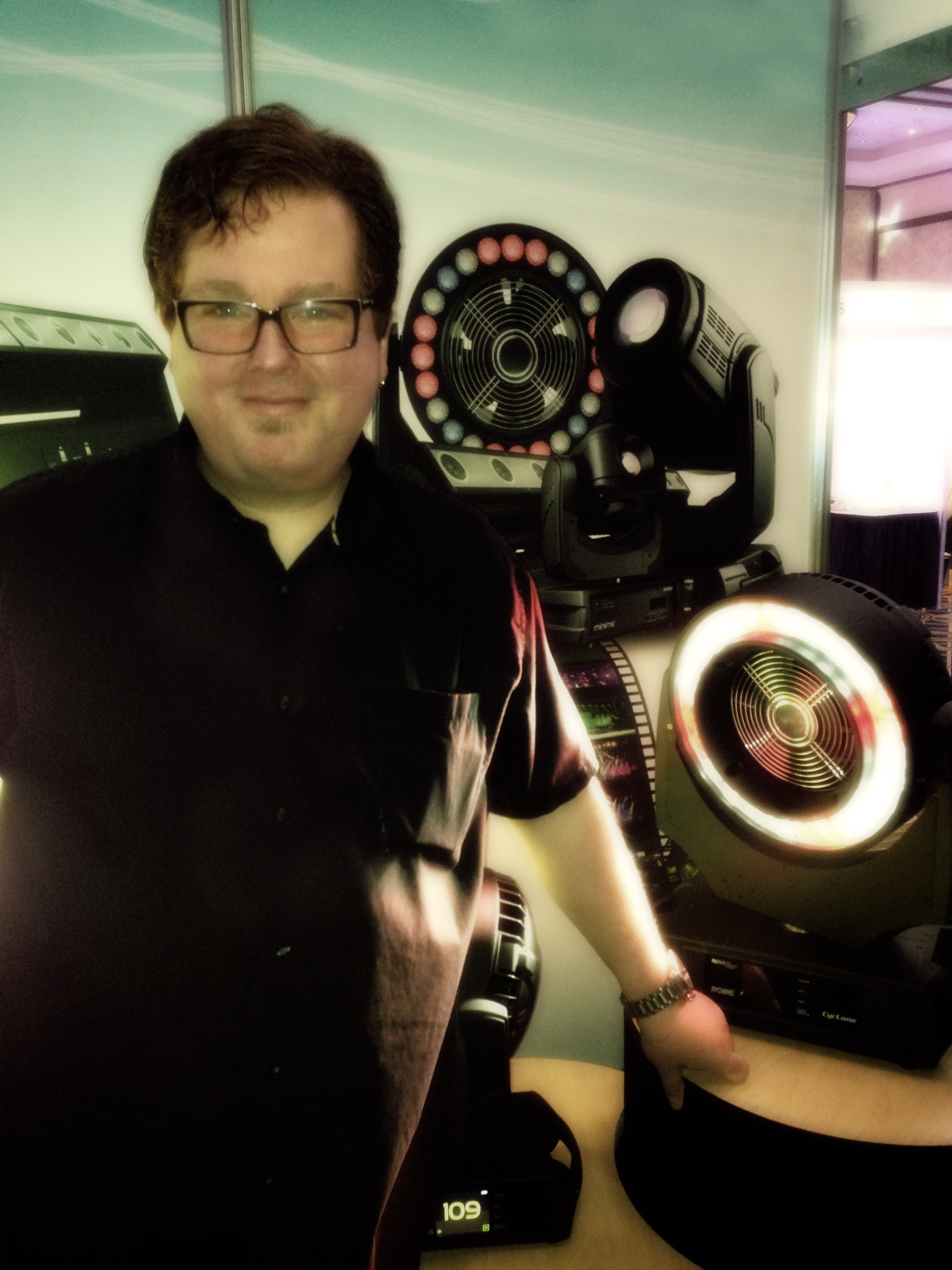

Background information
- Born: Scott Warner
- Origin: Latrobe, Pennsylvania, U.S.
- Occupations: Lighting designer and director, video director
- Years active: 1988–present
- Website: www.karatepinky.com

Scott Warner (born in Latrobe, Pennsylvania) is a U.S.-based lighting designer who has recently designed for Icona Pop, Train, The Pussycat Dolls, Jimmy Eat World, Everclear, David Cook, and Gavin Degraw. Warner started his career is the late 1980s with the Pittsburgh-based bands, The Affordable Floors and The Cynics. His first national client was the shock rock group Gwar.

Scott, whose recent clients included Stone Sour, Erika Jayne, Alice Cooper and The Doobie Brothers is currently working for Queen Latifah, Taylor Dayne, Engelbert_Humperdinck_(singer), and Andy Bell (singer).

== Education and career ==
A student at the Greater Latrobe High School in Latrobe, Pennsylvania, Warner was active in the school's theater program. In 1983, he was a member of the school's production of "Mame."

=== Recording era ===
In the late 1980s and early 1990s, Warner was an Independent Producer and Engineer, recording out of studios in Pittsburgh and New York. His main studio was The Flagrant Underground, a 16 track studio in Pittsburgh that recorded mostly Punk Bands. In 1988 while working for Zanzibar Records, Scott wrote/ performed, and recorded a song titled "Zip It" that he was contracted to write for talk show host Morton Downey Jr. The song was played on Downey's show as well as the Dr. Demento show. Downey endorsed the record, but a dispute with his network forced the label to stop distributing the record. The song can be heard in the film Évocateur: The Morton Downey Jr. Movie.

=== The Robe Robin Cyclone ===
Warner has teamed up with Robe Lighting based in the Czech Republic to create an innovative lighting fixture called The Cyclone. This one of a kind effects moving head product has an integrated fan in the centre of the head surrounded by a ring of 24 x high powered RGBW multichip LEDs. The Cyclone made its live debut with the Swedish group Icona Pop while supporting Miley Cyrus on her 2014 US tour and the UK leg of Katy Perry's 2014 tour.

The Cyclone also made its NLH Hockey debut with the Pittsburgh Penguins during their 2014 season opener. The Cyclone has been used by Kaiser Chiefs, Lady Gaga, Sublime With Rome, Oscar and The Wolf (MIA Awards), The "14-18 Spektakel Musical," Charli XCX, the Trans-Siberian Orchestras "Ghosts Of Christmas Eve" tour, SpaceXperience, BodyGuard Musical, The Blue Man Group in Las Vegas and Alice Cooper's 2019 European Tour.

=== Cyclone award nominations ===
- Nominated for the 2014 "Indispensable Technology in Lighting" Parnelli Award
- Nominated for selection in the PLASA 2013 Awards for Innovation.

== Lighting design and direction clients ==
- The Doobie Brothers
- Andy Bell (singer)
- Taylor Dayne
- Stone Sour
- Lady Gaga (supporting Pussycat Dolls)
- Daughtry
- Tinashe
- Keyshia Cole
- Alice Cooper
- Steve Vai
- Porcelain Black
- Smokey Robinson
- Howie Day
- Train
- Queen Latifah
- The Pussycat Dolls
- Mindless Behavior
- Jimmy Eat World
- Icona Pop
- Vertical Horizon
- Bad Religion
- Gavin Degraw
- Everclear
- Nickelback (supporting Everclear)
- AFI
- David Cook
- Fuel
- Indigo Girls
- Buffalo Tom
- The Misfits (co-headlining with Gwar)
- The Toadies
- Dog's Eye View
- Goo Goo Dolls
- Plastilina Mosh
- Gwar
- MC5 Supporting Alice Cooper
- Black Stone Cherry Supporting Alice Cooper
- Eve Australian 2008 Tour Lighting Designer
- SnoCore Tour 1999 SnoCore Lighting Designer
- INXS VM World Convention 2010
- Sublime with Rome 2013 Tour Design
- Don Henley 2016 European Tour
- Gwen Stefani 2017 Hawaii and Dubai Performances
- Yes (band) 2019 Japanese Tour

== Productions ==
- Gwar "Penguin Attack" Music Video/ Lighting Director
- Gwar "Saddam A-GoGo" Music Video/ Lighting Director
- Carolina Liar "King Of Broken Hearts" Music Video/ Director and Producer
- The Mayfield Four "Sick and Wrong" Music Video/ Director
- Steve Vai "Live At The Astoria" DVD Lighting Director
- The PussyCat Dolls Live from Manchester Evening News Arena Video Lighting Designer/Director
- Everclear "When It All Goes Wrong Again" Video Band Performance Lighting Director
- David Cook "Fade Into Me" Video Lighting Director (live performance)
- Porcelain Black "Mama Forgive Me" Music Video/ Lighting Designer/Director
