= Don't Hold Your Breath =

2011 single by Nicole Scherzinger

Single by Nicole Scherzinger

from the album Killer Love
- Released: March 10, 2011
- Studio: Kinglet (Stockholm, Sweden); Elevator Nobody (Gothenburg, Sweden); Record Plant; MixSuite (Los Angeles, California)
- Genre: Pop; synth-pop
- Length: 3:17
- Label: Interscope
- Songwriters: Josh Alexander; Billy Steinberg; Toby Gad
- Producers: Carl Falk; Steve Josefsson; Rami

Nicole Scherzinger singles chronology
"Poison" (2010)	"Don't Hold Your Breath" (2011)	"Coconut Tree" (2011)

Music video
- "Don't Hold Your Breath" on YouTube

"Don't Hold Your Breath" is a song by American singer Nicole Scherzinger, taken from her debut album, Killer Love (2011). The song began as a demo or reference track by American artists Timbaland and Keri Hilson, which leaked online in June 2010. It went through various iterations and versions which leaked ahead of its release in 2011. The final mixed and mastered version of "Don't Hold Your Breath" was released on March 10, 2011, through Interscope Records, preceding its parent album by one week. "Don't Hold Your Breath" was written by a trio of American songwriters: Josh Alexander, Toby Gad, and Billy Steinberg. It is an empowering independence anthem with lyrics that speak of rebuking the advances of an ex-lover, that features a pop and synth-pop production, with electro-pop beats and Eurodance stylings. Production was courtesy of Carl Falk, Rami and Steve Josefsson.

Many music critics praised the dance-pop, pop music and synth-pop song for its brilliance and anthemic qualities, as well as the conviction and lyrics about independence and freedom. The song was also praised as a worthy successor to Killer Love's prior single "Poison" (2010). "Don't Hold Your Breath" topped the UK Singles Chart, as well as making top-five appearances in Australia and Ireland, and on the Billboard Euro Digital Songs chart. In the United Kingdom, it dethroned "Someone Like You" by Adele only to be replaced by the same song the following week. The former became Scherzinger's third UK chart topper behind her singles "Don't Cha" and "Stickwitu", released as part of the Pussycat Dolls.

On the US Hot Dance Club Songs chart, "Don't Hold Your Breath" was blocked from number one by Jessica Sutta's single "Show Me". As of March 2021, the song had sold over 621,000 copies, and been streamed over 14 million times in the UK, earning it a Platinum certification from the British Phonographic Industry (BPI). In Australia, "Don't Hold Your Breath" earned a 2× Platinum certification from the Australian Recording Industry Association (ARIA). In Cosmopolitan magazine's 'Best Break Up Songs' ranking, the song appeared at number nine, and it also ranked at number 23 on the Huffington Post's 'Top 50 Number Ones of the Last Ten Years' list.

An accompanying music video for was directed by Rich Lee, and follows Scherzinger as she experiences the emotions of the song. Scenes include a hackney carriage journey, self-realisation, scornful glances in the mirror, and wandering around an old house. The visual received generally positive reviews from critics, who described it as one of Scherzinger's most personal music videos to date. "Don't Hold Your Breath" was performed across a variety of TV Shows, including Dancing on Ice, Let's Dance for Comic Relief, and Good Morning America. A number of remixes by DJs and producers were released in support of the song, and it also featured in the setlist for Scherzinger's debut solo concert tour the Killer Love Tour.

== Background and development ==
Following the success of 2010's "Poison", which music critics called "one of last year's most amazing pop surprises", "Don't Hold Your Breath" was unveiled as the second single from Scherzinger's debut album Killer Love in January 2011. Several different demos and unfinished versions of the song would leak ahead of its official release on March 10, 2011. First to leak was a full length demo or reference track by American producer-artist Timbaland and American singer-songwriter Keri Hilson, which had appeared on YouTube in June 2010. According to Muumuse, this version featured "spacey synthesizers and a tripping, hip-hop beat" with Hilson taking on the chorus. It featured on the Tapemasters Inc. The Future Of R&B 33 mixtape. Then on January 5, 2011, a snippet of Scherzinger's version appeared online. At the time, it was thought to have been produced by Moroccan producer RedOne, who had been confirmed to be working on Scherzinger's debut album. This version of the song had a more prominent dance-pop production and layered vocals.

Further iterations of the song would circulate online, including a version with a session/reference vocalist and another unfinished version featuring Scherzinger's vocals. On January 13, 2011, Popjustice attempted to clear up the development of the song, noting that it started off as a song by Timbaland and Keri Hilson called "Hold Your Breath". It was not known at this stage if the song was a demo or simply rejected by the aforementioned artists, but Popjustice noted that a whole new song was written around the refrain, which was sung by an unknown artist and was the version first leaked on January 6. A subsequent version featuring Scherzinger's vocals was leaked on January 12, 2011, however, it was noted that Popjustice had been given the official/final version of the song which had a different production to the leak with Scherzinger's vocals.

== Recording and production ==
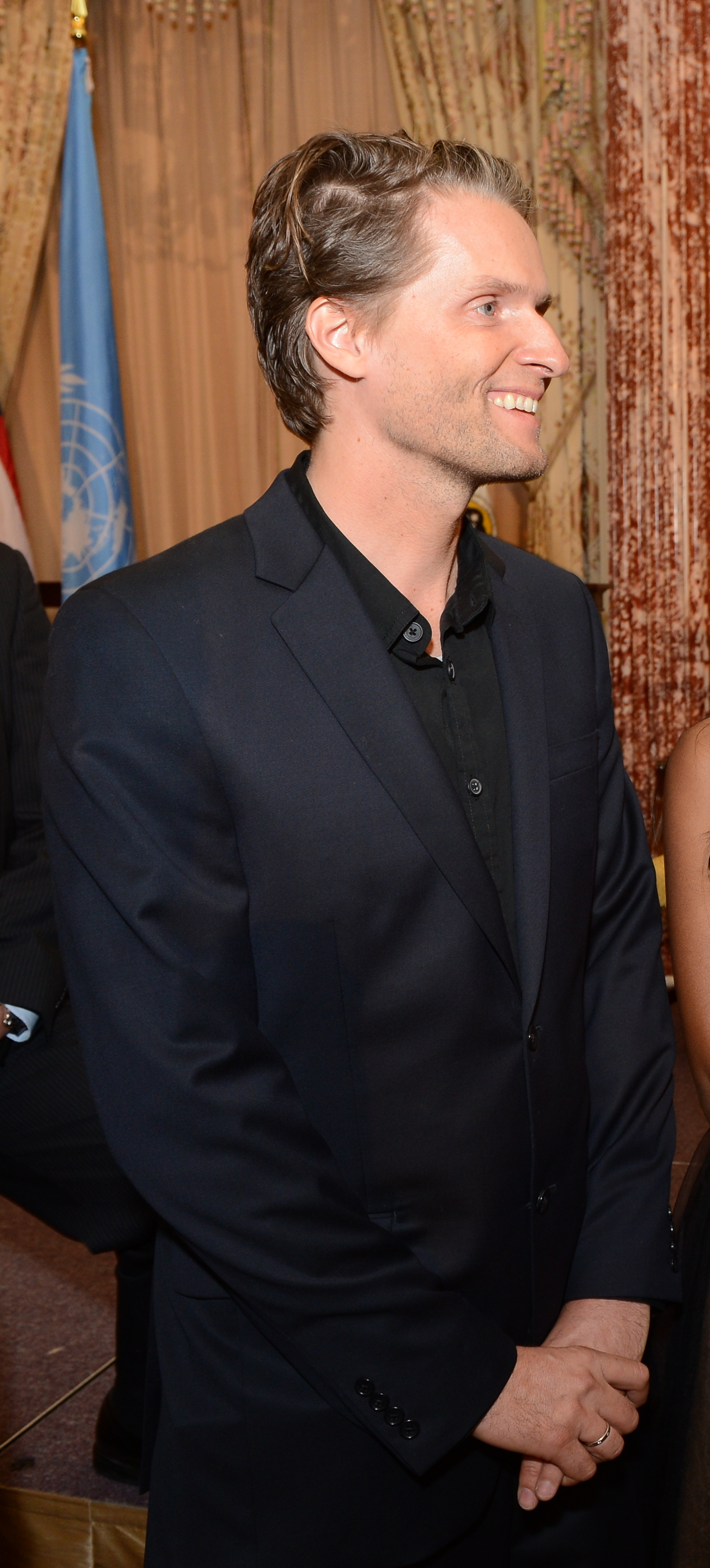
Toby Gad

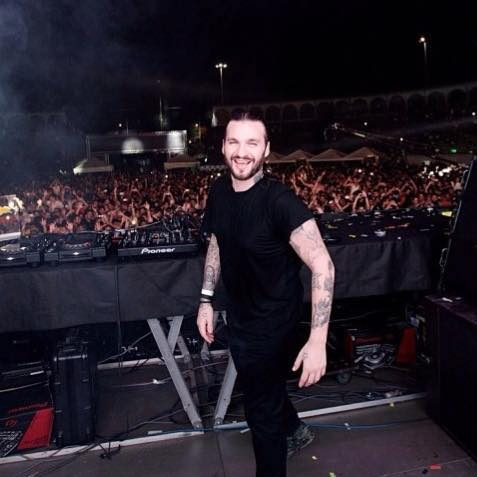
Steve Angello

Toby Gad was involved in co-writing "Don't Hold Your Breath", while Steve Angello helped to produce the song.

"Don't Hold Your Breath" was written by songwriters Josh Alexander, Toby Gad, and Billy Steinberg. At the time of its announcement, the song was incorrectly reported to be produced by American DJ and producer Dave Audé; Swedish trio Carl Falk, Rami (also known as Rami Yacoub), and Steve Josefsson (better known as Steve Angello and as a member of Swedish House Mafia) produced the song at Kinglet Studio in Stockholm, Sweden and, the Record Plant in Los Angeles California. Scherzinger's vocals were produced by Alexander and Steinberg at the Record Plant, while strings were arranged, recorded and edited by Mattias Bylund at Studio Elevator in Gothenburg, Sweden. David Bukovinszky played cello and Mattias Johansson played violin for the song. Popjustice noted that the final mastered version of "Don't Hold Your Breath" only exhibited minor differences to the demo version which circulated ahead of the song's release. The blog noted removal of the "filtery beat noise" and a reduced volume for the "breathy bits" post-chorus. Editing was conducted by Chris Garcia, while renowned audio mixing engineer Mark "Spike" Stent mixed the song at the MixSuite (EastWest Studios) in Los Angeles.

== Music and lyrics ==
Musically, "Don't Hold Your Breath" is a pop and synth-pop song with electropop beats, and stylistic influences from Eurodance. Bradley Stern from MTV Buzzworthy commented that the synth-pop production was typically Swedish, while Stereoboard noted that the song's electro-pop beat was distinctive. "Don't Hold Your Breath" was described by a reviewer for 4Music as a "sort-of-balled-but-not-really", but was not indicative of the rest of the album that was full of "fast 'n' furious club-friendly thumpers" and "proper belters". This sentiment was echoed by The Guardian's Michael Cragg who called the song a "don't-darken-my-door-again" anthem. Robert Copsey of Digital Spy noted that "Don't Hold Your Breath" and "Poison" were "distinctly more pop [and] Eurodance" than Scherzinger's previous releases. According to Musicnotes.com, "Don't Hold Your Breath" consists of an up-tempo common time signature of 112 beats per minute. It uses a simple three-note chord progression of D♭–F_{m}–E♭.

In a later review of the song, after its release, Copsey compared the song to Gloria Gaynor's "I Will Survive" (1978), noting that "Don't Hold Your Breath" was sung with similar conviction, over a finger-snapping chorus. It was not the first time that Scherzinger had a connection to "I Will Survive"; the Pussycat Dolls' last single prior to splitting up in 2009, "Hush Hush; Hush Hush", was remixed to feature a sample of "I Will Survive". Rap-Up described the song as "empowering", saying that in the lyrics, Scherzinger "staves off an ex's advances", and noting that it was her declaration of independence. Lyrics include the lines "You can't touch me now, there's no feeling left/ If you think I'm comin' back, don't hold your breath/ What you did to me, boy I can't forget".

== Release and promotion ==
"Don't Hold Your Breath" officially premiered online on January 14, 2011. Ten days later, the official cover art debuted online too. It features a stylised image of Scherzinger "forward-facing" but off-centre. Pressparty noted that the artwork had an "ethereal appeal" with a prominent blue color palette. Popjustice praised the choice of the color blue, adding that the image demonstrated a hint of personality: "Not a bad thing if you happen to be a popstar." It was playlisted by BBC Radio 1 on February 16, 2011, and was released commercially from March 10, 2011. In the United States, a remix of the song "Right There" featuring 50 Cent was released as the first single from Killer Love on May 17, 2011. "Don't Hold Your Breath" followed as the second American single on August 16, 2011. It was serviced to US contemporary hit radio stations on September 20, 2011.

Scherzinger performed "Don't Hold Your Breath" live for the first time on Dancing on Ice on March 7, 2011, and two days later on Loose Women. On March 20, she performed a medley of "When I Grow Up" and "Don't Hold Your Breath" on the French version of Dancing with the Stars. On May 14, 2011, Scherzinger appeared at BBC Radio 1's Big Weekend, performing "Poison" and "Don't Hold Your Breath" while wearing a leather trenchcoat later revealing a neon bodysuit. On June 11, the singer appeared at Capital FM's Summertime Ball to perform "Don't Hold Your Breath" along with "Right There" and "Poison". She furthered performed the song in the US on July 13, for AMP Radio's Topless Summer Switch Party at Universal CityWalk. On August 18, Scherzinger performed "Don't Hold Your Breath" on Live! with Regis and Kelly. In September 2011, the singer appeared at the iHeartRadio Music Festival, performing "Don't Hold Your Breath" and "Club Banger Nation". On October 12, she performed the song on Good Morning America, as part of its Fall Concert Series. On November 11, Scherzinger performed "Don't Hold Your Breath" on The Tonight Show with Jay Leno with backing from a full band. "Don't Hold Your Breath" was performed as encore for Scherzinger's first solo tour the Killer Love Tour (2012), in support of the 2011 album of the same name.

== Critical reception ==
A reviewer for Popjustice commended Scherzinger for "recording a song that is also basically brilliant", contrasting this against her prior single "Poison". Describing the only "minor quibble" as being the "absence of Nicole letting rip with an earsplitting 'Don't Hold Your Breath!' prior to the track crashing into its final victory lap", the reviewer concluded that the song was "infectiously brilliant", feeling that it made them as excited for Killer Love as "Hold It Against Me" had made them for Britney Spears' then upcoming album Femme Fatale (2011). Idolator's Robbie Daw compared the various demo versions of "Don't Hold You Breath" that had been available online, and concluded that despite not knowing what the officially released version of the song would sound like, "this song already sounds better than every Pussycat Dolls single combined". Copsey commended the song's conviction, saying "consider us told". Stern called the song a "half scathing kiss-off, half asthmatic anthem" and said that he hoped "American audiences should latch onto her follow-up just as quickly as British listeners did across the pond. Just don't forget to exhale!" Years after the song's release, when reviewing another Scherzinger single "On the Rocks" (2014), Helen Ho of Renowned for Sound opined that both "Poison" and "Don't Hold Your Breath" were "upbeat hits". The New Zealand Herald's Kirstin MacFarlane called "Don't Hold Your Breath" one of Killer Love's more enjoyable tracks.

Writing for Stereoboard, Kiran Johal gave the song a negative review, saying that although showing a different side to Scherzinger, it gave fans very little insight into what to expect from Killer Love. Johal also felt that the song might struggle given that the version by Timbaland and Hilson was in the public domain. Johal also felt that the song was more album material rather than "the right level for a second single" and would not reach number one in the charts. Johal would be proven wrong as "Don't Hold Your Breath" would go on to top the UK Singles Chart.

=== Accolades ===
In July 2013, The Huffington Post ranked "Don't Hold Your Breath" at number 23 on its list of the 'Top 50 Number Ones of the Last Ten Years' list. Cosmopolitan listed the song at number nine on the magazine's 'Best Breakup Songs' list. The article also included "I Don't Need a Man" (2006) at number two, which Scherzinger wrote and sang with the Pussycat Dolls.

== Commercial performance ==
"Don't Hold Your Breath" debuted and peaked at number four on the Irish Singles Chart on March 18, 2011. Two days later, it debuted atop the UK Singles Chart with first-week sales of 98,000 copies, becoming Scherzinger's first number-one as a solo artist; the singer had previously topped the charts as a member of the Pussycat Dolls with "Don't Cha" and "Stickwitu" in 2005. At the time of reaching number one, "Don't Hold Your Breath" knocked Adele's "Someone Like You" off the top spot. This feat received coverage from NME and BBC News, but was short-lived as "Someone Like You" would return to the top spot the following week. "Don't Hold Your Breath" would later be certified Platinum by the British Phonographic Industry (BPI), denoting sales and streams of 600,000 in the UK. By March 2021, it had sold over 621,000 copies and been streamed over 14 million times in the UK. "Don't Hold Your Breath" also peaked at number one on the Scottish Singles Chart and performed moderately elsewhere in Europe, peaking at number 44 in the Netherlands, number 45 in France, and number 62 in Switzerland.

Outside of Europe, "Don't Hold Your Breath" reached number 21 in New Zealand. In Australia, the song debuted at number 27, becoming Scherzinger's second single to enter the charts since "Baby Love" (2007). "Don't Hold Your Breath" peaked at number 17 and was certified double platinum by the Australian Recording Industry Association (ARIA) for selling over 140,000 copies in Australia. Following its release in the United States, the song entered and peaked at number 86 on the Billboard Hot 100 chart. On the Hot Digital Songs chart, the song entered at number 61, selling 26,000 copies in its opening week. On the US Hot Dance Club Play chart "Don't Hold Your Breath" fared better, peaking at number two, being held off of the top spot by Scherzinger's former bandmate Jessica Sutta's "Show Me".

== Music video ==
On January 18, 2011, Scherzinger booked Rich Lee to direct the music video for "Don't Hold Your Breath". The finished clip premiered through Scherzinger's official Vevo account, on February 8, 2011. According to Daw, the theme of the video was to show drama and anger.

=== Synopsis ===
The music video begins with Scherzinger sitting in the back of a London hackney carriage. As the rain pours outside and raindrops cover the windows, she sings the first verse while changing her smart clothes for more casual ones. The singer stares longingly out of the carriage's window, watching the rain outside. During the refrain, there are two main scenes. In the first, Scherzinger is seen wrapped in a blanket, while in the second she walks across the room of an old house, in need of renovation. The lighting is cold and dim, and most of the furniture is covered in plastic wrap. Scherzinger stares resentfully at her surroundings while crossing the room. In the second verse, the signer stands in front of a mirror in the bathroom of the house, where she has a moment of realisation. After turning the taps on for a while, the sink overflows as she scornfully looks in the mirror, relating to the lyrics of the song. She is then seen walking toward the camera, through a hallway of the house. It is a confident independent walk towards the audience with lights flashing rhythmically behind her. The bridge sees the singer sitting in one the house's empty rooms, in an old armchair, and intersects some of the earlier carriage and bathroom scenes. As she sings the lyric: 'The screen fades to black', the blanket seen earlier on falls in front of the camera, revealing a close-up shot of Scherzinger's face. Her hair flows in the wind and she finally gets up from the armchair to stand in front of the room's open windows. In the final scene, the singer stands confidently in front of the window as wind and light flood the room. She sings the final verse of the song, looking directly at the camera and smiling for the first time in the video.

=== Reception ===
Despite Daw loving the song, he had little to say about the music video, "overall, cheap-ass video, but great pop song. Two kitty paws up, Nicole." Meanwhile, Devin of Rap-Up called Scherzinger's character, in the video, a "sexy siren". A reviewer from sugarscape.com said the video for "Don't Hold Your Breath" was similar to that for Cheryl Cole's "The Flood" (2011), as both were "dark and weepy". Moreover, the reviewer "praised the warm fuzzy" blanket scene, the "being stroppy around the house", and the "sexy tantrum" at the end of the video. MTV reported that "Don't Hold Your Breath" was one of the most watched music videos on its website in 2011.

== Track listings ==
Digital single

1. "Don't Hold Your Breath" – 3:17

UK digital single

1. "Don't Hold Your Breath" – 3:18
2. "Don't Hold Your Breath" (instrumental version) – 3:18

Digital single (acoustic version)

1. "Don't Hold Your Breath" (Engine Room acoustic session) – 3:05

Digital remix EP1

1. "Don't Hold Your Breath" (Cahill club mix) – 5:27
2. "Don't Hold Your Breath" (Cahill mix – edit) – 3:04
3. "Don't Hold Your Breath" (Bimbo Jones radio edit) – 2:42
4. "Don't Hold Your Breath" (Bimbo Jones dub edit) – 7:03
5. "Don't Hold Your Breath" (The Alias radio mix) – 3:10
6. "Don't Hold Your Breath" (The Alias club mix) – 5:28

Digital remix EP2

1. "Don't Hold Your Breath" (main version) – 3:18
2. "Don't Hold Your Breath" (Kat Krazy radio remix) – 3:08
3. "Don't Hold Your Breath" (Dave Audé radio remix) – 3:33
4. "Don't Hold Your Breath" (Fred Falke radio remix) – 3:43
5. "Don't Hold Your Breath" (Kaskade radio remix) – 3:49
6. "Don't Hold Your Breath" (Dave Audé remix) – 7:16
7. "Don't Hold Your Breath" (Fred Falke remix) – 7:08
8. "Don't Hold Your Breath" (Olav Basoski remix) – 6:10

Digital EP – The Remixes

1. "Don't Hold Your Breath" (Kaskade remix) – 5:22
2. "Don't Hold Your Breath" (Olav Basoski remix) – 6:10
3. "Don't Hold Your Breath" (Fred Falke remix) – 7:08
4. "Don't Hold Your Breath" (Dave Audé remix) – 7:16
5. "Don't Hold Your Breath" (Kat Krazy remix) – 4:09

== Credits and personnel ==
Credits are adapted from the album booklet and liner notes.

Recording and mixing

- Music recorded at Kinglet Studio in Stockholm, Sweden
- Strings recorded and edited at Studio Elevator Nobody in Gothenburg, Sweden
- Music and vocals recorded at The Record Plant in Los Angeles, California
- Mixed at the Mixsuite (EastWest Studios) in Los Angeles, California

Personnel

- Josh Alexander – vocal producer
- David Bukovinszky – cello
- Mattias Bylund – arranger (strings), recording engineer (strings), editor (strings)
- Carl Falk – producer
- Chris Garcia – digital editor
- Mattias Johansson – violin
- Steve Josefsson (Note: Steve Josefsson is better known by his professional moniker Steve Angello) – producer
- Rami (Note: Rami is better known by his professional moniker Rami Yacoub) – producer
- Nicole Scherzinger – lead vocals
- Billy Steinberg – vocal producer
- Mark "Spike" Stent – mixing

== Charts ==
=== Weekly charts ===
Weekly chart performance for "Don't Hold Your Breath"
Chart (2011)	Peak position
Australia (ARIA)	17
Australia Dance (ARIA)	6
Austria (Ö3 Austria Top 40)	65
Belgium (Ultratip Bubbling Under Flanders)	2
Belgium (Ultratop 50 Wallonia)	42
Canada Hot 100 (Billboard)	70
CIS Airplay (TopHit)	71
Croatia (HRT)	14
Czech Republic Airplay (ČNS IFPI)	36
Euro Digital Songs (Billboard)	2
France (SNEP)	45
Hungary (Rádiós Top 40)	39
Ireland (IRMA)	4
Netherlands (Dutch Top 40)	15
New Zealand (Recorded Music NZ)	21
Romania (Romanian Top 100)	68
Scottish Singles Sales (Official Charts)	1
Slovakia Airplay (ČNS IFPI)	11
Switzerland (Schweizer Hitparade)	62
UK Singles (Official Charts)	1
US Billboard Hot 100	86
US Dance Club Songs (Billboard)	2
US Pop Airplay (Billboard)	32

=== Year-end charts ===
Year-end chart performance for "Don't Hold Your Breath"
Chart (2011)	Position
Australia (ARIA)	80
Australia Dance (ARIA)	20
UK Singles (OCC)	33
US Hot Dance Club Songs (Billboard)	43

== Certifications ==
Certifications for "Don't Hold Your Breath"
Region	Certification	Certified units/sales
Australia (ARIA)	2× Platinum	140,000^{^}
United Kingdom (BPI)	Platinum	621,000 (Note: According to the Official Charts Company, as of March 2021, "Don't Hold Your Breath" had amassed chart sales of 621,000 and been streamed over 14 million times.)
^{^} Shipments figures based on certification alone.

== Release history ==
Release dates and formats for "Don't Hold Your Breath"
Region	Date	Format(s)	Label	Ref.
Ireland	March 10, 2011	Digital download; streaming	Universal Music	
Ireland	March 11, 2011	Digital download; streaming	Universal Music	
Portugal	March 13, 2011	Digital download; streaming	Universal Music	
Singapore	March 13, 2011	Digital download; streaming	Universal Music	
United Kingdom	March 13, 2011	Digital download; streaming	Polydor Records	
Europe	March 2011 (Note: "Don't Hold Your Breath" was released in France and Sweden on March 14, Luxembourg on March 21, Spain on March 23, Norway on March 24, and in Italy and the Netherlands on March 25.)	Digital download; streaming	Universal Music	
New Zealand	April 11, 2011	Digital download; streaming	Universal Music	
Australia	June 3, 2011	Digital download; streaming	Universal Music	
Germany	June 3, 2011	Digital download; streaming	Universal Music	
North America	August 16, 2011	Digital download; streaming	Interscope Records	
United States	September 20, 2011	Contemporary hit radio	Interscope Records	

== See also ==
- List of number-one singles from the 2010s (UK)
- List of artists who reached number one on the UK Singles Downloads Chart
- List of UK top-ten singles in 2011
- List of UK Singles Chart number ones of the 2010s
