= Poison (Nicole Scherzinger song) =

2010 single by Nicole Scherzinger

Single by Nicole Scherzinger

from the album Killer Love
- Released: October 25, 2010
- Recorded: 2010
- Studio: Koryland (Barcelona, Spain); Solid Sound (Nice, France)
- Genre: Dance-pop; electropop
- Length: 3:48
- Label: Interscope
- Songwriters: Nicole Scherzinger; RedOne; Bilal "The Chef"; Beatgeek; AJ Junior; Kinnda "Kee" Hamid
- Producers: RedOne; Beatgeek; Jimmy Joker

Nicole Scherzinger singles chronology
"Heartbeat" (2010)	"Poison" (2010)	"Don't Hold Your Breath" (2011)

Music video
- "Poison" on YouTube

"Poison" is a song recorded by American singer-songwriter Nicole Scherzinger for her debut solo studio album, Killer Love (2011). Released on October 25, 2010, it is the first single from the album. It was produced by RedOne, BeatGeek and Jimmy Joker, and is distinctively different from Scherzinger's previous attempts at releasing solo material. "Poison" is backed with powerful synthesizers and a pulsing dance-pop beat. The single was released as a two-track digital download and as a seven-track remixes extended play (EP).

"Poison" has received mostly positive reviews from most music critics who praised her new sound and the energy on the record but some criticized the song for being too generic. Scherzinger performed "Poison" live for the first time on the seventh series of The X Factor on November 28, 2010, to coincide with the song's UK release. Both the show's judges and studio audiences gave her a standing ovation, with the media later praising her energy, choreography and live vocals.

An accompanying music video, directed by Joseph Kahn, sees Scherzinger take on the role of a female superhero and switches between a good-girl and bad-girl persona. It was noted for its similarities to another Kahn-directed video, "Toxic" by Britney Spears. "Poison" peaked at number three on the UK Singles Chart becoming Scherzinger's second most successful single as a solo artist, in addition to peaking at number seven in Ireland, where it also became one of her highest-charting releases. The single reached number one in Scotland, which was Scherzinger's first solo number one worldwide.

== Background ==
In 2007, Scherzinger was planning to launch her debut album under the title Her Name is Nicole, however, the release of four singles, including "Whatever U Like" (featuring T.I.) and "Baby Love" (featuring will.i.am) all failed to significantly impact on US charts. "Baby Love" was moderately successful reaching top-twenty in Europe. After a number of pushbacks, the entire project was scrapped at the request of Scherzinger. In May 2010, Rap-Up reported that Scherzinger was relaunching her solo career with an "empowering" ballad called "Nobody Can Change Me". The song was recorded in a nighttime studio session while she was competing on season 10 of the U.S. reality competition, Dancing with the Stars, and was mastered on May 23, 2010, ready for its premiere on Ryan Seacrest's KIIS FM radio show the following day. Idolator was unimpressed with the "treacly pop tune" saying that the lack of sexiness, "uninspiring message" and "squeaky vocals" did Scherzinger no favors. However, Amos Barshad of New York magazine actually liked the song, stating that "there’s none of the Pussycat Doll’s forced sexiness here; instead, it sounds like something that could have just missed the final cut on a Kelly Clarkson album (that is sort of supposed to be a compliment, yeah)."

Then in August 2010, Moroccan producer RedOne was interviewed by the BBC. In the interview, he revealed he had been working on Scherzinger's album. "I just finished her album. Her last one never came out because it was collecting hamburgers, like fast food. One from McDonald's, one from Burger King, and so on. It tasted good, but it wasn't consistent. Her new record – people are really going to go crazy about it because it's the real her." Scherzinger's boyfriend Lewis Hamilton selected "Poison" as the album's first single. It debuted on her official YouTube account on October 14, 2010.

== Composition ==
: "Poison"
A sample of "Poison"'s pulsating chorus, where accompanied by a toxic beat, Scherzinger sings about "bad-girl power" and "poisonous intentions".

"Poison" is an uptempo dance-pop song produced by RedOne, BeatGeek and Jimmy Joker. It was written by Scherzinger, Bilal Hajji, Kinda Hamid, Novel Jannusi, Achraf Jannusi, RedOne in the musical key of A-minor. With a guitar-driven melody, "Poison" uses a pulsating and toxic beat throughout, which is similar to that used in the Britney Spears song, "Toxic". The lyrics were also compared to "Toxic" and said to have similar themes, according to BBC Music blogger, Fraser McAlpine. A reviewer from Rap-Up spoke of the song's overall theme. "The lead Pussycat Doll has thoughts of using a deadly elixir on the dance floor, singing through a fuzzy filter over bombastic synthesizers." They described the song as a "toxic pop gem". According to the sheet music published at Musicnotes.com by Sony/ATV Music Publishing, the song has a time signature set in common time, with a tempo of 124 beats per minute. The melody is mainly composed with piano and guitar instruments.

== Critical reception ==
Bridget Daley of Hollyscoop was impressed with the song saying, "It’s super beat, and now we understand what RedOne meant when he told Hollyscoop how much we were going to love Nicole’s 'new' sound!" However, Becky Bain of Idolator thought the "pulsating dance song" was underwhelming. "We have to admit, we’re not bowled over by this one, which pretty much follows a standard, predictable dance-pop formula from the double shout-out at the start to the 'woosh'ing fade-out finish". However Bain also pointed out that current trends on the US Billboard Hot 100 were unpredictable, "then again, since when has the Hot 100 shyed away from generic pop tunes we’ve heard over and over again? This one could go either way, folks."

Fraser McAlpine of BBC Music stated that he thought the song was not as good as "Toxic" by Britney Spears but was incredibly similar. After dubbing it a weaker version of "Toxic", he said, "And that just leaves us here with a song ['Poison'] which is all stomp and huff, a dramatic bang of a thing, which seeks to drag all the bad girls to the dancefloor so they can holler their evil intentions to into the faces of nervous men. It's a song which makes the most of Nicole's unwholesome sexiness – as opposed to wholesome, you understand, I'm not saying there's anything gross about her – and has drama and fury on its side." Nick Levine of Digital Spy agreed saying that "Scherzinger has managed to bag herself a banger of an (ahem) debut single". He described the song's busy production as "having a whiff of the Berline "teknoklub" that is a "racket in the best possible way". Levine also praised Scherzinger for her conviction on the song, awarding it five out of five stars. He gave "Poison" a better reception than he awarded Scherzinger's previous attempt, "Baby Love" (2007), which he only awarded three out of five stars, stating that it was the wrong single to launch the career of a world-class superstar.

== Chart performance ==
Following Scherzinger's performance on series seven of The X Factor, The Official Charts Company tipped "Poison" as a contender for number one on the UK Singles Chart. Then on December 11, 2010, the single debuted at number one on the Scottish Singles Chart. Additionally "Poison" made its UK chart debut at number three with first-week sales of 67,425, thus becoming her first top ten single in the UK, as a solo artist. It also peaked at number two on the UK Digital Singles chart. The song has been certified silver by the British Phonographic Industry (BPI) for shipments of 200,000 copies of the single. In Ireland, the single debuted at number seven. "Poison" also charted at number nineteen on the Slovak Airplay Chart.

== Music video ==
Two frames showing the good-girl (upper) and bad-girl (lower) personas that Scherzinger takes on in the video for "Poison"

The music video for "Poison" was filmed over one day in an empty warehouse in Los Angeles, with Joseph Kahn serving as the director and Rich & Tone as the choreographers. the music video for "Poison" features Scherzinger "sporting a skin-tight ninja outfit as she dance-fights with baddies." The video's superhero theme has been compared to Kahn's "Toxic" music video for Britney Spears.

The video begins on a city sidewalk where Scherzinger walks into a telephone booth as several men in black suits pass by the booth. As Scherzinger begins to undress, the men stop to stare as she begins taking off her glasses and shaking her hair back. The video then moves to Scherzinger in a dress walking past four men mopping the floor to a supply closet where she enters and reappears moments later, dressed in a black body suit with a cape. As the chorus begins, the situation rapidly switches back-and-forth from Scherzinger in her good-girl persona shown fighting escaped jail prisoners dressed in striped suits (and Beagle Boys masks) to Scherzinger in her bad-girl persona fighting with police. As the song progresses, Scherzinger is shown in a classic looking automobile and riding a BMW motorcycle, with a streaking white and black background. Several shots of her bad-girl persona alone in a room with two prisoners are then shown. As the bridge begins, she is shown in her good-girl ego standing by a podium, talking to a group of reporters while waving her hands in the air. As the bridge ends, she brings her hands down, blowing back all of the reporters, who then begin dancing and pumping their arms to the song. The video moves to Scherzinger dancing with the police and prisoners before ending with her blowing away the two men who were in the room with her and walking away.

MTV's Gil Kaufman called the video "slinky". Robbie Daw from Idolator, said that "[we were] unsure about [...] 'Poison' when it first surfaced. But now that it’s been fitted with a somewhat stylish Joseph Kahn video, it’s all sort of starting to fall into place. 'Poison' video is super hot trash on a budget. .. But giving people with this much guilty pleasure in four minutes is just plain priceless." French magazine Musique Mag, said that "[...] varying scenes, and fighting against thugs become [a] frenzied choreography."

== Live performances ==
Scherzinger performed "Poison", live for the first time, on November 28, 2010, during the week eight results show on series seven of The X Factor UK. She wore a red catsuit and long black trenchcoat for the performance. On The Xtra Factor following the live performances, Louis Walsh and Simon Cowell praised Scherzinger's performance, respectively calling it "one of the best live guest performances we've ever had" and "if you want an example of how you do it right... its Nicole. It was focus, performance, vocals...". Elena Gorgan of Softpedia agreed to say that Scherzinger wowed the "explosive" performance, earning her a standing ovation from the judges and audience. The following day, she reprised the performance on ITV's breakfast show, Daybreak before heading to London's Westfield Shopping Centre where she appeared on live screens to promote sports brand Reebok. She stayed in the UK until December 5, 2010, promoting the single.

== Track listings ==
- Digital download
1. "Poison" (New Main Version) – 3:47
2. "Poison" (Instrumental) – 3:47
- Digital download (UK Remixes Version)
1. "Poison" (Alternate Radio Version) – 3:48
2. "Poison" (Cahill Club Mix) – 6:31
3. "Poison" (Cahill Rockstar Dub Mix) – 6:32
4. "Poison" (Dave Audé Radio) – 3:51
5. "Poison" (Dave Audé Venomous Club) – 7:51
6. "Poison" (Guy Furious Monster Uptempo Remix) – 3:32
7. "Poison" (Manufactured Superstars Vocal Remix) – 5:30
- Digital download (France Remixes Version)
1. "Poison" (New Main Version) – 3:48
2. "Poison" (Dave Audé Radio) – 3:51
3. "Poison" (Glam As You Radio Mix) – 3:41
4. "Poison" (Cahill Club / Main Edit) – 3:32
5. "Poison" (Guy Furious Monster Uptempo Remix) – 3:32
6. "Poison" (Manufactured Superstars Vocal Remix) – 5:30
7. "Poison" (Dave Audé Venomous Club) – 7:51
8. "Poison" (Glam As You Club Mix) – 6:44
9. "Poison" (Cahill Club Mix) – 6:30
- Digital download (UK Nokia Version)
1. "Poison" (Guy Furious Urban Venom Radio Remix) – 3:57

== Credits and personnel ==
- Nicole Scherzinger – songwriter and vocals
- RedOne – songwriter, producer, recording, engineer, guitar, instruments, programming and vocal arrangement
- Bilal Hajji – songwriter
- BeatGeek – songwriter, producer, instruments and programming
- AJ Junior – songwriter and vocal editing
- Kinda "Kee" Hamid – songwriter
- Jimmy Joker – co-producer and vocal editing
- Trevor Muzzy – recording, engineer, guitar and vocal editing
- Robert Orton – audio mixing
- Chris Gehringer – mastering

Credits adapted from Killer Love booklet liner notes.

== Charts ==
=== Weekly charts ===
Chart (2010)	Peak position
Belgium (Ultratip Bubbling Under Wallonia)	15
Euro Digital Song Sales (Billboard)	7
CIS Airplay (TopHit)	127
Ireland (IRMA)	7
Scottish Singles Sales (Official Charts)	1
Slovakia Airplay (ČNS IFPI)	2
UK Singles (Official Charts)	3

=== Year-end charts ===
Chart (2010)	Position
UK Singles (Official Charts Company)	152

== Certifications ==
Region	Certification	Certified units/sales
United Kingdom (BPI)	Silver	200,000^{^}
^{^} Shipments figures based on certification alone.

== Release history ==
Country	Date	Format	Label	Ref.
Singapore	October 25, 2010	Digital download	Universal	
Sweden	October 25, 2010	Digital download	Universal	
Ireland	November 25, 2010	Digital download (UK Remixes Version)	Universal	
Portugal	November 25, 2010	Digital download	Universal	
Ireland	November 26, 2010	Digital download	Universal	
United Kingdom	November 28, 2010	Digital download	Polydor	
United Kingdom	November 28, 2010	Digital download (UK Remixes Version)	Polydor	
Norway	November 29, 2010	Digital download	Universal	
France	December 10, 2010	Digital download	Universal	
France	December 13, 2010	Digital download (UK Remixes Version)	Universal	
Netherlands	December 17, 2010	Digital download	Universal	
Spain	December 20, 2010	Digital download	Universal	
France	January 3, 2011	Digital download (France Remixes Version)	Universal	
Germany	January 28, 2011	Digital download	Universal	

== See also ==
- Nicole Scherzinger discography
- List of songs recorded by Nicole Scherzinger
