= 2015 Birthday Honours =

British government recognitions

The 2015 Queen's Birthday Honours were appointments by some of the 16 Commonwealth realms of Queen Elizabeth II to various orders and honours to reward and highlight good works by citizens of those countries. The Birthday Honours were awarded as part of the Queen's Official Birthday celebrations during the month of June. The Queen's Birthday Honours were announced on 1 June 2015 in New Zealand, on 8 June in Australia, and on 12 June in the United Kingdom, in Bahamas, Cook Islands, Grenada, Papua New Guinea, Solomon Islands, Tuvalu, Saint Lucia and Belize.

The recipients of honours are displayed as they were styled before their new honour. They are arranged by the country (in order of precedence) whose ministers advised the Queen on the appointments, then by honour with grades, i.e. Knight/Dame Grand Cross, Knight/Dame Commander etc., and then by divisions, i.e. Civil, Diplomatic and Military as appropriate.

== United Kingdom ==
Below are the individuals appointed by Elizabeth II in her right as Queen of the United Kingdom with honours within her own gift, and with the advice of the Government for other honours.

=== Member of the Order of the Companions of Honour (CH) ===
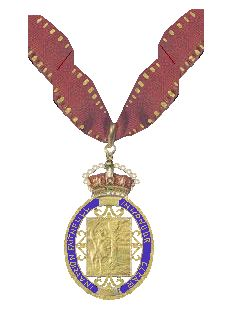
The riband and badge of a Member of the Order of the Companions of Honour

- Sir Neville Marriner CBE – Conductor. For services to Music.
- The Rt Hon. The Lord Woolf PC FBA – For services to the public and community relations.

=== Knight Bachelor ===
- Henry Angest – National Treasurer, Conservative Party. For political service.
- Prof. Harshad Bhadeshia FRS FREng – Tata Steel Professor of Metallurgy, University of Cambridge. For services to Science and Technology.
- The Rt Hon. Simon Burns MP – Member of Parliament for Chelmsford. For parliamentary and political service.
- Dr. Philip Campbell – Editor in Chief, Nature. For services to Science.
- Prof. Christopher Clark, Regius Professor of History, University of Cambridge. For services to British German relations.
- Dr. Kevan Arthur Collins – Chief Executive, Education Endowment Foundation. For services to Education.
- Dr. Naim Dangoor CBE – Philanthropist. For charitable services.
- Michael "Mick" Davis – Chair, Prime Minister's Holocaust Commission. For services to Holocaust Commemoration and Education.
- Ciarán Devane – Lately Chief Executive, Macmillan Cancer Support. For services to Cancer Patients.
- Prof. Charles Downes OBE FRSE – Principal and Vice-Chancellor, University of Dundee. For services to Higher Education and Life Sciences.
- Gareth Edwards CBE – For services to Sport and for charitable services.
- Bernard Gray – Chief of Defence Materiel, Ministry of Defence. For public service, particularly to Defence.
- Patrick Head FREng – Lately Director, Williams Hybrid Power Ltd. For services to Motorsport.
- Lenworth "Lenny" George Henry CBE – Actor and Comedian. For services to Drama and charity.
- The Rt Hon. Simon Hughes – Lately Member of Parliament for Bermondsey and Old Southwark. For public and political service.
- Tom Jeffery CB – Lately Director General, Department for Education, Children's Services and Departmental Strategy Directorate. For services to the Department for Education.
- Dr. Karl Jenkins CBE – Composer. For services to Composing and Crossing Musical Genres.
- Paul Kenny – general secretary, GMB Union. For service to Trade Unions.
- Dr. James MacMillan CBE – Composer and Conductor. For services to Music
- Frank McLoughlin CBE – Principal, City and Islington College and Chair, Commission on Adult Vocational Teaching and Learning. For services to Further Education.
- Iain McMillan CBE – For services to the Scottish Economy.
- George Ivan "Van" Morrison OBE – For services to the Music Industry and to Tourism in Northern Ireland.
- Prof. Stephen Nickell CBE FBA – Economist. For services to Economics.
- Dr. Nicholas Penny – Director, National Gallery. For services to the Arts.
- Prof. Munir Pirmohamed – David Weatherall Chair of Medicine, University of Liverpool. For services to Medicine.
- Gary Verity – Chief Executive, Welcome to Yorkshire. For services to Tourism and the Tour De France Grand Depart 2014.
- Prof. Ian Weller – Emeritus Professor of Sexually Transmitted Diseases, Department of Infection and Population Health. For services to HIV Research.
- Nicholas Weller – Executive Principal, Dixons Academies, Bradford. For services to Education.
- Adrian White CBE DL – For services to International Trade and Investment.
- Andreas Whittam Smith CBE – For public service, particularly to the Church of England.

=== The Most Honourable Order of the Bath ===
==== Knight / Dame Grand Cross of the Order of the Bath (GCB) ====
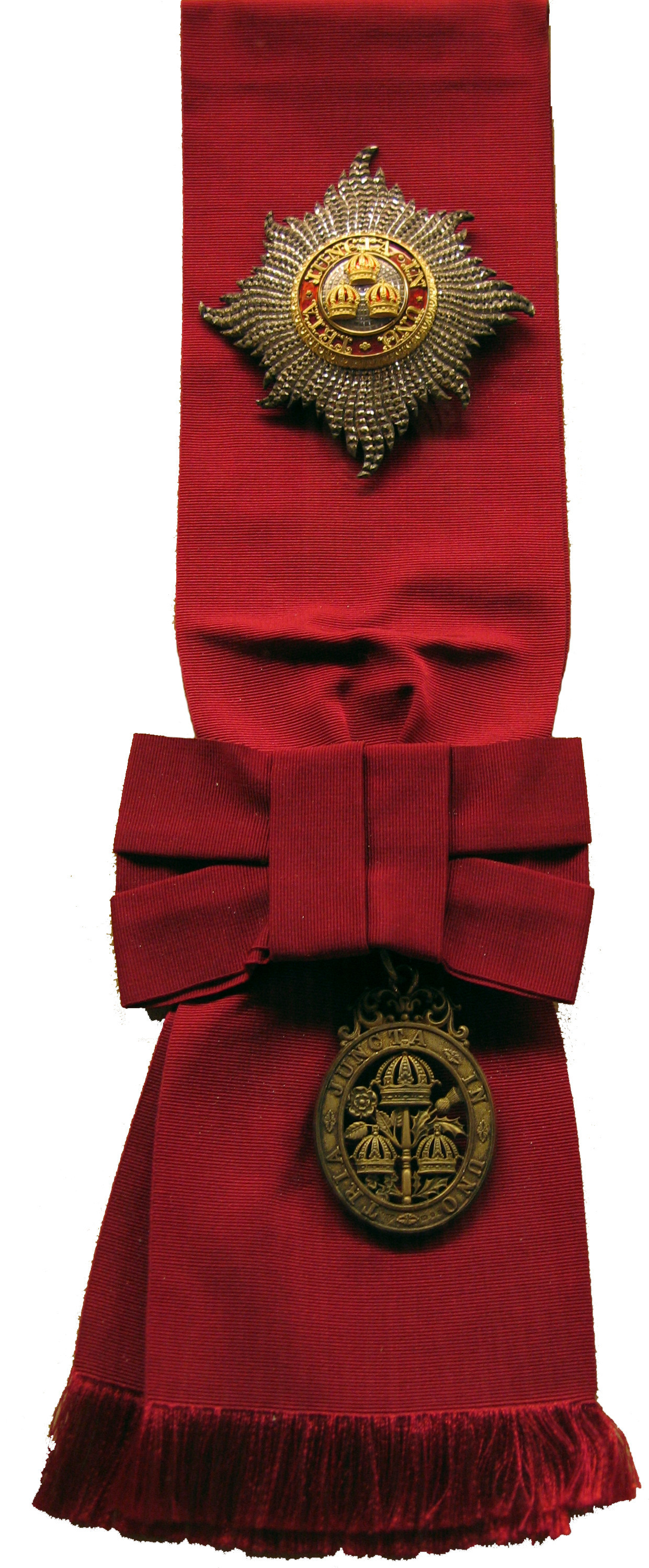
Sash and star of the Order of the Bath, Grand Cross, civil division

Civil

- Sir Nicholas Macpherson KCB – Permanent Secretary, HM Treasury. For public service.

==== Knight / Dame Commander of the Order of the Bath (KCB / DCB) ====
Civil

- Una O'Brien CB – Permanent Secretary, Department of Health. For public service, particularly to Healthcare.

==== Companion of the Order of the Bath (CB) ====
Military

- Maj-Gen David Mark Cullen OBE – late Royal Regiment of Artillery, 513865.
- AVM Peter Ronald Ewen – Royal Air Force, 8020332E.
- AVM Graham Peter Farnell OBE – Royal Air Force, 8174906P.
- RAdm Timothy Peter Fraser – C030314S
- RAdm Clive Charles Carruthers Johnstone CBE – C032594H
- Lt-Gen Philip David Jones CBE – late The Royal Anglian Regiment, 511036.
- Lt-Gen Gordon Kenneth Messenger DSO OBE – Royal Marines, N027960S.
- AVM Aroop Kumar Mozumder – Royal Air Force, 5206551S.

Civil

- Dawn Brodrick – Director, People, Capability and Change, Department for Communities and Local Government. For services to Public Administration.
- William Haire – Permanent Secretary, Department for Social Development, Northern Ireland Executive. For services to Government in Northern Ireland.
- Conrad Prince – Director-General, Foreign and Commonwealth Office. For services to British foreign policy.
- Oliver Robbins – Director-General, Civil Service, Cabinet Office. For public service.
- Jacqueline Sharpe – Acting Clerk Assistant, House of Commons. For parliamentary service.
- Helen Shirley-Quirk – Director, Emergency Preparedness, Resilience and Response, Department of Health. For services to Public Health Protection.
- Patsy Wilkinson MBE – Ministry of Defence. For services to Defence.
- Peter Worrall OBE – Chief of Materiel (Joint Enablers), Ministry of Defence. For services to Defence.

=== The Most Distinguished Order of Saint Michael and Saint George ===
==== Knight / Dame Commander of the Order of Saint Michael and Saint George (KCMG / DCMG) ====
- Dr Andrew John Pocock CMG – High Commissioner, Abuja, Nigeria. For services to British foreign policy in Africa.
- The Rt Hon. Edward Zacca – President of the Court of Appeal of the Turks and Caicos Islands and formerly of Bermuda and the Cayman Islands. For services to justice in the Overseas Territories and to the Privy Council.

==== Companion of the Order of Saint Michael and Saint George (CMG) ====
- Peter Batey OBE – Chairman of Great Britain-China Centre. For services to UK relations with China.
- Thomas Drew – Formerly Principal Private Secretary to the Foreign Secretary, Foreign and Commonwealth Office. For services to British foreign policy interests.
- Paul Griffiths – Executive Officer, Dubai Airports, and Vice-President, Royal College of Organists. For services to British prosperity in the United Arab Emirates and to music.
- Rudolph Markham – non-executive director, Foreign and Commonwealth Office. For services to the Foreign and Commonwealth Office Management Board.
- Jill Morris – Director Europe, Foreign and Commonwealth Office. For services to British foreign policy.
- Dr. Francis Rangarajan – Director Europe, Foreign and Commonwealth Office. For services to British multilateral diplomacy.
- Simon Smith – H.M. Ambassador, Kyiv, Ukraine. For services to British foreign policy interests in Ukraine.
- Mark Cameron Angus Thomson OBE – Secretary-General, Association for the Prevention of Torture. For services to global torture prevention.
- Peter West – High Commissioner, Freetown, Sierra Leone. For services to British foreign policy in Africa.
- Elizabeth Anne Wright, academic, School of Oriental and African Studies, London University, Nottingham University and other Institutions. For services to the understanding of China.

=== The Royal Victorian Order ===
==== Knight Commander of the Royal Victorian Order (KCVO) ====
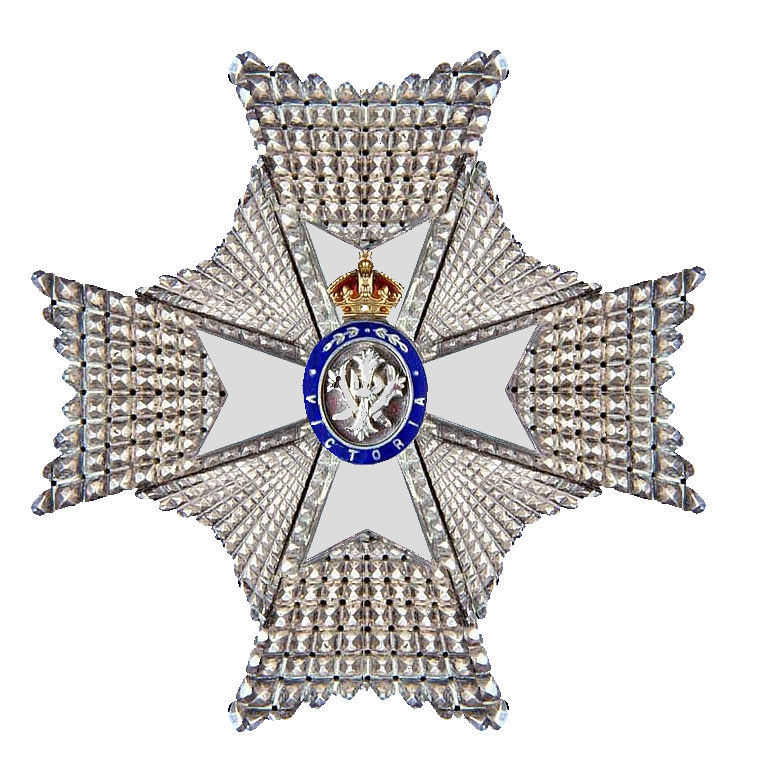
Insignia of a Knight / Dames Commander of the Royal Victorian Order

- Simon Hugh Patrick Boyle, Lord-Lieutenant of Gwent.
- (Archibald) Hugh Duberly, CBE, Lord-Lieutenant of Cambridgeshire.

==== Commander of the Royal Victorian Order (CVO) ====
- Charles Henry Barnett, formerly Chief Executive, Ascot Racecourse.
- Ewen John Brodie of Lethen, Lord-Lieutenant of Nairnshire.
- Sir Charles Dunstone, Kt, Chairman, The Prince's Trust.
- The Hon. Robin William Lewis, OBE, Lord-Lieutenant of Dyfed.
- The Hon. Hilary Mary Weston, CM. For services to the College of St. George.
- Edward Young, LVO, Deputy Private Secretary to The Queen.

==== Lieutenant of the Royal Victorian Order (LVO) ====
- Dr. David Michael Dixon OBE – Medical Adviser to The Prince of Wales and The Duchess of Cornwall.
- Stephen Lee Howard – Chief Executive, Business in the Community.
- Mark James Lane MVO – Gardens Manager, London Palaces, Royal Household.
- David John Read MVO – Deputy Superintendent, Palace of Holyroodhouse, Royal Household.
- The Rev. Canon Jonathan Riviere – Domestic Chaplain at Sandringham.
- Peter Bernard Smith – Director of Information Systems and Telecommunications, Royal Household.
- Tracy Watkins MVO – Secretary to the Lord Chamberlain, Royal Household.

==== Member of the Royal Victorian Order (MVO) ====
- Lieutenant-Colonel David William Nicholas Bevan, Equerry to The Prince of Wales and The Duchess of Cornwall.
- Linda Bissett, Assistant Clerk to the Lieutenancy of Fife.
- Carolyn Bloch, Formerly Deputy Chair, Pacific Leaders Forum Board, The Duke of Edinburgh's Commonwealth Study Conferences.
- Joanne Butcher, Visitor Services Manager, Palace of Holyroodhouse.
- Mohammed Choudhry. For services to the Royal Household.
- Professor William Coaldrake. For services to the Royal Collection.
- Thea Coley, formerly Assistant Private Secretary to The Duke of Cambridge.
- Gary Coutts RVM, Head Stalker, Balmoral Estate.
- Lieutenant-Colonel Raymond Giles, Military Knight of Windsor.
- Elizabeth Guest, Communications Team Office Manager, Household to The Prince of Wales and The Duchess of Cornwall.
- Craig Lennard Kowalik, formerly Assistant Private Secretary (Commonwealth) to The Prince of Wales and The Duchess of Cornwall.
- Frances Matthews, Private Secretary to the Lord-Lieutenant of West Glamorgan.
- Major Richard John Moore, Military Knight of Windsor.
- Christopher Raymond Murray, Business Development and Counters Manager, Windsor Farm Shop.
- David John Oates RVM, Coachman and State Harness Cleaner, Royal Mews, Buckingham Palace.
- Michael Paul James O'Neill, Consultant Podiatrist. For services to the Royal Household.
- Inspector Gordon Henry Owen, Metropolitan Police. For services to Royalty Protection.
- Inspector Sandra Teresa Perry, Metropolitan Police. For services to Royalty Protection.
- Karen Elizabeth Rhodes, Senior Access Control Officer, Royal Household.
- Christopher Sandamas, Chief Clerk, Private Secretary's Office, Royal Household.
- John Sawle, Deputy Clerk to the Lieutenancy of Cornwall.
- Lei Song, Merchandiser, Royal Collection Trust.
- John Peter Dimitri Wienand, Partner, Farrer & Co.
- Sheila Ann Wileman, Secretary to the Lord-Lieutenant of Bristol.

=== The Most Excellent Order of the British Empire ===
==== Knight / Dame Commander of the Order of the British Empire (KBE / DBE) ====
Order of the British Empire (Military division) ribbon

Civil

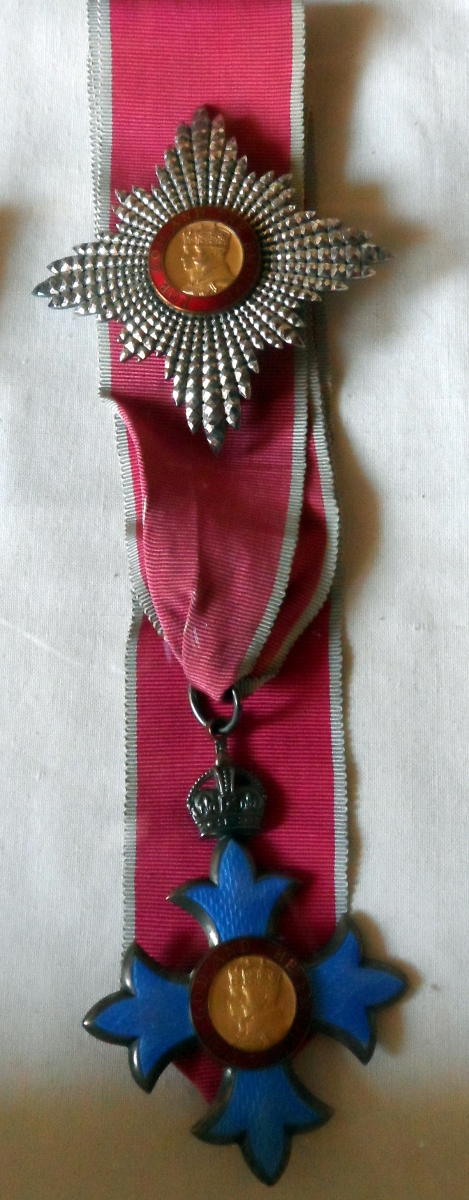
Insignia of a Knight Commander of the Order of the British Empire

- Prof. Frances Ashcroft FRS – Professor of Physiology, University of Oxford. For services to Medical Science and the Public Understanding of Science.
- Prof. Vicki Bruce, OBE FBA FRSE – Vice-President for Public Engagement, British Academy and Professor of Psychology, Newcastle University. For services to Higher Education and Psychology
- Frances Cairncross CBE FRSE – Lately Rector, Exeter College, University of Oxford. For services to Higher Education and to Economics.
- Prof. Lesley Anne Glover CBE FRSE – Lately Chief Scientific Adviser to the President of the European Commission. For services to Science.
- Zarine Kharas – Founder and Chief Executive, JustGiving.com. For services to Business and Charity.
- Dr. Nemat Shafik – Lately Deputy managing director, International Monetary Fund. For services to Public Administration and the Global Economy

==== Commander of the Order of the British Empire (CBE) ====
Military

- Gp Cpt Paul William Atkinson – Royal Air Force, 5203715S.
- Brig Timothy Bevis – Royal Marines, N028921J.
- Cdre Jeremy Blunden LVO – Royal Navy, C029832S.
- Col Robert Caldwell – Late Royal Regiment of Artillery, 511826.
- Col Jonathan Clasper – Late Royal Army Medical Corps, 518394.
- Air Cdre Neil Connell OBE – Royal Air Force, 5203656X.
- Brig Gary Deakin OBE – Late The Duke of Lancaster's Regiment, 520624.
- Col Peter Francis Mahoney OBE TD QHS – Late Royal Army Medical Corps, 518279.
- Air Cdre Gerard Mayhew – Royal Air Force, 8300155D.

Civil

- Order of the British Empire (Civil division) ribbon
  Robert Gribben Adair, Chief Executive, Belfast Harbour Commissioners. For services to the UK Ports Industry and voluntary service to Business in Northern Ireland.
- Dr. James Noel Adams, FBA, Emeritus Fellow, All Souls College, University of Oxford. For services to Latin Scholarship.
- Alexander Beveridge Anderson, OBE DL FREng, Chair, Tees Valley Local Enterprise Partnership. For services to the Tees Valley Region.
- Professor Jane Anderson, Consultant Physician and Director, Centre for the Study of Sexual Health and HIV, Homerton Hospital. For services to HIV Medicine and Sexual Health Research.
- Clarissa Mary Baldwin, OBE, Lately Chief Executive, Dogs Trust. For services to Animal Welfare.
- Dr. Maria Jane Balshaw, Director, Whitworth Art Gallery and Manchester Art Gallery. For services to the Arts.
- Jonathan Roy Blair, Documentary Filmmaker. For services to Film.
- Thomas Michael Bond, OBE, Author. For services to Children's Literature.
- Dr. John Richard Bradley, Consultant Physician and Nephrologist, Cambridge University Hospitals NHS Foundation Trust. For services to Health Research.
- Roderick Hilary "Rory" Brooks, Philanthropist. For charitable services through the Rory and Elizabeth Brooks Foundation and to the Brooks World Poverty Institute at the University of Manchester.
- Donal Brown, Lately Director, UK Joint Ebola Taskforce. For services to International Development.
- Robin Francis Budenberg, Lately Chairman, UK Financial Investments. For services to Taxpayers and the Economy.
- David Neill Bull, Chief Executive, UNICEF UK. For humanitarian services.
- Carol Burke, FREng, Managing Director, Unipart Manufacturing Group. For services to Engineering.
- Professor Graham Douglas Caie. For services to Education and Research in Britain and Europe and to Native Languages.
- Dr. John Charles Cater, Vice-Chancellor, Edge Hill University. For services to Higher Education and Teacher Training.
- Jonathan Church, Artistic Director, Chichester Festival Theatre. For services to the Theatre.
- Greg Clark. For services to Economic Development.
- John Connaghan, Director for Health Workforce and Performance, Scottish Government. For services to NHS Scotland.
- Professor Julian Moray Crampton, DL, Vice-Chancellor, University of Brighton. For services to Higher Education.
- Benedict Timothy Carlton Cumberbatch, Actor. For services to the Performing Arts and to Charity.
- Nicola Whitmont Dandridge, Chief Executive, Universities UK. For services to Higher Education.
- Priscilla Elizabeth Davies, OBE. For voluntary services to the community in South Wales.
- Teresa Ogilvy Dent, Chief Executive, Game and Wildlife Conservation Trust. For services to Wildlife Conservation.
- Chiwetel Ejiofor, OBE, Actor. For services to Drama.
- Jane Elizabeth Everton, Deputy Director, Planning (Development Plans), Department for Communities and Local Government. For services to Planning.
- Alan Finch, Executive Director, Chichester Festival Theatre. For services to the Theatre.
- Geoffrey Howard French, Chairman, Scott Wilson and President, Institution of Civil Engineers. For services to Civil Engineering.
- Professor Angela Mary Cecilia Gallop, Co-founder and Chief Executive, Axiom International|Axiom International Ltd. For services to Forensic Science.
- Michael John Stanley Gibbons, OBE, Chair, Regulatory Policy Committee. For services to Regulatory Reform.
- Professor Christopher Aidan Gilligan, Head of Epidemiology and Modelling Group, University of Cambridge. For services to Plant Health in the field of Epidemiology.
- Cllr Peter Golds, OBE, Councillor, London Borough of Tower Hamlets. For services to Local Government.
- Stephen Goldstein, DL, Chairman and Chief Executive Officer, Alexander Stevens 1995 Ltd. For services to Business and the community in the West Midlands.
- Norman Griffith Goodwin, Chief Executive, Adoption Matters Northwest. For services to Social Work and Adoption.
- Professor Rachel Griffith, FBA, Professor of Economics, University of Manchester. For services to Economic Policy.
- Dr. Loyd Grossman, OBE. For services to Heritage.
- Professor Elizabeth Anne Howlett Hall, Professor of Analytical Biotechnology, University of Cambridge and Chair, Disability Snowsports UK. For services to Higher Education and to Sport.
- Simon Halsey, Choral Conductor. For services to Music.
- His Hon. Iain McCormick Hamilton, Lately Senior Circuit Judge and Designated Family Judge for Manchester. For services to Family Justice.
- Barbara Shirley Hann, Lately Chief Executive, ACE Credit Union Services. For services to the Financially Excluded.
- Christopher Harrison, JP, Deputy Director, Specialist Delivery Criminal Investigation, HM Revenue and Customs. For services to Revenue Protection and voluntary service to Justice.
- Professor David Arnold Hill, Chairman, Environment Bank and Deputy chairman, Natural England. For services to Nature Conservation and the Economy.
- Janet Anne Hill, Director, Diversity and Inclusion, Department for Work and Pensions. For services to Diversity and Inclusion.
- Jonathan Andrew Hill, Investigator, Independent Commission for the Location of Victims' Remains. For services to the Northern Ireland Peace Process.
- Stephen Edward John Hoddell, Lately Chair, Samaritans UK and Ireland. For services to Civil Society.
- Christopher Charles Maxim Hole, Chairman and Chief Executive Officer, Universal Music Group International. For services to the Music Industry.
- Professor Anthony John Holland, Professor of the Psychiatry of Learning Disabilities, University of Cambridge. For services to Psychiatry.
- Peter John Gibson Horrocks, Lately Director, BBC World Service Group. For services to Broadcasting.
- Jeremy Hughes, Chief Executive, The Alzheimer's Society. For services to Older People.
- Elaine Inglesby-Burke, Executive Nurse Director and Deputy Chief Executive, Salford Royal NHS Foundation Trust. For services to Nursing.
- Jeremy Michael Isaacs, Chair, Remuneration Committee, Imperial College Healthcare NHS Trust. For services to the NHS.
- Professor James Anthony Jackson, FRS, Professor of Active Tectonics, University of Cambridge. For services to Environmental Science.
- Richard Matthew Jeavons, Chief Executive, Independent Reconfiguration panel and Director of Commissioning, Specialised Services, NHS England. For services to the NHS.
- Dr. David Bernard Kennedy, Lately Chief Executive, Committee on Climate Change. For services to the Environment.
- Jonathan Kent, Opera and Musical Director. For services to Music and Theatre.
- Melanie Jane Leech, Lately Director-General, Food and Drink Federation. For services to the Food and Drink Industry.
- Nusrat Mehboob Lilani, OBE, Founder and Chair, Women of the Future. For services to Women in Business.
- Dr. Ann Geraldine Limb, OBE DL. For political service.
- Helen Margaret Mahy. For services to Business and voluntary service, particularly to the Legal Profession and Diversity in the Workplace.
- John Kenneth Mason, Head of Directorate for Economic Development, Scottish Government. For public service to Business and Major Events.
- John Alexander Matheson, Director of Health Finance, e-Health and Analytics, Scottish Government. For services to Healthcare.
- Clare Elizabeth Matterson, Director of Strategy, Wellcome Trust. For services to Public Engagement with Science.
- Dr. Heather McGregor. For services to Business, especially Employment Skills and Diversity in the Workplace.
- Nicola, Lady Mendelsohn, Co-Chair, Creative Industries Council and Vice-President, Europe, Middle East and Africa, Facebook. For services to Creative Industries.
- Theresa Middleton, Director, Business Customer and Strategy, London, HM Revenue and Customs. For services to Small Businesses.
- Andrew Harold Mitchell, Lately Programme Director, Crossrail. For services to Civil Engineering.
- Dr. Chaand Nagpaul, Chair, General Practitioners Committee, British Medical Association. For services to Primary Care.
- Amanda Nevill, Chief Executive, British Film Institute. For services to the Film Industry.
- Elizabeth Mary Nicholl, OBE, Chief Executive, UK Sport. For services to Sport.
- Professor Jonathan Paul Nicholl, Dean, School for Health and Related Research, University of Sheffield. For services to Health Research.
- Carole Ann Oatway, Chief Executive, Criminal Injuries Compensation Authority. For services to Victims of Crime.
- Diana Owen, Chief Executive and Trustee, LEAD Academy Trust. For services to Education.
- Lynne Gillian Owens, QPM, Chief Constable, Surrey Police. For services to Policing and Criminal Justice.
- Hamid Patel, Chief Executive, Tauheedul Education. For services to Education.
- Charles William Plant, Chair, Solicitors Regulation Authority Board. For services to Legal Education and Regulation.
- Alexander Moinet Poots, Chief Executive Officer and Artistic Director, Manchester International Festival. For services to the Arts.
- Christina Ann Potter, Principal, Dundee and Angus College. For services to Education.
- Richard Alan Pym, Chairman, UK Asset Resolution. For services to Taxpayers and Financial Stability.
- Christina Henking Muller Rees. For services to the Church of England.
- Dr. Andrew John McGlashan Richards, Chairman, Ixico, Abcodia, Congenica, Novacta. For services to Investment in the Life Sciences Industry.
- Edward Charles Richards, Lately Chief Executive, Office of Communications. For services to the Media, Telecomms and Communications Markets.
- Peter Roberts, Principal, Leeds City College. For services to Further Education.
- Jaee Kamalnath Samant, Director, Labour Market Policy, Department for Business, Innovation and Skills. For services to the Reform of Social Policy.
- Judge Derek Searby, TD, Lately District Tribunal Judge. For services to the Administration of Justice and the Tribunals Judiciary.
- Malcolm Shepherd, Chief Executive Officer, Sustrans. For services to Transport and the Environment.
- Neil Roger Sherlock. For public and political service.
- Dr. Hari Prasad Mohan Lal Shukla, OBE. For services to Interfaith and to the community in Tyne and Wear.
- Louise Isabelle Silverton. For services to Midwifery and Maternal and Child Health.
- Cllr. David Simmonds, Deputy Leader, London Borough of Hillingdon and Executive Member, Local Government Association. For services to Children, Families and Local Government.
- Dominic Crispin Adam Simon, Lately Managing Director, Trade Group, UK Trade and Investment. For services to the Development of Trade for UK Exporters.
- Nathaniel Lester Sloane. For services to Venture Philanthropy and Social Investment.
- Gillian Mary Slocombe, Chief Guide. For services to Girls and Young Women.
- Anthony David Steen, Chairman, the Human Trafficking Foundation. For services to Fighting Modern Day Slavery
- Carole Stone. For services to Market Research and to charity.
- Yvonne Anne Strachan, OBE, Head of Equality, Human Rights and Third Sector, Scottish Government. For services to Equality.
- Andrew John Street, Managing Director, John Lewis plc. For services to Economic Growth and Chair, Greater Birmingham and Solihull Local Enterprise Partnership.
- Francesca Sulke, Executive Director, Children and Young People, Lewisham, London. For services to Education.
- Peter John Charles Troughton, Pro-Chancellor and lately Chair of Council, University of Bath. For services to Business, Education and Culture.
- Mark-Anthony Turnage, Composer. For services to Music.
- Edmund Arthur Wallis. For services to Business and Charity.
- Sara Vivienne Weller. For public service.
- Nigel Gordon Whitehead, FREng, Group Managing Director Programmes and Support, BAE Systems and Commissioner, UKCES. For services to Vocational Education and Skills.
- Jonathan Peter Wilkinson, OBE. For services to Rugby Union.
- Dr. Lena Cooper Wilson, Chief Executive, Scottish Enterprise. For services to Economic Development in Scotland.

==== Officer of the Order of the British Empire (OBE) ====
Military

Royal Navy

- Commander (now Captain), Royal Navy John Paul BOWERS
- Captain, Royal Navy Andrew Paul BURNS
- Commander, Royal Navy Angus Nigel Patrick ESSENHIGH
- Captain, Royal Navy Trevor James GULLEY

British Army

- Lieutenant Colonel Jonathan David BILLINGS, MBE, Royal Tank Regiment
- Lieutenant Colonel Matthew Willard Louis BOTSFORD, MBE, 1st The Queen’s Dragoon Guards
- Lieutenant Colonel Benjamin James FITCH, Royal Corps of Signals
- Lieutenant Colonel Alistair Stuart Kirman FOX, MBE, Corps of Royal Engineers
- Colonel Dominic Paul FOX, MBE, late Royal Regiment of Artillery
- Lieutenant Colonel Arwyn LEWIS, Corps of Royal Electrical and Mechanical Engineers
- Lieutenant Colonel Mark Andrew POMROY, Adjutant General’s Corps (Staff and Personnel Support Branch)
- Lieutenant Colonel Peter Thomas QUAITE, Corps of Royal Engineers
- Lieutenant Colonel Adrian Peter REILLY, The Royal Regiment of Scotland
- Acting Colonel Andrew Stanley TAYLOR, Army Cadet Force
- Lieutenant Colonel Simon Rupert WEST, Royal Regiment of Artillery

Royal Air Force

- Wing Commander Stephen Robert CHAPMAN
- Wing Commander Jonathan Blythe CRAWFORD
- Group Captain Tamara Nancy JENNINGS
- Wing Commander Mark David LEEMING
- Wing Commander Ian Morton ROBINSON
- Wing Commander Davendra Murray SHARMA

Royal Air Force Volunteer Reserve (Training)

- Wing Commander Paul Ernest Leonard BOWER

Civil

- Professor Kenneth Addley, Director of Occupational Health Service, Northern Ireland Civil Service. For services to Occupational Health.
- Mark Isaac Adlestone. For services to Business and Charity in the North of England.
- David Ahern, chief executive officer, Shannon Trust. For services to Prisoners and the community.
- Dr Sidney Christopher Alford, Founder and chairman, Alford Technologies Ltd. For services to Explosive Ordnance Disposal Technology.
- Ms Sharon Jane Allen, chief executive officer, Skills for Care. For services to Social Care, Homeless People and Housing.
- James Anderson, Cricketer. For services to Cricket.
- Brigadier John Anthony Anderson, Chairman, The Gurkha Brigade Association. For services to the Gurkha Regiments.
- Bishop Anba Angaelos, General Bishop of the Coptic Orthodox Church in the UK. For services to International Religious Freedom.
- Ms Karen Andersen Armstrong, Author. For services to Literature and Interfaith Dialogue.
- Mark Edward Astarita, Director of Fundraising, British Red Cross. For services to Emergency First Aid and Fundraising.
- Dr Janet Atherton, President, Association of Directors of Public Health. For services to Public Health.
- Ms Elaine Atkinson, Leader, Borough of Poole. For services to Local Government.
- Ms Mary Ann Georgina Auckland, Head of Campaigns and Marketing, External Communications, Department for Communities and Local Government. For public service, particularly to Fire Safety.
- Andrew David Bacon, Lately Chair, Leicester and Leicestershire Local Enterprise Partnership and Lately Director, British Gas/Centrica. For services to Business and the Economy.
- Ms Sarah Louise Bailey, Executive Headteacher, Queensbridge Primary School, De Beauvoir School and Mapledene Children's Centre, Hackney. For services to Education.
- Mrs Judy Susan Baker. For services to the Development of Cyber Skills.
- Mark Phillip Baldwin, Artistic Director, Rambert Dance Company. For services to Dance.
- Mr Michael Ball, Actor and Singer. For services to Musical Theatre.
- Mrs Christine Banim, National Service Director, Children and Family Court Advisory and Support Service. For services to Children.
- Mrs Gillian Elizabeth Baranski, Chief Executive, CAFCASS Cymru. For services to Vulnerable Children in Wales.
- Mrs Donna Barratt, Headteacher, Glebe Primary School, Harrow. For services to Education.
- John Raymond Barron, Chief Executive, Birmingham Royal Ballet. For services to Arts Administration.
- Simon John Bartley. For voluntary and charitable services.
- Mrs Judith Batchelar, Brand Director, Sainsbury's. For services to Farming and the Food Industry.
- Professor John Arnott Beath FRSE, Emeritus Professor of Economics, University of St. Andrews. For services to Economics.
- Michael Blackburn, North West Regional Director, BT. For services to the Economy in the North West.
- Harris Bokhari. For services to Young People and Interfaith Relations.
- Patti Boulaye. For charitable services in the UK and Sub-Saharan Africa.
- Jack Byron Boyer, Chairman, Ilika Technologies plc. For services to Science and Engineering.
- Lady Tessa Suzanne Mary Brewer, Lately Chair, City of London Festival. For voluntary service to Arts and Culture in London.
- Edward William Broadley, Lately Senior Education Officer, Education Scotland. For services to Education.
- Duwayne Lloyd Anthony Brooks. For public and political service.
- Keith Clark Brown. For services to charitable fundraising and the community in Essex.
- Professor Christopher John Budd, Professor in Applied Mathematics, University of Bath. For services to Science and Mathematics Education.
- Ms Elizabeth Bull, Lately Headteacher, Slated Row School, Milton Keynes. For services to Education.
- David Patrick Henry Burgess MBE DL. For services to Young People and the Community in West Sussex.
- Mrs Sandra Jayne Burke, Lately Chief Executive, Dundee and Angus Chamber of Commerce. For services to Economic Development and Social Care in Scotland.
- Mrs Karen Elizabeth Butler, Headteacher, Alloway Primary School, South Ayrshire. For services to Education.
- Bill William Foster Caldwell, Honorary Treasurer, Bryson Charitable Group. For services to the community in Northern Ireland.
- Ms Carolyn Margaret Mcintyre Campbell, Lately Head of International, Quality Assurance Agency. For services to Higher Education.
- Nicholas Andrew Argyll Campbell, Patron, British Association for Adoption and Fostering. For services to Children.
- Ms Patrice Canavan, Headteacher, Oaklands School, Tower Hamlets, London. For services to Education.
- Dr Janet Carr, Honorary Senior Researcher, The Tizard Centre, University of Kent. For services to People with Down's Syndrome and their Families.
- Joffre Carroll, Chief Executive, Boys' and Girls' Clubs of Wales. For services to Young People in Wales.
- Alexander Martin Clunes. For services to Drama, charity and to the community in Dorset.
- Dominic Cole, Lately Chair, The Garden History Society. For services to Landscape Conservation.
- Mrs Cheryl Anne Coppell, Chief Executive, London Borough of Havering. For services to Local Government.
- James Michael Corbett, District Operations Manager, Department for Work and Pensions. For services to Unemployed People in Waltham Forest especially through the Youth Hub.
- Mrs Lauren Costello, Executive Headteacher, The Federation of Moredon Primary and Nursery School and Rodbourne Cheney Primary School, Swindon. For services to Education.
- Ms Caroline Criado-Perez, Journalist. For services to Equality and Diversity, particularly in the Media.
- Professor Judith Helen Cross, Chair, Childhood Epilepsy and Deputy Head, Developmental Neurosciences Programme, UCL Institute of Child Health. For services to Children with Epilepsy.
- Mrs Irene Curtis, Chief Superintendent, Lancashire Constabulary and National President, Police Superintendents' Association of England and Wales. For services to Policing.
- Ms Gillian Mary Darley, Historian and Architectural Campaigner. For services to the Built Environment and its Conservation.
- Mr Ian Marshall Darling. For voluntary service to the Conservation of Wild Birds and Land Management in Scotland.
- Mr Paul Antony Darling, QC, Chair, Sports Ground Safety Authority. For services to Safety at Sports Grounds and to Horseracing.
- Mrs Katharine Davidson. For services to Government Efficiency.
- Brian Rhys Davies, Lately Chef de Mission, Team Wales, 2014 Commonwealth Games. For services to Sport in Wales.
- Jonathan Davies MBE, President, Velindre Cancer Centre, Cardiff. For voluntary and charitable services to People with Cancer.
- Ms Lesley Jean Davies, Council Member and Education Trustee, NACRO. For services to Education.
- Mr Peter Dawson, Chief Executive, The R&A and Secretary, The Royal and Ancient Golf Club of St Andrews. For services to Sport.
- The Reverend Canon Cynthia Dowdle, Dean of Women's Ministry, Diocese of Liverpool. For services to Gender Equality and Social Inclusion.
- Paul Michael Stewart Doyle, Deputy Director, HM Treasury. For services to Economic Analysis and Policy-making.
- Professor Trevor Werner Drew, Lead Scientist, Viral Diseases, Animal and Plant Health Agency. For services to Animal Health and Welfare.
- John Laing Duncan, Consultant General and Vascular Surgeon, Raigmore Hospital, Inverness. For services to Healthcare in the North of Scotland.
- Ms Deborah Egan, Director, Connect the Dots, director, Welcome to Yorkshire and board member, Sheffield Local Enterprise Partnership. For services to the Creative and Digital Industry.
- Mrs Natalie Cecilia Elphicke, Chair, Million Homes, Million Lives. For services to Housing.
- William Alan Evans. For services to Education.
- Professor Jane Cecelia Falkingham, Dean, Faculty of Social and Human Sciences, Southampton University and director, ESRC Centre for Population Change. For services to Social Science.
- John Dominic Mortimer Fisher, Chairman and Vice-President, The Officers Association. For services to Armed Forces Personnel.
- Ms Kathryn Forsyth, Director of Education, Service Children's Education, Ministry of Defence. For services to Armed Forces Families.
- Mrs Candida Gertler, Co-founder, Outset Contemporary Art Fund. For services to Contemporary Visual Arts and Arts Philanthropy.
- Alan Stewart Gilfillan, Assistant Chief Executive, Scottish Parliament. For public and parliamentary services in Scotland.
- James Graham Simpson Gill, Lately Forest Management Director, North England Forest District, Forestry Commission England. For services to British Forestry.
- Mrs Philippa Jane Glanville. For services to the Decorative Arts and Arts Heritage.
- Dr Elizabeth Goodwin, chief executive officer, Waste and Resources Action Programme. For services to Business Resource Efficiency and the Environment.
- Mrs Edwina Constance Grant, Chair, Local Safeguarding Children's Board, Solihull Council. For services to Safeguarding Children and Young People.
- Ms Sharon Lesley Gray, Headteacher, Netherfield Primary School, Nottingham. For services to Education.
- Andrew Stephen Griffiths, Lately Headteacher, Ellowes Hall Sports College, Dudley, West Midlands. For services to Education.
- James Christopher Gurling, Member, Executive Committee, Liberal Democrats. For political service.
- Dr Nicholas John Harding, Chair, Sandwell and West Birmingham Clinical Commissioning Group. For services to Primary Care.
- Dr Keith Harris. For services to the Music Industry.
- Nicholas John Hartley. For services to Young People.
- Mark James Hartley-King, Corporate Security, Home Office. For services to the Professional Standards Unit and the Royal Air Force Volunteer Reserve.
- Ms Antoinette Harvey, Senior Geoscientist, Oil and Gas Authority. For services to Energy Development.
- Peter Terence Harwood, Lately Chief Conciliator, Advisory, Conciliation and Arbitration Service. For services to the Economy and Employment Relations.
- Jack Hatch, Headteacher, St Bede C of E Primary Academy, Bolton. For services to Education.
- Mrs Jennifer Hawthorne, Head of Community Cohesion, Northern Ireland Housing Executive. For services to Housing.
- Ms Linda Beatrice Haye, DL JP. For services to Education, Criminal Justice and charity in Hertfordshire.
- Ernest Hecht, managing director, Souvenir Press Ltd. For services to Publishing and to charity.
- James Anthony Hempsall, National Support Director, Achieving Two Year Olds (A2YO). For services to Childcare.
- John Hamilton Henderson, Executive Headteacher, White Woods Multi Academy Trust, Rotherham. For services to Education.
- Dr Mary Hepburn, Consultant Obstetrician and Gynaecologist. For services to Glasgow Women's Reproductive Health Service.
- Reverend Robert Herron, Lately Chair, Interim Western Education and Library Board. For services to Education.
- Barry Langford High. For services to charity and to the community in Blockley, Gloucestershire.
- Ms Julia Hobsbawm, Founder, Editorial Intelligence. For services to Business.
- Ms Helen Jane Hobson, Senior Social Development Adviser, Department for International Development. For services to Women in Developing Countries Combating Female Genital Mutilation.
- Professor Christopher Gordon Hodge, FREng, Chief Electrical Engineer, BMT Defence Services Ltd. For services to Royal Navy Engineering.
- Andrew Hodgson, chief executive officer, SMD Ltd and Deputy Chair, North East Local Enterprise Partnership. For services to Manufacturing and the North East Economy.
- Mrs Dorothy Mary Holford, Consultant, Aircraft Structural Integrity, QinetiQ. For services to Military Aviation.
- Kevin Hollins, Lately Principal, Knutsford Academy, Cheshire. For services to Education.
- Ms Georgetta Elaine Holloway, Director, The Central Learning Partnership Trust and Headteacher, Heath Park Academy, Wolverhampton. For services to Education.
- Ms Amy Louise Holmes, Director, Better Regulation, EU and International, Defra. For services to Public Administration.
- Ms Emily Victoria Holzhausen, Director of Policy and Public Affairs, Carers UK. For services to Carers.
- Paul John Hooper, JP, Society Secretary, Royal Bath and West of England Society, Association of Show and Agricultural Organisations. For services to the Agricultural Show Industry.
- Ms Perdita Mary Hunt, DL, Director, Watts Gallery. For services to the Arts.
- Clifton John Claude Ibbett. For services to charity and to the community in Bedfordshire.
- John Robert Illingsworth, Governor, HMP Wymott. For services to HM Prison Service.
- Ms Sally Elizabeth Jaeckle, Early Years Services Manager, Bristol City Council and Senior Adviser, South West National Strategies. For services to Early Years Education.
- Ms Cathryn James, Chief Executive, Public Concern at Work. For services to Employment Rights.
- Huw Morgan Jenkins, Chair, Swansea City Football Club. For services to Sport in Wales.
- Dr David John Johnston. For services to the community and to voluntary service in the Built Heritage sector.
- Roderick Barrymore Brooke Jones. For services to the community in Bognor Regis, West Sussex.
- Anthony Kendall, Chair, London Youth Games. For services to Youth Sport.
- Mrs Gillian Dorothy Kennedy, Consultant Speech and Language Therapist for Neonates and Paediatrics. For services to Speech and Language.
- Wesley Albert Kerr, Lately Chair, London Committee, Heritage Lottery Foundation. For services to Heritage.
- William James Kerr, Assistant Chief Constable, Police Service of Northern Ireland. For services to Policing and the community in Northern Ireland.
- Colin Alexander Kinnear. For services to the Arts and Education in Worcestershire.
- Lady Elizabeth Janet Kitson. For services to the Army Families Federation and to the community in Dartmoor, Devon.
- Councillor Claire Kober, Leader, Haringey Borough Council. For services to Local Government.
- Desmond Paul Lambert, Principal, Plumpton College. For services to Land Based Education and Young People.
- Mr Frank James Lampard. For services to Football.
- Jonathan Stewart Lane, Chair, Tennis Foundation. For services to Sport and the Arts.
- Mrs Shelagh Jane Legrave, Principal and Chief Executive, Chichester College. For services to Further Education.
- Dr Marianthi Leontaridi. For public service.
- Professor Paul Anthony Lewis, Emeritus Professor of Midwifery, Bournemouth University and Chair of the Executive Trustee Board, ALSO UK. For services to Mothers, Midwives and Maternity Services.
- Mrs Eileen Teresa Lindsay, Founder, Lindsay Leg Club. For services to Nursing.
- Ms Margaret Lockwood-Croft, Chair, Marchioness Action Group. For services to River Safety.
- Mrs Susan Margaret Lomas, DL. For services to Young People through Girlguiding.
- Miss Judith Ann Lowe, Deputy Chair, Construction Industry Training Board. For services to the Construction Industry, particularly Women in Construction.
- Dr Hong Lu. For services to the Chinese community in the UK and Community Relations between the UK and China.
- Dr Clare Therese Lukehurst. For services to the Anaerobic Digestion Industry.
- Professor Anita Macdonald, Consultant Paediatric Dietitian, Birmingham Children's Hospital NHS Foundation Trust. For services to Dietetics.
- Professor Averil Mary Macdonald, Professor Emerita, University of Reading. For services to Women in Science and Public Engagement with Science.
- Ms Deirdre (Dids) Macdonald, Co-Founder and CEO, ACID (Anti Copying in Design). For services to the Design Industry.
- Professor Ronald MacDonald, Adam Smith Chair of Political Economy, University of Glasgow. For services to Economic Policy.
- Conall Gerald Maclynn, Lately President, Appeals Tribunals Northern Ireland. For services to Independent Tribunals in Northern Ireland.
- Geoffrey Keggen Maddrell. For services to Business, Industry and to charity.
- David Gareth Madge, Lately Director of Legal Services, South Wales Police. For services to Policing.
- Ms Angela Mary Main Thompson, Lately Lawyer, Solicitors' Office, HM Revenue and Customs. For services to Legal Work and Taxpayers.
- Roderick Neil Malone, Ministry of Defence. For services to Defence Acquisition.
- Thomas Mannion, Headteacher, St Aloysius College, Islington. For services to Education.
- Ms Lesley Ann Manville, Actress. For services to Drama.
- Roger Marsh, Chair, Leeds City Region Local Enterprise Partnership. For services to Business and the Economy.
- Dr Jonathan Marshall, General Practitioner, Buckinghamshire. For services to General Practice.
- Mr Timothy Fraser Marshall, Producer, Royal British Legion Festival of Remembrance. For services to Service and ex-Service Personnel.
- Nicholas Matthew, Squash Player. For services to Squash.
- Ms Fay Maxted, chief executive officer, The Survivors Trust. For services to Victims of Rape and Sexual Violence.
- Mrs Ann Lindsay Maxwell, Founder, Muir Maxwell Trust. For charitable services to the Treatment and Care of Epilepsy in Children.
- Prof Em Roy Robert Alexander McConkey. For services to people with Intellectual and Developmental Disabilities.
- Andrew McConnell. For services to Accounting and the community in Huddersfield, West Yorkshire.
- Mrs Linda Ann Cross McDonald, Founder, Malawi Underprivileged Mothers. For voluntary service to Healthcare in Malawi.
- Dr James McGilly, Ministry of Defence. For services to Defence.
- Dr Carol Susanne McGowan, Clinical Psychologist, Ministry of Defence. For services to Armed Forces Personnel.
- John Mark McLean, Chief Executive, Fold Housing Association Limited. For services to Housing and the community in Northern Ireland.
- Councillor James McMahon, Leader, Oldham Council. For services to the community in Oldham.
- Mrs Lynne Christine McNicoll, Chair, It's Good 2 Give. For services to Children's Cancer Charities in Scotland.
- Peter Joseph McPartland, Headteacher, Trinity Special School, London Borough of Barking and Dagenham. For services to Special Educational Needs.
- Mr Vincent Samuel Middleton, Chair and managing director, Newburgh Engineering Ltd. For services to Advanced Manufacturing Skills Training.
- Peter John Millican, Chief Executive and Founder, Kings Place. For services to the Arts.
- Ms Helen Louise Milner, Chief Executive, Tinder Foundation. For services to Digital Inclusion.
- Steven William Moffat, Television Writer. For services to Drama.
- Richard Ian Morgan, Deputy chairman, Wellglade Group. For services to Public Transport and the community in the East Midlands.
- Ms Roslyn Louise Morpeth, Chief Executive, National Extension College. For services to Further Education.
- Mrs Emer Marie Murnaghan, Head of Business Improvement, Graham Construction. For services to the Civil Engineering Profession and Further Education in Northern Ireland.
- James Nicholas Murray Wells. For services to Business.
- Professor Linda Ann Newson FBA, Director, Institute of Latin American Studies, University of London. For services to Latin American Studies.
- Professor Gillian May Nicholls, Deputy Vice-Chancellor, Academic Affairs, University of Surrey. For services to Higher Education.
- Professor James Robert Nixon. For services to Healthcare and to the community in Northern Ireland.
- John (Mark) Nodder, Chairman and CEO, Wrights Group. For services to the Economy in Northern Ireland.
- Dr Matthew O'Callaghan, Chairman, Melton Mowbray Pork Pie Association. For services to the Food Industry and Small Businesses in Leicestershire.
- Dr Dayo Olukoshi, Principal, Brampton Manor Academy, East Ham, London. For services to Education.
- Councillor Teresa Ann Jude O'Neill, Leader, Bexley Borough Council and vice-chair and Conservative Group Leader, London Councils. For services to the community and Local Government in London.
- Ms Louise O'Sullivan, Ministry of Defence. For services to Defence.
- Professor David Charles Parker, FBA, FSA, Edward Cadbury Professor of Theology, University of Birmingham. For services to Higher Education.
- Mrs Gillian Marie Parkin, Co-Founder and managing director, GGR Group Ltd. For services to Construction.
- Atul Pathak, managing director, Appt Corporation Ltd. For services to Entrepreneurship.
- Adrian Philip Penfold, Head of Planning, British Land and author, Penfold Review. For services to the Property Industry and public service to Planning.
- Professor John Robert Pepper, Professor of Cardiothoracic, Royal Brompton and Harefield NHS Trust, London. For services to Heart and Lung Surgery.
- Lady Sarah Anne Pigot. For services to the community in the Isle of Wight.
- Professor Susan Marguerite Piotrowski, Lately Pro Vice-Chancellor (Academic) and Emeritus Professor, Canterbury Christ Church University. For services to Higher Education.
- Mrs Helen Pitcher, Chairman, Advanced Boardroom Excellence. For services to Business.
- Miss Judith Susan Portrait. For charitable services.
- Ms Mary Teresa Rainey. For services to Advertising.
- Ms Margaret Randles, Co-founder and director, Busy Bees Group. For services to Children and Families.
- Ian Robert Readhead, QPM, Director of Information, Association of Chief Police Officers and CEO, ACRO Criminal Records Office. For services to Policing and Public Protection.
- Mr Edward John David Redmayne, Actor. For services to Drama.
- Aldham Edward Robarts, DL, Benefactor, Liverpool John Moores University. For services to Higher Education and to the City of Liverpool.
- Professor Elizabeth Jane Robb, JP, Chief Executive, Florence Nightingale Foundation. For services to Nursing and Midwifery.
- Mrs Susan Robb, National Head of Early Years, 4Children. For services to Children and Families.
- Graham John Robeson, Eastern Treasurer, Conservative Party. For voluntary political service.
- Mrs Carol Anne Rosati, Founder, Inspire and Aspire and director, Harvey Nash. For services to Women in Business.
- Dr Andrew Cameron Salvesen, DL. For services to Entrepreneurship and philanthropic service to the community in Scotland.
- John Hope Sanderson, Director, Cairnhill Structures Ltd. For services to Business and voluntary service in Lanarkshire.
- Ms Angela Mary Scrutton, Head of Drugs Legislation, Home Office. For services to Public Protection through Drugs Control.
- Nicholas John Elliot Sealy. For services to charity and to the community in Surrey.
- Mrs Elizabeth Seers, Headteacher, Heaton School, Stockport. For services to Children with Special Educational Needs and Disabilities.
- David Mark Sellens, Headteacher, Thomas Jones Primary School, Royal Borough of Kensington and Chelsea. For services to Education.
- Robert Mark Greenhill Semple, President, National Conservative Convention. For political service.
- Thomas John Sharpe. For political service.
- Patrick Michael Shepherd. For services to Business and to Charity in York.
- Dr Fiona Marion Sim, Adviser, NHS England and Chair, Royal Society for Public Health. For services to Public Health.
- Mr Alan Simpson, DL, Chair of Court, University of Stirling. For services to Education.
- Lady Elise Becket Smith. For services to Music.
- Michael Jarvis Smith, Chief Executive, Gen 2 Training Ltd. For services to Skills Training and voluntary service to the community in Cumbria.
- Richard Brian Ashley Stones. For services to Policing and the Business community, particularly in the East Midlands.
- Mrs Jayne Louise Storey, Benefits and Credits, Washington, Tyne and Wear, HM Revenue and Customs. For services to Child Benefit Recipients.
- David Charles Surplus, Director, B9 Energy Group. For services to Renewable Energy, particularly in Northern Ireland.
- William John Gallienne Swainson, Senior Commissioning Editor, Bloomsbury. For services to Literary Translation.
- Miss Angharad Andrea Thomas, Head, Drugs Licensing and Compliance Unit, Home Office. For services to the UK Pharmaceutical Industry and the Control of Drugs.
- Michael Christopher Thornton, Director, Scotland, Energy Saving Trust and Chair, Scottish Power Foundation. For services to Economic Growth and the Environment.
- Ms Kathyrn Derran Tickell. For services to Folk Music.
- Professor Brian John Tighe, Professor of Chemical Engineering, Aston University. For services to Research in Biomedical Polymers.
- James Roger Titcombe, National Adviser on Safety, Care Quality Commission. For services to Patient Safety.
- Mr Jacob Anthony Tompkins, managing director, Waterwise. For services to Water Efficiency.
- Ms Jane Vass, Head of Public Policy, Age UK. For services to Financial Services Consumers.
- Stephen John Wadey, Lately managing director, MBDA UK. For services to the UK Defence Sector.
- Mr David Glyndwr Wall, Director of Communications, Policy and Strategic Support, Department for Social Development, Northern Ireland Executive. For public service, particularly to Communities.
- Andrew Wallis, Founder and chief executive officer, Unseen. For services to the Eradication of Human Trafficking and Modern Slavery.
- Ms Lynn Wallis, Artistic Director, The Royal Academy of Dance. For services to Dance.
- Simon Philip Zbigniew Wallis, Director, The Hepworth Wakefield. For services to Art.
- Mrs Margaret Anne Walpole, Lately Headteacher, Paddock School, Wandsworth. For services to Children with Special Educational Needs and Disabilities.
- Brian Martin Walsh, Executive Director of People, Coventry City Council. For services to Social Care.
- Mrs Loraine Rosalie Warren. For charitable services to Women and Children in Israel.
- David Alexander Warrilow, Deputy Director of Science and Innovation and Head of Science, Department of Energy and Climate Change. For services to Science.
- Howard Way, Detective Inspector, Metropolitan Police Service. For services to Disaster Victim Identification.
- Paul Weiland. For services to Advertising and the Creative Industries.
- Steven Wellon, Ministry of Defence. For services to Defence.
- John Mcwilliam Welsh. For public service in Ayrshire.
- David William Courtenay Whelton, managing director, Philharmonia Orchestra. For services to Music.
- Mrs Claire Lois Whitaker, Director, Serious. For services to Jazz.
- Mr Michael Keith Williams, Lately HM Principal Inspector of Health and Safety. For services to Health and Safety in Construction.
- Mr Roger Mark Witcomb, Lately chairman, Competition Commission and Chair of Reporting Panel, Competition and Markets Authority. For services to the Competition and Consumer Regime.
- Howard Lindsay Wood, Chairman, Community of Arran Seabed Trust. For services to the Marine Environment.
- John Woodward, chief executive officer, Busy Bees Group. For services to Early Years Education.
- Mrs Victoria Mary Petra Wright, Trustee, Royal National Lifeboat Institution. For services to Maritime Safety.
- Dr Timothy David Wyatt. For services to the Advancement of Healthcare Science and the community in Northern Ireland.
- Robert Young. For services to the community in County Durham.

==== Member of the Order of the British Empire (MBE) ====
Military

Royal Navy

- Warrant Officer Class 1 (Seaman) David John DEAKIN
- Commander, Royal Navy David Leslie HEWITT
- Lieutenant Commander, Royal Navy Bethan KITCHEN
- Commander, Royal Navy Kerry Lewis MARMONT
- Warrant Officer Class 1 Marine Engineering Mechanic (Marine Engineering Submarines) Gary NICOLSON
- Warrant Officer Class 2 (now Acting Warrant Officer Class 1) (Air Engineering Technician) Mark PLUMMER
- Lieutenant Commander (now Acting Commander), Royal Navy John Matthew PUNCH
- Acting Lieutenant Commander, Royal Navy Paul Gary SIMPSON
- Lieutenant Commander, Royal Navy Robert John Geoffrey TANTAM

British Army

- Major James William ALDRIDGE, Welsh Guards
- Major Richard John Fellowes BAILLON, The Parachute Regiment, Army Reserve
- Major Mark Rufus George BEYNON, The Royal Welsh
- Acting Captain Samuel Harris CARRUTHERS, Army Cadet Force
- Warrant Officer Class 1 Graham Steven CHIGNELL, Corps of Royal Electrical and Mechanical Engineers
- Corporal Craig CLARK, Royal Corps of Signals
- Major Nicholas David Guise COWLEY, The Queen's Royal Hussars
- Lieutenant Colonel Mark Alan DAVIES, The Queen's Royal Lancers
- Staff Sergeant Aaron DURHAM, Corps of Royal Engineers
- Warrant Officer Class 2 David John ELLIOTT, Corps of Royal Engineers
- Corporal Christopher Simon ELLIS, The Royal Logistic Corps
- Chaplain to the Forces (3rd Class) Karl Frederick FREEMAN, Royal Army Chaplains' Department, Army Reserve
- Major Christopher William GIBSON, Royal Army Medical Corps
- Major Richard John HALL, The Yorkshire Regiment
- Major Christopher Clive HEARN, Army Air Corps
- Corporal David HERON, The Royal Logistic Corps
- Captain Nicholas Spencer HOMER, The Royal Logistic Corps
- Major Adrian Lawrence HUNTER, Coldstream Guards
- Captain Michael JAMES, The Royal Regiment of Scotland
- Major Sarah Louise JOHNSON, The Royal Logistic Corps
- Major Caroline Joanna LEWIN, Royal Corps of Signals
- Lieutenant Colonel Michael Duncan LEWIS, Corps of Royal Engineers
- Acting Major Alexander Munro MACK, The Royal Regiment of Scotland
- Lieutenant Colonel Peter McMILLAN, Corps of Royal Electrical and Mechanical Engineers
- Warrant Officer Class 1 Paul MEADOWS, The Princess of Wales's Royal Regiment
- Major Colin George MUNCE, The Royal Logistic Corps
- Acting Lieutenant Colonel Mark Alexander NICHOLAS, The Royal Anglian Regiment
- Lieutenant Colonel Jeffrey Edward PEARSON, Royal Army Medical Corps, Army Reserve
- Major Kevin David ROGERS, Corps of Royal Engineers
- Acting Lance Corporal Cayle Darren ROYCE, The Light Dragoons
- Warrant Officer Class 2 Gavin James RUCK, Royal Regiment of Artillery
- Major Roderick Mungo Templeton SHANNON, Scots Guards
- Captain Richard David SOMERVILLE, Corps of Royal Engineers, Army Reserve
- Lieutenant Colonel Charles Rupert Metrustry STORY, Corps of Royal Engineers
- Captain Justin Stuart TAYLOR, Corps of Royal Engineers
- Staff Sergeant Gareth Neill THOMAS, 1st The Queen's Dragoon Guards
- Warrant Officer Class 1 Michael Spencer THOMPSON, The Rifles
- Major Colin WOOD, The Parachute Regiment
- Major Casanna Jane Helen WOOTTEN, Royal Corps of Signals

Royal Air Force

- Squadron Leader Michael Jeremy Jean-Paul BURTON
- Senior Aircraftman Lee Edward Lovelace COOPER
- Corporal David DERBYSHIRE Royal Auxiliary Air Force
- Chief Technician Derek James EDWARDS
- Wing Commander Tracey Maria FARNDON
- Flight Lieutenant Gareth William John HARE
- Warrant Officer Thomas MCEWAN
- Master Aircrew Aaron Martin NEAL
- Squadron Leader Ritchie Nelson PAINE
- Warrant Officer Graeme William SPARK, RAF Police (Former Chief of Air Staff's Warrant Officer (CASWO))
- Master Aircrew Duncan Alexander TRIPP
- Squadron Leader Peter VAUGHAN

Civil

- Mrs Parkash Ahluwalia – For services to the community in Derby.
- Mrs Sally Aitchison – managing director, Cash for Kids. For services to Radio and charitable fundraising.
- Miss Rimla Akhtar – Chair, Muslim Womenﾒs Sport Foundation. For services to Equality and Diversity in Sport.
- Mr Leslie Henry Alden – For services to the community in Southwark, London.
- Mr Raymond Aldous – For services to Young People and Scouting in Bedfordshire.
- Mr Anthony Ronald Allen – For services to the community in Walsall.
- Dr Duncan Anderson – Lecturer, Ministry of Defence. For services in support of Military Operations.
- Mr Kenneth Arch – For services to the community in Shropshire particularly Bridgnorth.
- Miss Michaelina Argy – Campaigner and Member, National Advisory Council, Thalidomide Trust. For services to Thalidomide Survivors.
- Mr Paul Anthony Arnill – For services to Cambridgeshire Search and Rescue and to the community in Tilney, Norfolk.
- Mr David Godfrey Arnold – For services to Community Interfaith and Relations in Manchester.
- Ms Katharine Arnold-Forster – Head of Museums and Special Collections and director, Museum of English Rural Life, University of Reading. For services to University Museums.
- Mrs Sally Elizabeth Ash – Lately Head of Boating, Canal and River Trust. For services to British Inland Waterways.
- Dr Louis John Frederick Ashdown-Hill – Historian. For services to Historical Research and the Exhumation and Identification of Richard III.
- Mr Keith Richard Vincent Asman – Operational Head, South East Counter Terrorism Unit Scientific Services. For services to Policing.
- Mrs Carol Ann Atkinson – For services to the community in Bolton.
- Mr Bryan Robert Avery – Architect. For services to Architecture.
- Mrs Aliya Jafri Azam – For voluntary and charitable services to Community Cohesion, particularly through the Al Khoei Foundation.
- Mrs Jean Ball – For services to the community in Stanbridge, Bedfordshire.
- Mrs Margaret Ellen Ball – Area Manager Germany, CofE Soldiers', Sailors' and Airmen's Clubs. For services to Armed Forces Personnel.
- Miss Veronica Hall Ballard – For services to the community in Horley, Surrey.
- Mr John William Bamber – Tournament Committee chairman, Royal Portrush Golf Club. For services to Tourism in Northern Ireland.
- Irene Agnes Bannon – For services to Tenant and Resident Rights.
- Ms Irene Barkby – Director of Strategy and Planning, NHS Lanarkshire. For services to Healthcare.
- Mr Raymond Barker – Chairman of Governors, Honilands Primary School, Enfield and director, British Education Supplies Association. For services to Education.
- Mr Keith Barley – Founder and Head Conservator, Barley Studio. For services to Cultural Restoration and Conservation.
- Mr Hugh Barry Barr – Vice-President, Northern Ireland Ploughing Association. For services to Ploughing.
- Mr Alan Charles Bartlett – Swimming Volunteer. For services to Swimming.
- Mr Henry Gerald Antony Bates – President, Dorset Wildlife Trust. For services to Wildlife and Conservation in Dorset.
- Mrs (Elizabeth) June Baxter – Lately Vice-President, National Trust For Scotland. For services to Heritage and the community in Fife.
- Mr Keith Bayley – For services to the voluntary and community sector in Hartlepool, Durham.
- Mr Stephen John Beard – For services to the community in Lincoln.
- Alderman John Robert Beggs – Councillor, Larne Borough Council. For services to Local Government.
- Ms Patricia Ann Bell – Lately Regional Manager, Immigration and Enforcement, Home Office. For services to Border Safety.
- Mrs Sharon Bell – Broadwater Children's Centre Manager, Stevenage. For services to Children and Families.
- Mrs Alice Jane Bennett – Principal, Madresfield Early Years Centre, Worcestershire. For services to Early Years Education.
- Mr Matthew Bennett – For services to the community in Westminster, London.
- Miss Nicola Jane Charlotte Bennett-Rees – Clinical Nurse Specialist, Great Ormond Street Hospital for Children NHS Foundation Trust. For services to Nursing.
- Mrs Iris Elizabeth Benson – Expert by Experience, Mersey Care NHS Trust. For services to Mental Health.
- Mrs Susan Bentley – For services to charity and to the community in Runcorn, Cheshire.
- Councillor Judi Billing – Councillor, North Hertfordshire District Council. For services to Local Government.
- Mr Michael David Black – chief financial officer, Aepona Ltd. For services to the Northern Ireland ICT Industry.
- Mrs Susan Dorothy Black – Senior Lecturer, University of Ulster. For services to Cross-Community Relations and Education in Northern Ireland.
- Mrs Deborah Jane Bliss – Hand Knitting Designer. For services to Hand Knitting and the Craft Industry.
- Professor Michael Bochmann – For services to Music.
- Miss Lynn Edwina Boleyn – For services to the community in Wall Heath, West Midlands.
- Miss Hilary Catherine Isolda Bolitho – For services to the community in Broadway, Somerset.
- Dr Geoffrey William Bowen – For services to the Langdale Ambleside Mountain Rescue Team, Cumbria.
- Councillor Robert George Boyce – Councillor, Maldon District Council. For services to Local Government.
- Mrs Jennifer Susan Boyd – Headteacher, Rosewood Special Free School, Southampton. For services to Special Education.
- Ms Maureen Frances Boylan – University Secretary, University of London. For services to Higher Education.
- Mr Paul Joseph Bradley – Business Strategist for Detained Fast Track, Asylum Casework Directorate, Home Office. For services to Equality and Diversity.
- Miss Emma Jane Bridge – Administrative Officer, Border Force. For services to Border Security.
- Mrs Lorraine Brockhurst – Work Experience Co-ordinator, Worthing, HM Revenue and Customs. For services to Young People in the Workplace.
- Miss Margaret Brockie – For services to the community in Bolton and to Carriage Driving through the Riding For Disabled Association in North West England.
- Miss Anne Broome – Private Office Business Manager, Department for Transport. For services to Transport.
- Colonel Jeremy John Brown – Head of Operations and Security, HM Tower of London. For services to World War One Commemorations.
- Ms Philippa Ann Brown – Policy Adviser, Motor Insurance, Department for Transport. For services to Transport.
- Mr James Bullar – Head of Nautical Studies, London Nautical School. For services to Maritime Education and voluntary service to Maritime Safety.
- Ms Eileen Burbidge – Partner, Passion Capital. For services to Business.
- Mr Edward Arthur William Burnell – For voluntary and charitable services.
- Mr Ian Doyne Malcolm Burns – Lay Observer, South East Region. For services to People in Custody.
- Miss Amanda Jane Butcher – Director, RAF Cosford Airshow and Trustee/Director, Association of Sail Training Organisations. For charitable services.
- Mrs Rosemary Mantia Campbell-Stephens – Educator, consultant, Equality and Diversity Leader and Leadership Trainer. For services to Education.
- Mrs Patricia Carroll – Operations Manager, Peterlee Contact Centre, HM Revenue and Customs. For services to Taxpayers and voluntary service to Education in Hartlepool, Co. Durham.
- Ms Jacqueline Carter – Corporate Support Office, Department for International Development. For services to Public Administration.
- Mr James Anoren Chalmers – President, Football Safety Officersﾒ Association. For services to Safety at Sports Grounds.
- Mrs Elizabeth Ann Chambers – Lately District chairman, Sea Cadet Corps. For voluntary service to the Sea Cadet Corps on Teesside.
- Mrs Suzanne Chambers – Partnership Headteacher Tutor, University of Cumbria, Lancashire. For services to Education.
- Ms Sam Moi Chan – Chair, Hua Xian Chinese Society. For services to Community Cohesion.
- Ms Elizabeth Anne Chapman – Director of Library Services, London School of Economics and Political Science. For services to Higher Education and Libraries.
- Mr John Charles Chapman – Senior Executive Officer, Ministry of Defence. For services to Defence Infrastructure.
- Mr Peter Richard Chapman – For services to St Paul's Cathedral and to charity in London.
- Dr Helen Chatterjee – Senior Lecturer, Biosciences and Head of Research and Teaching, Public and Cultural Engagement, University College London. For services to Higher Education and Culture.
- Mr Zia Uddin Chaudhry – For services to Interfaith Relations in Merseyside.
- Mr Amir Aziz Cheema – For services to Young People through the Scout Movement.
- Mr Robert John Church – Angler. For services to Angling.
- Mrs Dorothy Alma Clark – For services to Education and to the community in Surrey.
- Mr Malcolm Coates – Head of ICT, Prime Minister's Office. For services to IT Modernisation in the Public Sector.
- Mrs Cecily Coburn – Foster Carer, Lincolnshire. For services to Children and Families.
- Mr Charles Coburn – Foster Carer, Lincolnshire. For services to Children and Families.
- Miss Jill Coddington – For services to Social Housing Residents and the community in Peterborough.
- Dr Laura Jane Rachel Cohen – Chief Executive, British Ceramic Confederation. For services to the Ceramics Industry.
- Clare Collins – Lately Chair of Governors, Weyfield Primary Academy, Surrey. For services to Education and School Governance.
- Mr Edward Herbert Collins Honorary Alderman Wycombe Dc; Mayor of High Wycombe – For services to the community in High Wycombe, Buckinghamshire.
- Mrs Janet Rose Collins – Chair, Millmead Childrenﾒs Centre Partnership Ltd, Kent. For services to Children and Families.
- Mr Michael John Collins – Clarinettist. For services to Music.
- Mr Michael John Collins – For services to the community in Boroughbridge, North Yorkshire.
- Mr Benjamin Colson – Lately Bus Operator, Norfolk Green. For services to the Economy and the community in Norfolk.
- Mrs Christine Conder – Community Network Volunteer. For services to Superfast Broadband in Rural Communities.
- Mrs Christine Jane Cook – Lately School Inclusion Manager, Hayes Primary School. For services to Special Educational Needs and Disabilities.
- Mrs Jean Cooper – For services to the Civil Service Retirement Fellowship.
- Mr Peter Samuel Wilfrid Hunter Cooper – For services to Broadcast Journalism in Northern Ireland.
- Mr Robert Cooper – For services to the community in Lullington, Derbyshire.
- Mr Lloyd Anthony Cowan – Lead Sprint Coach, UK Athletics. For services to Athletics.
- Mr Trevor Cox – Senior in-Country Project Manager, Afghanistan, KBR. For services in support of Military Operations.
- Ms Emma Louise Cravitz – Educational Psychologist. For services to Children and Families particularly in London.
- Dr Margaret Joan Crawford – Consultant Paediatrician, Lincolnshire. For services to Child Protection.
- Mrs Linda Helen Crawley – Chair of Governors and Proposer, Alban City School. For services to Education.
- Dr Geoffrey Raymond Crowther – Chief Medical Adviser, Police Service of Northern Ireland. For services to Policing in Northern Ireland.
- Mrs Audrey Cuthbertson Jp – Lately general manager, Motherwell and Wishaw Citizens' Advice Bureau. For services to the community.
- Mrs Rachel Claire Cutting – Principal Embryologist, Sheffield Teaching Hospitals NHS Trust. For services to Infertility Treatment.
- Mrs Victoria Da Silva – For services to the Scout Association and to the community in Lancashire.
- Mrs Pratibha Dale – Immigration Officer, Immigration Enforcement, Home Office. For services to Vulnerable People.
- Mr Samuel Henry Trevor Dale – Vice-Chair, Board of Governors, Finaghy Primary School. For services to Education in Northern Ireland.
- Mr Richard Gough Daniels – For services to the Forest of Dean and to Forestry throughout the UK.
- Dr Megan Barbara Davies – Head, Medical Research Council Centre, Cambridge. For services to Medical Research.
- Mr Stephen George Davies – Hostel Manager. For services to Rough Sleepers in Westminster.
- Ms Cathy Davis – Foster Carer, Tyneside. For services to Children and Families.
- Mrs Patricia Hazel Davis – For services to the community, particularly to the Rivertime Boat Trust in Berkshire.
- Councillor Robert Davis DL – Deputy Leader, Westminster Council. For services to Planning and Local Government.
- Mrs Dianne Dawson – For services to the community in Ashford, Kent.
- Mrs Anne Everett Deane – Centre Organiser, Struminster Newton Branch. For voluntary service to the British Red Cross.
- Ms Jenny Ann Deeks – Director, Coin Street Family and Children's Centre, Lambeth and Southwark. For services to Children and Families.
- Mr Kenneth Raymond Deeks – Founder, Byte Night and Fundraiser, Action for Children. For services to Children.
- Mrs Linda Dellow – Chief Officer, Centre4. For services to the Nunsthorpe and Bradley Park, Grimsby.
- Mr Alexander Campbell Denholm – Governor, East Riding College. For services to Further Education.
- Mr Andrew John Dennis – Brick Instructor in Prisons, Manchester College. For services to Prison Education and Skills.
- Ms Sandra Desir – Executive Assistant to Director of Business Bank, Department for Business, Innovation and Skills. For services to Public Administration.
- Ms Natasha Jade Devon – Founder, The Self-Esteem Team. For services to Young People.
- Mrs Helen Dhaliwal – Co-Founder and director, Red Hot World Buffet. For services to the Hospitality Industry.
- Mr Henry Dimbleby – Restaurateur. For services to School Food.
- Mrs Helen Mary Dimmock – Team Leader, Ageing Society, Department for Work and Pensions. For services to Older People and the community in London.
- Mr Alexis Charles Dobbin – For services to People with Disabilities through REMAP in Gloucestershire.
- Mrs Valerie Dodsworth – For services to Homeless People and to the community in Norwich.
- Mr Robin John Dollery – Lately Head of Student Services, University of Nottingham. For services to Higher Education and Student Counselling.
- Mrs Helen Dolphin – For services to People with Disabilities, particularly through Disabled Motoring UK.
- Mr Charles David Donnan – Vice Principal, Down High School. For services to Education.
- Mrs Joanna Hilary Dowling – For services to the community in Worcester.
- Mrs Heidi Ellen Duffy – For services to Road Safety.
- Mrs Lynn Mary Duffy – For services to charity through the Honeyrose Foundation in Merseyside.
- Major Patrick Michael Halliday Dunn – Chairman, Royal Marines Association Band. For services to the Royal Marines.
- Miss Barbara Edwards – Administrative Officer, Ministry of Defence. For services to Armed Forces Personnel.
- Ms Julie Patricia Elliot – Adopter, Lancashire. For services to Adoption.
- Mr Maurice James Elliot – For services to People with Disabilities through REMAP in Derbyshire.
- Mr Roger Alan Elliot – Adopter, Lancashire. For services to Adoption.
- Mr Malcolm Ellis – For services to the Building and Construction Industry and to the community and charity in West Yorkshire.
- Captain Amir Akbar Esmiley – Surveyor in Charge, Maritime and Coastguard Agency. For services to Seafarers.
- Mr Derek Esp – For services to Education and to the community in Hinton St George and Yeovil, Somerset.
- Dr Wendy Ewart – Lately Deputy chief executive officer and Chief of Strategy, Medical Research Council. For services to Medical Research.
- Captain Christopher Tarleton Feltrim Fagan Dl – For services to the Gallipoli Association.
- Mr William Charles Farnham – Volunteer Co-Ordinator, Cardiff Neighbourhood Watch. For services to Neighbourhood Watch in Cardiff.
- Mr Allan Mclaren Fegen – For services to Scouting in North East Scotland.
- Mrs Wendy Fidler – For services to Interfaith Relations in Oxford.
- Ms Nora Flanagan – Operational Manager, Royal College of Nursing. For services to Nursing.
- Dr Helen Foley – Co-founder, Guildford Adventure Play Centre. For services to Disabled Children and their Families.
- Professor Barry Forde – Chief Executive, Broadband for the Rural North. For services to Superfast Broadband in Rural Communities.
- Mr Robert Crawford Banks Forman – Honorary Secretary, Scottish Conservative and Unionist Association. For political service.
- Mrs Marjorie Fotheringham – For services to the community in Thorne, South Yorkshire.
- Dr William Alfred Frankland – For services to Allergy Research.
- Mrs Shirley Comfort Franklin – For services to the community in Driffield, East Yorkshire.
- Mr Peter Freitag – For services to the community in Darlington, County Durham.
- Mr Anthony John French Td – For services to the community in Chichester, West Sussex.
- Mr Carl Martin Froch – For services to Boxing.
- Ms Janet Matilda Faith Fyle – Professional Policy Adviser, Royal College of Midwifery. For services to Tackling Female Genital Mutilation.
- Mr Maurice John Garner – For services to the community in Cambridgeshire.
- Mr Roger Geffen – Campaigns Director, CTC, the national cycling charity. For services to Cycling.
- Mr Issan Ul-Haque Ghazni – For public and political service.
- Mr Robert Allen Fitzwilliam Gillmor – For services to Wildlife Art.
- Mrs Jean Stella Goad – District and Parish Councillor, Arun District, West Sussex. For services to Local Government.
- Mr Robert James Goddard – Foster Carer, Brighton and Hove. For services to Children and Families.
- Mrs Jennifer Helen Godson – Dental Consultant, Public Health England. For services to Dental Public Health.
- Mr Leslie George Goodchild – Senior Executive Officer, Ministry of Defence. For services in support of the Royal Air Force.
- Mr Roger Maxwell Goodyear Dl – Chairman, Scottish Traditional Boat Festival. For services to Tourism in Banffshire.
- Mr Andrew Harold Graham – chief executive officer, Graham and Brown. For services to Manufacturing and voluntary service to Young People in Lancashire.
- Mrs Patricia Anne Graham – For services to the community in Exmouth, Devon.
- Ms Gillian Margaret Green – Musician and Lately Director, Live Music Now (Wales). For services to Music, particularly for Disadvantaged People.
- Mr Trevor Green – For services to Humanitarian Aid through Operation Florian and to charity in East Sussex.
- Mrs Ann Patricia Greenop – Foster Carer, Liverpool. For services to Children and Families.
- Mr Michael Greenop – Foster Carer, Liverpool. For services to Children and Families.
- Mrs Christine Ann Gregoire – Foster Carer, Lancashire. For services to Children and Families.
- Mr Harold Christopher Gregoire – Foster Carer, Lancashire. For services to Children and Families.
- Mr Gwyn Griffiths – Founder and Principal, Autonomous Analytics. For services to Marine Science.
- Miss Jennifer Claire Griffiths – chief executive officer, Snap Fashion. For services to Digital Innovation in the Fashion Industry.
- Dr Isobel Kay Grigor – chief executive officer, Calman Trust. For services to Community and Economic Development in the Scottish Highlands.
- Mrs Julia Elizabeth Grove – Chair, Free Church Education Committee. For services to Education.
- Mrs Michaela Groves – For charitable services.
- Sally Groves – Lately Creative Director, Schott Music. For services to Music.
- Ms Janet Guest – Assistant Practitioner, University Hospital of South Manchester NHS Foundation Trust Burns Centre. For services to People who have Endured Domestic Ritual Abuse.
- Mr George Anthony Guy – For services to Scouting and Young People in Blackpool and Warwickshire.
- Mr Robert Michael Hadfield – Chair of Governors, Crampton Primary School, Walworth, London. For services to Education.
- Mr Colin William Hagan – managing director, Riverpark Training and Development. For services to Vocational Skills.
- Mr John Morley Hall Dl – Chief Executive, Essex Wildlife Trust. For services to Wildlife and the Environment.
- Mr Peter Stephen Hall – Public Sector Pensions Expert, HM Treasury. For services to Pensions Policy.
- Mrs Fiona Mary Carr Hamilton – Community Transport Organiser, East Scotland. For voluntary service to the British Red Cross Transport Service.
- Mr Benjamin Charles Petre Hancock – Founder, London Poppy Day. For voluntary service to the Royal British Legion.
- Mr Mohammed Aslam Hanif – For services to Community Relations in Teesside.
- Captain Neil Michael Hardy – Volunteer, Royal National Lifeboat Institution. For services to Maritime Safety.
- Mrs Teresa Hardy – Border Force, Home Office. For services to Border Security.
- Mrs Kathleen Rebecca Harker – Basic Skills Development Manager, Ministry of Defence. For services to Army Education.
- Mrs Alison Beryl Harris – For services to the British Horse Society and to Equestrian Sport in Yorkshire.
- Mr Sean William Harrison – Regional and Service Co-ordinator, Fire Fighters Charity. For services to the community in the Isle of Wight.
- Ms Natasha Hart – Founder and director, Newham All Star Sports Academy. For services to Sport in East London.
- Mrs Valerie Elizabeth Haugh – Lately Head, Peripatetic Support Service, Belfast Education and Library Service. For services to Education.
- Ms Vivienne Hayes – For services to Women.
- Mr Charles William Hedges – Lately Manager, Child Exploitation and Online Protection Command, National Crime Agency. For services to Law Enforcement, particularly in the Field of Missing Children.
- Miss Sian Elizabeth Henly – Higher Officer, Disability Network Co-ordinator, Diversity and Inclusion Team, HM Revenue and Customs. For services to Disability Inclusion.
- Mrs Helen Hibberd – For services to the community through the Chorlton Good Neighbours in Manchester.
- Mr Stephen Hilditch – For services to Mountain Rescue in the Peak District and to Scouting in Derbyshire.
- Mr David Alan Hill – Administrative Officer, Ministry of Defence. For services to Defence.
- Mrs Jennifer Ann Hobson – For services to Young People in Northern Ireland through the NSPCC.
- Mrs Bernadette Susan Holmes – Teacher and Modern Languages Education Advocate. For services to Education.
- Dr Judith Mary Hooper – Director of Public Health, West Yorkshire. For services to Public Health.
- Dr Adrian Dennis Hopkins – Director, Mectizan Donation Programme. For humanitarian services in Africa.
- Ms Dorothy Horne – Senior Manager, 6VT Edinburgh Youth Cafe. For services to Young People.
- Ms Maria Jean Hornsby – For services to the Liverpool community.
- Mr David Barrett Horsfall – For services to the community in Hunshelf, South Yorkshire.
- Mr Herbert Horsley – For services to Scouting.
- Miss Louise Marie Hough – Assistant Head of Service, Resonate, Liverpool's Music Hub. For services to Music Education.
- Mr James Neil House – Senior Executive Officer, Ministry of Defence. For services in Support of Service Personnel and their Families.
- Mrs Agnes Houston – Vice-Chair, European Working Group for People with Dementia. For services to People with Dementia.
- Mrs Lucy Hovvels – Councillor, Durham County Council. For public service.
- Mrs Sarah Howard – For services to the community in Haverhill.
- Mrs Helen Murray Hoyte – Historian on Norwich Shawls. For services to Textile Heritage.
- Mrs Kathleen Susan Marjorie Hughes Jp Dl – For services to the community in Lancashire.
- Mrs Philomena Hughes – Assistant Director, Mental Health and Older People Services, Northern Health and Social Care Trust. For services to Older People in Northern Ireland.
- Mr John Michael Hulse – Team Leader, Ogwen Valley Mountain Rescue. For services to Mountain Rescue in Wales, England and Northern Ireland.
- Mr Robert Gordon Humphreys – Lately Honorary Secretary, All Party Parliamentary Beer Group. For services to Alcohol Policy.
- Ms Phillipa Jean Hunt – Director, Policy and Communications, Living Streets. For services to Vulnerable Pedestrians.
- Professor Jennifer Margaret Hunter – Emeritus Professor of Anaesthesia, University of Liverpool. For services to Medicine.
- Mrs Marie Rose Hunter – Prime Minister's Office. For services to Public Administration.
- Mr Mohammed Umar Hussain – Assistant Chief Officer, South Wales Police. For services to Policing.
- Mr Ashley Stephen Hutchings – Musician and Songwriter. For services to Folk Music.
- Mr Charles De Lisle Inniss – For voluntary service to the community in Torrington and Hatherleigh, Devon.
- Mr John Isaac – Assistant Director, Border Force, Home Office. For services to Border Security.
- Mr Andrew David James Jackson – Director, Wakehurst Place, Royal Botanic Gardens, Kew. For services to Conservation.
- Mrs Hazel Valerie Jackson – Councillor, Broxbourne Borough Council. For public service.
- Miss Zoe Jackson – Founder and director, Living the Dream Performing Arts Company. For services to Young Entrepreneurs and the Performing Arts.
- Mrs Joan Mary Jackson-Callen – Social Worker, Royal Borough of Kensington and Chelsea. For services to Children and Families.
- Mrs Rita Anne Jarman – For services to Young People and Scouting in Bedfordshire.
- Mr Thomas Sydney Javan – Lately Higher Officer, HM Revenue and Customs. For services to Taxpayers.
- Mr Anthony Hugh Mostyn Jefferies – Editor, Gibbons Stamp Monthly and Stamp Catalogues. For services to Philately.
- Mrs Catherine Rae Johnson – Founder, Albert Kennedy Trust. For services to Homeless Young Lesbian, Gay, Bisexual and Transgender People.
- Mr Ian William Johnson – For services to the community in Leigh on Sea, Essex.
- Mr Keith Johnson – For services to the community and to charity in Durham.
- Mrs Joan Elisabeth Jones – Quality and Regulatory Compliance Manager, Welsh Blood Service. For services to Blood Transfusion in Wales and the UK.
- Mrs Lesley Ann Jones – Councillor and mayor, Brent Council. For services to Local Government.
- Mrs Lynn Margaret Jones – Assistant Principal, Ormiston Sir Stanley Matthews Academy, Staffordshire. For services to Education.
- Ms Susan Mary Jones – Lately Director, A-N The Artists Information Company. For services to the Arts.
- Miss Yvonne Maria Jordan – Advanced Nurse Practitioner, Royal Gwent Hospital, Newport. For services to Nursing in Wales.
- Mr James Jukes – Founder, UK Homes 4 Heroes. For services to the Homeless.
- Mrs Deborah Mary Keighley Dl – Head of Technical Capability, Sellafield Ltd. For services to the Nuclear Industry and Young People in Cumbria.
- Mrs Agnes Kennedy – Governor, Castleroe Primary School. For services to Education in Northern Ireland and charitable services.
- Mr Clifford Thomas Kennedy – Executive Director, Oasis Caring in Action. For services to the community in Belfast.
- Miss Deirdre Ann Kennedy – Parliamentary Clerk, Defra. For services to Public Administration and the community.
- Alderman William Thomas Kennedy – Councillor, Ballymoney Borough Council. For services to Local Government and Motorcycle Road Racing.
- Mr William John Kernohan – For services to the Bus Industry.
- Mrs Rebecca Claire Kervell – Volunteer, Map Action. For services to Disaster Relief and Humanitarian Aid.
- Mr Peter Kessler – Founder and Chair of Governors, Eden Primary, Muswell Hill, London. For services to Education.
- Mrs Halimah Gulzar Khaled – For services to charity and to Community Relations in Nottingham.
- Miss Jessica Susan Kidd – For services to Young People in Northern Ireland.
- Mrs Helen Joanna Mary Kilbride-Roberts – Chair, Ditchling Museum of Art and Craft, West Sussex. For services to the Arts and Crafts.
- Mr James Peter Daniel Kinsella – Cabinet Office. For public service.
- Mrs Susan Ann Kirk – Forest Pathology Technician, Forestry Commission. For services to Tree Health, Forest Research and the community in Hampshire.
- Mr Gavin Alexander Kirkpatrick – Temporary Chief Inspector, Police Service of Northern Ireland. For services to Policing and the community in Northern Ireland.
- Mr Richard Knight – For services to Rowing.
- Mrs Susan Elizabeth Knowles – Paediatric and Educational Audiologist, Kingston Hospital NHS Foundation Trust. For services to Child Health.
- Dr Lionel Kopelowitz – For services to Interfaith Relations.
- Mr Peter Laing Jp Dl – For services to Business, Philanthropy and the community in Keith, Banffshire.
- Mrs Philippa Jayne Langley – For services to the Exhumation and Identification of Richard III.
- Mr Stephen Thomas Larard – For services to the Magistracy and to charity in Hull, East Riding of Yorkshire.
- Ms Angela Jean Lawrence – Founder and Executive Director, Manchester Active Voices. For services to Tackling Gang and Youth Violence.
- Mr Bryan William Lawrence – For voluntary service to Scouting in Scarborough.
- Mr Thomas William Lawson – For services to the St Vincent de Paul Society in North East England and to the community in Tyne and Wear.
- Mrs Claire Louise Layland – Lately Special Educational Needs Teacher, Plymouth. For services to Special Educational Needs.
- Mrs Diane Camille Layzelle – Head of Student Life, Croydon College. For services to Further Education.
- Ms Patricia Le-Bruin – Lately Honours Secretary, Department for Culture, Media and Sport. For public service.
- Mr Malcolm John Leeding – For services to the community in Oxfordshire.
- Mr Liam Lehane – Ministry of Defence. For services to Defence.
- Professor Patricia Leopold – Sessional Lecturer and Advocate of Pro Bono Activities, University of Reading. For services to Higher Education.
- Mr Colin Lewis – Police Inspector, Youth Engagement Unit. For services to Young People in Merseyside.
- Ms Donna Marie Lewis – Head of Consolidation and Financial Reporting, Education Funding Agency. For services to Education.
- Mrs Jean Lesley Lewis – Chair of Governors, Ashmount Special School, Loughborough. For services to Education.
- Mrs Sandra Lindsay – Chair, Tangerine Public Relations and Project Director, The Juice Academy. For services to Business and Young People.
- Mr Trevor John Lloyd – Bookbinder. For services to the Craft of Bookbinding and Book Restoration.
- Mrs Georgina Margaret Logan – Lately President, Scottish Swimming. For services to Sport in Scotland.
- Mr Brian William Lord – Lately Prison Officer, HMP Manchester. For services to the Prison Service.
- Mr Robert Sidney Love – Local Authority Governor, Morden Mount and Other Primary Schools, Greenwich, London. For services to Education.
- Mrs Margaret Ruth Lowbridge – Executive Chair, SFEDI Group. For services to Entrepreneurs and UK Business.
- Mr Alan Francis Peter Lowe – For services to Scouting and to the community in Budleigh Salterton, Devon.
- Mrs Pauline Ruth Lucas – President, Conservative Women's Organisation. For political service.
- Mr Philip Sidney Lusby – Head of School of Horticulture, Royal Botanic Garden Edinburgh. For services to UK Plant Conservation and Botanical and Horticultural Education.
- Mrs Rosemary Lyness – Lately Executive Nurse Director, NHS Lanarkshire. For services to Nursing and Midwifery.
- Mr Derek Stewart Maccallum – East Kilbride Contact Centre, HM Revenue and Customs. For services to Public Administration and voluntary service to the community in Scotland.
- Mr Eric Maclean Macintyre – Lately Higher Education Manager, Loughborough College. For services to Higher Education.
- Mrs Catherine Elizabeth Mackinlay – For voluntary service to St John Ambulance.
- Mrs Carolyn Heather Macleod – Programme Manager, Royal Caledonian Education Trust. For services to Education in the Armed Forces.
- Mr Blair Alan Charles Macnaughton – For services to Tartan Weaving and Kilt Making in Scotland.
- Ms Rosemarie Anne Macqueen – For services to the Preservation of Heritage.
- Mr Andrew Bell Magowan – For services to Economic Development and to the community in Northern Ireland.
- Mrs Marie Mallon – Lately Director of Human Resources, Belfast Health and Social Care Trust. For services to Health and Social Care.
- Mrs Lesley Janet Sophia Malone – Lately Chartered Teacher of Physical Education, Linlithgow Academy. For services to Physical Education and Sport.
- Mrs Susan Joy Marshfield – For services to the community in Bristol and South Gloucestershire.
- Miss Rebecca Masri – For services to charity.
- Mrs Jacalyn Claire Mathers – Designated Nurse for Safeguarding Children, Bristol Clinical Commissioning Group. For services to Tackling Female Genital Mutilation in Bristol.
- Mrs Valerie Joy Maynard – Prison Volunteer, HMP Lewes. For services to Prisoners and their Families.
- Mr William Robert Mayne – Joint Chair and director, CDM Community Transport and Chair, Shopmobility Cookstown and Dungannon. For services to Rural Transport and People with Disabilities.
- Mrs Lynn Mcburney – Vice Chair of the Board of Governors, Moorfields Primary School and Governor, Dunclug College. For services to Education.
- Mr Hugh Brown Mcclung – Chairman, Stirling Tenants' Assembly. For services to the community in Stirling.
- Sister Mary Ann Mccready – For services to People with Hearing Difficulties in Manchester.
- Mrs Michelle Elizabeth Mccrindle – Chief Executive, Food Train. For services to Older People in Scotland.
- Mr Scott Mcculloch – Senior Executive Officer, Ministry of Defence. For services to Defence.
- Mrs Ann Mcdonald – Voluntary Trusts Secretary, The Mary Budding Trust. For services to Children and Young People with Special Educational Needs.
- Mr James Thomas Mckelvey – Lately managing director, TerumoBCT. For services to the Economy in Northern Ireland.
- Ms Colette Mckune – Deputy Chief Executive, City West Housing Trust. For services to the community.
- Mr William Henry Meadows – Forest District Manager, Dumfries and Borders, Forestry Commission. For services to Forestry.
- Mrs Martha Eleanor Mearns – For services to Young People in Northern Ireland.
- Mrs Lorraine Mercer – For services to the community and to charity in Haywards Heath, West Sussex.
- Mr William Alexander Miller – For services to Cricket and charity in Northern Ireland.
- Mrs Yvonne Miller – Operations Manager, HM Court and Tribunal Service, East Hampshire and Isle of Wight. For services to Children within the Family Justice System.
- Ms Barbara Patricia Millns – For services to Rowing in Tyne and Wear.
- Mrs Alice Mills – Assistant Housing Services Manager, Northern Ireland Housing Executive. For services to Housing.
- Mrs Maria Mills – Centre Manager, Oasis Community Centre, Plymouth. For services to the community in Plymouth.
- Dr John Gordon Milne – Lately Chair, General Dental Practice Committee, British Dental Association. For services to Dentistry.
- Dr Pauline Campbell Milne – Head of Clinical Workforce Development and Planning, Health Education East of England. For services to Nurse Education.
- Dr Harriet Caroline Mitchison – Consultant Physician, Sunderland Royal Hospital. For services to Medicine.
- Her Hon Judge Anne Molyneux – For services to the Administration of Justice and voluntary service to Disadvantaged People.
- Mr John James Monaghan – For services to Sport Administration in Northern Ireland.
- Mrs Lesley Moody – managing director, AES Digital Solutions Ltd. For services to Business, Education and International Trade.
- Mr Norman Brian Moore – Lately Director, Wales Council for Deaf People. For services to Deaf People in Wales.
- Mr David William Morgan – For services to Business and to Charity in the West Country.
- Mr David Wyndham Morgan Dl – For services to Agriculture and for voluntary service to the Agricultural Community in Monmouthshire.
- Mr Craig Morley – For services to Young People and to the community.
- Mrs Tegwen Evana Morris – National Director, Merched y Wawr. For services to Language and Culture in Wales and for voluntary and charitable service in Aberystwyth and Overseas.
- Ms Catriona Morrison – For services to Sport and voluntary service in Scotland.
- Mr John Connor Muir – Founder, Inverclyde Anti-Knife Group. For services to Victims of Crime and Crime Prevention.
- Mr Arif Mukadam – Administrative Officer, HM Revenue and Customs. For services to Combatting Tax Credits Error and Fraud and voluntary service to the community in Lancashire.
- Mr Alastair William Marshall Murray – Lately Security Office Operations Manager, Scottish Parliament. For parliamentary and community service in Scotland.
- Ms Wanjiru Mwaura – Senior Peace and Security Adviser, Department for International Development. For services to Conflict Prevention in Africa.
- Professor Debra Ann Myhill – Director, Centre for Research in Writing and Subject Leader for Secondary English, University of Exeter. For services to the Social Sciences.
- Mrs Lynda Helen Myles-Till – Ambassador, Action for Children. For services to Children and Young People.
- Mr Shane Nainappan – UK Asset Recovery Adviser to the UAE and GCC, International Division, Crown Prosecution Service. For services to Law and Order, particularly International Co-operation.
- Ms Rupinder Kaur Nandra – Senior International Projects and Programmes Manager, Birmingham Chamber of Commerce. For services to International Business.
- Ms Elizabeth Rosina Neat – For services to Community Cohesion.
- Miss Michelle Denise Newman – Threshold Team Manager, Plymouth. For services to Children and Families.
- Mrs Avril Rosemary Newton – Lately Headteacher, Sanday Community School. For services to Outdoor Education and to the community in Orkney.
- Ms Jennifer Lizzie Ngulube – Foster Carer for Swiss Foster Care, Leeds. For services to Children.
- Mr James Leslie Robin Nichols – For services to Disabled Water-Skiing.
- Mrs Gillian Nowland – chief executive officer, One25. For services to Vulnerable Women.
- Councillor Mrs Frances Mary Oborski – For political and public service in Kidderminster and Wyre Forest.
- Councillor Stephen Thomas O'Brien – Chairman, Watford Conservative Association. For voluntary political service.
- Dr Erinma Eke Ochu – Wellcome Trust Engagement Fellow, University of Manchester. For services to Public Engagement in Science, Engineering and Technology.
- Mr James O'Connor – Chief Executive, NOAH Enterprise, Luton. For services to Homeless People in Bedfordshire.
- Dr Nigel Timothy James O'Connor – Consultant Haematologist, Royal Shrewsbury Hospital, Shropshire. For services to Haematology.
- Mr Ian Douglas O'Donnell – Director, Real Point. For services to the Economy and the community in the West Midlands.
- Mrs Heather Ann Ogburn – Founder, HMS Heroes. For services to Education.
- Miss Gladys Bowman Ogilvy-Shepherd – For services to Animal Welfare and Veterinary Education.
- Ms Kate Joanne Orrick – Head of DFID Libya, Department for International Development. For services to Development and Humanitarian Assistance.
- Mrs Michelle Ovens – Director, Ovens & Co and National Campaign Director, Small Business Saturday. For services to Enterprise.
- Mr George Owen – Chair, Omnibus. For services to the Arts and the community in Clapham.
- Mr Joseph Barrie Owen – President, Swansea Harriers Athletic Club. For services to Welsh Athletics.
- Mrs Sandra Kathleen Paddon – For services to the community in Sidcup, Kent.
- Professor Marilyn Palmer, FSA – For services to Industrial Archaeology and Heritage.
- Mr Michael Keith Palmer – Chairman, Waterway Recovery Group. For voluntary service to the Restoration of British Waterways.
- Mr Herbert John Park – For services to the community in Ballymena, Northern Ireland.
- Mrs Janet Elizabeth Park – Lately Pharmacist, Robertsonﾒs Pharmacy, Coatbridge. For services to Healthcare in Lanarkshire.
- Mrs Jillian Winifred Parker – Founder, Eastbourne Area Parents Action Group and the JPK Sussex Project, Eastbourne. For services to Children and Adults with a Learning Disability and their Families.
- Mr Trevor John Parkhill – Chairman, Hazelwood Integrated College. For services to Education in Northern Ireland.
- Mrs Aileen Margaret Parry – Chair of Governors, Oaklands School, Cheshire. For services to Special Educational Needs and Disabilities.
- Mr Naran Bhimji Patel – For services to the community and Community Cohesion in Cardiff.
- Mrs Aileen Francis Paterson – Author and Illustrator. For services to Children's Literature.
- Mrs Joanne Marie Pavey – Long-Distance Runner. For services to Athletics.
- Mr Jonathan Charles Pearse – For political and parliamentary service.
- Mrs Alison Mary Pendle – Founder and committee member, West Wiltshire Portage Service. For services to Special Educational Needs and Disabilities.
- Mrs Caroline Ann Peters – Chief Superintendent, Area Commander, Avon and Somerset Constabulary. For services to Policing.
- Dr Ian Joseph Peters – Lately committee member, Regulatory Policy Committee. For services to Regulatory Reform.
- Mrs Christine Ann Pickavance – For services to the community in Huddersfield, West Yorkshire.
- ~~Mr David John Henry Pickthall – Music Teacher, Brentwood School, Essex. For services to Education and to charity.~~
- Captain Robin Charles Plumley – Research Ship Manager, National Oceanography Centre. For services to Marine Science.
- Mrs Barbara Elaine Poole – Lately Operations Director, Acorn Learning Solutions Ltd. For services to Work-based Learning in Wales.
- Lt Col John Alexander Poole-Warren – Senior Executive Officer, Ministry of Defence. For services to the Army.
- Mr John Leslie Portch – Chairman, Avon County. For voluntary service to St John Ambulance.
- Ms Deborah Clare Potter – Chief Officer, Dorset Special Constabulary. For services to Policing.
- Mr Neil Innes Cameron Powrie Dl – For voluntary service to the community in Dundee.
- Mrs Sandra Price – For services to Netball in Coventry.
- Mrs Kathryn Elizabeth Pugh – Child and Adolescent Mental Health Programme Manager, NHS England. For services to Mental Health of Children and Young People.
- Professor Christopher Howard Raine – Consultant ENT Surgeon, Bradford Teaching Hospitals NHS Foundation Trust. For services to the NHS and Ear Trust Charity.
- Mr Hugh Howat Ramsay – For services to the Preservation of the Clydesdale Horse Breed.
- Ms Paulette Randall – Theatre Director and Producer. For services to Drama.
- The Reverend Roger Charles Redding – Chaplain to the Roma, Gypsy and Traveller community. For services to Interfaith Relations and community in the South West.
- Mrs Jane Victoria Redshaw – For services to the community and to charity in Wolverhampton, West Midlands and Bridgnorth, Shropshire.
- Mr Garry Douglas Reed – Headteacher, Swimbridge Church of England Primary School, North Devon. For services to Education.
- Mrs Adeline Reid – Founder, Keith Cancer Link. For services to Cancer Care in the North of Scotland.
- Mr Bruce Gavin Reid – Fundraiser, Fire Fighters Charity. For services to the Fire Fighters Charity and the community.
- Ms Sharmadean Reid – Founder, WAH London Ltd. For services to the Nail and Beauty Industry.
- Mrs Moira Elizabeth Rennie – Co-President, Rennie Grove Hospice Care. For services to Patients with Life Limiting Illnesses.
- Mr Lloyd Martin Richards – For services to the community in West Sussex.
- Mrs Joyce Roberts – Chair, Liverpool Church of England Council for Social Aid. For services to the community, particularly Women.
- Mr George Howard Robinson Mla – Member of the Legislative Assembly for East Londonderry. For public and political service.
- Mrs Frances Mary Rodgers – Volunteer, Early Years Sector and Founder, Rodett Playgroups. For services to Children and Early Education.
- Ms Elizabeth Margaret Ropschitz – Mental Health Co-ordinator, Resettlement and Care for Older Ex-Offenders and Prisoners. For services to Older Prisoners in Devon.
- Mrs Eleanor Ross – Dementia Strategy Lead Nurse Consultant, Public Health Agency. For services to Healthcare in Northern Ireland.
- Mrs Karen Rosalind Ross – Chief Executive, Relate Berkshire. For services to Children and Families.
- Mr Michael Robert Routledge – Foster Carer, Wirral. For services to Children and Families.
- Mrs Margaret Dorothy (Margot) Sampson – Chair, The Childrenﾒs Society Fundraising Committee in Winscombe, Somerset. For services to Children.
- Mr Jose Fabio Jesus Santos – Lately Artistic Director, Phakama. For services to Participatory Arts.
- Mr Richard Victor Saunders – Lately Chief Executive, GreaterSport. For services to Grassroots Sport in the North West.
- Mrs Caroline May Schwaller – Chair of NAVCA, National Association for Voluntary and Community Action and lately CEO, Keighley and Ilkley Voluntary and Community Action. For services to the community.
- Mrs Vera Selby – For services to Snooker and Billiards.
- Ms Jennifer Semahimbo – Programme Manager, Streetwise Project, Coventry. For services to Children.
- Mrs Pratima Sengupta – For services to the community in East Renfrewshire.
- Mrs Margaret Sewell – For voluntary service to the Women's Institute.
- Ms Yasvanti Govindji Lakhamshi Shah – Head of Adoption and Improvement, Kent County Council. For services to Children and Families.
- Mr Kiran Kumar Sharma – For services to Business and to charity in Berkshire.
- Mr William James Shaw – District Commissioner, West Belfast District Scout Council. For services to Scouting in Northern Ireland.
- Mr Iain Shepherd – Marine Systems Director, MARCOM Defence. For services to the Marine Sector and the Economy in Chichester, West Sussex.
- Ms Hayley Anne Sherwen – Constable and Mental Health Liaison Officer, Merseyside Police. For services to Mental Health.
- Mr George Crawford Shiels – Councillor, Magherafelt District Council. For services to Local Government and to the community in Mid Ulster.
- Mr Soames John Shillingford – Victim Support Officer, London Borough of Redbridge. For services to Victims and Witnesses.
- Mr Graham Robert Short – Lately Executive Director, Educational and Social Services, East Ayrshire Council. For services to Education.
- Mrs Harsha Yashwant Kumar Shukla – Chair, Lancaster and Morecambe Hindu Society and Chair, Lancaster District Communities Together Group. For services to Interfaith Relations.
- Mrs Jean Duncan Simpson – For services to Athletics.
- Ms Julia Elizabeth Simpson – West Thames Area Manager, Environment Agency. For services to communities at risk of Flooding.
- Mr Roy Simpson – For services to Education, Cricket and to the community in Durham.
- Mrs Elizabeth Sinclair-House – For services to Education and to the community in West London.
- Mr James George Thomas Smith – For services to the community in Crawley, West Sussex.
- Mrs Janet Mary Smith – Lately Executive Director of Therapies and Health Science, Aneurin Bevan University Health Board. For service to Therapy Services in Wales.
- Mr Paul Smith – Lately Chief Office Clerk, House of Commons. For parliamentary services.
- Mr Robin Anthony Smith Td Dl – For services to the community in Leeds.
- Mr William James Snelson – For services to the National Farmers Union and to the community in Bobbington, Staffordshire.
- Mrs Susan Clare Sotheran – For services to Girlguiding and to the community in Redcar, North Yorkshire.
- Mr Roger Leonard Speare – Chairman, Emmaus, Bolton. For services to the community in Bolton.
- Mr Kenneth Barry George Sproston – Lately University Secretary and Clerk to Governors, Staffordshire University. For services to Higher Education.
- Professor Susan Margaret Standring – For services to Anatomical Education.
- Mr Michael Frank Starbuck Bem – Higher Executive Officer, Ministry of Defence. For services to Defence.
- Miss Kathryn Startup – Ministry of Defence. For services to Defence.
- Ms Sue-Ann Steen – Chief Inspector, Police Service of Northern Ireland. For services to Policing and the community in Northern Ireland.
- Mr Lionel Geoffrey Stewart – For services to the community in Bedfordshire.
- Miss Casey Jean Stoney – Defender, Arsenal Ladies and England Women's Captain. For services to Football.
- Mr Gordon Hamish Stout – For services to Scouting and to Young People.
- Mr Joseph Gilfred Studholme – Lately Chair, The Salisbury Museum. For services to Museums.
- Mr Gordon Watson Summers – Assistant Director, Border Force, Home Office. For services to UK Border Safety.
- Mrs Pamela Lynn Tanner – Lately Chair, Torfaen Voluntary Alliance. For voluntary service to the community in Torfaen.
- Mr Nigel Owen Tansley – For services to the Fire and Rescue Service.
- Mrs Phillipa Victoria Rosslyn Tasker – For services to Young People in Bristol.
- Miss Sonia Margaret Tate – Executive Officer, Community Engagement Adviser, Work Services Directorate, Department for Work and Pensions. For services to Young People.
- Dr Clare Joanne Taylor – General Practitioner, Birmingham. For services to General Practice.
- Miss Coral Mary Patricia Taylor – For services to Heritage and to the community in Wakefield, West Yorkshire.
- Mr James Holmes Taylor – For services to Sport and charity.
- Mr Steve Taylor – Foster Carer. For services to Young People in Swansea.
- Mrs Wendy Taylor – Foster Carer. For services to Young People in Swansea.
- Mrs Elizabeth Catherine Eirios Thomas – County Organiser, Young Farmers' Club, Carmarthenshire. For voluntary and charitable service to Young Farmers.
- Mrs Celia Rachel Annie Todd – For services to the community in Foston, North Yorkshire.
- Mr Thomas Christoforos Toumazis – Chairman, ChildLine Board, London. For services to Children.
- Mr Gary Francis Tubman – Lately Matron, Acute, Intensive Care and Rehabilitation Service, South West London and St George's Mental Health NHS Trust. For services to Mental Health Nursing.
- Mrs Nicola Turner – Director of Employability, Aston University. For services to Higher Education and Graduate Employability.
- Mr John Alexander Vincent – Restaurateur. For services to School Food.
- Mr William Owain Walden-Jones – Lately Chief Executive, Hafal. For services to Mental Health Service Users and their Carers and Families.
- Mrs Marion Wallace – Lately Headteacher, Isobel Mair School and Family Centre, East Renfrewshire. For services to Education.
- Miss Alice Emerald Walters – Technical Lead, Metropolitan Police Service. For services to Forensic Firearms Examination.
- Mr Michael Kenneth Walton – Founder and Chair, The Ben Walton Trust. For services to Raising Awareness of Oral Cancer in the Medical and Dental Professions.
- Mr Edward Watson – Principal Dancer, The Royal Ballet. For services to Dance.
- Mrs Margaret Yvonne Watson – Foster Carer, Northumberland. For services to Children and Families.
- Mrs Jane Watt – Clinical Lead, Physiotherapist Regional Cancer Centre and Lymphoedema Lead, Northern Ireland Lymphoedema Network. For services to Physiotherapy and Lymphoedema Treatment.
- Mr Bryan Thomas Henderson Watts – Port Operative, Port of Bristol. For services to the Shipping Industry.
- Mrs Carol Wendy Weaver – For services to the community in Tattenhall, Cheshire.
- Mr Peter Webb – Founder and managing director, Electronic Temperature Instruments Ltd. For services to Business and the community in Worthing, West Sussex.
- Councillor William James Webb – Councillor, Newtownabbey Borough Council. For services to Local Government and the community.
- Mr Shaun Webster – For services to People with Learning Disabilities and their Families.
- Mrs Patricia Anne Weller – For voluntary and charitable services in Brighton and Hove.
- Mr Christopher Grahame Welsh – Director, Global and European Policy, Freight Transport Association. For services to Shippers and the Shipping Industry.
- Mrs Christine Whatton – Foster Carer, Wolverhampton. For services to Children and Families.
- Mr John Whatton – Foster Carer, Wolverhampton. For services to Children and Families.
- Miss Jordanne Joyce Whiley – Wheelchair Tennis Player. For services to Wheelchair Tennis.
- Mrs Kathryn Marie Whitlam – Chair of Trustees, RSPCA Sheffield Branch. For services to Animal Welfare.
- Mr Paul Wickes – Chief Executive, Cornwall Marine Network. For services to the Marine Industry and the community in Falmouth, Cornwall.
- Mr David John Widdas – Nurse Consultant. For services to Children and Young People with Complex Care Needs.
- Mrs Christine Mary Wilkinson – For services to the Textiles Industry.
- Mrs Janet Valerie Wilkinson – Communications Manager, Society of Motor Manufacturers and Traders. For services to the Motor Industry and charitable services.
- Mrs Sheila Williams – Volunteer, Petts Wood Playgroup, Kent. For services to Children with Special Educational Needs and their Families.
- Mr Robin Williamson – For voluntary service to Taxpayers.
- Mr Derek Wilson – President, Andros UK and Council Member, Institute of Directors. For services to Business.
- Mr Frank Wilson – For services to Festival Arts in the North East.
- Mr John Wilson – For services to Boxing, Young People and charity in Marlow, Buckinghamshire.
- Miss Sarah Katharine Winckless – For services to Sport and Young People.
- Mr Dylan Fitzpatrick Winder – Head of Humanitarian Policy and Partnerships, Department for International Development. For services to International Development particularly in the Philippines.
- Mr Patrick Leonard Wing Jp – For services to the community in Solihull and Birmingham, West Midlands.
- Councillor Elaine Margaret Woodburn – Lately Leader, Copeland Council. For services to Local Government.
- Colonel John Woodward – For services to Museums in Dorset.
- Mrs Deborah Jane Wright – Secretary to the Civil Procedure Rule Committee. Ministry of Justice. For services to Civil Justice.
- Mrs Helena Wyatt – Community Psychiatric Nurse, Oxfordshire. For services to Mental Health Nursing.

Diplomatic and Overseas List

- James Frank Amos, Community Volunteer. For services to the community in Bermuda.
- Linda Susan, Mrs. Bullen, Co-Founder, The Catherine Bullen Foundation. For services to relieve poverty, sickness, distress and the preservation of health in rural Namibia.
- Dr. John William Cann, formerly Chief Medical Officer, Ministry of Health Bermuda. For services to improving public health in Bermuda.
- Nathan John Cole, First Secretary, Foreign and Commonwealth Office. For services to British foreign policy.
- Ms Rachel Turner Forster, Relief and Development Volunteer and Consultant. For services to international development, humanitarian relief and poverty reduction.
- The Reverend Dennis George Fowler, Author and Researcher. For services to botanical research and the preservation of the Ila people’s culture.
- Dr. Keith Campbell Franklin, First Secretary Nuclear, British Embassy, Tokyo, Japan. For services to UK/Japan relations in the field of nuclear energy.
- Robin Eric Garland, Chairman, The Project Mala Charitable Trust. For services to improving education and life prospects of children in India.
- Michael Gil, Retired Chief Technical Officer, H.M. Government of Gibraltar. For service to the Government of Gibraltar.
- Ms Christine Bridget Gordon, Founder, the Rehabilitation Institute for Autism and Related Communication Disorders. For services to charitable interests, education and UK-Bahraini relations.
- Joel Grattan Guinness, First Secretary, Foreign and Commonwealth Office. For service to British foreign policy.
- Derek William Haines, Senior Manager, Security and Community Relations, Dart Enterprises, George Town. For services to community services and sport in the Cayman Islands.
- John Joseph Law, President, British Chamber of Commerce, Italy. For services to British trade and investment in Italy.
- Mark John James Leppard, The Principal of Doha College, Qatar. For services to British education in Qatar.
- Margaret Jean, Mrs. Long, Co-Founder, Children of Fiji. For services to early childhood and special needs in Fiji.
- Dr. Peter Michael Long, Co-Founder, Children of Fiji. For services to early childhood and special needs in Fiji.
- Dr. David Richard Marsh, Chair, British-American Business Association. For services to British-American business.
- Declan McCavana, Senior Lecturer, Ecole Polytechnique, and President, French Debating Association. For services to the promotion of the English language in France.
- Jonathan William Andrew McIvor, Director, Siren Associates, Lebanon. For services to stability in the Middle East.
- Ms Elizabeth Ann McLaren, Manager, Accreditation UK, British Council. For services to UK English language schools.
- Ms Elizabeth Mehta, Founding Director, Muktangan Schools Network. For services to education in India.
- Jeffrey James Mitchell, Vice Consul, British Embassy, Bangkok, Thailand. For services to British nationals in Thailand.
- Ms Sarah Jane Morris, Formerly Deputy Head of Conference and Events Team, Protocol Directorate, Foreign and Commonwealth Office. For services to FCO and British interests.
- Ms Sandra Anne Owen, Governor, British Community Assistance Fund. For services to the British community in the United Arab Emirates.
- Thomas Patrick Phipps, Second Secretary Political, British Embassy, Manila, Philippines. For services to conflict resolution in the Philippines.
- Stephen Pollard, First Secretary, Foreign and Commonwealth Office. For service to British foreign policy.
- William Frank Pooley, Nurse. For services to combating Ebola in Africa.
- Ms Caroline Jane Quinn, formerly Second Secretary Human Rights, British Embassy, Beijing, China. For services to Human Rights in China.
- Dilip Dayaram Tirathdas, Retired Financial Secretary, Gibraltar. For public service in Gibraltar.
- Ms Joanna Lindsey Waddington, Founder of Ace Africa, Kenya, UK and Tanzania. For services to deprived children and communities in Kenya and Tanzania.
- Paul Richard Walsh, Founder, Jungle Crows Foundation, Kolkata, India. For services to youth in Kolkata and to British interest in India.
- Charlotte Elizabeth, Mrs. Webb, Volunteer. For services to remembering and promoting the work of Bletchley Park.

Crown Dependencies

Isle of Man

- Ms Alison Jane Gomme. For services to the Isle of Man Prison and Probation Services.

Guernsey

- Josephine, Mrs. Boyd. For services to Hospice Care.

Jersey'

- Dr. Gari Purcell-Jones. For services to Jersey Hospice Care.
- Jurat Paul Liddiard. For services to forensic and conventional dentistry in less-developed countrie

=== Royal Victorian Medal (RVM) ===
Gold

- Roger Edward Standen RVM – Linen Room Assistant, Royal Household.

Silver

- Brian Dixon – Water Services Operator, Crown Estate, Windsor.
- James Duncan – Yeoman Warder, H.M. Tower of London.
- Stuart Laurence Fitch – Gardener, Sandringham Estate.
- David Grimson – Livery Porter, Buckingham Palace. (To be dated 22 April 2015.)
- Keith Jackson – Gardener, Buckingham Palace.
- David Wolfgang Lowe – Chauffeur, Royal Household.
- Nicholas Simon Matthews – Warden, Crown Estate, Windsor.
- Andrew Reddy – Gardener, Household of The Duke of York.

=== British Empire Medal (BEM) ===
British Empire Medal (Civil division) ribbon

- Gordon Lewis Aikman. For services to Motor Neurone Disease Awareness and Research.
- Miss Regina Allanah. For voluntary service to the community in the London Borough of Haringey.
- Iris Anderson. For services to Diversity in Government.
- Miss Susanne Carol Anderson. For services to Peace and Reconciliation in Bushmills and Moyle District, County Antrim.
- Timothy Anderson. For services to the community in Northern Ireland.
- Robin Cyril Arch. For services to the community in Great Doddington, Northamptonshire.
- Andrew Michael Arrowsmith. For services to charity in Southwell, Nottinghamshire.
- Clarence Herbert Atterby, President, Boston Conservative Association. For voluntary political service.
- Mrs Helen Mary Ayling, Vice-Chair of Governors, Uplands School, Sandhurst. For services to Education.
- Mrs Olga Daisy Bainbridge J.P. For services to the community in Shildon, Durham.
- Mrs Patricia Anne Barker, J.P. For services to the community in Haverfordwest, Pembrokeshire.
- Mrs Ann Barlow, Homewatch Co-ordinator, Ashton-Under-Lyne. For services to Community Safety and Equal Opportunities.
- Mrs Elizabeth Ann Barrett. For voluntary service to Public Rights of Way Network in East Anglia.
- Ms Laura Carolyn Bates, Founder, Everyday Sexism Project. For services to gender equality.
- Mrs Joan Muriel Gladys Bell. For services to Performing Arts in Northern Ireland.
- Mrs Susan Joan Bell. For services to Diving.
- Mrs Rosemary Anne Bennett, J.P. For services to the community in Newbury, Berkshire.
- Julian Peter Charles Birley, Chairman, North Norfolk Railway. For services to Railway Heritage.
- John Edward Blackwell. For voluntary service on the Isle of Luing.
- Mrs Deborah Jane Blake, Business Administrative Specialist – Litigation, HMP Isle of Wight. For services to HM Prison Service.
- John Christopher Boocock. For voluntary services to the community in Barton, Cambridgeshire.
- Mrs Mary Ann Booker. For voluntary service to the Childrenﾒs Hearings System in Scotland and Riding for the Disabled in Aberdeenshire.
- Kenneth Boon, Professional Driver, Royal Mail Group. For services to the Royal Mail and charitable fundraising.
- Mrs Carolyn Louise Booth. For services to the community in Aire Valley.
- Ms Marilyne Boothe, Diary Secretary to the Chancellor, HM Treasury. For services to Public Administration and Diversity.
- Mrs Doris Maureen Bowen. For services to the community in Beulah, Powys.
- Mrs Olwen Edith Bowen. For services to the community in Llanbister, Powys.
- Donald Braithwaite. For services to Boxing and to Young People in Caerphilly.
- Mrs Patricia Elizabeth Brian. For services to the community in Frodsham and Helsby, Cheshire.
- Mrs Jennifer Brisker. For voluntary and charitable services.
- Ernest Broom. For services to the community in Bury St Edmunds, Suffolk.
- Norman Brown. Secretary and Controller, Royal Pioneer Corps Association. For services to the Pioneer Regiment.
- Mrs Catherine Wallace Brunton. For services to the community in North-East Fife.
- Simon Robert Budd. For services to the community in Brockham, Surrey.
- John Robetson (Jack) Burgess, Public Relations Officer, Scottish Saltire Association. For services to Military Aviation.
- Miss Patricia Gillian Hampden Raynor Burstall. For voluntary service to the community in Bisham Village, Buckinghamshire.
- Mrs Eileen Margaret Caldwell. For services to charitable fundraising and the community in Portrush, Northern Ireland.
- Mrs Anne Callaghan, Parenting Practitioner, Nottinghamshire. For services to Children and Families.
- Miss Edith Jean Calway, Wings Appeal Officer, Bristol Branch. For voluntary service to the RAF Association and to the community.
- Miss Susan Alison Cameron. For voluntary service to Youth Advantage Outreach in Aberdeenshire.
- Mrs Jacquelyn Carmichael, Preschool Manageress, Robertson Barracks. For services to Service Families.
- Graham Robert Carpenter, Chief Executive, Dandelion Time. For services to Young People and Families in Kent.
- Miss Catherine Carter, Head of Humanitarian Information and Communication, Save the Children. For humanitarian services, particularly for Syria.
- George Alfred Carter. For services to the community in Stokesley, North Yorkshire.
- Sqn Ldr David Chappell, R.A.F. (Rtd.), Higher Executive Officer, Ministry of Defence. For services to the RAF and to Conservation.
- Robin Clayton. For services to Hospital Radio, West Yorkshire.
- Ms Bridget Ann Cluley, Trustee, Hope and Homes for Children and Fundraiser, Divisional Vice-President and Trustee, NSPCC. For services to Children and Families.
- Mrs Sheila Collins. For services to the community in the Mournes.
- Arthur Hugh Conway-Jones. For services to Heritage in Gloucester.
- Mrs Ann Marie Corbet, Childminder, Bradford. For services to Children.
- Mrs Patricia Anne Corrick. For services to the community in Draycott and Rodney Stoke, Somerset.
- Mrs Jean Craghill. For services to the community in Holmrook, Cumbria.
- Mrs Tracey Ann Creed . For services to the community in Guston, Kent.
- Miss Katie Elizabeth Cutler. For services to Fundraising in the community in Gateshead, Tyne and Wear.
- Kenneth Aubrey Dalton. For services to the community in Blaby, Leicestershire.
- Percy George Davey. For services to Young People in Crediton, Devon through the Scout Movement.
- Mrs Hazel Joan Davies, Lately Lollipop Lady, Maes-Y-Coed School, Cardiff. For services to Children and Road Safety.
- Miss Rhiannon Eleri Davies, Welsh Language Officer, Aneurin Bevan University Health Board. For services to the Promotion of the Welsh Language in the NHS in South East Wales.
- Mrs Susan Joan Davies. For services to the community in Bristol.
- Mrs Linda Dawson. For services to the Millennium Green in Hoddlesden, Lancashire.
- Malcolm Dawson, Security Operations Manager, University of Leeds. For services to Higher Education and Students.
- Mrs Victoria Margaret Dawson, Museum Volunteer. For services to Museums in the South West of England.
- Councillor Frank Alan Delderfield. For services to the communities in Great Totham and Maldon, Essex.
- Mrs Carol Florence Doey. For services to the community in Cookstown, County Tyrone.
- Cornelius George Donovan. For services to Business and Charity in Essex.
- Andrew Richard George Dow. For services to Railway Heritage.
- Mrs Joan Downing, Councillor, Westfield Parish Council, East Sussex. For services to Rural Inclusion.
- Mrs Edith May Duberley, Lately Postmistress. For services to the community in Ruardean, Gloucestershire.
- Mrs Julie Dudgeon, J.P. For services to charitable fundraising in the North East.
- John Emery, Rugby Volunteer. For services to Grassroots Rugby in Gloucestershire.
- Mrs Alice Jean Evans. For services to the West Suffolk Group of Riding for the Disabled and to the community in Barrow, Suffolk.
- Christopher James Sydney Evans, Volunteer, Ashford Cricket Club. For services to Grassroots Cricket.
- Edward Watkin Evans, Poppy Appeal Organiser, North Wales. For voluntary service to the Royal British Legion.
- Mrs Karen Elizabeth Evans, Domestic Abuse Forum Chair, Rushmoor and Hart Districts, Hampshire Constabulary. For services to Protecting Victims of Domestic Abuse.
- Mrs Sandra Jane Evans, Childminder and Community Leader, Hertfordshire. For services to Children and Families.
- Barry John Ewington, President, Nuneaton Harriers. For services to Athletics in the Midlands.
- Christopher Stuart Fairhurst. For voluntary service to the community in Garth, Llangammarch Wells, Powys.
- Ms Jennie Ferrigno, Tenant board member and Chair, Red Kite Community Housing. For services to the community of Wycombe.
- Mrs Elaine Lilian Ferry, Dance Teacher and Principal, Three Spires Dance School. For services to Dance in Coventry.
- Mrs Myrna Rae Festing. For services to the community in Rye, East Sussex.
- Mrs Constance Mary Foster. For services to the community in Castle Sowerby and Sebergham, Cumbria.
- John Alan Foster. For services to the community in Castle Sowerby and Sebergham, Cumbria.
- Mrs Caroline Estella Fowke, Volunteer, Wiltshire Dyslexia Association and Governor, Sheldon School, Wiltshire. For services to Children with Special Educational Needs and Disabilities.
- Gary Malcolm Francis. For services to the community in Gosport, Hampshire.
- Mrs Flora Frank. For services to the Jewish community and to charity in Edgware, North London.
- Mrs Carole Ann Garrett, Director, Profit Optimiser. For services to Enterprise and Skills in Burnley.
- Mrs Joyce Gee. For services to Children and Young People with Special Needs through The Deanne Gee Memorial Fund in York.
- Michael Gee, Rugby Volunteer. For services to Rugby in the South West.
- Mrs Marion Elizabeth Giles. For services to the community, especially the Millom Recreation Centre in Cumbria.
- Mrs Ruth Glenn. For services to People with Learning Disabilities through the Swanley Cygnet Club in Kent.
- Robert Kenneth Goodman, Bandmaster, Britannia Band. For services to Music in Northern Ireland.
- Mrs Judith Beatrice Graham, Volunteer Fundraising Supporter, Chelsea Branch chairman, NSPCC. For services to Children.
- Donald Cumming Grant, Voluntary Observer, Dunbar Weather Station. For services to Meteorology through the Voluntary Weather Observing Network.
- Mrs Margaret Gray. For services to the community, especially to the Heaton Graveyard in Bradford, West Yorkshire.
- Sister Maureen Greaves. For services to the community in North Sheffield.
- Mrs Laura Kathleen Greenaway. For services to Young People and to the community in Northern Ireland.
- Brian Gregson, Chair, Old Colwyn Scout Group Committee. For voluntary and charitable service to the community in Conwy.
- Bibi Tej Kaur Grewal. For services to Interfaith Relations and the Sikh community in Berkshire.
- Mrs Lorraine Margaret Grocott, Clerk, Milland Parish Council. For services to the community in Milland, West Sussex.
- Mrs Uttamjit Gujral. Head of Community Partnerships, London Borough of Hounslow. For services to the community in Hounslow.
- Mrs Jane Hilary Gurney. For services to Adults with Learning and Physical Difficulties through the Target Club in Stowmarket, Suffolk.
- Mrs Hilary Eleanor Halliday, Public Relations Officer, Newry and Mourne District Council. For services to Local Government.
- Mrs Angela Mary Harris. For services to the Hanwell Neighbourly Care Scheme in West London.
- Bashir Hasham. For services to the community in Orkney.
- Gregory Hawkins. Rugby Volunteer. For services to Rugby in the North West.
- Mrs Janet Elizabeth Haylett. For services to the community in Long and Little Wittenham, Oxfordshire.
- Peter Stanley Albert Hayman. For services to the community in Northiam, East Sussex.
- Kenneth John Headley, Fundraiser, RNLI. For services to Maritime Safety.
- Mrs Edna Hilda Heappey. For services to charity and to the community in Sutton Coldfield, West Midlands.
- Ms Anne Heath, Trustee, Home-Start Westminster. For services to Children and Families.
- Mrs Elizabeth Hewitt. For services to the community in Hawarden and Mancot, Flintshire.
- Cdr (Retd) Anthony Higham. For services to the community in Hambledon, Hampshire and for charitable service.
- Dr Peter John Hine, Founder and Chair, West Yorkshire National Trust Volunteers. For services to Heritage.
- Carl Hingley, Senior Automotive Technician, School of Mechanical Engineering, University of Birmingham. For services to Mechanical Engineering.
- Jeremy Hobbs. For services to charity, especially Compton Hospice in Wolverhampton, West Midlands.
- Mrs Kay Louise Holmes, District Commissioner, Cardiff East and South Scouts. For services to Young People in Cardiff.
- Mrs Mary Elizabeth Horne. For services to the community in Walton on Trent, Derbyshire.
- Mrs Josephine Ann Horner. For services to the Citizens Advice Bureau in Stroud.
- Gary Edward Howard, Lately Chief Office Clerk, House of Commons. For parliamentary service and voluntary service to the Scout Movement.
- Miss Mary Norah Howse. For services to the community in Beckley and Rye, East Sussex.
- Mrs Dorothy Huddart, Fundraiser, Penrith Branch, British Red Cross. For charitable services.
- Councillor Clare Ceridwen Hughes. For voluntary service to the community in Pontrhydfendigaid, Ceredigion.
- Ms Katherine Hughes. For voluntary service to the community in Caerphilly and to the Environment in Wales.
- Maurice Jason Humphris, D.L, J.P. For services to the community in Banbury, Oxfordshire.
- Keith Reginald Hunt. For services to Sport and to the community in Reading and Wokingham, Berkshire.
- Mrs Rahanara Sadia Hussain. For services to Diversity Inclusion and the community.
- Mrs Josephine Jane Jordan Hutchinson. For services to the Arts in Worthing.
- Mrs Mary Isaac. For services to Heritage in the South West.
- Vernon Lewis Jennings. For services to the Barns Green Half Marathon and to the community in Barns Green, West Sussex.
- Councillor Douglas James John. For services to the community in Pencoed, Bridgend.
- Donald Johnson. For services to the community in Winterton, North Lincolnshire.
- Mrs Shirley Johnston, Sub Post Mistress, Culkey, County Fermanagh. For services to the Post Office and to the community in Culkey.
- Allan Frederick Jones, Honorary President, Edmonton Unit, Sea Cadet Corps. For voluntary service.
- Mrs Doris Mary Jones, Councillor, Darlington Borough Council and Chair, Middleton St George Parish Council. For services to the community in County Durham.
- Miss Gillian Avril Jones. For voluntary service to the community in Llanrhystud, Ceredigion.
- Peter Carter Jones. For services to the Establishment of the Welsh National First World War Memorial in Flanders, Belgium.
- William Wallace Jones, Church Organist. For services to Music in North Ayrshire.
- Mrs Ruth Lesley Jubert, Chair, Home Start Guildford. For services to Children and Families.
- Mrs Claire Judge, Lately Volunteer, Development Committee, Ashurst Wood Community Pre-School. For services to Early Years Education.
- Matthew James Ivan Kee. For services to Fundraising in Fermanagh and Trillick.
- Peter Kelly, Founder and Volunteer, the Arrows Basketball Club, Sheffield. For services to Physical Education.
- Mrs Ursula Kent, Group Leader and co-ordinator, Elmbridge University of the Third Age. For services to Adult Learning.
- Mrs Ann Muir Kerr, Chair, Motor Neurone Disease Association Central Scotland Committee. For services to charitable fundraising.
- Raymond Michael Key. For services to the Craft of Wood Turning.
- Mrs Elizabeth Keys. For services to Young People in Northern Ireland.
- Ms Taryn Khanam, Department of Energy and Climate Change. For services to Diversity in Government and the Bengali community in East London.
- Anthony Dinham King, Volunteer, National Coastwatch Institution. For services to Maritime Safety.
- Miss Mavis Sarah Eleanor Kirk, Administrative Officer, Ministry of Defence. For services to Defence and voluntary service to Young People.
- Mrs June Knightley. For services to the community in Houghton and Hetton, Tyne and Wear.
- Mrs Hazel Olive Knowles, President, Halesowen Unit, St John Ambulance. For voluntary service to First Aid.
- Peter Norman Knowles. For services to the community in West Chiltington, West Sussex.
- Mrs Katherine Grace Laing. For services to the community in Dalwood, East Devon.
- Miss Natasha Lambert. For services to charity.
- Mrs Deborah Alison Lammin, Choir Mistress, Burntwood School Chamber Choir, London. For services to Education.
- Mrs Rita Langford. For services to the community and to charity in Kington, Herefordshire.
- John Laverty, Lately Field Officer, South Eastern Education and Library Board. For services to Young People in Northern Ireland.
- Gordon Lawrie. For services to Piping in Dunbartonshire.
- Alison Lawson, Special Documents Officer Department for Business, Innovation and Skills. For services to Security and Information Rights.
- Ms Janina Barbara Lazarski, Volunteering Coordinator, University of Winchester. For services to Higher Education and to the community in Hampshire.
- Mrs Hilary Ann Ledbrook. For services to the community in Ashorne, Warwickshire.
- Mrs Evelyn Christian Munro Lennie. For services to the Childrenﾒs Hearings System in Scotland.
- Mrs Cherry Netta Leppard. For voluntary service to the community in Kent.
- Mrs Catherine Lewis. For services to the community in Sheerness, Kent.
- Desmond Norman Libby. For services to the community in Polruan, Cornwall.
- Mrs Anne Robson Lloyd, Drama Teacher, Fenham, Newcastle upon Tyne. For services to Education and to the community in Newcastle upon Tyne.
- Ms Lorraine Lloyd. For services to the community in Welshpool, Powys.
- Mrs Eileen Lochhead, Occupational Therapy Care Group Lead, Paediatrics, NHS Lanarkshire. For services to Healthcare.
- Mrs Jean Loudon. For voluntary service in Glasgow.
- Martyn Loukes, Chair, LGBT Staff Network, Transport for London. For services to Diversity in the Workplace.
- Yuk Shan Lui. For services to Cultural Diversity and Education in Northern Ireland.
- Mrs Anne Frances Maccallum, Head of Specialist Services, Gloucestershire Care Services NHS Trust. For services to Nursing.
- Neil Macleod. For services to Crofting and the community in the Western Isles.
- Ian Roderick Macneill, J.P. For services to the community in Salford, Greater Manchester.
- Mrs Amanda Mactaggart. For services to the community in Glasgow and West Dunbartonshire.
- Samuel James Malcolmson. For voluntary service to Patients at Musgrave Park Hospital, Northern Ireland.
- Ms Narpinderjit Mann, Volunteer Worker and Community Project Co-ordinator, UNITED SIKHS, London Borough of Ealing. For services to the Sikh community.
- Mrs Bridget Rosemary Marshall, Yorkshire County Organiser, National Gardens Scheme. For services to charitable fundraising.
- John David Marshall. For services to Built Heritage in Northern Ireland.
- Peter Gregory Mason, Chair, Sir Tom Finney Preston Soccer Development Centre. For services to Amateur Sport.
- Captain Reginald Vivian May. For services to the community in Bridport, Dorset.
- Ms Nancy Mcadam, Member, Inverness Dementia Memory Group. For services to People with Dementia.
- Mrs Mary McAlinden. For services to the community in County Armagh, Northern Ireland.
- Sgt Major Jonathan Hugh McDonald, Detachment Commander, Nairn, Army Cadet Force. For voluntary service.
- Mrs Heather Mccoll McIntosh, Cub Leader – Glenkens Cub Scout Pack. For services to the Scouting Movement and to the community in Dumfries and Galloway.
- Mrs Annie Watt Amos McKenzie. For services to the Ochil Care Home and the community in Perthshire.
- Ms Julie McKirdy, Library Supervisor, Thimblemill Library. For services to the community in Smethwick, West Midlands.
- Mrs Gillian McWhirter, Secretary, Multiple Sclerosis Society Ross-shire Branch. For services to Healthcare.
- Mrs Glenda Mee, Teaching Assistant, Impington Village College, Cambridgeshire. For services to Young People with Special Educational Needs and Disabilities.
- Michael Charles Mellor. For services to the Chase Arts in Public Spaces Organisation and to the community in Cannock, Staffordshire.
- John Gilbert Millington. For services to the community in Witcombe and Bentham, Gloucestershire.
- Dr William Patrick Campbell Mills. For services to the community in Westerleigh, Bristol.
- Zafran Mohammed, Director, All 4 Youth. For services to Young People and the community in Birmingham.
- James Montgomery, Club Ambassador, Sunderland Association Football Club. For services to Football.
- Mrs Jean Montgomery. For services to the Cub and Scout Movement in Reddish, Greater Manchester.
- Mrs Monica Joan Moreton. For services to Young People through the Girl Guiding Movement in Aldbourne.
- John Alexander Muir, D.L, J.P., Secretary, Italian Chapel Preservation Society. For voluntary service in Orkney.
- Peter Mulholland. For services to Athletics in Wimbledon.
- Mrs Lesley Jane Munt. For services to the community in Brockenhurst, Hampshire.
- Mrs Helen Isabella Murchison. For services to the community in Lochcarron, Ross-shire.
- Mrs Susan Mary Myatt. For services to the community in Chadlington, Oxfordshire.
- Mrs Jean Shirley Napier, Secretary, Northampton Division, SSAFA. For voluntary service to Armed Forces Personnel.
- Mrs Judith Neale. For services to the community in Hanwell, West London.
- Jarlath James Newman, Regimental Sergeant Major Instructor, 2nd NI Battalion, Army Cadet Force. For services to Young People and to the community in Northern Ireland.
- Mrs Julie Nixon, Foster Carer, Credocare, Kent. For services to Children and Families.
- Mrs Muriel Ann O'Driscoll Sexual Health Nurse, Brook. For services to Nursing.
- Joseph Patrick Owens. For services to Scouting in County Fermanagh, Northern Ireland.
- Mrs Anita May Parker, Founder, Woodside Farm Stables, Riding for the Disabled Association. For services to People with Disabilities.
- Mrs Iris Paterson, Catering Assistant, University of Aberdeen. For services to Student Catering.
- Andrew Joseph Patton. For services to the community in Sion Mills, Northern Ireland.
- Mrs Jean Eileen Elizabeth Peasley. For services to the community in Bourne End, Buckinghamshire.
- Mrs Marion Percy. For services to the community in Colwall, Worcestershire.
- Mrs Joan Perkin. For voluntary service to the community in Paddington Green, London.
- Dr Maria-Luisa Marino Pettigrew, General Practitioner, London. For services to International Primary Care.
- Mrs Irene Mary Maud Phillips, Treasurer, Kington Unit, St John Ambulance. For voluntary service to First Aid.
- Mrs Sheila Margaret Pick. For services to the Scout Movement in Leicestershire and Northamptonshire.
- David Henry George Pinfold. For services to the community, especially in the East Downland Benefice, Newbury, Berkshire.
- Trevor Pitman, Technical Manager, School of Biological Sciences, University of Reading. For services to Higher Education.
- Michael John Polkinghorne-Kerris. For services to Young People through the Scout Movement.
- Mrs Elizabeth Pooley. For voluntary political service in Chesham and Amersham, Buckinghamshire.
- Mrs Evelyn Porter. For services to the Girls' Brigade in Saltcoats, Ayrshire.
- Mrs Sylvia Rosalind Prestwich. For services to the community in Titchmarsh, Northamptonshire.
- Ms Maurizia Quarta, Volunteer, Co-founder and Chair of Wiltshire, Parent Carer Council. For services to Children and Families.
- Andrew Howard Quick, xdandcc Website Developer. For services for Retired Police Officers.
- Mrs Gloria Hill Reeves. For services to charitable fundraising.
- Peter Reilly. For services to the community in Saltcoats, Ayrshire.
- Frank Linden Riley, Special Constable, Greater Manchester Police. For services to Policing.
- Ms Josephine Roach, Founder, Pedal Power. For services to Widening Participation in Sport.
- Donald John Roberts. For services to Young People through Swimming and to Bellringing in Torquay, Devon.
- Mrs Elizabeth Ann Robinson. For services to the community in Throckley, Tyne and Wear.
- Mrs Margaret Ann Irene Robinson, Trustee, Fountainville Trust. For services to the Scout Movement in Northern Ireland.
- Ms Gail Robson. For services to Gymnastics in North Tyneside.
- Ms Veronica Marian Rodgers, Officer, Western Education and Library Board. For services to Young People.
- Mrs Yvonne Lea Rodgers. For services to the St Stephen's Drop-In Centre in Twickenham, London.
- Mrs Diana Betty Rout. For services to the community in Shurdington, Gloucestershire.
- Mrs Elizabeth Monica Sains. For services to the Conservation of Withcote Chapel.
- Mrs Jean Christina Schofield, Chair, Porthcawl Branch, Kidney Research Unit for Wales Foundation. For services to Kidney Research.
- Miss Roberta Scott. For services to Music in the community in Coleraine.
- Robert Sewell, Volunteer Cadet Unit Leader, Metropolitan Police Service. For services to Young People and the community in Newham.
- Mrs Roberta Sharpe. For services to Gymnastics.
- Mrs Mavin Elizabeth Skene Shulver. For services to the community in Bungay, Suffolk.
- Ms Heather Ann Shute. For voluntary services to Disabled People and the community in Oxfordshire.
- Ms Harbans Kaur Sidhu, Volunteer Worker, UNITED SIKHS, London Borough of Ealing. For services to the Sikh community.
- Douglas Taylor Sim, Chairman, St Bees Parish Council. For services to the community in St Bees, Cumbria.
- Ronald Simpson, company secretary, Uppingham First. For services to Community Planning in Uppingham, Rutland.
- Albert Edward Skeates. For services to the community in Blaenau Gwent.
- Mrs Joan Mary Slaney. For services to the community in Beckenham.
- David Anthony Small, Founder and Musical Director, Penclawdd Brass Band. For services to Music in Swansea.
- Mrs Agnes Caldwell Smith T.D. Caseworker and Fundraising Coordinator, Glasgow Branch, SSAFA. For voluntary service to Armed Forces Personnel.
- Miss Margaret Mary Smith, Volunteer, Aberdeen Branch, Samaritans. For voluntary service in Aberdeenshire.
- Philip Edward Smith. For services to the community in Sherington, Buckinghamshire.
- Mrs Mary Louisa Snell, Voluntary School Swimming Assistant, Liskeard, Cornwall. For services to Physical Education.
- Mrs Veena Soni, Head, Ethnic Minority and Traveller Achievement Service, Gateshead Council. For services to the community in Tyne and Wear.
- Richard Francis John Steel. For services to the community and to charity in Winchester, Hampshire.
- Mrs Marion Hope Sterritt. For voluntary services to the community in Northern Ireland.
- Miss Yla Lesley Steven, Conductor and Musical Director, Edinburgh Highland Reel and Strathspey Society. For services to Scottish Music.
- Miss Linda Caroline Strachan, Founder, Newham Swords Fencing Club. For services to Community Sport.
- Mrs Veronica Stuart, Volunteer, Melford Hall, Suffolk. For services to Heritage.
- Mrs Joy Sullivan, Export Adviser, North East Chamber of Commerce International Trade Team. For services to International Trade.
- Stephen Sutcliffe, Project Leader, Renovation of Skokholm Island. For voluntary service to Conservation, particularly Ornithology on Skokholm Island, Pembrokeshire.
- Mrs Janet Swift, Administrative Officer, Department for Work and Pensions. For services to Welfare and voluntary service to the Rotherham Neuro Support Group.
- Dr Janet Felicity Tait. For voluntary and charitable services to the community in Aldeburgh, Suffolk and through Save the Children.
- Stephen James Tatnell, Hospital Porter, Cardiff and Vale University Health Board. For services to the NHS in Cardiff and services to Charitable Fundraising.
- Mrs Mary Joan Taylor. For services to the community in Burwash, East Sussex.
- Mrs Verna Elsie Tripconey. For services to the East Lizard Helpline and to the community in Helston, Cornwall.
- Mrs Barbara Anne Turner. For services to the community in Holymoorside and Chesterfield, Derbyshire.
- Philippe Turner, External Relations and Development, Second Wave Youth Arts, London. For services to Young People, Police and Community Engagement.
- Vartan Giaragos Vartoukian, Cinema Manager, Gibraltar Barracks. For services to Armed Forces Personnel.
- Mrs Karen Vaughan, Higher Officer, Personal Tax Operations, Portsmouth, HM Revenue and Customs. For services to Tax Collection and charity.
- Maurice Vaughan. For services to Cricket in Etwall.
- Jonathan Venner, Organist and Choirmaster, Church of St Edward the Confessor, Romford. For services to Choral Music.
- Mrs Clare Melody Waggett. For services to Young People through the Scout Movement and the community.
- Mrs Carol Susan Wain. For charitable services and services to the community in Anglesey.
- Mrs Ann Susan Walkden-Williams. For charitable services and services to the community in Prestatyn, Denbighshire.
- Mrs Christine Shirley Ward. For voluntary service to the community in Upminster and Cranham.
- Mrs Susan Ward – Chair, West Durrington Phoenix Youth Group. For services to Children and the community in West Durrington.
- Michael Derek Warrilow J.P. Community Fire Safety Officer, Staffordshire Fire and Rescue Service. For services to the community in Stoke-on-Trent.
- Arthur Edmeston Watson, Co-Owner, The Riverside Restaurant. For services to the Hospitality Industry in the South West.
- Mrs Janet Watson Co-Owner, The Riverside Restaurant. For services to the Hospitality Industry in the South West.
- Ms Linda Watson, Co-ordinator, Caw/Nelson Drive Action Group, Londonderry. For services to the community.
- Mrs Ann Marie Wheatley, Volunteer, Maryhill and Possilpark Citizens Advice Bureau. For voluntary service in Glasgow.
- Mrs Amanda Jane Williams, Chair, Independent Monitoring Board, HMP Brixton. For services to Prisoners.
- Mrs Wendy Williams, Dysphagia Specialist Nurse, Betsi Cadwaladr University Health Board. For services to Adult Nursing for People with Learning Disabilities in North Wales.
- Ms Florence Dianne Wilson, Higher Executive Officer, Ministry of Defence. For services to Defence and the community in Lisburn.
- Mrs Irene Marianne Wilson. For services to the community in Enfield.
- Mrs Patricia Anne Wilson. For services to Young People through the Girlguiding Movement in Cheshire.
- Andrew Stephen Wood, Executive Chef, University of York. For services to Higher Education and University Catering.
- David Woodhead. For services to Fell Running.
- Mrs Eileen Frances Woodhead. For services to Fell Running.
- Miss Rowenna Jane Woodward. For services to Young People in Surrey and West Sussex through the Guide and Scout Movements.
- Mrs Edna Doris Woolsey. For services to the community in Stalham, Norfolk.
- Mrs Veronica Wootton, Information Officer, Ministry of Defence. For services to RAF Leuchers Personnel and their Families.
- Mrs Christine Joyce Wright. For services to Cancer Research and to the community in Selkirk, Scottish Borders.
- Stephen James Wright. For services to the community in Grassmoor, Hasland and Temple Normanton, Derbyshire.
- Major Michael John Wyatt, Volunteer. For services to the Restoration of the Reading Section of the Kennet and Avon Canal.
- Samuel Oliver Young. For services to Alcoholics Anonymous in Castlederg, County Tyrone.

== Bahamas ==
=== Knight Bachelor ===
- The Honourable Hartman Godfrey Longley, Chief Justice of the Commonwealth of the Bahamas. For services to the Commonwealth of the Bahamas.

== Cook Islands ==
=== Member of the Order of the British Empire (MBE) ===
Civil

- Manea Tuoteote o Karaemura Turepu. For services to the Public Service and to the community.

=== British Empire Medal (BEM) ===
Civil

- Barry Albert Hill. For services to the community.
- Rongo Tama Taia. For services to the community.

== Grenada ==
=== Officer of the Order of the British Empire (OBE) ===
Civil

- Gordon Vivian De La Mothe. For services to Art.
- Dr. Slinger Francisco. For services to Culture.

=== Member of the Order of the British Empire (MBE) ===
Civil

- Sheril, Mrs. Edwards-Courtney. For services to business and the community.

=== British Empire Medal (BEM) ===
Civil

- Ms Heather Albanie. For services to the community.
- Paul R. A. Jeremiah. For services to farming.

== Papua New Guinea ==
=== Knight Bachelor ===
- Justice Warwick Andrew – Former Judge in the National and Supreme Courts. For services to the community and the judiciary.
- Kosta George Constantinou, OBE – For services to sport tourism, banking and to the community.
- Andrew Sean Trawen, CMG, MBE – Commissioner, Papua New Guinea Electoral Commission. For public service.

=== Companion of the Order of Saint Michael and Saint George (CMG) ===
- Loi Martin Bakani – Governor of the Bank of Papua New Guinea. For services to banking.
- Mao Zeming – For services to the community and to politics.

=== Knight / Dame Commander of the Order of the British Empire (KBE / DBE) ===
- Peter Ipatas, MP – For services to the community in the fields of health education and vocational training.

=== Commander of the Order of the British Empire (CBE) ===
- Anderson Agiru, MP – For services to the community and politics.
- Winnie Anna Kiap – Secretary of the National Executive Council and High commissioner to the UK. For public service.
- Michael Malabag, OBE – For services to the Electoral Commission, the Public Employees Association and to the community.
- Nicholas Mark Thompson – For services to agriculture and to the community of West New Britain Province.

=== Officer of the Order of the British Empire (OBE) ===
Civil

- Geoffrey Applegate – For services to the legal profession to mining and to trade.
- Sister Relida Gumur – For services to education and to the Catholic Church.
- Leslie Hayward – For services to air transportation and to Air Niugini.
- The Reverend Father Michael Igo – For services to leadership training and to the community.
- Dr Lawrence Kalinoe – For services to law and public administration as secretary of the Department of Justice and Attorney-General.
- William Laudin Lamur – For services to business management and to the community.
- James Miringtoro, MP – For services to national politics and to the community in Bougainville.
- Nigel Henry Parker – For services to the community and to commerce.
- Lamiller Pawut – For services to fisheries development and surveillance in the Pacific region.
- Mataio Rabura, ISO – For public service particularly in the area of immigration and citizenship.
- The Reverend Father Victor Roche – For services to the Catholic Church.
- Dr Amelia Homba Sialis, BEM – For services to the community and to health care.
- Douglas Taylor – Helicopter Pilot. For services to Aviation.
- Ellison Towallom – For national public service and services to the Bougainville Government.
- Veali Vagi – For public service and services to relations between Papua New Guinea and Malaysia.

Military

- Col John Rakatani – Papua New Guinea Defence Force

=== Member of the Order of the British Empire (MBE) ===
Civil

- Ken Andi – For services to the Lutheran Church and to Bible translation.
- Charles Apping – For services to education.
- Emmerich Arbel – For services to education.
- Carl Baga – For services to the Morobe provincial administration.
- Rava Chapman – For diplomatic and consular service.
- Charles Dama – For services to the community and to education.
- Violet Gerega – For services to education curriculum development and training.
- Kayau Gorea – For services to agriculture and to entomology.
- Wini Henao QPM – For services to the community and to the Royal Papua New Guinea Constabulary.
- Jacob Iki – For services to public administration and to the community.
- Paul Kinston Isari – For services to the community and to the Royal Papua New Guinea Constabulary.
- Reverend Zongegao Kiluwa – For services to the Evangelical Lutheran Church and to the community.
- Brother Rudi van Lier – For services to the community of Enga Province and to the Church.
- Richard Lyons – For services to the community and to education.
- Zengzeng Mari – For services to education and to the University of Goroka.
- Nellie Rebbie McLay – For services to commerce, the community, and sport.
- Nigel Paul Merrick – For services to law business and the community.
- Reverend David Odd – For services to the community to the United Church, and to youth care.
- Amaya Ola – For services to the community and to rural development.
- Mongoma Perikoma – For services to the community.
- Brian Cameron Smith – For humanitarian endeavours and for services to the community.
- John Philip Taunakekei – For services to the community and to the diplomatic service.
- Lagona Wari – For services to education and sport.
- Christopher David Wynn – For services to education and to the Anglican Church.

Military

- Lt Col John Giregire – Papua New Guinea Defence Force
- Lt Col John Manuai – Papua New Guinea Defence Force
- Cdr Philip Polewara – Papua New Guinea Defence Force
- Chief WO Peter Givere, BEM – Papua New Guinea Defence Force
- Chief WO Jonah Jogo – Papua New Guinea Defence Force
- Chief WO Tiriman James Tarutia – Papua New Guinea Defence Force
- WO Joseph Lapangas – Papua New Guinea Defence Force

=== British Empire Medal (BEM) ===
- Terry Aimai – For services to village court and to the community.
- Hannington Akena – For services to the community.
- Frank Baloiloi – For services to the Royal Papua New Guinea Constabulary.
- John Bangkok – For services to business and to the community.
- Ms Raine Bayabe – For services to rural healthcare.
- Watnabara Bortan Bunbun – For services to education.
- Supa Francis Daiworo – For services to government at local level.
- John Titus Elep – For services to the community.
- Otto Gele – For services to the community.
- Demas Rambunap Gigimat – For services to the community.
- Lumbame Haralu – For services to rural healthcare.
- Lawrence Israel – For services to the community and to the Police Force.
- Akuila Kalebo – For services to the community and to the Police Force.
- Caspar Kandamari – For services to village court.
- Josephine Kawage – For services to education.
- Ambe Kelely – For public service.
- Yuke Komba – For services to the community.
- Steven Kotene – For services to agriculture and to the community.
- John Kunda – For services to the community.
- Paul Pale Laa – For services to the community.
- David Marimbun Mingin – For services to the community.
- Tony Miria – For services to the community.
- Kua Mogia – For services to education.
- Linus Kenawi Mondi – For services to the community.
- Wane Yallo Ninzipa – For services to the community.
- Joe Oleka – For services to education.
- Samuel Alimuli Paraide – For services to education.
- Thomas Pok – For public service.
- Joel Raitano – For services to education.
- Botu Saidamu – For services to village court.
- Kang Seng – For services to the community.
- Mary Sond – For services to education.
- Logona Tai – For services to the United Church.
- Jeffery Alu Tommy – For services to the community.
- Reverend Moresby Tunge – For services to the Papua New Guinea Bible Church.
- Willy Yalindogu – For services to village court.

== Solomon Islands ==
=== Officer of the Order of the British Empire (OBE) ===
Civil

- Bishop Richard Basil Naramana. For services to education, religion, commerce and business, the community and social development.

=== Member of the Order of the British Empire (MBE) ===
Civil

- Stephen Firibae. For services to the Royal Solomon Islands Police Force and to community development.
- Walter Folotalu. For services to national security, politics, the Church and to community development.
- Emmanuel Kouhata. For services to policing, immigration, integrity institutions and to the judiciary.
- Moddie, Mrs. Nanau. For services to broadcasting and to the community.
- Moses Ramo. For services to community empowerment and service development in the area of human rights.
- The Right Reverend Nathan Tome. For services to aviation, education, the Church, and to community development.

=== British Empire Medal (BEM) ===
Civil

- Alfred Devesi Bouro. For services to education, the Church, and to community development.
- Ishmael Kaipulu. For services to the Church and to community development.
- Ms Annie Margaret Kiriau. For services to commerce and business, and to raising awareness of violence against women.
- Ms Doreen Kuper. For services to commerce and business, diplomacy, culture, community and to social development.
- The Reverend Walter Devi Manerau. For services to education, the Church, to sport and to community development.
- Eric Taraihaka. For services to health care in the area of Malaria Control in Malaita Province.

== Tuvalu ==
=== Knight Commander of the Order of the British Empire (KBE) ===
Civil

- Dr. Iftikhar Ahmad Ayaz, O.B.E. For services to Tuvalu.

== Saint Lucia ==
=== Commander of the Order of the British Empire (CBE) ===
Civil

- Stephen David Rupert McNamara. For public service, and services to the legal profession.

=== Officer of the Order of the British Empire (OBE) ===
Civil

- Theophilus Ferguson John. For services to the community and the country.
- Father Thomas Raymond Laurent. For services to the Church, the community and the country.

=== Member of the Order of the British Empire (MBE) ===
Civil

- Pastor Wulstan Charles. For services to the community and to the Church.
- Reginald Dominic Cherebin. For services to the community. *George Deterville. For public service.
- Joseph Rameau Poleon, Outstanding Folklorist and Musician.

=== British Empire Medal (BEM) ===
Civil

- Cyril Felix. For services to the community and to the art of Calypso. Joseph Grames Jean. For services to education.
- Rufina Jennifer, Mrs. Cooper-Jn Baptiste. For services to the community and the public.
- Frederick Jongue. For services to education and to the community.
- Eustace Carol Tertullien. For services to education and to the community.

== Belize ==
=== Member of the Order of the British Empire (MBE) ===
Civil

- Delhart Luthrel Courtney, Senior. For services to sport and to the community.
- Jose Victor Moreno, Senior. For services to music.
- Norberta, Mrs. Pulido. For services to the community.

== See also ==
- 2015 Queen's Birthday Honours (Australia)
- New Zealand Royal Honours System
- Orders, decorations, and medals of the United Kingdom
