= Mercy Odondo =

- Born: Nyanza region
- Occupations: Human Rights defender, Social Worker, Actress

Academic background
- Education: Social work and development
- Alma mater: Equitas International Centre for Human Rights Education

Academic work
- Discipline: Sociologist
- Sub-discipline: Human rights
- Notable works: Kenya Annual Human Rights Debate, Mercy Odondo Unplugged

Mercy Odondo is a Kenyan human rights defender, social worker, and actress known for her advocacy against sexual and gender-based violence (SGBV). She is the founding director of Gender Dialogues Kenya, an initiative that uses theater, community debates, and dialogue to promote human rights and sexual and reproductive health. Odondo is also the founder of the Kenya Annual Human Rights Debate and the Mercy Odondo Unplugged platform, both of which focus on civic engagement and community awareness.

== Early life and education ==
Odondo is a Kenyan human rights defender, actress, trainer, and social worker. She was born and grew up in the Nyanza Region in Kenya. She attended Nyamira Girls High School, then pursued studies in mass communication and public relations at Nairobi Aviation College, with a focus on community awareness. She later obtained a diploma in social work and community development from Kisumu National Polytechnic, which she completed between 2010 and 2012.

Odondo has also undertaken professional training in human rights and leadership. Odondo is an alumna of the Equitas International Centre for Human Rights Education International Human Rights Training Program (2016). In addition, she is a fellow of the Young African Leaders Initiative (YALI) Regional Leadership Center East Africa (2020), where she received training in leadership and civic engagement.

== Career ==
Odondo is the founding director of Gender Dialogues Kenya. This initiative utilizes theatre, debates, and community dialogues to address sexual and gender-based violence (SGBV), particularly among adolescent girls and young women. She also founded the Kenya Annual Human Rights Debate and Mercy Odondo Unplugged, which serve as platforms for civic engagement and human rights advocacy. In addition, she works as a trainer-of-trainers to support community-based capacity-building initiatives.

Her work focuses on using art-based approaches, including theatre and dialogue forums, to advocate against SGBV and to promote sexual and reproductive health and rights.

This work has led to collaborations with several national and international organizations, including Plan International, Amnesty International Kenya, the United Nations Population Fund (UNFPA), and the Office of the United Nations High Commissioner for Human Rights (OHCHR). During the COVID-19 pandemic, Odondo participated in outreach initiatives providing information, support services, and dignity kits to over 2,000 adolescent girls and young women. In 2021, she was featured in the "Women in Leadership, achieving an equal future in a COVID-19 world" campaign, a joint initiative by the African Union, UN Women, UNFPA, UNICEF, UNHCR, and OHCHR.

Odondo has been featured in various media and advocacy projects, including Amnesty International Kenya's Brave Campaign, the Hear My Voice campaign led by OHCHR, and episode nine of the One Vibe Africa documentary series, Made in Kisumu. For her community work, she received the 2018 Safe Space Champion of the Year Award and the Golden Women Award.

Odondo’s work is influenced by the environmentalist and activist Wangari Maathai, reflecting a shared commitment to social justice and sustainable community development.

== Advocacy and impact ==
Odondo’s advocacy centers on ending sexual and gender-based violence, as well as addressing period stigma and menstrual poverty. Through her initiatives, she conducts community training, facilitates dialogues, and documents cases related to gender-based violence. She has also used social media platforms to raise awareness and mobilize communities around issues affecting adolescent girls and young women in Kisumu County and beyond.

Her work emphasizes the creation of safe spaces for vulnerable populations and highlights structural challenges in reporting and responding to abuse, especially in marginalized and rural communities. She has also used social media platforms to raise awareness and mobilize communities around issues affecting women and girls.

During crisis periods such as the COVID-19 pandemic, Odondo mobilized networks and resources to support adolescent girls and young women with essential supplies, including sanitary products and hygiene items. Her initiatives promote community engagement, access to information, and the empowerment of girls and women to make informed decisions regarding their health and well-being.

== Awards and recognition ==
- Safe Space Champion of the Year Award (2018).
- Golden Women Awards (2019).
- Community and Human Rights Award at the Apostles Hayford Alile Humanitarian Awards.
