= Education in the Enlightenment =

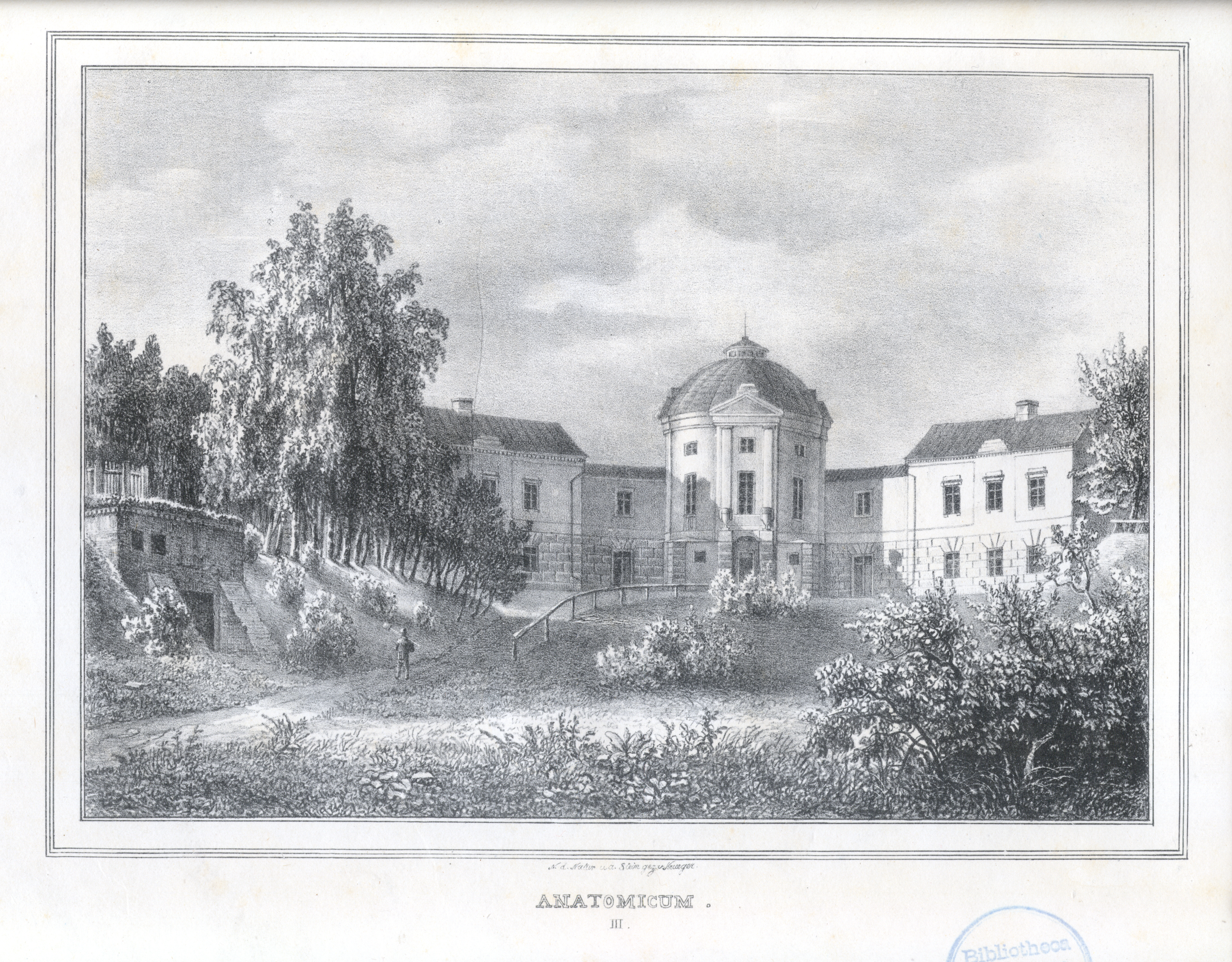
Universities in northern Europe were more willing to accept the ideas of the Enlightenment and were often greatly influenced by them. For instance, the historical ensemble of the University of Tartu in Estonia, that was erected around that time, is now included in the European Heritage Label list as an example of a university in the Age of Enlightenment.

The Age of Enlightenment dominated advanced thought in Europe from about the 1650s to the 1780s. It developed from a number of sources of “new” ideas, such as challenges to the dogma and authority the Catholic Church and by increasing interest in the ideas of science, in scientific methods. In philosophy, it called into question traditional ways of thinking. The Enlightenment thinkers wanted the educational system to be modernized and play a more central role in the transmission of those ideas and ideals. The development of educational systems in Europe continued throughout the period of the Enlightenment and into the French Revolution. The improvements in the educational systems produced a larger reading public which resulted in increased demand for printed material from readers across a broader span of social classes with a wider range of interests. After 1800, as the Enlightenment gave way to Romanticism, there was less emphasis on reason and challenge to authority and more support for emerging nationalism and compulsory school attendance.

== History of education ==
Before the Enlightenment, European educational systems were principally geared for teaching a limited number of professions, e.g., religious orders such as priests, brothers, and sisters, health care workers such as physicians, and bureaucrats such as lawyers and scribes, and they were not yet greatly influenced by the Scientific Revolution. As the scientific revolution and religious upheaval broke traditional views and ways of thinking of that time, religion and superstition were supplanted by reasoning and scientific facts. Philosophers such as John Locke proposed the idea that knowledge is obtained through sensation and reflection. This proposition led to Locke's theory that everyone has the same capacity of sensation, and, therefore, education should not be restricted to a certain class or gender. Prior to the 17th and 18th centuries, education and literacy were generally restricted to males who belonged to the nobility and the mercantile and professional classes. In England and France, “idealized notions of domesticity, which emphasized the importance of preparing girls for motherhood and home duties, fuelled the expansion of schooling for girls.”

== Educational ideas ==
John Locke in English and Jean Jacques Rousseau in French authored influential works on education. Both emphasized the importance of shaping young minds early. By the late Enlightenment, there was a rising demand for a more universal approach to education, particularly after the American and French Revolutions.

Enlightenment children were taught to memorize facts through oral and graphical methods that originated during the Renaissance. The predominant educational psychology from the 1750s onward, especially in northern European countries was associationism; the notion that the mind associates or dissociates ideas through repeated routines. It offered a practical theory of the mind that allowed teachers to transform longstanding forms of print and manuscript culture into effective graphic tools of learning for the lower and middle orders of society.

Many of the leading universities associated with Enlightenment progressive principles were located in northern Europe, with the most renowned being the universities of Leiden, Göttingen, Halle, Montpellier, Uppsala, Glasgow and Edinburgh. the faculty and graduates of these universities, especially Glasgow and Edinburgh, centres of the Scottish Enlightenment, had a significant impact on Britain's North American colonies and, later, the American Republic. Glasgow led the way, in moral philosophy, notably with Francis Hutcheson, Adam Smith, and Thomas Reid.

However, in general the universities and schools of France and most of Europe were bastions of traditionalism and were not hospitable to the Enlightenment. In France the major exception was the medical university at Montpellier.

== Growth of the education system ==
=== Literacy ===
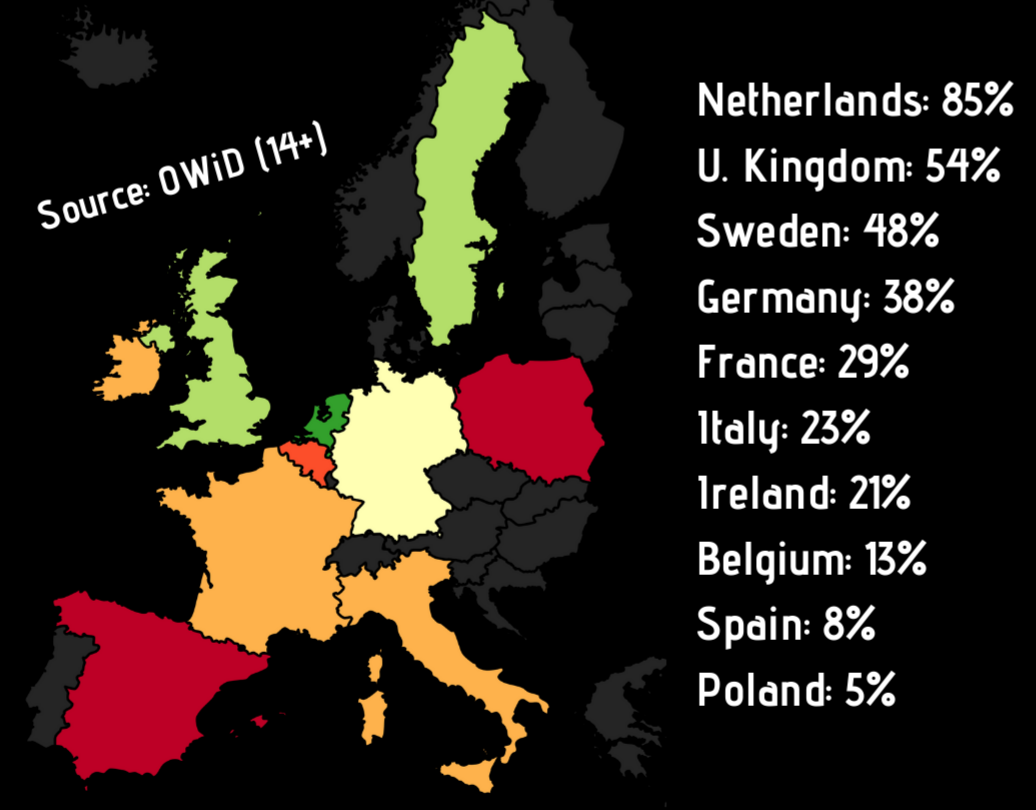
Literacy rate in Europe (1750)

Education was once considered a privilege for only the upper class. However, during the 17th and 18th centuries, “education, literacy and learning” were gradually provided to “rich and poor alike”. The literacy rate in Europe from the 17th century to the 18th century grew significantly. The definition of the term "literacy" in the 17th and 18th centuries is different from our current definition of literacy. Historians measured the literacy rate during the 17th and 18th century centuries by people's ability to sign their names. However, this method of determining literacy did not reflect people's ability to read. This affected the women's apparent literacy rate prior to the Age of Enlightenment mainly because, while most women living between the so-called Dark Ages and the Age of Enlightenment could not write or sign their names, many could read, at least to some extent.

The rate of illiteracy decreased more rapidly in more populated areas and areas where there was mixture of religious schools. The literacy rate in England in the 1640s was around 30 percent for males, rising to 60 percent in the mid-18th century. In France, the rate of literacy in 1686-90 was around 29 percent for men and 14 percent for women, before it increased to 48 percent for men and 27 percent for women.

The increase in literacy rate was more likely due, at least in part, to religious influence, since most of the schools and colleges were organized by clergy, missionaries, or other religious organizations. The reason that motivated religions to help to increase the literacy rate among the general public was that the Bible was being printed in more languages and literacy was thought to be the key to understanding the word of God. “By 1714 the proportion of women able to read had risen, very approximately, to 25%, and it rose again to 40% by 1750. This increase was part of a general trend, fostered by the Reformation emphasis on reading the Scripture and by the demand for literacy in an increasingly mercantile society. The group most affected was the growing professional and commercial class, and writing and arithmetic schools emerged to provide the training their sons required”. The impact of the Reformation on literacy was, of course, far more dramatic in Protestant areas. Therefore, literacy rates in predominantly Protestant Northern Europe rose much more quickly than those in predominately Catholic southern Europe. The Jesuits, who were the product of the Catholic Counter Reformation contributed moderately to increased literacy in Catholic regions.

=== Prussian system ===
The Kingdom of Prussia introduced a modern public educational system designed to reach the entire population; it was widely copied across Europe and the United States in the 19th century. The basic foundations of the Prussian primary education system were laid out by Frederick the Great with his "Generallandschulreglement," a decree of 1763, drafted by Johann Julius Hecker. It mandated the schooling of all young Prussians, both girls and boys, to be educated by mainly municipality funded schools from age 5 until age 13 or 14. Prussia was among the first countries in the world to introduce a tax-funded and generally compulsory primary education. In comparison, compulsory schooling in France or Great Britain was not successfully enacted until the 1880s.

The Prussian system consisted of an eight-year course of primary education, called Volksschule. It provided not only basic technical skills needed in a modernizing world (as reading and writing), but also music (singing), religious (Christian) education in close cooperation with the churches and tried to impose a strict ethos of duty, soberness and discipline. Mathematic and calculus were not compulsory in the start and taking such courses was requiring additional payment by parents. Frederick the Great also formalized further educational stages, such as the Realschule and the highest stage, the gymnasium (state funded secondary school), which was used as university-preparatory school. The final examination, Abitur, was introduced in 1788, implemented in all Prussian secondary schools by 1812, and extended to all of Germany in 1871 and is in place till the present. Passing the Abitur was a pre-requisite to entering the learned professions and higher echelons of civil service. Generations of Prussian and as well German teachers, which in the 18th century often had no formal education and in the very beginning often were former petty officers without pedagogic training, tried to gain more academic recognition, training and better pay and played an important role in various protest and reform movements.

The Prussian system, after its modest beginnings, succeeded in reaching compulsory attendance, specific training for teachers, national testing for all students (of all genders), national curriculum set for each grade and mandatory Kindergarten. In 1810, Prussia introduced state certification requirements for teachers, which significantly raised the standard of teaching.

In the 18th century, states were paying more attention to their educational systems because they recognized that their subjects are more useful to the state if they are well educated. The conflicts between the crown and the church helped the expansion of the educational systems. In the eyes of the church and the state, universities and colleges were institutions that existed to maintain the dominance of one over the other. The downside of this conflict was that the freedom of thought on the subjects taught in these institutions was restricted. An educational institution was either a supporter of the monarchy or the religion, never both.

Also, changes in educational criteria for higher income professions such as lawyers and physicians became stricter, e.g., requirements to have certain educational experience before being licensed, helped to promote increases in the numbers of students attending universities and colleges.

== Print culture ==
The explosion of the print culture, which started in the 15th century with Johannes Gutenberg's printing press, was both a result of and a cause of the increase in literacy. The number of books published in the period of the Enlightenment increased dramatically due to the increase in demand for books, which resulted from the increased literacy rates and the declining cost and easier availability of books made possible by the printing press. There was a shift in the percentages of books printed in various categories during the 17th century.

Religious books had comprised around 50% of all books published in Paris at that time. However, the percentage of religious books dropped to 10% by 1790 and there was an increase in the popularity of books such as almanacs. The scientific literature in French might have increased slightly but mostly it remained fairly constant throughout the 18th century. However, contemporary literature seems to have increased as the century progressed. Also, there was a change in the languages that books were printed in. Before the 18th century, a large percentage of the books were published in Latin. As time progressed, there was a decline in the percentage of books published in Latin. Concurrently, the percentage of books published in French, and other languages, increased throughout Europe.

Of course the importance of print culture to education is not simply about counting publication figures. Students had to use the books that were given to them and they had to use pen and paper to organise and make sense of the information that they were learning. In this sense print culture was closely tied to manuscript culture, particularly the skills and routines associated with note-taking. Perhaps one of the most notable accomplishments of Enlightenment educational systems is that they taught students how to efficiently manage information on paper, both in school and then in university.

== Public libraries ==
During the Enlightenment period, there were changes in the public cultural institutions, such as libraries and museums. The system of public libraries was a product of the Enlightenment. The public libraries were funded by the state and were accessible to everyone for free.

Prior to the Enlightenment, libraries in Europe were restricted mostly to academies and the private collections of aristocrats and other wealthy individuals. With the beginning of state funded institutions, public libraries became places where the general public could study topics of interest and educate themselves. During the 18th century, the prices of books were generally too high for the average person, especially the most popular works such as encyclopedias. Therefore, the public libraries offered commoners a chance of reading literature and other works that previously could only be read by the wealthier classes.

== Intellectual exchange ==
During the 18th century, the increase in social gathering places such as coffeehouses, clubs, academies and Masonic Lodges provided alternative places where people could read, learn and exchange ideas. In England, coffeehouses became public spaces where political, philosophical and scientific ideas were being discussed. The first coffeehouse in Britain was established in Oxford in 1650 and the number of coffeehouses expanded around Oxford.

The coffeehouse was a place for people to congregate, to read, to learn and to debate with each other. Another name for the coffeehouse is the Penny University, because the coffeehouse had a reputation as a place of informal learning. “The popularization of new ideas encouraged further changes in the habits and beliefs of many ordinary people. Reading clubs and coffeehouses allowed many urban artisans and businessmen to discuss the latest reform ideas.” Even though the coffeehouses were generally accessible, most of them did not allow women as customers. Clubs, academies, and Lodges, although not entirely open to the public, established venues of intellectual exchange that functioned as de facto institutions of education.

== Education of girls and women ==
During the 17th century, there were a number of schools dedicated to girls, but the cultural norm was for girls to be informally educated at home. During the 18th century, there was an increase in the number of girls being educated in schools. This was especially true for middle-class families whose rising financial status and social aspirations made providing an aristocratic style of education for their daughters both desirable and possible.

In France, one of the most famous schools for girls was the Saint-Cyr, which was founded by Madame de Maintenon. Although the school Saint-Cyr was meant to educate women, it did not dare to challenge the traditional views towards women. Women were excluded from learning subjects such as science and politics. In October, 1795, France created “a National Institute and Normal Schools that excluded women from the professional study of Philosophy.” In Louise d'Épinay's, recollection of her childhood education, she pointed out that girls were not taught much of anything and that a proper education was considered to be inappropriate for the female sex.

Among the earliest published works to challenge notions of women of being the weaker intellectual sex was Francois Poulain de la Barre's De regalite des deux sexes (On the Equality of the Sexes) in 1673 in which he proclaimed "the mind has no sex". John Locke and d'Épinay, were to follow in arguing that women's apparent weakness and lack of accomplishment was due to debilitating expectations and poor education. It was a theme taken up by Germany's first woman medical doctor Dorothea Christiane Erxleben who wrote a Thorough Investigation of the Causes which Prevent the Female Sex from Studying (1742).

Locke's child-centred pedagogical theories are said to have "set the terms by which education was debated in eighteenth century Ireland", including for girls. In the 1760s, a primary exemplar of an enlightened approach to co-education was David Manson's self-styled "play school" in Belfast. In Manson's school, which has also been seen as foreshadowing some of the experiments usually ascribed to the new school of educationalists inspired by Rousseau, "young ladies received the same extensive education as the young gentlemen". They moved together in equal rank through the common play and academic hierarchy: queens alongside kings, duchesses alongside dukes, and ladies alongside lords, and both girls and boys attended a Saturday parliament.

Such practices were broadly consistent with the pedagogy later proposed by Mary Wollstonecraft. Her Vindication of the Rights of Woman, published in London in 1792 and Dublin in 1793, and in Dublin in 1793, was translated almost immediately in French and was printed in the United States. Like Rousseau she thought education should be based on espousing and exploring the natural abilities of a person, but protested his suggestion that this required women's education to be differentiated and tailored to a pre-emptive responsibility for care giving. Women's undoubted caring abilities, she argued, could only be enhanced, morally and intellectually, by securing girls equal education opportunities and not least in the skills of logical reasoning and abstract thinking through mastery of such subjects as mathematics, science, history, literature, and language.

Catherine the Great of Russia was a patron of women's education in Russia throughout the 18th century. Heeding to the advice of Ivan Betskoy, an educational reformer and close adviser, the Empress created separate boarding schools for both boys and girls. The Smolny Institute for Noble Girls in 1764 became the first higher learning institute for women in Europe, an institution that Catherine helped establish; the following year the Queen of Russia established the Novodevichii Institute, an all-female institute for the daughters of Russian commoners. Just as Frederick the Great oversaw the establishment of compulsory education in Prussia, Catherine contributed to the evolution of women's education on the continent and enabled for the further modernization of the Russian state during the Enlightenment.
