= Documentaries presented by Zara McDermott =

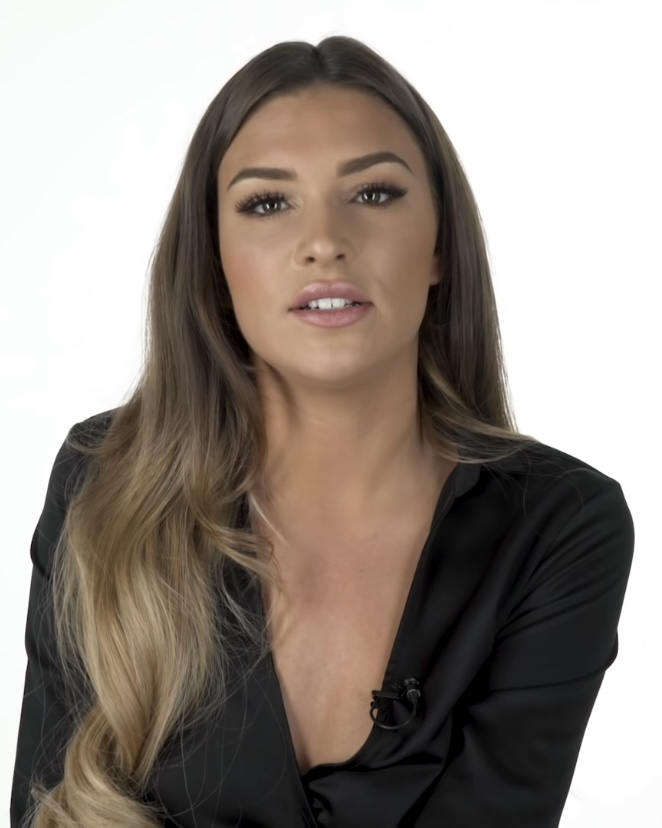
McDermott has fronted four documentaries, as of 2023.

English media personality Zara McDermott has presented six documentaries for the BBC. Whilst appearing on the fourth series of Love Island in 2018, her nude photos were shared without her consent, marking the second time it had happened to her. This became the background of her first documentary, Revenge Porn, which premiered in 2021. McDermott admitted that she had felt like the least successful person from her series of Love Island and wanted to take an unconventional approach to success. After departing from Made in Chelsea, she explained that she wanted to move on from short-term brand deals and reality television to continue making documentaries.

== Revenge Porn ==
Whilst appearing on the fourth series of Love Island in 2018, nude photos of McDermott were shared around the internet without her consent. This marked the second time it had happened to her, the first being when she was in school. She was emotional after being eliminated from Love Island and was further upset to learn of the nudes being shared. Two years later, she was contracted by BBC to make a documentary based around her experience, as well as other victims of revenge porn. They greenlit Zara McDermott: Revenge Porn and it was announced in February 2021. It was billed as an informative documentary where she would discuss sexting and her experiences of revenge porn with fellow victims. McDermott emphasised that she would not shame anybody for sending nude pictures in the film.

Professional ratings
Review scores
Source	Rating
Evening Standard	4/5 stars
i newspaper	4/5 stars

In the documentary, McDermott opened up about her school life. She revealed that at 14, she was bullied, lonely, not eating or sleeping properly. Days before her nude photos were leaked, she felt "worn down" and was in a constant state of depression that she could not lift. She sent a nude photo to a boy at school that she wanted to like her, but he shared the photo to numerous friends without her consent. She knew that the images would make the bullying worse and began to contemplate suicide. A similar incident happened seven years later at the age of 21, whilst she was on Love Island. The suicidal thoughts returned and she was angered not only by the men who had shared the images, but by the victim blaming she encountered. McDermott found that people tend to focus on her having sent images to someone, rather than the pictures being shared without her consent.

After the documentary's premiere, McDermott began receiving messages from over 10 women a day, telling her about their individual experiences with revenge porn and praising her film. The Evening Standard praised McDermott's presenting skills, billing her as "an engaging and deeply empathetic presenter who does not shy away from grey areas". They opined that the documentary should be shown in schools and gave it four out of five stars. i newspaper described it as a "powerful and uncompromising documentary that centred its subjects and afforded them the dignity they had been denied". They found that it "engaged with nuance" around the social issue and appreciated that it explored people's idea that some victims are more deserving of sympathy than others. They were impressed by McDermott's ability to connect with victims and to openly share her story, as well as billing her as brave for trying to contact the men who had leaked her nudes. Although i felt that the film should have covered more scrutiny of the judicial process and how rare a conviction is, they hoped that people of all ages should watch the documentary, not just generation Z.

== Uncovering Rape Culture ==
Professional ratings
Review scores
Source	Rating
The Independent	4/5 stars
i newspaper	4/5 stars

McDermott's second documentary, Zara McDermott: Uncovering Rape Culture, delved into rape culture in the United Kingdom. She was inspired to make the documentary after she was sexually assaulted in 2017. She recalled being aged 21 and getting followed by a teenage boy in a park. He threatened that he would rape her, pushed her up against a fence and tries to pull her leggings down, before a group of people gathered and he ran away. She thought the boy, who was never found by the police, was 15, and hence made it her goal to visit schools and talk about rape culture with students.

Uncovering Rape Culture premiered on BBC in November 2021. She kept hearing about the impact of pornography on rape culture and therefore decided to contact Pornhub about why they allow children to access their content. Unable to get through on the phone, she turned up at the headquarters of MindGeek, the company that owns Pornhub, and was dismissed from the premises after trying to gain access. The Independent hailed her as a "compassionate interviewer" in scenes where she talked with and comforts schoolgirls affected by rape culture. They went on to describe her as "intrepid" for holding Pornhub accountable for their damage. They rated the documentary four out of five stars. i newspaper rated it the same. They commended her for beginning a conversation about the topic and hoped that it would have an impact, as well as highlighting the scenes where she tried to enter MindGeek's premises, billing it "her own Louis Theroux moment".

== Disordered Eating ==
McDermott's third documentary film, Zara McDermott: Disordered Eating, focused on the rise of eating disorders (EDs) in young people throughout the early 2020s. It premiered on BBC in November 2022. In the documentary, she talks about the trolling about her body that she received from Love Island viewers. The comments had inspired McDermott to lose weight and to begin an exercise and healthy eating journey, which she documented on her Instagram. However, after the lifestyle change, McDermott was being told that she was promoting unhealthy body standards. She came up with the idea for the documentary and set out to discover if her social media, amongst other influencers, had negatively impacted others' mental health and relationship with food in the documentary.

Professional ratings
Review scores
Source	Rating
i newspaper	3/5 stars

For the film, McDermott met with numerous young people suffering from eating disorders. She asked them about the connection between social media and their disorder, as well as querying if they felt she had caused people to suffer from an ED. The Courier, an online journal written by Newcastle students, wondered if McDermott was the right person to be taking on such a documentary. They wrote that while her aim to shed light on the dark side of social media was admirable, giving influencers such as McDermott more public attention could do more harm than good. McDermott, however, felt that it was important for influencers to take accountability and to use their voice. She stated: "I've made sensitive films before, and I continue to make sensitive films as it's something I've learned, especially in the last year, about being reflective and being able to look within and be introspective. Often, I think, especially in this industry, there's such a need to be perfect all the time and that’s hard. I understand why, because you never want to be criticised to actually say 'I don't know this and I want to learn', and I think that's just something that I've realised over the last few years is that it's fine to not know and to explore, and it is really where the difference can happen."

Women's Health praised the film for showcasing both top eating disorder clinicians and Beat, a British charity for EDs. They also appreciated that it highlighted a racial bias within the public perception of EDs, since it covered how sufferers from non-white ethnic backgrounds can go unnoticed by doctors. The magazine found the documentary in general to be "deeply affecting" but felt that the documentary did not match the seriousness of the "crisis" that EDs are. The New Statesman were unimpressed with the documentary and thought that it was hypocritical for an influencer to present it, but noted that McDermott was broaching a worthy topic.

== Gaia: A Death on Dancing Ledge ==
Professional ratings
Review scores
Source	Rating
The Times	3/5 stars
i newspaper	4/5 stars
The Guardian	4/5 stars

McDermott's fourth documentary saw her take a break from social issues to delve into the disappearance of Gaia Pope. Pope was a British teenager who went missing in November 2017, aged 19. Her body was found 11 days later. It marked the first documentary by McDermott that spanned across multiple episodes, with the BBC ordering three parts. Of the series, she thought it was "important to tell a story of tragedy" and hoped that it captured emotion for viewers. The documentary's name was derived from Dancing Ledge in Dorset, which is where Pope's body was found. Gaia: A Death on Dancing Ledge premiered in July 2023.

The Guardian writer Lucy Mangan found the documentary to be "a humane, meaningful look" at Pope's death. She found that the interviews with Pope's families and friends were "delicately interwoven" and appreciated the in-depth analysis into why she disappeared. i newspaper journalist Ed Power appreciated McDermott's take on the documentary. He reckoned that if Netflix were to cover Pope's story, it would be "piled high with cliff-hangers and padded out to the point where it was both repulsive and dull". Power was therefore thankful that McDermott had presented it before they had a chance to, since she had a "hugely compassionate" approach.

== Ibiza: Secrets of the Party Island ==
The BBC announced McDermott's fifth documentary, Ibiza: Secrets of the Party Island, in July 2023, when she began filming the series. On the four-part documentary, she stated: "I’ll be discovering what makes Ibiza tick and finding out what the future might hold for this ever changing island. As the 'Instagram effect' makes Ibiza the place to be seen for more and more young Brits I’m keen to explore how the island operates and deals with the challenges this poses." She first visited Ibiza in 2019 and enjoyed it enough to go back several times; McDermott then wanted to understand the phenomenon of the island and how it looks to attract a more upmarket clientele.

This marked McDermott's first international documentary project. Clare Sillery, head of commissioning in BBC's documentary department, said. "Zara's popularity is down to her ability to speak at eye level to the BBC Three audience about what matters most to them, so we're thrilled she'll be bringing that insight to Ibiza for us." It premiered on 21 April 2024.

== The Idaho Murders: Trial by TikTok ==
McDermott's sixth documentary for BBC three heads for the University of Idaho, where four students were murdered in November 2022. Internet sleuths started digging for information, posting their theories online. Eventually, police were forced to publicly respond to the social media rumours to try and stop the harassment of individuals who had been targeted by the true crime community. Zara McDermott tries to find out how much of what she saw online was even real, and how much was pure speculation.
