= Nicki Chapman =

English television and radio presenter (born 1967)

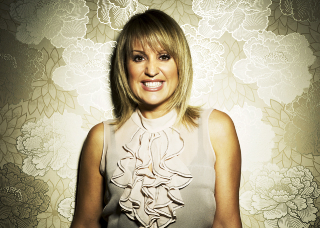
- Chapman in 2008, by Steve Schofield
- Born: Nicola Chapman; 14 January 1967 (age 59); Herne Bay, Kent, England
- Occupations: Television & radio presenter; reality TV judge; PR agent
- Years active: 1988–present
- Spouse: Dave Shackleton (m. 1999)
- Website: nickichapman.com

Nicki Chapman (born 14 January 1967) is an English television and radio presenter, talent show judge and public relations agent who previously worked in the British pop music industry.

Chapman was a judge on the ITV reality shows Popstars, with Nigel Lythgoe and Paul Adam, and Pop Idol, along with Simon Cowell, Pete Waterman and Neil Fox. She currently hosts Wanted Down Under, Escape to the Country and its spin-offs I Escaped to the Country and Escape to the Continent, as well as The RHS Chelsea Flower Show. She currently appears on Magic Radio as presenter of the weekday evening show.

== Early life ==
Chapman was born in Herne Bay in Kent on 14 January 1967. Her mother was a housewife and her father worked for Rank Xerox.

Chapman went to St Anselm's Catholic School, Canterbury.

== Career ==
Chapman worked her way up in the music industry from being Promotions Assistant at MCA records at the age of 21. She later worked at RCA as Head of Promotions where she first met Simon Cowell. She applied for the promotions job and the next day, called and said: "I need to know if you want me, I've been offered another job, but this is the one I really want."

Up until the end of 2000, she was a joint partner in the Brilliant! PR company with Nick Godwyn. They managed Billie Piper and Amy Winehouse as well as representing, among others, the Spice Girls, Kylie Minogue, Charlotte Church, Take That, David Bowie, Van Morrison and Phil Collins as well as the PR for the Brit Awards and The Big Breakfast. Having met and worked with Simon Fuller in the 1990s she joined his management company 19 Entertainment in January 2001 as Creative Director, working with acts including Annie Lennox, Will Young, S Club 7 and the Spice Girls.

Chapman rose to fame as a judge on the ITV television series Popstars and Pop Idol, together with Nigel Lythgoe and Paul Adam (on Popstars), Simon Cowell, Pete Waterman and Neil Fox (on Pop Idol). Pop Idol was the top rated TV show in the UK for 2001 and 2003 making Chapman a household name. Chapman was known in particular for her compassionate nature towards contestants on the shows, in contrast to many talent shows of the present day. She once claimed that "What I think and what I say have to be different because people don't need to hear my honest thoughts, you can let them down a lot more gently and it takes a lot of courage to stand up there and do an audition."

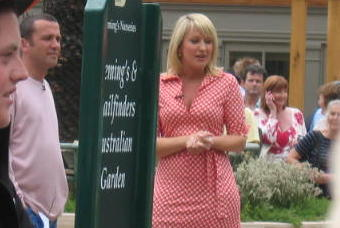
Nicki Chapman at the Chelsea Flower Show in 2008

She currently works as a presenter and has fronted a number of lifestyle and current affairs programmes for the BBC and ITV including Holiday, BBC Breakfast News, Holidays at Home, The Morning Show, Sunday Style, RHS Chelsea Flower Show, Castle in the Country, Escape to the Sun, City Hospital, Holiday Ten Best and others. She presented a series for Sky One called Made in LA which investigated behind the scenes of the rich and famous.

In 2006, Chapman was one of twelve celebrities in the BBC's Sport Relief showjumping programme Only Fools on Horses. Despite being a novice, and suffering a shoulder injury as a result of falling from her horse during one of the live broadcasts, she came second, voted by the public.

In May 2007, Chapman co-hosted the live ITV1 celebrity cookery show Soapstar Superchef (the spin off from Soapstar Superstar).

In October 2008, Chapman joined her fellow ex-Pop Idol judges Pete Waterman and Neil Fox on Peter Kay's Britain's Got the Pop Factor... and Possibly a New Celebrity Jesus Christ Soapstar Superstar Strictly on Ice, a spoof on the talent show genre of programmes.

In 2009, she appeared as a judge in Disney Channel's Hannah-Oke along with Disney's Brad Kavanagh and Dancing on Ice judge Jason Gardiner.

In 2011, as well as filming another series of Escape to the Country and Wanted Down Under, she was heard on BBC Radio 2 sitting in for Vanessa Feltz on the Early Breakfast Show, which she continued to do until Vanessa left the station in 2022. She also deputised for Janice Long in 2012, Anneka Rice in 2013 and Sara Cox in 2019. Since 2019, she has also deputised for Zoe Ball on the Breakfast Show. In early 2021, she presented The Saturday Show between Graham Norton leaving the station and Claudia Winkleman taking over the slot. In 2024, it was announced she would temporarily host 'Sunday Love Songs', following the death of the long time presenter Steve Wright.

In November 2014, Chapman hosted The Imperial Dream by the Spanish Riding School of Vienna at the Wembley Arena.

In January 2012, Chapman appeared on The Talent Show Story, a documentary for ITV about various entertainment and talent shows. She spoke about her time on Pop Idol and Popstars, as well as working with Nigel Lythgoe and Simon Cowell. The show featured interviews from various talent show judges and stars including Kelly Rowland, Dannii Minogue, Amanda Holden, Piers Morgan, Lenny Henry and Les Dennis as well as her former co-judges Pete Waterman and Neil Fox.

In November 2024, it was announced that Chapman had joined Magic Radio to present the station's evening show Mellow Magic, Monday to Thursdays only.

== Personal life ==
Chapman is married to Dave Shackleton, a music producer and Sony BMG executive; the couple live in Chiswick, London.

In May 2019 she revealed she had surgery to remove a non-cancerous brain tumour and later made a good recovery. Subsequently, she was appointed an Ambassador for The Brain Tumour Charity. In 2022, Chapman made this comment during an interview: "It's important for me to work with The Brain Tumour Charity and share my experience to help others know that they're not alone in this."

She is an ambassador for British Dressage and a supporter of Teenage Cancer Trust, Childline and Nordoff–Robbins music therapy as well as volunteering for Save the Children in her spare time.
