= Laura Anderson =

Scottish television personality (born 1989)

- Born: 23 April 1989 (age 37); Stirling, Scotland, UK
- Occupation: Television personality
- Television: Love Island; Celebrity Karaoke Club; Celebs Go Dating
- Children: 1

Laura Anderson (born 23 April 1989) is a Scottish television and radio personality. In 2018, she was the runner-up on the fourth series of Love Island. In 2022, she was a finalist on Celebrity Karaoke Club and also appeared on Celebs Go Dating. In April 2024, Laura was announced as the new co-host of Capital Breakfast on Capital Scotland, alongside Fat Brestovci.

== Life and career ==
Anderson was born on 23 April 1989 in Stirling, Scotland to Barbara and David Anderson. Prior to appearing on television, she was an air hostess working for the airline Emirates. In 2018, Anderson became a contestant on the fourth series of Love Island. Throughout the series she was coupled up with Wes Nelson, Jack Fowler and Paul Knops, the latter of whom she reached the final with and finished as the runners-up, behind winners Dani Dyer and Jack Fincham. From 2019 to 2020, she presented the podcast Laura Anderson's First. In each episode, she spoke to people about their challenging experiences. In 2022, she was a contestant on the third series of Celebrity Karaoke Club. She joined the club on the first day and reached the final after surviving the bottom two twice. Anderson was previously in a relationship with Another Level singer Dane Bowers and resided with him in Dubai. Following their split in August 2022, Anderson signed up to appear on the eleventh series of Celebs Go Dating that same month and started a relationship with former Hollyoaks and Footballers' Wives actor, Gary Lucy. In February 2023, Anderson announced her pregnancy with Lucy, while at the same time announcing the couple's separation. Lucy was present at the birth of their daughter in September 2023, but Anderson refused to comment on whether the two had reconciled, and asked fans not to pry.

In April 2024, Laura was announced as the new co-host of Capital Breakfast on Capital Scotland, alongside Fat Brestovci, but quit just ten months later to prioritise her family and was replaced by Robyn Richford.

== Filmography ==
As herself
Year	Title	Notes	Ref.
2018	Love Island	Contestant; series 4 runner-up	
2022	Celebrity Karaoke Club	Contestant; series 3 finalist	
2022	Celebs Go Dating	Main cast; series 11	
