= Zara McDermott =

English media personality (born 1996)

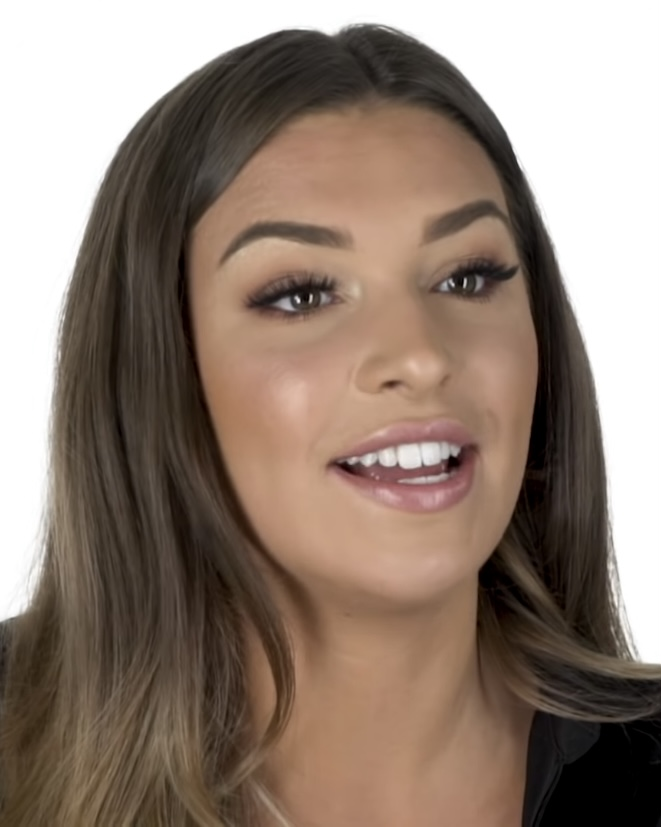
- McDermott in 2019
- Born: Zara Nicole McDermott; 14 December 1996 (age 29); Havering, London, England
- Occupations: Television personality; model; singer; television presenter
- Years active: 2009–present
- Employer: BBC
- Notable work: List of documentaries
- Television: Love Island; The X Factor: Celebrity; Made in Chelsea; Strictly Come Dancing

Zara Nicole McDermott (born 14 December 1996) is an English reality television personality. After working for the Department for Education as a policy advisor, she became a contestant on the fourth series of Love Island (2018) and subsequently appeared on The X Factor: Celebrity (2019) and Made in Chelsea (2019–2020).

McDermott has gone on to present her own BBC documentaries, including: Revenge Porn (2021), Uncovering Rape Culture (2021) and Disordered Eating (2022) based on her own experiences, as well as Gaia: A Death on Dancing Ledge (2023), The Idaho Murders: Trial by TikTok (2024), Inside Ibiza (2024) and Thailand: The Dark Side of Paradise (2025). In 2022, she presented the dating series Love in the Flesh on BBC Three and a year later, she competed on the twenty-first series of Strictly Come Dancing.

== Early and personal life ==
Zara Nicole McDermott was born on 14 December 1996 in the London Borough of Havering, England, to Alan and Karen McDermott. In 2009, she appeared with her parents and younger brother, Brad, on the BBC television series Wanted Down Under, during which the family considered emigrating to Australia. They returned to the programme in 2013 for Wanted Down Under: Revisited, where they discussed their decision to remain in the United Kingdom.

At the age of 14, McDermott was suspended from secondary school after sending nude photographs to a boy. During her time on Love Island, further nude photographs of her were leaked online; she addressed both incidents in her BBC documentary Revenge Porn.

Before her television career, McDermott worked for the Department for Education as a policy advisor. She has identified as a Conservative and voted to leave the European Union in the 2016 Brexit referendum.

In May 2019, McDermott began a relationship with television personality Sam Thompson. They separated briefly after she admitted to cheating on him, later reconciling in late 2020, before separating again in 2024. In early 2025, she began dating singer-songwriter Louis Tomlinson.

== Career ==
=== 2018–2020: reality television ===
In June 2018, McDermott became a contestant on the fourth series of Love Island. She entered the villa as a "bombshell" contestant on Day 15 and coupled up with Adam Collard, before being dumped from the villa ten days later. In October 2019, McDermott took part in The X Factor: Celebrity as part of No Love Lost, a group which featured her Love Island co-stars Eyal Booker, Samira Mighty and Wes Nelson. They were mentored by Louis Walsh and finished in eighth place. The same month, McDermott began appearing as a cast member on the E4 reality series Made in Chelsea, alongside Thompson. She made her last appearance on the show in December 2020.

=== 2021–present: documentaries and Strictly Come Dancing ===
McDermott admitted that she had felt like the least successful person from her series of Love Island and wanted to take an unconventional approach to success. After departing from Made in Chelsea, she explained that she wanted to move on from short-term brand deals and reality television to focus on making documentaries. In February 2021, McDermott appeared in her own BBC documentary, Zara McDermott: Revenge Porn, which saw her recall the experience of having her nude photos leaked as a teenager. She later appeared in a follow-up documentary, Zara McDermott: Uncovering Rape Culture, in November, which saw McDermott draw on her own experience of almost being raped. In March 2022, McDermott presented the dating series Love in the Flesh on BBC Three. The premise of the show featured couples who had only ever spoken online, meeting in person for the first time. In November 2022, she fronted a further documentary, Zara McDermott: Disordered Eating.

In July 2023, McDermott presented the documentary Gaia: A Death on Dancing Ledge, based on the disappearance and death of teenager Gaia Pope-Sutherland. A month later, she was announced as a contestant on the twenty-first series of Strictly Come Dancing. She became the first Love Island cast member to be cast on the series. McDermott was paired with Graziano Di Prima and they were the fifth couple to be eliminated Halloween Week. In 2024, she presented for the BBC The Idaho Murders: Trial by TikTok, where she heads to the small town of Moscow, Idaho to find out about the global online manhunt that followed four tragic murders. Also in 2024, she is set to present a four-part documentary series for the BBC titled Ibiza: Secrets of the Party Island.

In 2024, McDermott was commissioned by the BBC to present Stalked, a factual series that will be exploring the impact of stalking in a new series. She will be meeting and spending time with those currently being subjected to this behaviour, witnessing how stalking affects everyday lives and following the process when victims report to police and navigate the justice system.

In 2025, McDermott presented BBC's Thailand: The Dark Side of Paradise, which was widely criticized for an inaccurate portrayal of the country. The documentary featured interviews with influencers including Mike Yu, a young British expat living a "life of luxury" in Bangkok. McDermott's team was nearly arrested for filming locations in Bangkok.

McDermott started podcasting in 2026 with an interview series titled Truth Be Told and a wellness podcast titled Feel Good Formula. She co-hosts the latter with nutritionist Emily Prpa.

== Filmography ==
As herself
| Year | Title | Role | Ref. |
|---|---|---|---|
| 2009 | Wanted Down Under | Participant; 1 episode | |
| 2013 | Wanted Down Under: Revisited | Participant; 1 episode | |
| 2018 | Love Island | Contestant; series 4 | |
| 2018 | Politics Live | Guest; 1 episode | |
| 2018 | Panorama | Guest; 1 episode | |
| 2019–2020 | Made in Chelsea | Cast member | |
| 2019 | The X Factor: Celebrity | Contestant | |
| 2021 | Revenge Porn | Presenter | |
| 2021 | Uncovering Rape Culture | Presenter | |
| 2022 | Love in the Flesh | Presenter | |
| 2022 | Disordered Eating | Presenter | |
| 2023 | Gaia: A Death on Dancing Ledge | Presenter | |
| 2023 | Strictly Come Dancing | Contestant; series 21 | |
| 2024 | Ibiza: Secrets of the Party Island | Presenter | |
| 2024 | The Idaho Murders: Trial by Tiktok | Presenter | |
| 2025 | To Catch a Stalker | Presenter | |
| 2025 | Thailand: The Dark Side of Paradise | Presenter | |
| 2026 | Cooking with the Stars | Contestant; Season 6 | |

== Awards and nominations ==
| Year | Award | Category | Nominated work | Result | Ref. |
|---|---|---|---|---|---|
| 2022 | National Television Awards | Authored Documentary | Zara McDermott: Uncovering Rape Culture | Nominated | |
