= Samira Mighty =

English television personality and actress

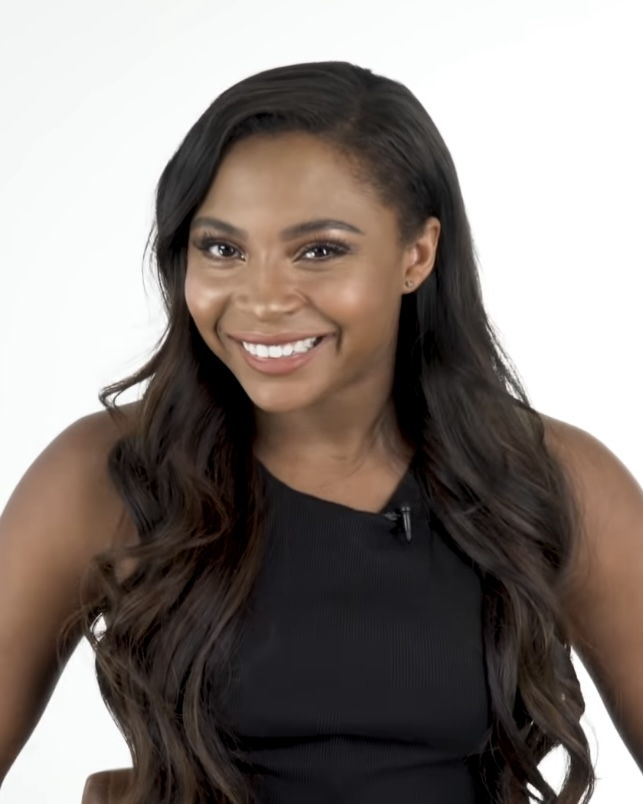
- Mighty in 2019
- Born: 16 November 1995 (age 30); Greenwich, England
- Occupations: Television personality; actress; singer
- Years active: 2017–present
- Television: Love Island'
- Musical career
- Genres: House; pop
- Instrument: Vocals

Samira Jade Mighty (born 16 November 1995) is an English television personality, actress and singer. Mighty began her career with appearances in West End theatre shows including Mamma Mia! and Dreamgirls, as well as an appearance in the 2017 film Beauty and the Beast. In 2018, she appeared in the fourth series of the ITV2 reality series Love Island, and has since competed on The X Factor: Celebrity. In 2022, Mighty began releasing music.

== Early life ==
Samira Jade Mighty was born on 16 November 1995 in Greenwich. As a child, Mighty attended the Young Dancers Academy in West London. She also trained at the Millennium Performing Arts College in Woolwich for three years, where she became trained in jazz, ballet, contemporary, tap and commercial dance styles, as well as singing and acting.

== Career ==
Mighty began her career as a West End theatre performer, making appearances in Mamma Mia!, The Nutcracker and Dreamgirls. As well as her stage credits, she appeared in the 2017 film Beauty and the Beast. In 2018, Mighty departed from her role as an ensemble member from Dreamgirls in order to appear on the fourth series of Love Island. Her abrupt departure from Dreamgirls led to reports that she was being sued by the production company of the show, but Mighty later confirmed that her role was "easy to fill" since she was in the ensemble, and that an ex-cast member had filled the role. She later walked from the series. Months after her exit from Love Island, Mighty was announced as the host of the Facebook Watch game show, Confetti.

In 2019, it was announced that Mighty would be competing in the ITV competition series The X Factor: Celebrity. In the celebrity series, she was part of a group called No Love Lost, alongside fellow Love Island cast members Zara McDermott, Eyal Booker and Wes Nelson; Mighty acted as the lead singer of the group. After being eliminated after the third live show, Mighty confirmed that she had left the group, and that she was working on her own music. In July 2022, she released her debut single, a cover of "I Love Your Smile". She has also confirmed that more music would be released following the song.

== Personal life ==
Mighty has revealed that she was in a relationship with Chris Pine shortly before appearing on Love Island. During the latter show she was briefly coupled as friends with Alex George and also had a relationship with Frankie Foster whom she would end up leaving the island after he was eliminated. They split short after. As of 2026 she lives in London, England

== Filmography ==
Year	Title	Role	Notes
2017	Beauty and the Beast	Debutante	Film
2018	Love Island	Herself	Contestant
2018	Love Island: Aftersun	Herself	Guest
2025	Bambi: The Reckoning	Harriet	
2026	Orphan	Monica	Short film

== Discography ==
=== Extended plays ===
List of EPs, with selected details
Title	Details
Dancefloor & Drama - Vol 1.	Released: 19 January 2024; Label: Nightmoves

=== Singles ===
List of singles as lead artist, showing year released and originating album
Year	Title	Album
"I Love Your Smile" (with W.D.C)	2022	Non Album Singles
"Like This, Like That"	2023	Dancefloor & Drama - Vol 1.
"That's Not What My Friends Say"	2023	Dancefloor & Drama - Vol 1.
"Envy Me"	2023	Dancefloor & Drama - Vol 1.
"Toxic"	2023	Dancefloor & Drama - Vol 1.
"Good at Goodbyes"	2023	Dancefloor & Drama - Vol 1.
“Where my Girls At?”	2024	Non Album Singles
“See Through You”	2024	Non Album Singles
“Valentines Day”	2025	Non Album Singles
“Missing”	2025	Non Album Singles
“Cardio”	2025	Non Album Singles
“Kiss”	2026	Non Album Singles
“No Scrube”	2026	Non Album Singles
“Me n U”	2026	Non Album Singles
“Sorry”	2026	Non Album Singles
