= Eyal Booker =

English media personality (born 1995)

- Born: Eyal Adi Booker; 2 August 1995 (age 31); Watford, Hertfordshire, England
- Education: Jewish Free School; Sylvia Young Theatre School
- Occupations: Television personality; model; singer
- Years active: 2016–present
- Television: Love Island; Celebs on the Ranch; Celebs Go Dating; The X Factor: Celebrity

Eyal Adi Booker (born 2 August 1995) is an English media personality. Whilst attending the Sylvia Young Theatre School, he was selected as a member of the music group EverYoung. Then in 2018, he was a contestant on the fourth series of Love Island. Booker later went on to appear on Celebs on the Ranch and Celebs Go Dating, as well as The X Factor: Celebrity as part of the group No Love Lost.

== Life and career ==
Eyal Adi Booker was born on 2 August 1995 in Watford, Hertfordshire and raised in Bushey. Booker is Jewish and attended the Jewish Free School in Kenton, London. He later attended the Sylvia Young Theatre School, where he became a member of EverYoung, a band formed by Sylvia Young. Booker, alongside fellow students Cherelle Williams, Hollie McKinlay and Jack Morlen were signed by Young's record label Seymore Place Music as part of an 18-month apprenticeship. In 2016, he appeared in one of the music videos for Zara Larsson's song "Lush Life". Booker later began working as a model and a social media influencer, and has appeared in fashion campaigns and worked for brands including Adidas, Puma and Bed Head.

In 2018, Booker became a contestant on the fourth series of Love Island. He entered the villa on Day 1 and was dumped on Day 25. After leaving the series, he made guest appearances on Love Island: Aftersun, The Wright Stuff and The Big Narstie Show. In October 2018, Booker appeared on the fifth series of Celebs Go Dating. In March 2019, Booker appeared on the second series of the game show Impossible Celebrities on BBC One. In April 2019, Booker took part in the 5Star reality series Celebs on the Ranch, where he was the fourth celebrity to be eliminated. He also appeared on MTV Cribs UK. In October 2019, he took part in The X Factor: Celebrity as part of No Love Lost, a group consisting of Booker and his former Love Island co-stars Zara McDermott, Samira Mighty and Wes Nelson. They were eliminated from the show in week 3 and the group disbanded shortly afterwards. In 2021, Booker appeared in two episodes of The Real Housewives of Beverly Hills, alongside his then-girlfriend Delilah Belle Hamlin, the daughter of cast member Lisa Rinna. In 2022, he appeared as a guest on the ITV2 game shows CelebAbility and Apocalypse Wow.

== Filmography ==
As himself
Year	Title	Notes	Ref.
2018	Love Island	Contestant; series 4	
2018	Love Island: Aftersun	Guest; 1 episode	
2018	Celebs Go Dating	Cast member	
2019	Impossible Celebrities	Contestant; 6 episodes	
2019	Celebs on the Ranch	Contestant	
2019	MTV Cribs UK	Homeowner; 1 episode	
2019	The X Factor: Celebrity	Contestant	
2021	The Real Housewives of Beverly Hills	Guest; 2 episodes	
2022	CelebAbility	Guest; 1 episode	
2022	Apocalypse Wow	Participant	
2023	Love Island Games	Participant; season 1	
2025	Love Island USA	Aftersun Guest Host, 1 episode	
2026	Unwell Winter Games	Contestant; 4 episodes	
