= Holidays at Home =

British reality TV series

Holidays at Home is a 2005 program released by the BBC. The short-lived first series featured six episodes before it ceased production.

== Show overview ==
Presenter Nicki Chapman went on trips with the families. Each was driven around for a while then back to their house.

After getting them out of the car, she would tell them that they would be having a Holiday at Home. She would present them with a clue about what they would be doing the next day. Each night every person did a video diary about that day.

Each one had a different BBC production team, but Tony was the same chauffeur for all the families.

== Episodes ==
- The Atherton Family Mon 5 September
- Steph Ledigo & Vicky O'Donnell Mon 12 September
- The Dixon / Aldridge Family of eight Mon 19 September Filmed in July. Sun Snowsports / Mon & Tue Canal Boat / Diggerland, Kent / Offroad Driving Experience / Garden Pool and Jacuzzi.
- Carol Stafford & Donna Dickenson Mon 26 September
- Vicki & George 3 October. Longleat/The Gower/Referee training/Circus Skills/The Pudding Club
- The Atwood Family Sept 10 October
