= The X Factor: Celebrity =

2019 celebrity edition of The X Factor

- Hosted by: Dermot O'Leary (ITV)
- Judges: Simon Cowell; Louis Walsh; Nicole Scherzinger
- Winner: Megan McKenna
- Winning mentor: Louis Walsh
- Runner-up: Max and Harvey
- No. of episodes: 8

Release
- Original network: ITV; YouTube (Xtra Bites)
- Original release: 12 October – 30 November 2019

The X Factor: Celebrity is a British celebrity special edition of The X Factor which premiered on 12 October 2019 on ITV. It is a revamped version of the 2006 celebrity format The X Factor: Battle of the Stars. Simon Cowell, Nicole Scherzinger and Louis Walsh judged this series, with Dermot O'Leary presenting the series and Vick Hope hosting Xtra Bites on YouTube.

The format for the series was announced in 2019, after The X Factor was contracted until 2020. The celebrity lineup was announced on 30 September 2019. On 30 November, Megan McKenna won the series with 46.3% of the vote, with Max and Harvey finishing in second place and Jenny Ryan in third place.

== Background and judges ==
The X Factor: Celebrity judges

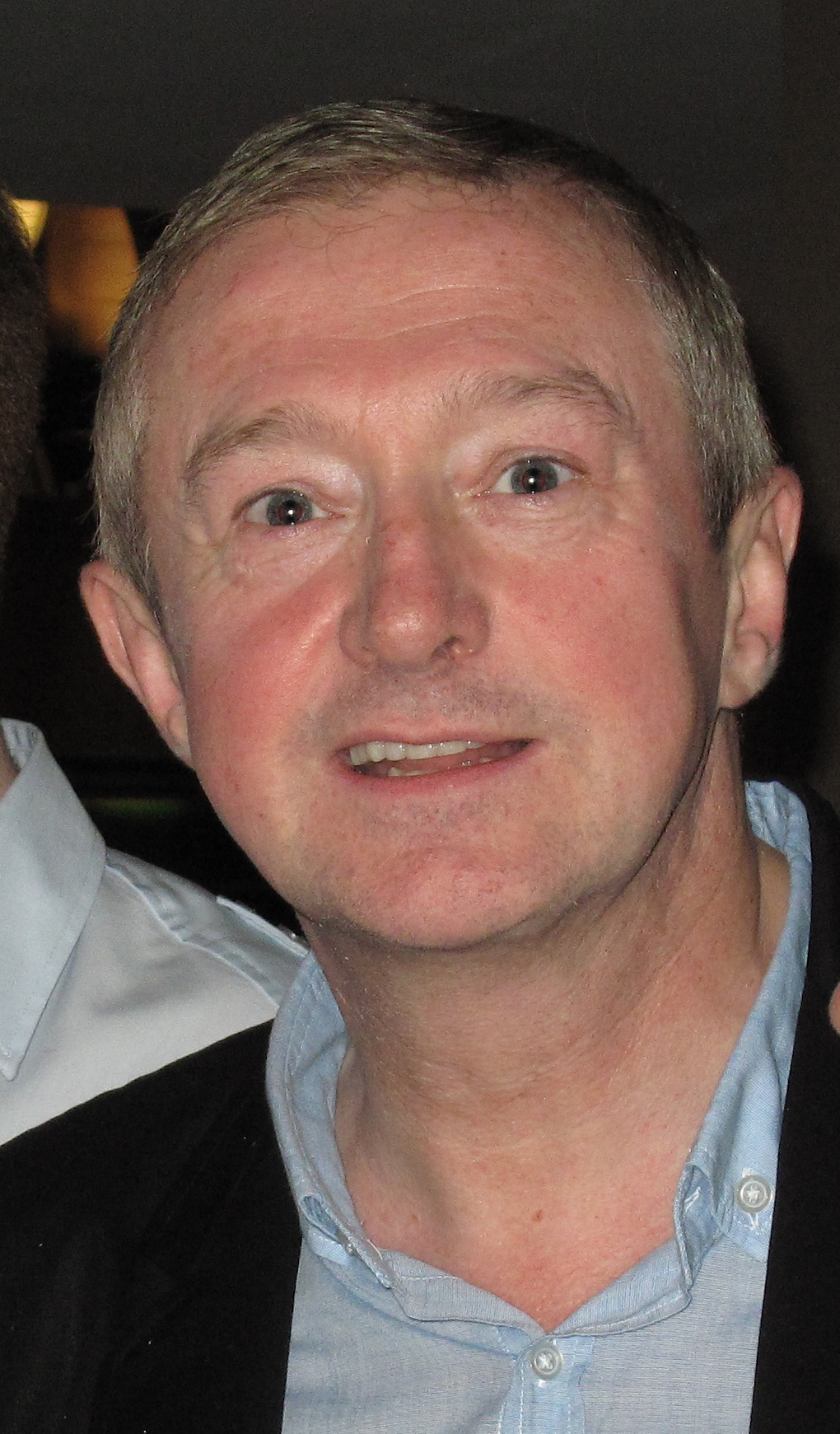
Louis Walsh

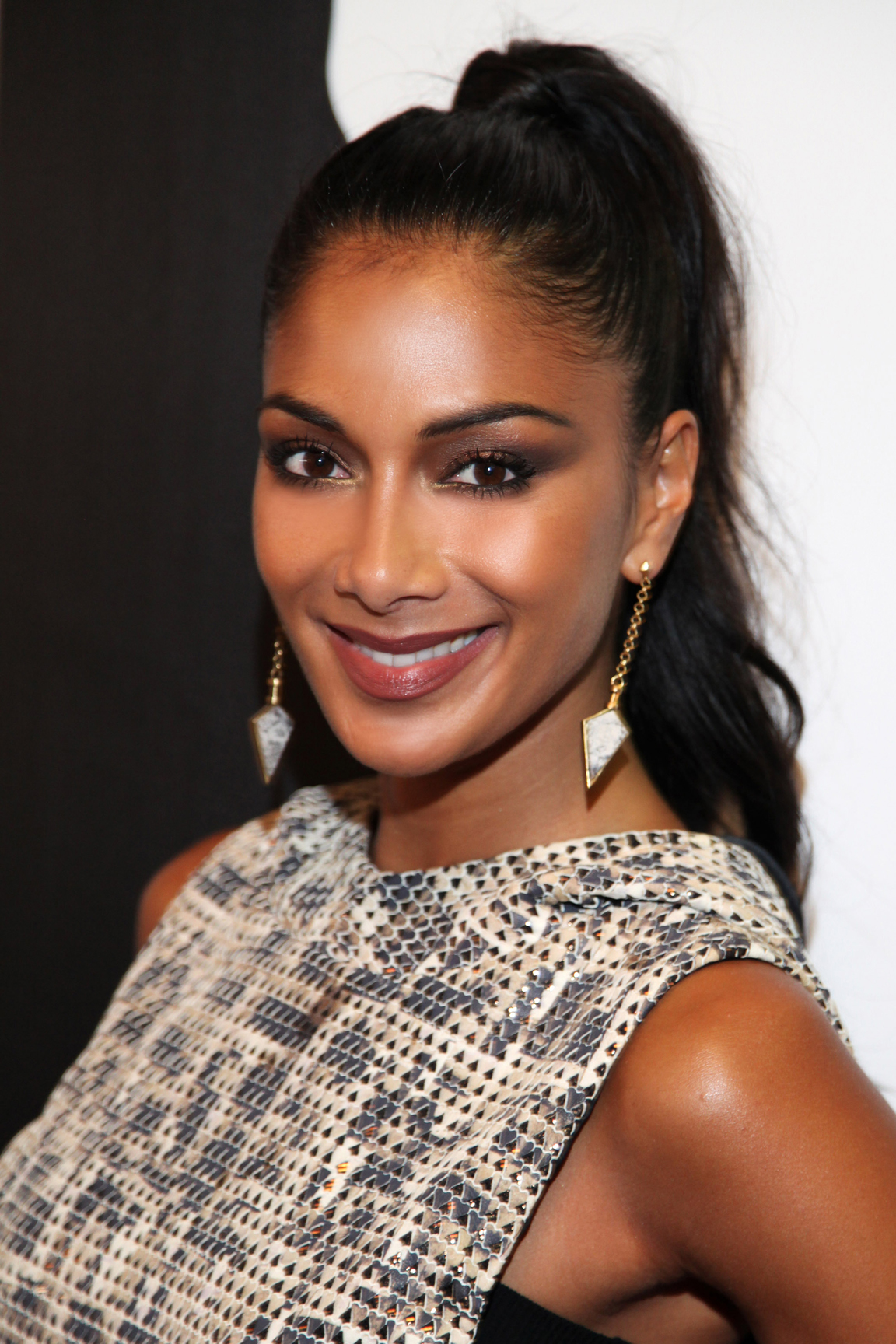
Nicole Scherzinger

Simon Cowell

The series' predecessor, The X Factor: Battle of the Stars aired in 2006 as a celebrity incarnation of The X Factor. It was reported on 26 August 2006 that Cowell had axed Battle of the Stars, describing it as "pointless" and adding "we are never going to do it again." However, Cowell later stated in an interview with The Sun on 30 November 2018 that he would consider reviving the show for a second series as a charity special.

The series was first reported in early 2019, as the main series was being put on hiatus due to declining ratings. On 7 July 2019, Walsh spoke about the return of the series, stating, "I go to Los Angeles on Tuesday, I go to Simon's house in Malibu, it's me, Simon and Nicole, we're doing the celebrity one." On 22 October 2019, it was revealed that Vick Hope would host Xtra Bites on YouTube, each episode premiered after each live show.

The format of the series differs heavily than Battle of the Stars to bring it more in line with the main series. Notable differences between this series and Battle of the Stars are instead of competing for charity, the acts are competing to win a record contract with Syco Music, and the live shows, instead of being aired daily, are aired every Saturday night, allowing more time inbetween shows for the acts to develop their artistry.

== Acts ==
A teaser, released in September 2019, teased the potential contestants of the series, of which include: a film star, model, online influencers, professional dancer, social media stars and a soap star. The full line-up was revealed on 30 September 2019. Cowell mentored the Groups, Walsh mentored the 16-30s and Scherzinger mentored the Over 31s. During auditions, Cowell's America's Got Talent co-judge Howie Mandel and American Idol co-judge Randy Jackson appeared as guest judges.

Key:

– Winner
– Runner-up
– Third place
– Fourth place
– Eliminated in the Live shows
– Eliminated in the Auditions

Act	Age(s)	Hometown	Category (Mentor)	Known For	Result
Megan McKenna	27	Barking, England	16-30s (Walsh)	Television personality	Winner
Max and Harvey	16	Sandhurst, England	Groups (Cowell)	YouTube personalities	Runner-up
Jenny Ryan (Note: Ryan was originally eliminated in the Auditions, but on 21 October 2019, she was brought back into the competition.)	37	Bolton, England	Over 31s (Scherzinger)	Quizzer & The Chase star	3rd place
V5 (Note: V5 consists of social media influencers Laura Buitrago, Alondra Martinez, Sofia Oliveira, Wendii Sarmiento, and Renata Vaca. Vaca replaced Natalie Valerin, who left before the live shows.)	18–21	Colombia / Puerto Rico / Brazil / Cuba / Mexico	Groups (Cowell)	Social media influencers	4th place
Try Star (Note: Try Star consists of Levi Davis, Thom Evans and Ben Foden.)	21–34	Birmingham / Harare, Zimbabwe / Chester	Groups (Cowell)	Rugby union players	5th place
Vinnie Jones (Note: Jones did not audition for the series due to the death of his wife, but Cowell invited him to join the live shows.)	54	Watford, England	Over 31s (Scherzinger)	Actor & former Premier League footballer	6th place
Kevin McHale	31	Plano, Texas, U.S.	16-30s (Walsh)	Glee actor	7th place
No Love Lost (Note: No Love Lost (previously known as Love Islanders) consist of stars Eyal Booker, Zara McDermott, Samira Mighty and Wes Nelson.)	21–24	Essex / London / Staffordshire	Groups (Cowell)	Love Island stars	8th place
Martin Bashir	56	Wandsworth, England	Over 31s (Scherzinger)	Journalist & news anchor	9th place
Jonny Labey	26	Grouville, Jersey	16-30s (Walsh)	Former EastEnders actor	10th place
Victoria Ekanoye	36	Bury, England	Over 31s (Scherzinger)	Former Coronation Street actress	11th place
Olivia Olson	27	Los Angeles, California, U.S.	16-30s (Walsh)	Actress & singer	12th place
Ricki Lake	51	Hastings-on-Hudson, New York, U.S.	Over 31s (Scherzinger)	Hairspray actress & former talk show host	13th place
Hayley Hasselhoff	27	Los Angeles, California, U.S.	16-30s (Walsh)	Actress & model	Eliminated
Cole and Edwards (Note: Cole and Edwards consists of Brendan Cole and Jeremy Edwards.)	43 & 48	Christchurch, New Zealand (Cole); London, England (Edwards)	Groups (Cowell)	Former Strictly Come Dancing professional (Cole); Former Hollyoaks actor (Edwards)	Eliminated

== Auditions ==
The audition process took place in Los Angeles, California. The celebrity acts were all asked to meet with O'Leary in a location where they then spent two days with the production team working on vocal training and song choices. They then auditioned for Cowell, Walsh and Scherzinger at a house party in Malibu consisting of various singers, songwriters, record producers and talent judges for the acts to perform in front of.

Some of the guest judges that the celebrities got to perform in front of were as follows:

- Tricky Stewart
- Diane Warren
- David Foster
- Pete Waterman O.B.E.
- Sinitta
- Dallas Austin
- J.C. Chasez
- Victoria Monét
- Randy Jackson
- Howie Mandel
- JoJo
- Michelle Visage

Vinnie Jones, who was due to take part in the show, was unable to fly to Los Angeles for his audition due to the death of his wife Tanya Terry on 6 July 2019. Cowell personally called Jones two months later and offered him an unconditional place in the live shows.

Order	Celebrity	Category	Song choice	Result
Week 1 (12 October 2019)
1	No Love Lost (Note: Love Islanders changed their name to No Love Lost before live shows.)	Groups	"There's Nothing Holdin' Me Back"	Advanced
2	Kevin McHale	16-30s	"Never Be the Same"	Advanced
3	Max and Harvey	Groups	"I Don't Care"	Advanced
3	Max and Harvey	Groups	"Sucker"	Advanced
4	Cole & Edwards	Groups	"Love at First Sight"	Eliminated
5	Martin Bashir	Over 31s	"L-O-V-E"	Advanced
6	Hayley Hasselhoff	16-30s	"Someone You Loved"	Eliminated
7	Jenny Ryan	Over 31s	"Somebody to Love"	Advanced (Note: Ryan was originally eliminated in the Auditions, but on 21 October 2019, she was brought back into the competition.)
8	Try Star	Groups	"No Diggity"	Advanced
Week 2 (19 October 2019)
1	Olivia Olson	16-30s	"Location"	Advanced
1	Olivia Olson	16-30s	"Come Together"	Advanced
2	Jonny Labey	16-30s	"Feel It Still"	Advanced
2	Jonny Labey	16-30s	"Feeling Good" with David Foster	Advanced
3	Megan McKenna	16-30s	"Everything but You"	Advanced
4	Ricki Lake	Over 31s	"Us"	Advanced
5	V5	Groups	"Juice"	Advanced
6	Victoria Ekanoye	Over 31s	"The House of the Rising Sun"	Advanced

== Live shows ==
=== Results summary ===
Colour key

–	Act was eliminated by their mentor
–	Act was in the bottom three but received the fewest votes and was immediately eliminated
–	Act received the fewest public votes and was immediately eliminated (no sing-off)
–	Act received the most public votes
–	Act was given a Safe Seat from the judges

Weekly results per act
Act	Auditions	Week 1	Week 2	Week 3	Quarter-Final	Semi-Final	Final	
Act	Auditions	Week 1	Week 2	Week 3	Quarter-Final	Semi-Final	First Vote	Second Vote
Megan McKenna	Advanced	1st 26.7%	1st 30.1%	1st 25.7%	1st 21.6%	1st 28.6%	1st 40.6%	Winner; 46.3%^{4}
Max and Harvey	Advanced	5th 10.6%	3rd 12.2%	Safe; Seat	4th 14.0%	3rd 16.9%	2nd 27.5%	Runner-Up; 27.1%^{4}
Jenny Ryan	Eliminated^{1}	Safe; Seat	5th 10.4%	2nd 25.5%	3rd 14.5%	2nd 17.2%	3rd 21.2%	3rd 22.4%^{4}
V5	Advanced	6th 8.7%	4th 12.0%	5th 11.0%	5th 10.5%	5th 11.1%	4th 10.7%	Eliminated (final)
Try Star	Advanced	Safe; Seat	Safe; Seat	3rd 17.5%	2nd 20.8%	4th 15.7%	Eliminated (semi-final)	
Vinnie Jones	Advanced	2nd 16.5%	2nd 14.0%	Safe; Seat	6th 10.1%	6th 10.5%	Eliminated (semi-final)	
Kevin McHale	Advanced	7th 7.9%	Safe; Seat	Safe; Seat	7th 8.5%	Eliminated (quarter-final)		
No Love Lost	Advanced	3rd 11.2%	Safe; Seat	4th 13.7%	Eliminated (week 3)			
Martin Bashir	Advanced	8th 3.7%	6th 9.3%	6th 6.6%	Eliminated (week 3)			
Jonny Labey	Advanced	Safe; Seat	7th 6.6%	Eliminated (week 2)				
Victoria Ekanoye	Advanced	4th 10.7%	8th 5.4%	Eliminated (week 2)				
Olivia Olson	Advanced	9th 2.9%	Eliminated (week 1)					
Ricki Lake	Advanced	10th 1.1%	Eliminated (week 1)					
Hayley Hasselhoff	Eliminated	Eliminated (Auditions)						
Cole & Edwards	Eliminated	Eliminated (Auditions)						
Sing-off	N/A	Bashir, Olson	Bashir, Labey	No Love Lost, V5	Jones, McHale	Try Star, V5	No sing-off or judges' votes: results were based on public votes alone	
Walsh's vote to eliminate (16-30s)	Hasselhoff	Bashir	Bashir	No Love Lost	Jones	—N/a^{3}	No sing-off or judges' votes: results were based on public votes alone	
Scherzinger's vote to eliminate (Over 31s)	Ryan	Olson	Labey	No Love Lost	McHale	Try Star	No sing-off or judges' votes: results were based on public votes alone	
Cowell's vote to eliminate (Groups)	Cole & Edwards	Olson	None (abstained)	—N/a^{2}	McHale	Try Star	No sing-off or judges' votes: results were based on public votes alone	
Eliminated	Cole & Edwards by Cowell	Ricki Lake; 1.1% to save	Victoria Ekanoye; 5.4% to save	Martin Bashir; 6.6% to save	Kevin McHale; 2 of 3 votes Majority	Vinnie Jones; 10.5% to save	V5; 10.7% to save	Jenny Ryan; 22.4% to win
Eliminated	Hayley Hasselhoff by Walsh	Olivia Olson; 2 of 3 votes Majority	Jonny Labey; 1 of 2 votes Deadlock	No Love Lost; 2 of 2 votes Majority	Kevin McHale; 2 of 3 votes Majority	Try Star; 2 of 2 votes Majority	V5; 10.7% to save	Max and Harvey; 27.1% to win
Eliminated	Jenny Ryan by Scherzinger	Olivia Olson; 2 of 3 votes Majority	Jonny Labey; 1 of 2 votes Deadlock	No Love Lost; 2 of 2 votes Majority	Kevin McHale; 2 of 3 votes Majority	Try Star; 2 of 2 votes Majority	V5; 10.7% to save	Max and Harvey; 27.1% to win

- ^1 Although Ryan was eliminated by Scherzinger, Ryan later returned as the thirteenth finalist.
- ^2 Cowell was not required to vote as there was already a majority.
- ^3 Walsh was not required to vote as there was already a majority.
- ^4 The voting percentages in the final's second vote do not add up to 100%, owing to the freezing of votes. V5 received 4.2% of the final vote.

=== Week 1 (26 October) ===
- Theme: Express Yourself

Acts' performances on the first live show
Act	Category (mentor)	Order	Song (original artist)	Result
Kevin McHale	16-30s (Walsh)	1	"Good as Hell" (Lizzo)	Safe
Ricki Lake	Over 31s (Scherzinger)	2	"Landslide" (Fleetwood Mac)	Eliminated (Fewest Public Votes)
No Love Lost	Groups (Cowell)	3	"All or Nothing" (original song)	Safe
Jenny Ryan	Over 31s (Scherzinger)	4	"Rise Like a Phoenix" (Conchita Wurst)	Saved by Scherzinger
Jonny Labey	16-30s (Walsh)	5	"Show Me Love" (Robin S.)	Saved by Walsh
V5	Groups (Cowell)	6	"Bad Guy"/"Taki Taki" (Billie Eilish) / (DJ Snake)	Safe
Martin Bashir	Over 31s (Scherzinger)	7	"Danke Schoen" (Wayne Newton)	Bottom Three
Max and Harvey	Groups (Cowell)	8	"When Will I Be Famous?" (Bros)	Safe
Olivia Olson	16-30s (Walsh)	9	"Anyone Who Had a Heart" (Dionne Warwick)	Eliminated (Judges' Vote)
Vinnie Jones	Over 31s (Scherzinger)	10	"Everybody Needs Somebody to Love" (Solomon Burke)	Safe
Megan McKenna	16-30s (Walsh)	11	"This" (original song)	Safe (Highest Votes)
Victoria Ekanoye	Over 31s (Scherzinger)	12	"Never Tear Us Apart" (INXS)	Safe
Try Star	Groups (Cowell)	13	"Pony"/"Old Town Road" (Ginuwine) / (Lil Nas X)	Saved by Cowell

Judges' votes to eliminate

- Walsh: Martin Bashir - backed his own act, Olivia Olson.
- Scherzinger: Olivia Olson - backed her own act, Martin Bashir.
- Cowell: Olivia Olson - concluded that the public would like to see Bashir through to next week more.

=== Week 2 (2 November) ===
- Musical Guest: James Arthur ("Quite Miss Home")

Acts' performances on the second live show
Act	Category (mentor)	Order	Song	Result
Jonny Labey	16-30s (Walsh)	1	"Are You Gonna Be My Girl"	Eliminated (Deadlock)
Jenny Ryan	Over 31s (Scherzinger)	2	"This Is My Life"	Safe
No Love Lost	Groups (Cowell)	3	"Would I Lie to You?" (semi-original song)	Saved by Cowell
Victoria Ekanoye	Over 31s (Scherzinger)	4	"Why Don't You Love Me"	Eliminated (Fewest Public Votes)
Max and Harvey	Groups (Cowell)	5	"Cool"	Safe
Kevin McHale	16-30s (Walsh)	6	"Dance Monkey"	Saved by Walsh
Try Star	Groups (Cowell)	7	"Swing Low, Sweet Chariot"	Saved by Scherzinger
Martin Bashir	Over 31s (Scherzinger)	8	"Easy"	Bottom Three
V5	Groups (Cowell)	9	"Despacito"/"Mi Gente"	Safe
Vinnie Jones	Over 31s (Scherzinger)	10	"Lip Up Fatty"	Safe
Megan McKenna	16-30s (Walsh)	11	"Stronger" (original song)	Safe (Highest Votes)

Judges' votes to eliminate

- Walsh: Martin Bashir - backed his own act, Jonny Labey.
- Scherzinger: Jonny Labey - backed her own act, Martin Bashir.
- Cowell abstained from voting as he wanted to hear the public's opinion and sent the result to deadlock.

With the acts in the bottom two receiving one vote each, the result went to deadlock and reverted to the earlier public vote. Jonny Labey was eliminated as the act with the fewest public votes.

=== Week 3 (9 November) ===
Acts' performances on the third live show
Act	Category (mentor)	Order	Song	Result
Kevin McHale	16-30s (Walsh)	1	"Don't Start Now"	Saved by Walsh
Max and Harvey	Groups (Cowell)	2	"Can't Hold Us"	Saved by Cowell
Vinnie Jones	Over 31s (Scherzinger)	3	"It Must Be Love"/"House of Fun"/"One Step Beyond"	Saved by Scherzinger
Try Star	Groups (Cowell)	4	"No Diggity"	Safe
V5	Groups (Cowell)	5	"Motivation"/"I Like It"	Bottom Three
Martin Bashir	Over 31s (Scherzinger)	6	"That's Life"	Eliminated
Megan McKenna	16-30s (Walsh)	7	"Half of My Heart" (original song)	Safe (Highest Votes)
No Love Lost	Groups (Cowell)	8	"Money Where Your Mouth Is" (original song)	Bottom Three
Jenny Ryan	Over 31s (Scherzinger)	9	"The Edge of Glory"	Safe
Sing-off details
V5	Groups (Cowell)	1	"Juice"	Saved
No Love Lost	Groups (Cowell)	2	"Sorry"	Eliminated

Judges' votes to eliminate

- Walsh: No Love Lost - based his decision on whom he thought would sell more records.
- Scherzinger: No Love Lost - said that she liked V5 more consistently throughout the competition.
- Cowell was not required to vote as there was already a majority and did not say how he would have voted as both were his own acts. However, in response to No Love Lost's elimination, he said that he would organise a public vote to bring back one of the eliminated acts for the final.

However, voting statistics revealed that No Love Lost received more votes than V5 which meant that if the result went to deadlock, No Love Lost would have advanced to the quarter-final and V5 would have been eliminated.

=== Week 4: Quarter-Final (16 November) ===
- Musical Guest: Lizzo ("Good as Hell")

At the beginning of the show, Cowell stated that Safe Seats would no longer be used due to negative viewer reception, therefore all acts would face the public vote.

This is also the only live show with one contestant going home.

Acts' performances in the quarter-final
Act	Category (mentor)	Order	Song	Result
Max and Harvey	Groups (Cowell)	1	"High Hopes"	Safe
Kevin McHale	16-30s (Walsh)	2	"I Feel Love"	Bottom Two
V5	Groups (Cowell)	3	"Bang Bang"	Safe
Vinnie Jones	Over 31s (Scherzinger)	4	"I Fought the Law"/"Should I Stay or Should I Go"	Bottom Two
Megan McKenna	16-30s (Walsh)	5	"When I'm Crying" (original song)	Safe (Highest Votes)
Jenny Ryan	Over 31s (Scherzinger)	6	"Euphoria"	Safe
Try Star	Groups (Cowell)	7	"Boom"	Safe
Sing-off details
Vinnie Jones	Over 31s (Scherzinger)	1	"The Galway Shawl"	Saved
Kevin McHale	16-30s (Walsh)	2	"Something's Got to Give"	Eliminated

Shortly before the judges voted, Jones announced that he did not wish to obstruct McHale's progress and requested to withdraw.

Judges' votes to eliminate

- Scherzinger: Kevin McHale - backed her own act, Vinnie Jones.
- Walsh: Vinnie Jones - backed his own act, Kevin McHale.
- Cowell: Kevin McHale - Disregarded Jones' request to leave and said he was going with his heart, believing that Jones still had a chance of winning the competition.

=== Week 5: Semi-Final (23 November) ===
- Theme: Movies
- Musical Guest: Louis Tomlinson ("Don't Let It Break Your Heart")

At the start of the show, O'Leary announced that Cowell's request for a wildcard vote had to be declined, and that four finalists would be found amongst the remaining six acts.

Acts' performances in the semi-final
Act	Category (mentor)	Order	Song	Movie	Result
Try Star	Groups (Cowell)	1	"The Greatest Show"	The Greatest Showman	Bottom Three
Jenny Ryan	Over 31s (Scherzinger)	2	"Skyfall"	Skyfall	Safe
Max and Harvey	Groups (Cowell)	3	"Kiss You"	One Direction: This Is Us	Safe
Vinnie Jones	Overs (Scherzinger)	4	"(I've Had) The Time of My Life"	Dirty Dancing	Eliminated
Megan McKenna	16-30s (Walsh)	5	"It Must Have Been Love"	Pretty Woman	Safe (Highest Votes)
V5	Groups (Cowell)	6	"September"	Trolls	Bottom Three
Sing-off details
Try Star	Groups (Cowell)	1	"Hold Me While You Wait"		Eliminated
V5	Groups (Cowell)	2	"Con Calma"/"End of Time"		Saved

Judges' votes to eliminate

- Scherzinger: Try Star - opted to save V5 as she was "all about girl power".
- Cowell: Try Star - commended Try Star on their overall progress in the competition as they had not been singers before, but ultimately felt that V5 had a better chance of being successful outside the show.
- Walsh was not required to vote as there was already a majority and did not say how he would have voted.

However, voting statistics revealed that Try Star received more votes than V5 which meant that if the result went to deadlock, Try Star would have advanced to the final and V5 would have been eliminated.

=== Week 6: Final (30 November) ===
- Theme: Christmas; Song of the Series
- Musical guest: Kevin McHale, Jenny Ryan, The CutKelvins, Leon Mallett, Tabby Callaghan, Spencer Sutherland ("How Will I Know" / "Take Me to the Clouds Above"); and The Pussycat Dolls ("Buttons" / "When I Grow Up" / "Don't Cha" / "React")

Acts' performances in the final
Act	Category (mentor)	Order	Song	Order	Song	Result
V5	Groups (Cowell)	1	"All I Want for Christmas Is You"	N/A	N/A (Already Eliminated)	Eliminated in Round 1
Jenny Ryan	Over 31s (Scherzinger)	2	"Have Yourself a Merry Little Christmas"	6	"The Edge of Glory"	Eliminated in Round 2
Max and Harvey	Groups (Cowell)	3	"Last Christmas"	7	"Kiss You"	Runner-Up
Megan McKenna	16-30s (Walsh)	4	"One More Sleep"	5	"This" (original song)	Winner

Following the announcement that McKenna had won, she performed her winner's single, "It Must Have Been Love (Christmas for the Broken Hearted)".

== Reception ==
=== Ratings ===
Episode	Air date	Official rating (millions)^{,1}	Weekly rank^{,2}
Auditions 1	12 October 2019	6.29	12
Auditions 2	19 October 2019	5.15	21
Live show 1	26 October 2019	4.45	35
Live show 2	2 November 2019	3.89	47
Live show 3	9 November 2019	3.80	48
Live show 4	16 November 2019	<3.39^{3}	—N/a
Live show 5	23 November 2019	<3.47^{3}	—N/a
Live final	30 November 2019	<3.38^{3}	—N/a

==== Notes ====
- ^{1} The ratings over a 7-day period, including the broadcasts on ITV and streaming through ITV Hub using BARB's four-screen dashboard system (includes viewers watching on tablets/smartphones).
- ^{2} The rank for the ITV broadcast, compared with all channels for that week, from Monday to Sunday.
- ^{3} No viewing figure is available for this episode as it fell outside the top 50 programmes for the week.
