= Thailand: The Dark Side of Paradise =

2025 British documentary series

- Directed by: Zachary Bailess
- Presented by: Zara McDermott
- Country of origin: United Kingdom
- Original language: English
- No. of episodes: 3

Production
- Executive producer: Naomi Templeton

Original release
- Network: BBC Three
- Release: 8 September – 10 September 2025

Thailand: The Dark Side of Paradise is a 2025 BBC Three documentary series about tourist destinations in Thailand, focusing particularly on Bangkok, Phuket, and Pattaya; directed by Zachary Bailess and hosted by Zara McDermott. The series was released online on 8 September 2025. The series was heavily criticized for inaccurate portrayals of Thailand's safety.

The documentary posits Thailand as an increasingly popular destination for young Brits. The series begins in Bangkok, and includes visits to Khaosan Road and Soi Cowboy, and later to the country's islands. Members of the filming team were allegedly nearly arrested by Thai police for filming in Soi Cowboy, known as a red light district. The series also interviews influencers, such as Mike Yu, a young British expatriate described as living a "life of luxury", and Mac, a British YouTuber in Pattaya from the channel Mac TV Travel Learn Inspire. Mac creates YouTube content with his girlfriend named Beverly Hills.

The series was heavily criticized for inaccurate portrayals of Thailand's safety. On 13 September 2025, influencer Mike Yu issued an apology for appearing in the series on Instagram, stating he was unaware the documentary would focus on the negative aspects of Thailand. Mac also characterized the series as BBC pushing a "woke narrative."
