= Disappearance of Gaia Pope =

British teenager

Gaia Pope
- Born: 2 July 1998; Swanage, Dorset, United Kingdom
- Disappeared: 7 November 2017 (aged 19); Swanage, Dorset
- Died: Between 3:59 pm on 7 November 2017 and 10:00 am on 8 November 2017
- Cause of death: Hypothermia
- Body discovered: Near to Dancing Ledge, Dorset
- Other name: Gaia Kima Pope-Sutherland

Gaia Kima Pope-Sutherland (2 July 1998 – 7-8 November 2017) was a British teenager who went missing in November 2017 at age 19. Her body was found 11 days after her disappearance.

== Background ==
=== Early life ===
Gaia Pope was born on 2 July 1998 in Swanage, Dorset, to Richard Sutherland and Kim Pope. She had a twin sister, Maya, as well as an older sister, Clara. She attended Brockenhurst College.

=== 2013–2015 ===
In 2013, Gaia Pope was provisionally diagnosed with epilepsy. In the following months and years, she received further appointments, diagnosis, and treatment for it.

In 2014, when Gaia was 16 years old, she began speaking online with Connor Hayes, then age 22, from Bournemouth, Dorset. After speaking online, Gaia and Hayes met in person. Gaia was exploited, drugged, and raped by Hayes. Hayes allegedly threatened Gaia, saying that he would kill her and her family if she told anyone what happened. He was already under investigation by Dorset Police for unrelated matters and was a known child sex offender. As a result of the incident, her mental and physical health declined.

In December 2015, Gaia disclosed the offences to her family and mental health professionals. In her first mental health crisis, she was admitted to a hospital on 15 December. However, she felt that the rape allegation was not believed by some health professionals, as her healthcare records referred to her having "delusions of sexual assault". The incident was reported to police, who arrested Hayes on suspicion of rape on 16 December. On 17 December, Gaia was discharged from the hospital into the care of the Dorset Child and Adolescent Mental Health Service (CAMHS).

=== 2016 ===
In 2016, Gaia continued reaching out for community mental health support. Her epilepsy was worsening despite continuing to receive further treatment for it. Gaia also had weekly counselling sessions concerning her rape from the Dorset Sexual Trauma and Recovery Services (STARS).

On 15 June 2016, Gaia was told by Dorset Police over the phone that there was insufficient evidence to prosecute Hayes. Whilst Hayes was not prosecuted for Gaia's allegation, in April 2016, he was charged with unrelated offences of taking an indecent moving image of a child, possession of indecent images of a child, and paying for the sexual services of a child.

In September 2016, Gaia was discharged from community mental health services for adolescents, and no onward referral was made for mental health services available to adults. Her support from Dorset Sexual Trauma and Recovery Services also ended.

On 24 November 2016, Gaia met in person with Dorset Police, who explained that the investigation into her rape by Hayes would face no further police action. It was alleged that Dorset Police discouraged Gaia from submitting a Victim's Right to Review, a scheme allowing victims to get the Crown Prosecution Service to review certain decisions, such as declining to start or stopping a prosecution. On 29 November 2016, Gaia engaged with community mental health services after being referred for psychiatric assessment.

In December 2016, Hayes pleaded guilty to the unrelated sexual offences and sent a screenshot to her family that he had sent her a friend request on Facebook. On 15 December 2016, Gaia was discharged from the community mental health services. Despite a discharge letter noting Gaia's PTSD and suggesting that other teams working with Gaia regarding her trauma would be beneficial, there is no evidence of any referrals concerning this.

=== 2017 ===
On 3 January 2017, Hayes again contacted Gaia via Facebook. She reported this to the police, seeking a protection order against him. An order was refused and no safeguarding referrals were made. On 13 January, Hayes was served with a Police Investigation Notice, which informed him that he may be arrested if he continued any further acts amounting to harassment.

In February 2017, Gaia was compulsorily admitted under the Mental Health Act to the St Ann's mental health hospital in Poole, Dorset. Whilst there, another patient sexually harassed Pope and she reported this to staff on 28 February. No action was taken after this harassment and no safeguarding referral was made. Two days after her report, Gaia was discharged, being assessed as low risk. No safeguarding referral or onward support was arranged. Gaia continued to engage with healthcare services concerning her epilepsy. During this time she had significant seizures.

In the summer of 2017, Gaia was anxious and distressed about the prospect of Hayes being released from prison. Hayes had been sentenced to two years in prison for unrelated child sexual offences in April 2017, and given a Sexual Harm Prevention Order (SHPO) for five years. She was also under increased stress due to the removal of her Personal Independence Payments (PIP), which were returned in full following a lengthy appeals process.

In October 2017, Gaia suffered a severe mental health crisis. Her mental health was assessed in hospital. However, despite her presentation of extreme distress, she was deemed to be low-risk and not suffering from an acute mental health disorder. As had happened previously, she was discharged without any ongoing support. Earlier in the month, a social worker had engaged with Gaia and her family, but was not informed of Gaia's mental health assessment nor her hospitalization.

In the autumn of 2017, Gaia experienced extreme stress due to fears that Hayes was due to be released from prison.

In November 2017, a male sent sexually explicit images on Facebook to Gaia. According to Gaia's sister, this triggered memories of the rape in 2014. Gaia filed a police report and was scheduled to arrive at the police station to discuss this on 7 November.

== Disappearance ==
Gaia was last seen in Swanage on 7 November 2017. She was due to attend a police station about the male sending her sexually explicit images and had a GP appointment booked for 5 pm that evening in which to request a referral to access community mental health services again.

Gaia and her family called Dorset Police to confirm the appointment after her initial police report but were dismissed by officers. At this point, both Gaia and her family tried to access support from Dorset Police and health services, with Gaia being in extreme distress. Gaia called for an ambulance during a mental health crisis. An ambulance was not dispatched, instead a clinician called Gaia's mother back later that day.

Before going missing, Gaia was with her aunt, Talia Pope, at her house in Swanage and was described as "unsettled". She called her twin sister before running out of the house at 3:40 pm. Dorset Police were contacted by her aunt at 3:42 pm, who reported concerns for her welfare, describing Gaia as having "some sort of episode". This information was added to the log for the incident Gaia had previously reported regarding being sent sexually explicit images earlier that month. Due to this, no missing person report was taken, including no risk assessment and officers not being dispatched to make enquiries. Her aunt called Dorset Police again at 4:24 pm to report Gaia as missing.

Just before 4 pm, a CCTV camera captured the last known sighting of Gaia alive in Swanage. Around this time, Gaia attended a property in Manor Gardens just off Morrison Road in Swanage. She banged on the door of Rosemary Dinch, the grandmother of Nathan Elsey, a friend of hers. Dinch answered, stating that Gaia was "very upset", sliding to the floor at one point. Dinch reportedly gave Gaia a hug, to which Gaia responded. Dinch stated that Gaia was not making sense, describing her as sweaty and that she had stripped to her underwear before getting dressed. Dinch described that Gaia left looking "panicked" in the direction of the high street.

== Search and investigation ==
Dorset Police, HM Coastguard, the National Police Air Service (NPAS) and volunteers from Dorset Search & Rescue (DorSAR) were involved in the search for Gaia. The search lasted ten days, starting on 8 November until the discovery of Gaia's body on 18 November.

=== Timeline of search and investigation ===
Outlined below are some of the key moments in the investigation into the disappearance of Gaia Pope:

Date	Action
8 November	Dorset Police published their first appeal about the disappearance of Pope. They described Pope, stating they were concerned for her welfare and were searching the Purbeck area.
9 November	Dorset Police issued a statement on behalf of Pope's family, in which they stated they were "frantic with worry" and desperate to know that she was okay. During the day, a Facebook group created to help coordinate volunteers to help search for Pope reached more than 3,000 people, with a crowdfunding campaign having raised £700.
10 November	Searches continued, which involved the Coastguard and police helicopters. Dorset Police released CCTV footage that showed Pope shortly before she disappeared, running along a pavement in Swanage. They updated the description of what Pope was wearing and it was reported that volunteers had searched areas between Weymouth, Dorset, Salisbury, and Wiltshire looking for Pope. Searches included vehicle stop checks.
11 November	Pope's father posted on social media, pleading for Pope to return. He stated that he had been keeping an eye on Pope's distraught twin sister Maya as well as the address of Pope's uncle in Bournemouth in case Pope turned up there. On behalf of him and Pope's mother, he thanked those trying to find Pope.
13 November	19-year-old Nathan Elsey and 71-year-old Rosemary Dinch, who were both known to Pope, were arrested on suspicion of her murder. Pope had attended Brockenhurst College with Elsey and had knocked on the door of Dinch on the day she disappeared. Two addresses were searched in the Swanage area. Dorset Police reported that they thought Pope had "come to harm".
14 November	Dinch and Elsey were released under investigation by Dorset Police. Dorset Police continued to appeal to the public for information, stating that the last confirmed sighting was still the CCTV from Morrison Road released on 10 November.
15 November	Dorset Police stated there was nothing to suggest that Pope had left the Purbeck area of Dorset. They published new CCTV images of Pope taken from Valley Road in Swanage. The CCTV images were from approximately 2:55 pm on 7 November, less than an hour before Pope went missing. They showed her going into St Michael's Garage, where she bought an ice cream before leaving.
16 November	Social media and national newspapers reported that police had seized a car as part of the investigation and it was confirmed by Dorset Police that "a number" of vehicles had been seized. Pope's father made another appeal on ITV, whilst a lake near Swanage was searched by officers. At 2:35 pm that day, Dorset Police confirmed that a woman's clothes had been found north of the coastal path in a field and that a cordon was in place. The clothes were located by a member of the public at 10:28 am that day. At 4:30 pm, a male aged 49 years old was arrested on suspicion of murder. Police reported that the male was known to Pope but did not confirm his identity. However, this was confirmed by the suspect's father, Greg Elsey, that his son Paul Elsey was the arrested male. Paul Elsey was the son of Dinch and uncle of Nathan Elsey, who had been arrested earlier in the week.
17 November	Pope's family called on the public to join them in a mass search of Swanage for Pope. Paul Elsey was released under investigation by Dorset Police.
18 November	At approximately 3 pm, specialist search teams located a body. Whilst the body hadn't been formally identified, police were confident that it was Pope. The body was discovered less than 300 metres from where the items of clothing were located on 16 November, near the coastal path and field. The body was found less than a mile from where she went missing.

== Aftermath ==
On 19 November 2017, Dorset Police confirmed that whilst the cause of Gaia's death was undetermined due to pending toxicology, the post-mortem examination didn't identify any injuries suggesting third-party involvement in Gaia's death.

The post-mortem examination later revealed the cause of Gaia's death was hypothermia. It was believed by an entomologist that the latest Gaia had been alive was 9 November 2017.

Gaia's private funeral was held in Poole, Dorset on 8 December 2017, attended by friends and family.

== Inquest ==
An inquest was held before a jury and HM Senior Coroner Rachael Griffin between 26 June and 15 July 2022, at Bournemouth Coroner's Court.

=== Cause and contributing factors to death ===
Hypothermia was given as the main medical cause of Gaia's death. Griffin provided a narrative conclusion, stating that Gaia died approximately between 3:59 pm on 7 November 2017 and 10:00 am on 8 November 2017. Griffin reported that Gaia's mental health and mental state on 7 November, her "acute situational crisis", an epileptic seizure contributing to psychosis, and Gaia not being referred to either a crisis team or community mental health team when she was discharged from hospital on 22 October 2017 were factors that either caused or contributed to Gaia's death. Griffin reported that Dorset Police and Dorset Healthcare University Trust missed a series of opportunities to support Gaia.

=== Failings by Dorset Police ===
Whilst Griffin didn't allow the inquest jury to decide whether failings from Dorset Police's search or the way they dealt with calls contributed to or caused Gaia's death, critical evidence was heard, including Dorset Police admitting that there had been failings. Dorset Police accepted that their response was "deficient", with Griffin recording that the first 24 to 48 hours of their response was "disorganised" and lacking "clear strategy, leadership and focus".

==== Delay in Pope being recorded as a missing person ====
Griffin recorded that Gaia should have been treated as a missing person by Dorset Police as soon as she was reported missing. Despite Gaia's aunt calling Dorset Police twice, once at 3:41 pm to report Gaia having a mental health crisis and having run off and at 4:24 pm to report Gaia as a missing person, Dorset Police didn't complete a missing person report until 6:18 pm. It was only at 6:30 pm that Gaia was considered a missing person. By this time, Gaia's aunt had called police five times, with Gaia's mother also having called the police.

It was later revealed that the call handler who received the call from Gaia's aunt was not trained in responding to 101 calls or handling missing person incidents.

==== Initial response from Sergeant covering Purbeck area ====
At the time, Sergeant Sean Mallon was a supervisor in Wareham, Dorset. He was made aware that Gaia had been reported missing. However, he did not deploy police officers or hand over the missing person incident when his shift ended at 11:30 pm. Mallon's lawyer at the hearing said that Mallon had only acted as a Sergeant on four occasions prior to Gaia going missing and explained that he had "no experience or training in supervising a missing persons enquiry". As a result of this, Sergeant Mallon faced misconduct proceedings and received a final written warning by Dorset Police's Professional Standards Department.

==== Risk assessment incorrectly grading Pope as a "medium" risk missing person ====
Griffin recorded that Gaia's risk as a missing person should have been "high", with a number of witnesses also testifying this. However, Gaia's risk was initially graded as "medium". This meant that external specialist resources, including Dorset Search & Rescue (DorSAR) and HM Coastguard were delayed in being tasked to assist the search. It was only at approximately 1:30 am on 8 November that a police inspector working in the control room upgraded the risk.

==== "High-risk" missing person review not carried out for 16 hours ====
Detective Inspector Phillip Swanton told the inquest that policy dictated that an experienced detective should have reviewed the incident as soon as Gaia was graded as a high-risk missing person in order for important lines of enquiry to be established. However, the case wasn't reviewed until more than 16 hours had passed, when DI Swanton was on-call.

==== Missing person booklet not completed with Pope's family ====
When DI Swanton carried out the review, he found that all the relevant information required for a missing person investigation had not been gathered at that point. It is likely that information would have been missed, as officers had not carried out the missing person booklet to establish important information on Gaia, including her health, behaviour, and significant locations related to her. Many officers assumed that this booklet had been completed, when it hadn't been.

==== Missing person logs corrupted, duplicated, and ineffectively updated ====
Information was difficult to ascertain and officers faced confusion due to missing person logs in relation to the search for Gaia being corrupted and duplicated. A number of officers didn't document searches or enquiries they'd completed when Gaia's risk was upgraded. This meant that actions, including what was outstanding, were difficult to track. This included difficulty to confirm what areas had been searched on 7 and 8 November as the missing person log was not updated effectively.

==== Search records altered by Dorset Police officers ====
PC Taylor was the deputy search coordinator for the search for Gaia. After Gaia's body was found, PC Taylor added details to Dorset Police's search logs. Whilst it was suggested by counsel to the inquest, Sarah Clarke QC, that PC Taylor did this to make the police search look better, Taylor stated he had done it to "provide a fuller picture of what happened", not to be deceitful. Amongst other details, Taylor added a note stating that a helicopter searching might not have found Gaia due to "pockets of dense vegetation". None of the entries that Taylor made indicated that they were retrospective entries.

=== Failings by Dorset Healthcare University Trust ===
Dorset Healthcare University Trust (DHUT) admitted additional failings, such as missing opportunities when Gaia was discharged from hospital on 22 October 2017 to refer her for mental health support, despite her having been in a mental health crisis. Furthermore, there was a missed opportunity to communicate with Gaia's neurology and epilepsy team. Amongst other issues, mental healthcare professionals with DHUT documented on Gaia's healthcare records that her sexual assault was a "delusion". Furthermore, they thought that her condition was a "hoax" or a "fabricated illness". A mental health professional at St Ann's mental health hospital referred to Hayes as Gaia's "boyfriend", despite him being a man who had groomed, drugged, and raped Gaia when she was a child.

== IOPC report ==
The report by the Independent Office for Police Conduct was finalized on 11 November 2019 and published on 10 October 2023.

== Legacy ==
A candlelit vigil was held in Swanage following the discovery of her body and in May 2018 a music festival was held in her honour. Her family also launched a campaign for art to be made in her honour.

In July 2023, a BBC documentary about Gaia was broadcast, presented by Zara McDermott.
