= Wes Nelson =

English media personality (born 1998)

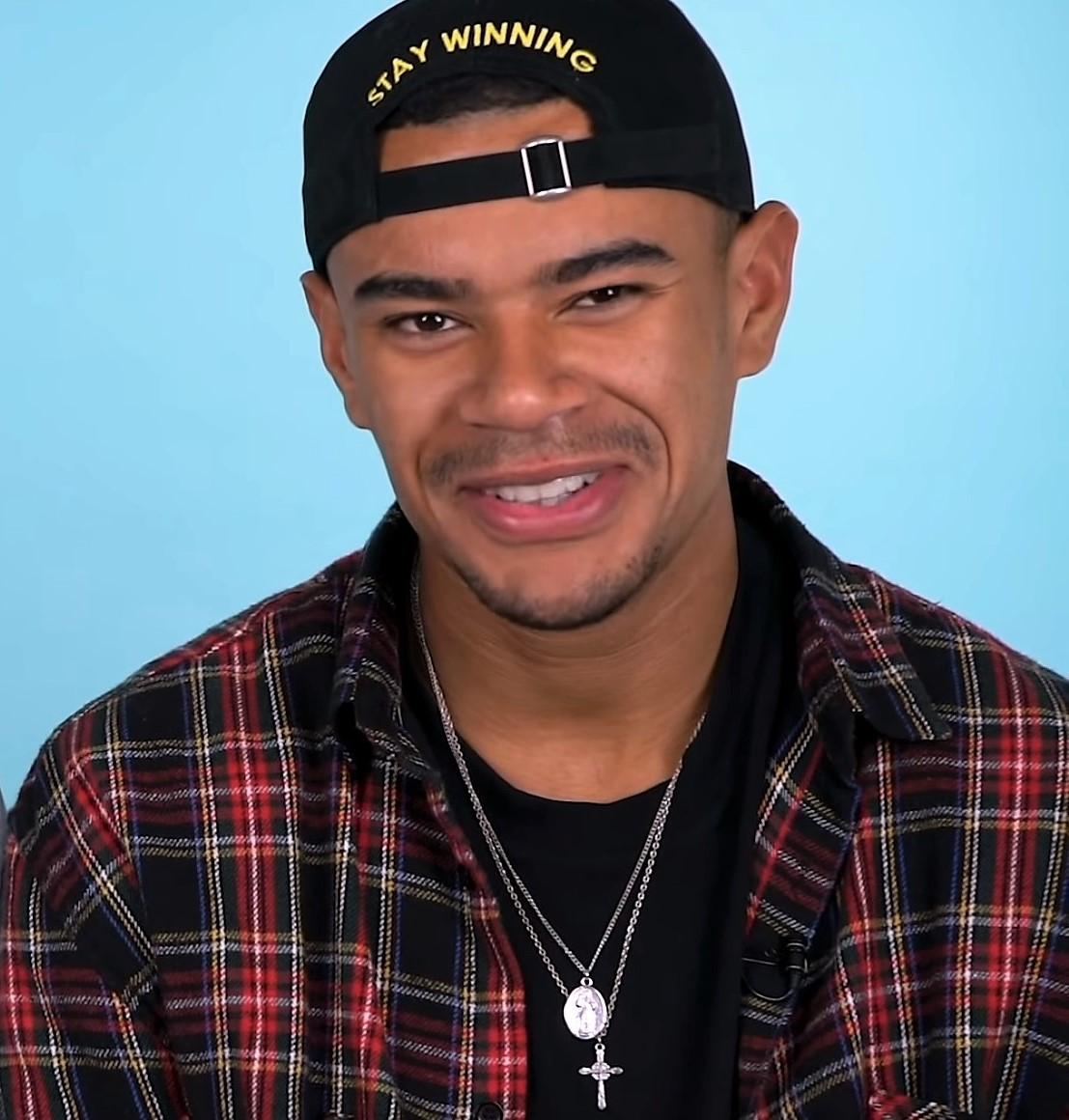
- Wes Nelson in 2019
- Born: Wesley Nelson; 18 March 1998 (age 28); Newcastle-under-Lyme, Staffordshire, England
- Occupations: Singer; television personality
- Years active: 2018–present
- Television: Love Island (2018); Dancing on Ice (2019); The X Factor: Celebrity (2019); Celebrity SAS: Who Dares Wins (2021); The Games (2022)
- Musical career
- Genres: R&B
- Instrument: Vocals
- Label: EMI Records
- Website: www.wesnelsonmusic.com

Wesley Nelson (born 18 March 1998) is an English singer and television personality. In 2018, he appeared in the fourth series of the ITV2 reality series Love Island, and has since competed on Dancing on Ice, The X Factor: Celebrity and Celebrity SAS: Who Dares Wins, as well as winning The Games.

== Career ==
In 2018, Nelson became a contestant on the fourth series of the ITV2 dating reality series Love Island. He, alongside reality star Megan Barton-Hanson, reached the final and finished in fourth place. In January 2019, Nelson participated in the eleventh series of Dancing on Ice. He was partnered with Vanessa Bauer, and finished as runner-up. In October 2019, he competed in The X Factor: Celebrity as part of a group called No Love Lost, composed of former Love Island stars Samira Mighty, Zara McDermott and Eyal Booker.

In August 2020, Nelson announced that he had signed a solo record deal with EMI Records. On 17 September 2020, he released his debut single, "See Nobody", with Hardy Caprio. On 1 April 2021, he released the single, "Nice to Meet Ya" featuring Yxng Bane. In May 2022, Nelson won the ITV revival series of the celebrity athletics competition The Games.

== Personal life ==
Nelson is the brother of professional footballer Curtis Nelson.

== Filmography ==
As himself
Year	Title	Notes
2018	Love Island	Contestant; Series 4
2019	Dancing on Ice	Contestant; Series 11
2019	8 Out of 10 Cats	Guest panellist
2019	The Crystal Maze	1 episode
2019	The X Factor: Celebrity	Contestant
2019	Sink or Swim	Contestant
2019	Celebrity Antiques Road Trip	1 episode
2021	Celebrity SAS: Who Dares Wins	Contestant
2022	The Games	Contestant

== Discography ==
=== Singles ===
==== As lead artist ====
Title	Year	Peak chart positions			Certifications	Album
Title	Year	UK	GER	IRE	Certifications	Album
"See Nobody" (with Hardy Caprio)	2020	3	—	9	BPI: Platinum	Non-album singles
"Nice to Meet Ya" (featuring Yxng Bane)	2021	33	5	63	BPI: Silver	Non-album singles
"Say Nothing"	2021	—	—	—		Non-album singles
"Habits" (with Ayo Beatz)	2021	—	—	—		Non-album singles
"Fly Away" (with French Montana)	2022	—	—	—		Non-album singles
"Message from My Ex" / "3 Words (Message to My Ex)"	2022	—	—	—		Non-album singles
"Forever"	2023	—	—	—		Non-album singles
"Good Part" (with Deeps)	2023	—	—	—		Non-album singles
"Abracadabra" (featuring Craig David)	2024	37	—	55		Non-album singles
"Barcelona" (with Billen Ted)	2024	—	—	—		Non-album singles
"Yellow"	2024	—	—	—		Non-album singles
"—" denotes items which were not released in that country or failed to chart.

==== As featured artist ====
Title	Year	Peak chart positions		Certifications	Album
Title	Year	UK	IRE	Certifications	Album
"Drive" (Clean Bandit and Topic featuring Wes Nelson)	2021	17	30	BPI: Platinum	Non-album single
"—" denotes items which were not released in that country or failed to chart.
