= Love Island (2015 TV series) series 4 =

2018 series of Love Island

Love Island
- Series 4
- Presented by: Caroline Flack
- No. of days: 59
- No. of contestants: 38
- Winners: Dani Dyer; Jack Fincham
- Runners-up: Laura Anderson; Paul Knops
- Companion show: Love Island: Aftersun
- No. of episodes: 49

Release
- Original network: ITV2
- Original release: 4 June – 30 July 2018

Series chronology
- ← Previous; Series 3 Next → Series 5

The fourth series of Love Island, a British dating reality show, began on 4 June 2018 on ITV2, and concluded on 30 July 2018. It is the fourth from the current revived series, but sixth overall. Caroline Flack presented the series, while Iain Stirling narrated it. The series opener received the highest rating on a digital TV programme since the 2012 Summer Olympics were broadcast on BBC Three; it was also the most watched programme ever on ITV2.

On 30 July 2018, the series was won by Dani Dyer and Jack Fincham having received 79.66% of the final vote, making this the biggest winning percentage since the show began. Laura Anderson and Paul Knops finished as runners-up. The average viewers for this series was 3.96 million, up 1.44 million on the previous series.

== Production ==
During the final of the previous series on 24 July 2017, it was confirmed that Love Island would return for a fourth series due to air the following year. It became the fourth series from the current revived format, but sixth series overall. Caroline Flack and Iain Stirling were confirmed to continue their roles as presenter and narrator, respectively. The first 10-second teaser for the new series began airing on 21 April 2018 with a second teaser released on 29 April. A full-length trailer was released on 17 May, which Stephanie Chase of Digital Spy pointed out included "all our favourite lingo from the show". On 23 May, it was confirmed that the series would begin on 4 June on ITV2. On 27 May, it was announced that a new spin-off, "Love Island: The Morning After", had been commissioned for the series. It was hosted by Kem Cetinay and Arielle Free and was a daily podcast that delivered the freshest gossip to the fans. First look pictures of the villa were released on 31 May. The sixteenth episode of the series, first broadcast on 21 June 2018, featured a tribute to series 2 contestant Sophie Gradon, who died on 20 June.

Some of the episodes in this series were aired outside of the usual 9pm timeslot due to the FIFA World Cup.

== Islanders ==
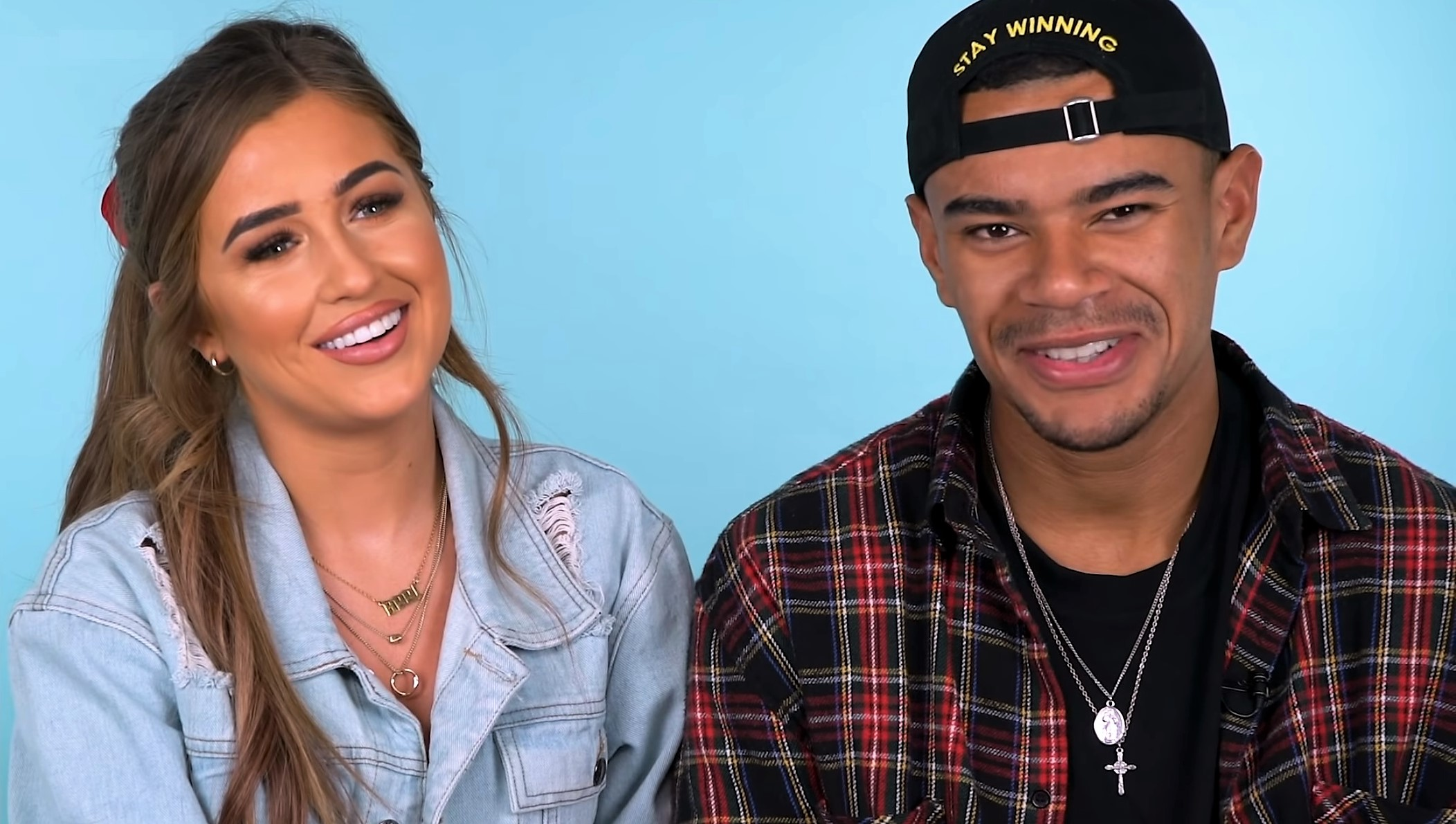
Series four contestants Georgia Steel and Wes Nelson.

Angela Jain, the managing director at ITV Studios Entertainment, wanted the series to feature "some surprising cast members", who the audience would not expect to see. She explained that she wanted "enough cast that feels like they are absolutely heart and soul Love Island – and then a certain percentage of people who feel genuinely new to telly and genuinely surprising." When asked whether a former contestant could appear in this series, executive producer Andy Cadman did not rule out anything, but said he struggled to imagine it. The first Islanders for the fourth series were released on 28 May 2018, just one week before the launch. However, throughout the series, more Islanders entered the villa to find love. Niall Aslam's decision to leave the series voluntarily for "personal reasons" marks the first time since the second series where an Islander voluntarily left the show. Niall later said he left because of "stress-induced psychosis." The series was won by Dani Dyer and Jack Fincham having received 79.66% of the final vote.

Islander	Age	Hometown	Entered	Exited	Status	Ref
Dani Dyer	21	London	Day 1	Day 59	Winner	
Jack Fincham	26	Essex	Day 1	Day 59	Winner	
Laura Anderson	29	Stirling	Day 1	Day 59	Runner-up	
Paul Knops	31	Bournemouth	Day 43	Day 59	Runner-up	
Josh Denzel	27	London	Day 8	Day 59	Third place	
Kazimir Crossley	23	London	Day 26	Day 59	Third place	
Megan Barton-Hanson	24	Southend-on-Sea	Day 8	Day 59	Fourth place	
Wes Nelson	20	Staffordshire	Day 1	Day 59	Fourth place	
Alex George	27	Carmarthen	Day 1	Day 57	Dumped	
Alexandra Cane	27	Hertfordshire	Day 39	Day 57	Dumped	
Jack Fowler	22	London	Day 26	Day 53	Dumped	
Laura Crane	23	Devon	Day 43	Day 53	Dumped	
Josh Mair	21	Birmingham	Day 43	Day 50	Dumped	
Stephanie Lam	23	Hertfordshire	Day 43	Day 50	Dumped	
Georgia Steel	20	York	Day 4	Day 47	Dumped	
Sam Bird	25	Norwich	Day 19	Day 47	Dumped	
Charlie Brake	23	Chelsea	Day 26	Day 43	Dumped	
Ellie Brown	20	Newcastle	Day 15	Day 43	Dumped	
Idris Virgo	25	Birmingham	Day 37	Day 40	Dumped	
Kieran Nicholls	26	London	Day 37	Day 40	Dumped	
Samira Mighty	22	London	Day 1	Day 40	Walked	
Frankie Foster	22	Cheltenham	Day 26	Day 37	Dumped	
Grace Wardle	25	London	Day 26	Day 37	Dumped	
Darylle Sargeant	24	Hertfordshire	Day 26	Day 33	Dumped	
Ellie Jones	22	Essex	Day 26	Day 33	Dumped	
Adam Collard	22	Newcastle	Day 1	Day 33	Dumped	
Alex Miller	28	Essex	Day 26	Day 33	Dumped	
Charlie Williams	24	Bath	Day 26	Day 30	Dumped	
Dean Overson	25	Burnley	Day 26	Day 30	Dumped	
Jordan Adefeyisan	23	Manchester	Day 26	Day 30	Dumped	
Savanna Darnell	22	Sheffield	Day 26	Day 30	Dumped	
Zara McDermott	21	Essex	Day 15	Day 25	Dumped	
Eyal Booker	22	London	Day 1	Day 25	Dumped	
Rosie Williams	26	South Wales	Day 4	Day 20	Dumped	
Charlie Frederick	23	Plymouth	Day 8	Day 13	Dumped	
Hayley Hughes	21	Liverpool	Day 1	Day 13	Dumped	
Niall Aslam	23	Coventry	Day 1	Day 9	Walked	
Kendall Rae-Knight	26	Blackpool	Day 1	Day 6	Dumped	

=== Future appearances ===
In 2022, Adam Collard returned as a bombshell on series 8.

In 2023, Eyal Booker, Megan Barton-Hanson, Jack Fowler, and Georgia Steel appeared on season one of Love Island Games.

In 2024, Steel returned for series one of Love Island: All Stars.

In 2025, Kaz Crossley returned for series two of Love Island: All Stars.

In 2026, Charlie Frederick returned for series three of Love Island: All Stars.

== Coupling and elimination history ==
The couples were chosen shortly after the contestants entered the villa. After all of the girls entered, the boys were asked to choose a girl to pair up with. Alex G was paired with Samira, Eyal with Hayley, Jack Fi and Dani paired up, Niall and Kendall coupled up, and Wes paired up with Laura A. Adam then entered the villa and was told he would be stealing one of the girls the following day.

	Week 1			Week 2		Week 3	Week 4	Week 5		Week 6		Week 7		Week 8			Week 9		Final	
	Day 1	Day 2	Day 6	Day 10	Day 12	Day 20	Day 25	Day 30	Day 33	Day 37	Day 40	Day 43		Day 47	Day 50	Day 53	Day 56	Day 57	Final	
Jack Fi	Dani		Dani	Dani	Alex G & Samira; Charlie F & Hayley; Least compatible	Dani	Safe	Dani	Safe	Safe	Dani	Safe		Dani	Safe	Safe	Laura A & Paul to dump	Finalist	Split the £50k	Winner (Day 59)
Dani	Jack Fi		Jack Fi	Jack Fi	Alex G & Samira; Charlie F & Hayley; Least compatible	Jack Fi	Safe	Jack Fi	Safe	Safe	Jack Fi	Safe		Jack Fi	Safe	Safe	Laura A & Paul to dump	Finalist	Winner (Day 59)	
Laura A	Wes		Wes	Wes	Alex G & Samira; Charlie F & Hayley; Least compatible	Wes	Safe	Jack Fo	Safe	Safe	Jack Fo	Safe		Paul	Safe	Safe	Alex G & Alexandra to dump	Finalist	Runner-up (Day 59)	
Paul	Not in Villa													Laura A	Safe	Safe	Alex G & Alexandra to dump	Finalist	Runner-up (Day 59)	
Josh D	Not in Villa			Georgia	Alex G & Samira; Eyal & Megan; Least compatible	Georgia	Safe	Kaz	Safe	Vulnerable	Kaz	Safe		Kaz	Safe	Vulnerable	Alex G & Alexandra to dump	Finalist	Third place (Day 59)	
Kaz	Not in Villa							Josh D	Safe	Safe	Josh D	Safe		Josh D	Safe	Vulnerable	Alex G & Alexandra to dump	Finalist	Third place (Day 59)	
Megan	Not in Villa			Eyal	Charlie F & Hayley; Alex G & Samira; Least compatible	Eyal	Vulnerable	Alex M	Vulnerable	Vulnerable	Wes	Vulnerable	Safe	Wes	Safe	Vulnerable	Alex G & Alexandra to dump	Finalist	Fourth place (Day 59)	
Wes	Laura A		Laura A	Laura A	Alex G & Samira; Charlie F & Hayley; Least compatible	Laura A	Safe	Single	Megan to save	Safe	Megan	Vulnerable	Safe	Megan	Safe	Vulnerable	Alex G & Alexandra to dump	Finalist	Fourth place (Day 59)	
Alex G	Samira		Samira	Samira	Charlie F & Hayley; Georgia & Josh; Least compatible	Ellie B	Vulnerable	Grace	Safe	Safe	Alexandra	Safe		Alexandra	Safe	Safe	Kaz & Josh D to dump	Eliminated	Dumped (Day 57)	
Alexandra	Not in Villa										Alex G	Safe		Alex G	Safe	Safe	Kaz & Josh D to dump	Eliminated	Dumped (Day 57)	
Jack Fo	Not in Villa							Laura A	Safe	Safe	Laura A	Safe		Laura C	Safe	Eliminated	Dumped (Day 53)			
Laura C	Not in Villa													Jack Fo	Safe	Eliminated	Dumped (Day 53)			
Josh M	Not in Villa													Stephanie	Eliminated	Dumped (Day 50)				
Stephanie	Not in Villa													Josh M	Eliminated	Dumped (Day 50)				
Georgia	Not in Villa		Niall	Josh D	Alex G & Samira; Eyal & Megan; Least compatible	Josh D	Safe	Single	Sam to save	Safe	Sam	Vulnerable	Single	Sam	Dumped (Day 47)					
Sam	Not in Villa					Samira	Safe	Ellie J	Vulnerable	Safe	Georgia	Vulnerable	Single	Georgia	Dumped (Day 47)					
Charlie B	Not in Villa							Ellie B	Safe	Vulnerable	Ellie B	Eliminated	Dumped (Day 43)							
Ellie B	Not in Villa					Alex G	Vulnerable	Charlie B	Safe	Vulnerable	Charlie B	Eliminated	Dumped (Day 43)							
Idris	Not in Villa										Single	Dumped (Day 40)								
Kieran	Not in Villa										Single	Dumped (Day 40)								
Samira	Alex G		Alex G	Alex G	Charlie F & Hayley; Georgia & Josh; Least compatible	Sam	Safe	Frankie	Safe	Safe	Walked (Day 40)									
Frankie	Not in Villa							Samira	Safe	Eliminated	Dumped (Day 37)									
Grace	Not in Villa							Alex G	Safe	Eliminated	Dumped (Day 37)									
Adam	Not in Villa	Kendall	Rosie	Rosie	Laura A & Wes; Eyal & Megan; Least compatible	Zara	Vulnerable	Darylle	Vulnerable	Dumped (Day 33)										
Alex M	Not in Villa							Megan	Vulnerable	Dumped (Day 33)										
Darylle	Not in Villa							Adam	Vulnerable	Dumped (Day 33)										
Ellie J	Not in Villa							Sam	Vulnerable	Dumped (Day 33)										
Charlie W	Not in Villa							Single	Dumped (Day 30)											
Dean	Not in Villa							Single	Dumped (Day 30)											
Jordan	Not in Villa							Single	Dumped (Day 30)											
Savanna	Not in Villa							Single	Dumped (Day 30)											
Eyal	Hayley		Hayley	Megan	Charlie F & Hayley; Alex G & Samira; Least compatible	Megan	Vulnerable	Dumped (Day 25)												
Zara	Not in Villa					Adam	Vulnerable	Dumped (Day 25)												
Rosie	Not in Villa		Adam	Adam	Laura A & Wes; Eyal & Megan; Least compatible	Single	Dumped (Day 20)													
Charlie F	Not in Villa			Hayley	Alex G & Samira; Eyal & Megan; Least compatible	Dumped (Day 13)														
Hayley	Eyal		Eyal	Charlie F	Alex G & Samira; Eyal & Megan; Least compatible	Dumped (Day 13)														
Niall	Kendall	Single	Georgia	Walked (Day 9)																
Kendall	Niall	Adam	Single	Dumped (Day 6)																
Notes	none	1	none		2	none	3	4	5	6	none	7	8	none	9	10	11	12	13	
Walked	none			Niall	none						Samira	none								
Dumped	No; Dumping		Kendall; Failed to couple up	No; Dumping	Charlie F & Hayley; Public's choice to dump	Rosie; Failed to couple up	Eyal; Girls' choice to dump	Dean, Charlie W, Jordan, Savanna; Failed to couple up	Adam, Alex W, Darylle, Ellie J Georgia and Wes' choice to dump	Frankie, Grace; Public's choice to dump	Idris, Kieran; Failed to couple up	Charlie B & Ellie B Public's choice to dump	No; Dumping	Georgia, Sam; Failed to couple up	Josh M & Stephanie; Public's choice to dump	Jack Fo & Laura C Public's choice to dump	No; Dumping	Alex G & Alexandra; Public's choice to dump	Megan & Wes; 5.86% to win	
Dumped	No; Dumping		Kendall; Failed to couple up	No; Dumping	Charlie F & Hayley; Public's choice to dump	Rosie; Failed to couple up	Eyal; Girls' choice to dump	Dean, Charlie W, Jordan, Savanna; Failed to couple up	Adam, Alex W, Darylle, Ellie J Georgia and Wes' choice to dump	Frankie, Grace; Public's choice to dump	Idris, Kieran; Failed to couple up	Charlie B & Ellie B Public's choice to dump	No; Dumping	Georgia, Sam; Failed to couple up	Josh M & Stephanie; Public's choice to dump	Jack Fo & Laura C Public's choice to dump	No; Dumping	Alex G & Alexandra; Public's choice to dump	Josh D & Kaz; 6.05% to win	
Dumped	No; Dumping		Kendall; Failed to couple up	No; Dumping	Charlie F & Hayley; Public's choice to dump	Rosie; Failed to couple up	Zara; Boys' choice to dump	Dean, Charlie W, Jordan, Savanna; Failed to couple up	Adam, Alex W, Darylle, Ellie J Georgia and Wes' choice to dump	Frankie, Grace; Public's choice to dump	Idris, Kieran; Failed to couple up	Charlie B & Ellie B Public's choice to dump	No; Dumping	Georgia, Sam; Failed to couple up	Josh M & Stephanie; Public's choice to dump	Jack Fo & Laura C Public's choice to dump	No; Dumping	Alex G & Alexandra; Public's choice to dump	Laura A & Paul; 8.43% to win	
Dumped	No; Dumping		Kendall; Failed to couple up	No; Dumping	Charlie F & Hayley; Public's choice to dump	Rosie; Failed to couple up	Zara; Boys' choice to dump	Dean, Charlie W, Jordan, Savanna; Failed to couple up	Adam, Alex W, Darylle, Ellie J Georgia and Wes' choice to dump	Frankie, Grace; Public's choice to dump	Idris, Kieran; Failed to couple up	Charlie B & Ellie B Public's choice to dump	No; Dumping	Georgia, Sam; Failed to couple up	Josh M & Stephanie; Public's choice to dump	Jack Fo & Laura C Public's choice to dump	No; Dumping	Alex G & Alexandra; Public's choice to dump	Dani & Jack Fi; 79.66% to win	

=== Notes ===
- ^Note 1: On Day 2, bombshell Adam was given the opportunity to steal one of the girls. He chose Kendall, leaving Niall single.
- ^Note 2: On Day 12, the islanders voted anonymously for the two least compatible couples. As Alex G and Samira, and Charlie F and Hayley received the most votes they then went head-to-head in a public vote to save. On Day 13, Charlie F and Hayley were dumped from the island having received the fewest votes.
- ^Note 3: On Day 25, the public voted for their favourite couples. The couples with the fewest votes were vulnerable of being dumped. The remaining safe islanders had to choose one boy and one girl to dump from the island.
- ^Note 4: As the final part for the Casa Amor twist in weeks 4 and 5, Casa Amor and the villa held two separate re-coupling ceremonies for the original islanders to choose whether to return to their previous partner or pick any new partner. Any of the new islanders that remained single by the end of either ceremony was dumped from the villa. However, if one of the original islanders remained single at the end of both ceremonies, they would still remain in the villa, but as a single islander. Dean, Charlie W, Jordan and Savanna remained single at the end the night, and were all dumped from the villa.
- ^Note 5: On Day 33, the public voted for their favourite couple. The couples with the fewest votes were vulnerable of being dumped from the island. It was then down to the only single islanders to couple up with one of them, and therefore save them from being dumped.
- ^Note 6: On Day 37, the public voted for their favourite boy and girl. The islanders with the fewest votes were immediately dumped from the island.
- ^Note 7: On Day 43, the public voted for their favourite couples. The couples with the fewest votes were vulnerable of being dumped from the island. The couple with the lowest votes was immediately dumped from the island.
- ^Note 8: The safe islanders voted between the second and third least couples on who should receive safety. They chose to grant safety to Megan and Wes. Georgia and Sam then faced a decision, return to the villa single and recouple with a new bombshell or leave as a couple. They chose to return to the villa single and recouple.
- ^Note 9: On Day 50, the public voted for their favourite couples. The couple with the fewest votes was immediately dumped from the island.
- ^Note 10: On Day 53, the public voted for their favourite couples. The three couples with the fewest votes were vulnerable of being dumped from the island. The couple with the lowest votes was immediately dumped from the island.
- ^Note 11: On Day 56, the couples voted for the couple they wanted to dump from the island. The couples who received the most votes were vulnerable of being dumped from the island. The couple who did receive any votes were safe and became finalists.
- ^Note 12: The public voted for their favorite couples. The couple with the fewest votes was dumped from the island.
- ^Note 13: The public voted for which couple they think should win Love Island. The couple with the most votes were declared the winners of Love Island and received the grand prize money.

== Casa Amor ==
On 27 June 2017, it was confirmed that ‘Casa Amor’ would be reintroduced following its success during the previous series. It is a second villa featuring new Islanders in a twist designed to put the couples to the ultimate test. Twelve new Islanders were introduced during this twist. The villa was called ’Casa Amor’ which translates to ’Love House’, and is located not far from the main villa. The new Islanders for the twist included six girls; Charlie, Darylle, Ellie, Grace, Kazimir and Savanna, as well as six boys; Alex, Charlie, Dean, Frankie, Jack and Jordan.

The twist came to its conclusion four days later when the original Islanders were given the choice of remaining with their current partner in the opposite villa or couple up with one of the new Islanders. However, as they were living in separate villas, they were not aware of each other's choice. If one decided to re-couple and the other did not, then the one that didn't would be single but still remain on the island. If both re-coupled then they would both remain in the villa with their new partner, and any remaining single new islanders would be dumped. At the end of this, Georgia and Wes became the only single original Islanders, and Charlie W, Dean, Jordan and Savanna were dumped.

== Weekly summary ==
The main events in the Love Island villa are summarised in the table below.

Week 1	Entrances	On Day 1, Adam, Alex G, Dani, Eyal, Hayley, Jack Fi, Kendall, Laura A, Niall, Samira and Wes entered the villa.; On Day 4, Georgia and Rosie entered the villa.
Week 1	Coupling	On Day 1, the Islanders coupled up for the first time. After all of the girls entered, the boys were asked to choose a girl to pair up with. Alex G was paired with Samira, Jack Fi with Dani, Eyal and Hayley paired up, Wes and Laura A coupled up, and Niall paired up with Kendall.; On Day 2, single Adam was given the opportunity to steal one of the girls. He chose Kendall, leaving Niall single.; On Day 6, the islanders re-coupled. This time it was the boys who had to pick a girl to pair up with. Alex G and Samira, Dani and Jack Fi, Eyal and Hayley, and Laura A and Wes all remained together, and Adam chose to be with Rosie, and Niall coupled up with Georgia. As Kendall remained single, she was dumped from the island.
Week 1	Dates	On Day 2, Adam and Kendall left the villa to go on a date.; On Day 4, following a public vote for which boys to send on a date with new Islanders Georgia and Rosie. Niall was sent on a date with Georgia, and Alex G was chosen to date Rosie.
Week 1	Challenges	On Day 3, the girls and the boys competed against each other in "Excess Baggage" to guess which islander some facts are about. To make their guess they had to kiss that islander. The boys won the challenge by getting the most correct.; On Day 5, in a superhero themed challenge, the girls competed against each other to prove who had the biggest superpower. Kendall was the overall winner of the challenge.
Week 1	Exits	On Day 6, Kendall was dumped from the island after failing to couple up.
Week 2	Entrances	On Day 8, Charlie F, Josh D and Megan entered the villa.
Week 2	Coupling	On Day 10, the islanders re-coupled. This time it was the girls who had to pick a boy to couple up with. Adam and Rosie, Alex G and Samira, Dani and Jack Fi, Wes and Laura A all remained together, and Georgia chose to be with Josh D, Megan coupled up with Eyal, and Hayley picked Charlie F.
Week 2	Dates	On Day 7, Dani and Jack Fi left the villa to go on a date.; On Day 8, new Islanders Charlie F, Josh D and Megan were asked to choose three other Islanders to take on dates. Charlie F chose Hayley, Samira and Georgia, Josh D picked Hayley, Samira and Laura A, and Megan chose Alex G, Eyal and Niall.; On Day 11, after winning a challenge, Wes and Laura A were rewarded with a date.; On Day 13, Georgia and Josh D left the villa to go on a date.
Week 2	Challenges	On Day 11, the couples took part in "Meals on Wheels" where a three course meal had to be passed from the boy to the girl using their mouths alone. Wes and Laura A won the challenge by completing this in the quickest time.
Week 2	Exits	On Day 9, Niall left the villa for personal reasons.; On Day 12, the Islanders voted anonymously for the two least compatible couples. As Alex G and Samira, and Charlie F and Hayley received the most votes they then went head-to-head in a public vote to save. On Day 13, Charlie F and Hayley were dumped from the island having received the fewest votes.
Week 3	Entrances	On Day 15, Ellie B and Zara entered the villa.; On Day 19, Sam entered the villa.
Week 3	Coupling	On Day 20, the islanders re-coupled. This time it was the boys who had to pick a girl to couple up with. Dani and Jack Fi, Laura A and Wes, Georgia and Josh D and Eyal and Megan all remained together, and Adam chose to be with new girl Zara, Alex G coupled up with Ellie B and new boy Sam chose Samira.
Week 3	Dates	On Day 16, new Islanders Ellie B and Zara were asked to choose three other Islanders to take on dates. Ellie B chose Josh D, Wes and Alex G, and Zara chose Alex G, Eyal and Adam.; On Day 19, Eyal and Megan left the villa to go on a date.; On Day 20, new islander Sam was asked to choose three other Islanders to take on a date. He chose, Rosie, Samira and Ellie B.
Week 3	Challenges	On Day 18, the girls took part in "Girls Night In", where they were faced with a number of slumber party themed games.
Week 3	Exits	On Day 20, Rosie was dumped from the island after failing to couple up.
Week 4	Entrances	On Day 26, Alex M, Charlie B, Dean, Frankie, Jack Fo and Jordan entered the villa, and Charlie W, Darylle, Ellie J, Grace, Kazimir and Savanna entered Casa Amor.
Week 4	Challenges	On Day 22, the couples took part in a number of music festival themed games.; On Day 23, the Islanders took part in a quiz about their other half. The Islanders wrote down the answers to the questions, and if it matched their partner's then they'd score a point. Dani and Jack Fi won the challenge with the most points; On Day 24, the Islanders took part in a game of "Snog, Marry, Pie", where both the boys and girls were tasked with choosing an islander of the opposite gender, to snog, marry and pie, using wedding rings and pies.; On Day 27, the Islanders in the main villa went head-to-head again with the Islanders in Casa Amor, where they took part in a number of challenges. For every challenge won they would earn a point, where the villa with the most points at the end would receive a party.
Week 4	Exits	On Day 25, after receiving the fewest public votes, Adam and Zara, Alex G and Ellie B, and Eyal and Megan were in danger of leaving. The remaining Islanders had to choose one boy and one girl to dump from the island. The boys chose Zara, and the girls chose Eyal.; On Day 26, Adam, Alex G, Jack Fi, Josh D, Sam and Wes moved out of the villa and moved into Casa Amor.
Week 5	Coupling	On Day 30, the original Islanders were told that they would be re-coupling. They were only given the option to remain in their current couple or to choose one of the new Islanders. However, as the boys and the girls were living in separate villas, they were not aware of what the other one chose. If one decided to re-couple and the other did not, then they would be single but still remain on the island. If both re-coupled then they would both remain in the villa with their new partner, and any remaining single new islanders would be dumped. Already single Adam chose Darylle, and Megan chose Alex M. Dani and Jack Fi stayed loyal, and Samira and Sam both decided to recouple with Frankie and Ellie J respectively, and Alex G and Ellie B chose Grace and Charlie B. Laura A chose Jack Fo, whereas Wes chose to remain single, and Josh D brought Kazimir to the villa leaving Georgia single.; On Day 33, after the public voted for their favourite couple, it was announced that Adam & Darylle, Alex M & Megan, and Ellie J & Sam had the fewest votes. It was then down to the only single Islanders Georgia and Wes to couple up with one of them, and therefore save them from being dumped. Georgia chose to couple up with Sam, and Wes chose Megan.
Week 5	Dates	On Day 33, as the only single Islanders, Georgia and Wes were given the opportunity to go on two dates. Georgia chose Jack Fo and Sam, and Wes chose Darylle and Megan.
Week 5	Challenges	On Day 31, the couples took part in "Babewatch", where they competed against each other in a number of beach themed challenges. Charlie B and Ellie B were the overall winners of the challenge.; On Day 34, the boys and the girls competed to get each other's hearts racing the most by performing sexy dances. The boys were the overall winners of this challenge.
Week 5	Exits	On Day 30, Charlie W, Dean, Jordan and Savanna were dumped from the island after failing to couple up.; On Day 33, Adam, Alex M, Darylle and Ellie J were dumped after failing to be chosen by Georgia or Wes to be in a couple with them.
Week 6	Entrances	On Day 37, Idris and Kieran entered the villa.; On Day 39, Alexandra entered the villa.
Week 6	Dates	On Day 37, Josh D and Kazimir left the villa to go on a date.; On Day 38, new Islanders Idris and Kieran were asked to choose another Islander to take on a date. Idris chose Laura A, and Kieran picked Georgia.; On Day 39, before entering the villa, new Islander Alexandra went on dates with both Alex and Jack Fo.
Week 6	Coupling	On Day 40, the Islanders recoupled, this time with the girls choosing which boy they'd like to couple up with. Dani and Jack Fi, Laura A and Jack Fo, Georgia and Sam, Megan and Wes, Ellie B and Charlie B, and Kazimir and Josh D all remained together, and Alexandra coupled up with Alex G for the first time. This left Idris and Kieran single, who were subsequently dumped from the island.
Week 6	Challenges	On Day 40, the boys took part in a sexy rescue mission. Dressed as a fireman, they had to perform a strip tease, endure a number of obstacles and rescue a cat from a tree for the girl they're coupled with. Idris was chosen as the winner of this challenge.; On Day 41, the couples played "Twitter Bingo" where they took part in a quiz based on viewers opinions.
Week 6	Exits	On Day 37, the public voted for their favourite boy and girl. As Frankie and Grace received the fewest votes, they were dumped from the island.; On Day 40, Samira voluntarily left the villa. On the same day, after failing to re-couple, Idris and Kieran were dumped from the island.
Week 7	Entrances	On Day 43, Josh M, Laura C, Paul and Stephanie entered the villa.
Week 7	Dates	On Day 48 as a result of winning the challenge Jack Fo and Laura C left the villa to go on a date.
Week 7	Challenges	On Day 42, the couples took part in a quiz guessing who came top of a public poll about them.; On Day 48, the couples took part in 'Master Baker' where the boys were blindfolded and attached to the girl's body and they had to decorate a cake. Jack Fo and Laura C won the challenge.
Week 7	Coupling	On Day 47, the Islanders recoupled, this time with the boys choosing which girl they'd like to couple up with. As Sam and Georgia had previously decided to remain in the villa apart, they were not permitted to choose each other. However, they refused to recouple. As a result of this, they were dumped from the island. Elsewhere, Dani and Jack Fi, Megan and Wes and Kazimir and Josh D, Alexandra and Alex G all remained together while Josh M coupled up with Stephanie, Jack Fo chose to couple up with Laura C and Paul chose to couple up with Laura A.
Week 7	Exits	On Day 43, the viewers voted for their favourite couples. As Charlie B and Ellie B received the fewest votes, they were dumped from the island.; On Day 47, Sam and Georgia were dumped from the island after refusing to recouple.
Week 8	Challenges	On Day 50, the girls competed against each other in "Ladies Day" where they raced around a course on a horse space hopper. Laura C was the eventual winner of this challenge.; On Day 51, the boys took a lie detector test with the girls asking the questions.; On Day 52, the Islanders took part in "Shake it Off" where they were split into two teams and had to guess the missing words in various media headlines.; On Day 53, the couples had their parenting skills tested by looking after dolls.
Week 8	Dates	On Day 50, Alex and Alexandra left the villa to go on a date.; On Day 54, Dani and Jack, Alex and Alexandra, and Laura and Paul left the villa to go on their final Love Island date.; On Day 55, Megan and Wes, and Kazimir and Josh left the villa to go on their final Love Island date.
Week 8	Exits	On Day 50, Josh M and Stephanie were dumped from the island after receiving the fewest public votes to save.; On Day 53, Jack Fo and Laura C were dumped from the island after receiving the fewest public votes to save.
Week 9	Challenges	On Day 59, as winners, Dani and Jack Fi were given the choice of two envelopes. One containing £50,000 and the other containing nothing. As Jack Fi picked the one with the money in, he was given the choice to keep it for himself of split the money with Dani. He chose to share.
Week 9	Exits	On Day 57, Alex G and Alexandra were dumped from the island having received the fewest public votes following the Islanders anonymous vote for the couple they wanted to dump. As Alex G and Alexandra, Josh D and Kazimir, and Laura A and Paul received the most votes they then went head-to-head in a public vote to save.; On Day 59, Megan and Wes left the villa in fourth place, and Kazimir and Josh D finished third. Dani and Jack Fi were then voted the winners, leaving Laura A and Paul as runners-up.

== Ratings ==
Official ratings are taken from BARB and include ITV2 +1. Because the Saturday episodes are weekly catch-up episodes rather than nightly highlights, these are not included in the overall averages. The series launch on 4 June 2018 was the most watched digital TV programme since the 2012 Summer Olympics were broadcast on BBC Three, and the most watched ever on ITV2, this was overtaken by the episode that aired on 8 July 2018 which had 4.46 million viewers.

	Viewers (millions)								
	Week 1	Week 2	Week 3	Week 4	Week 5	Week 6	Week 7	Week 8	Week 9
Sunday		3.65	3.95	3.74	4.27	4.46	3.94	3.64	4.13
Monday	4.05	3.76	3.86	3.56	4.17	4.17	4.01	4.07	4.32
Tuesday	3.91	4.00	4.00	3.98	3.83	4.11	4.01	3.88	
Wednesday	3.81	3.88	4.04	4.09	3.97	4.03	3.79	3.82	
Thursday	3.63	3.87	3.71	4.36	4.31	3.75	3.89	3.84	
Friday	3.66	3.71	3.63	4.22	4.13	3.99	3.86	3.80	
Weekly average	3.81	3.81	3.87	3.99	4.11	4.09	3.92	3.84	4.23
Running average	3.81	3.81	3.83	3.87	3.92	3.95	3.94	3.93	3.96
Series average	3.96								
Weekly Hotlist		1.09	0.88	1.09	1.23	0.86	0.89	0.73	0.89
Aftersun		1.40	1.66	1.41	1.86	2.18	1.59	1.59	1.71
