= Dorset Search and Rescue =

Dorset Search and Rescue (DorSAR)
- Formation: 2004
- Founded: 2004
- Type: Registered charity
- Registration no.: 1121658
- Purpose: Search and rescue
- Headquarters: Winfrith
- Region served: Dorset, England
- Employees: 0
- Volunteers: 70 (2023)
- Website: https://www.dorsar.org.uk/

Dorset Search and Rescue (DorSAR) is a Registered Charity who work with Dorset Police, HM Coastguard & other emergency services in the search and recovery of missing persons and other search related incidents.

The organisation is affiliated with the Association of Lowland Search And Rescue, who are the governing body for all lowland search and rescue teams. They are analogous to a mountain search and rescue team, but instead cover the complex lowland areas in Dorset, which include the sheer cliffs around the Isle of Portland, the Dorset Downs, and the Jurassic Coast, as well as several large heathlands.

== Service ==
DorSAR has about fifty volunteers, all of whom are professionally trained to a national standard. They also have a professionally equipped command & control vehicle, a water search vehicle, and a number of 4x4 member owned & operated vehicles. The team is also equipped and trained to provide initial advanced medical care and the administering of appropriate medication when necessary. As with all UK land-based SAR actions, the response and ownership of the incident, along with the activation and tasking, is carried out by the local police force - although the actual searching is carried out by specialist volunteers, such as DorSAR.

Callouts go out to all members who either reply, "yes yes", "no no", or a time they are able to start. DorSAR then sends out a grid reference to the rendezvous point. They then mobilise the command vehicle, based in Bovington.

== History ==
DorSAR was founded in 2004 by Bob Knott, a member of Hampshire Search and Rescue. He realised that Dorset did not have a similar organisation, and so wrote to the Daily Echo, and received about twelve replies, allowing the organisation to start work.

=== Searches ===
DorSAR have been heavily involved in many of the key searches for missing people in Dorset. Among these are:

- Sylvia Jeeves, who went missing near Iford in 2022.
- In May 2022, David Haw fell overboard from a rigid inflatable boat in Poole Harbour. The Poole Regatta was underway at the time, and was cancelled as a result. His body was found 12 days later, still in the harbour, and Morgan George Smith, 21, from Southampton, was charged by Dorset Police with gross negligence manslaughter after it transpired the RIB had crashed into a navigation marker.
- In March 2023, the search for 95-year-old Michael Norman.
- On 18 April 2023, they were involved in the search for a missing 16 year old girl in Weymouth, near the Manor Roundabout. She was found the next day, on 19 April.
- In January 2023, Steven Clarke went missing from Wareham. DorSAR were deployed to a large scale search. As part of the search, they worked with Dorset Police, Dorset & Wiltshire Fire and Rescue, HM Coastguard, Wiltshire and Hampshire Search and Rescue, Wessex Water Rescue and Wessex 4x4.
- In 2017, Gaia Pope, a 19-year-old woman with severe epilepsy, ran away from her aunt's house in Swanage. DorSAR were called out on five occasions to assist in the searches, on November 8, 11, 12, 16 and 18.
