= Wanted Down Under =

BBC television show

- Genre: Factual
- Presented by: Nadia Sawalha (2007–2009); Nicki Chapman (2009—2020)
- Countries of origin: Belfast, United Kingdom
- Original language: English
- No. of series: 14(as of January 2020)

Production
- Executive producer: Paul Connolly
- Producers: Jacqui Berkeley; Will Ridgeon (2009—2011)
- Running time: 45 / 60 minutes
- Production company: BBC Studios Factual Entertainment Productions

Original release
- Network: BBC One
- Release: 15 June 2007 – 13 February 2020

Wanted Down Under is a BBC One morning television series, which ran from 2007 to 2020. The programme shows families considering emigrating from the UK to either Australia or New Zealand.

In 2015, Wanted Down Under was BBC1's best performer in the morning slot from 9:15 to 10:00 am.

== Format ==
BBC One's Wanted Down Under aimed to assist participants from across the UK decide whether or not to move to Australia or New Zealand The participants spend a week in an Australian or New Zealand city to consider property and work and lifestyle opportunities before checking the financial cost. After experiencing what a move could offer, the participants were then shown messages from their and friends and families back home before voting whether to stay.

== Wanted Down Under Revisited ==
a retrospective programme catching up with previous families to see if they have moved.
