= Irene Gauthier =

American massage teacher (1920–2010)

Irene Gauthier (née Simonen; June 20, 1920 – October 25, 2010) was an American massage therapist, educator and author. She helped develop myomassology as a multidisciplinary approach to massage therapy and founded Irene's Myomassology Institute in Southfield, Michigan.

She worked to develop massage into a respected trade and raise the massage profession to align with health care in the United States. She continued working until she died at the age of 90.

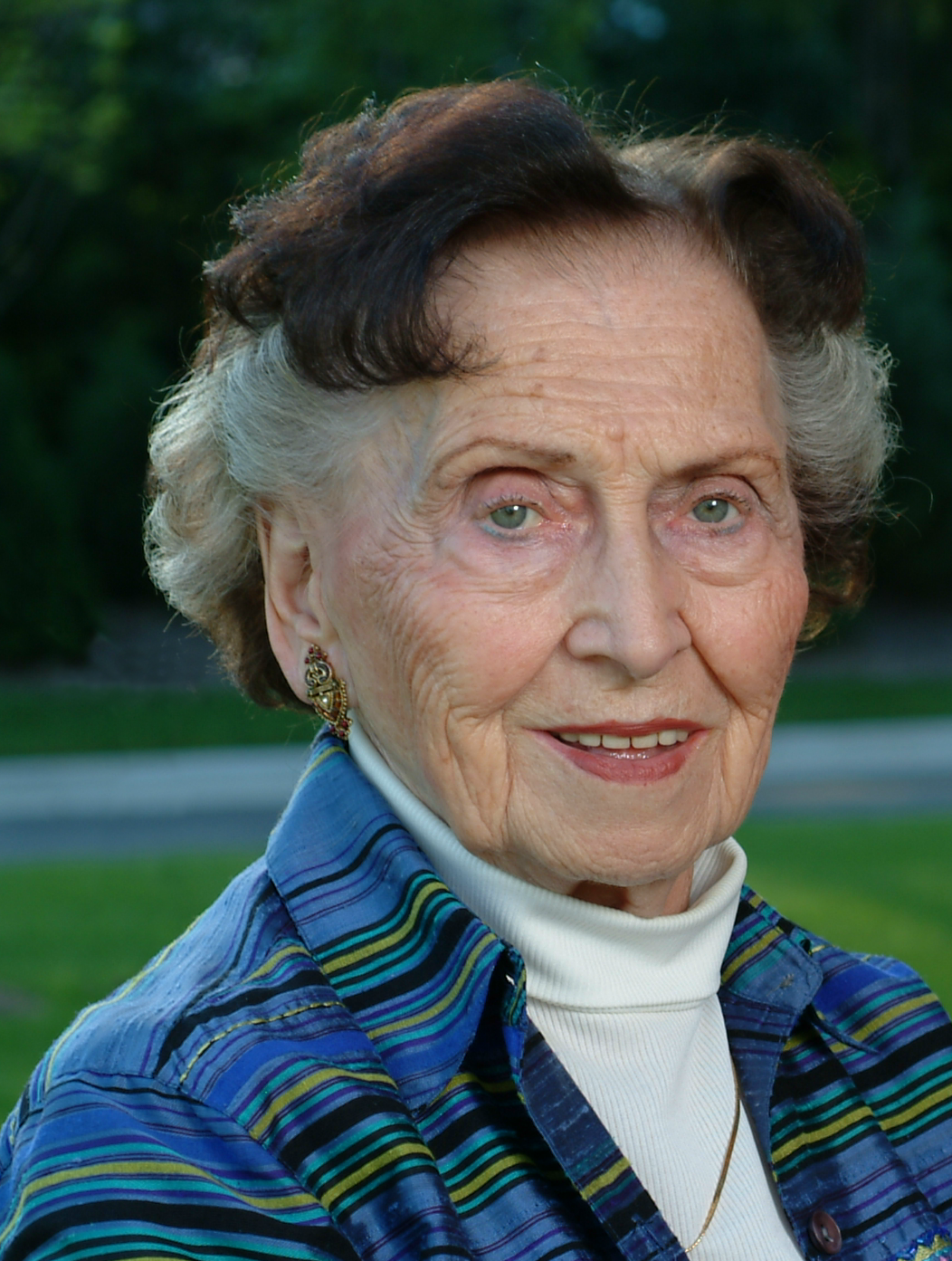
Irene Gauthier

== Biography ==
Irene (Simonen) Gauthier was born to Finnish immigrants in Pelkie, Michigan, in the Upper Peninsula. After High School, she moved to attend beauty school Detroit in 1938. She became licensed as a cosmetologist by the state of Michigan in 1939. By 1947 she owned her own beauty parlor, Rene's, on West McNichols in Detroit. After an asthma attack two years later she started learning about natural healing techniques. In 1957, she began to formally study Swedish Massage at the Steam Baths on Grand River Avenue in Detroit.

Gauthier began practicing foot reflexology massage on her cosmetology clients as they sat under the hairdryer. After obtaining a portable massage table she made house calls to practice massage therapy. She closed her beauty parlor and combined her cosmetology career with massage therapy in her own basement.

Ten years into her career, in 1968, Irene won the American Massage Therapy Association (AMTA) Member of the Year Award. Two years later she helped found both the International Myomassethics Federation and the Michigan Myomassologist Association.

Irene continued as a student throughout life. In 1975 she studied under the Touch for Health Foundation in Pasadena, California and became a Touch for Health instructor in 1976. In 1981 she received a certificate in Polarity Therapy from Dr. Said. She also studied basic, intermediate, and advanced Craniosacral therapy from Dr. John Upledger of the Upledger Institute in Palm Springs, Florida.

Her first students learned massage in Irene’s basement, where classes continued successfully until 1987, when she opened her first state-licensed school, The Myomassethics Center. The school reflected Gauthier’s broader vision for massage education, which massage educator and author Sandy Fritz later identified as an important contribution to the massage field in Michigan. According to Fritz, Gauthier was instrumental in developing myomassethics, an approach intended to broaden massage education beyond traditional Swedish massage.

Two years later, in 1989, Irene wrote the book, "The Science and Practice of Myomassology". The book was added to the curriculum and is still in use at her institute. Her massage therapy techniques were filmed in 1999 making a companion video to her textbook.

Irene's Myomassology Institute, named after Irene herself, opened in 1993 with her daughter Kathleen. The original location was expanded four times but ultimately became too small as the school's success continued. In May 2000, construction of a new building for Irene's campus began. In 2002 the 17,000 square foot facility had its grand opening.

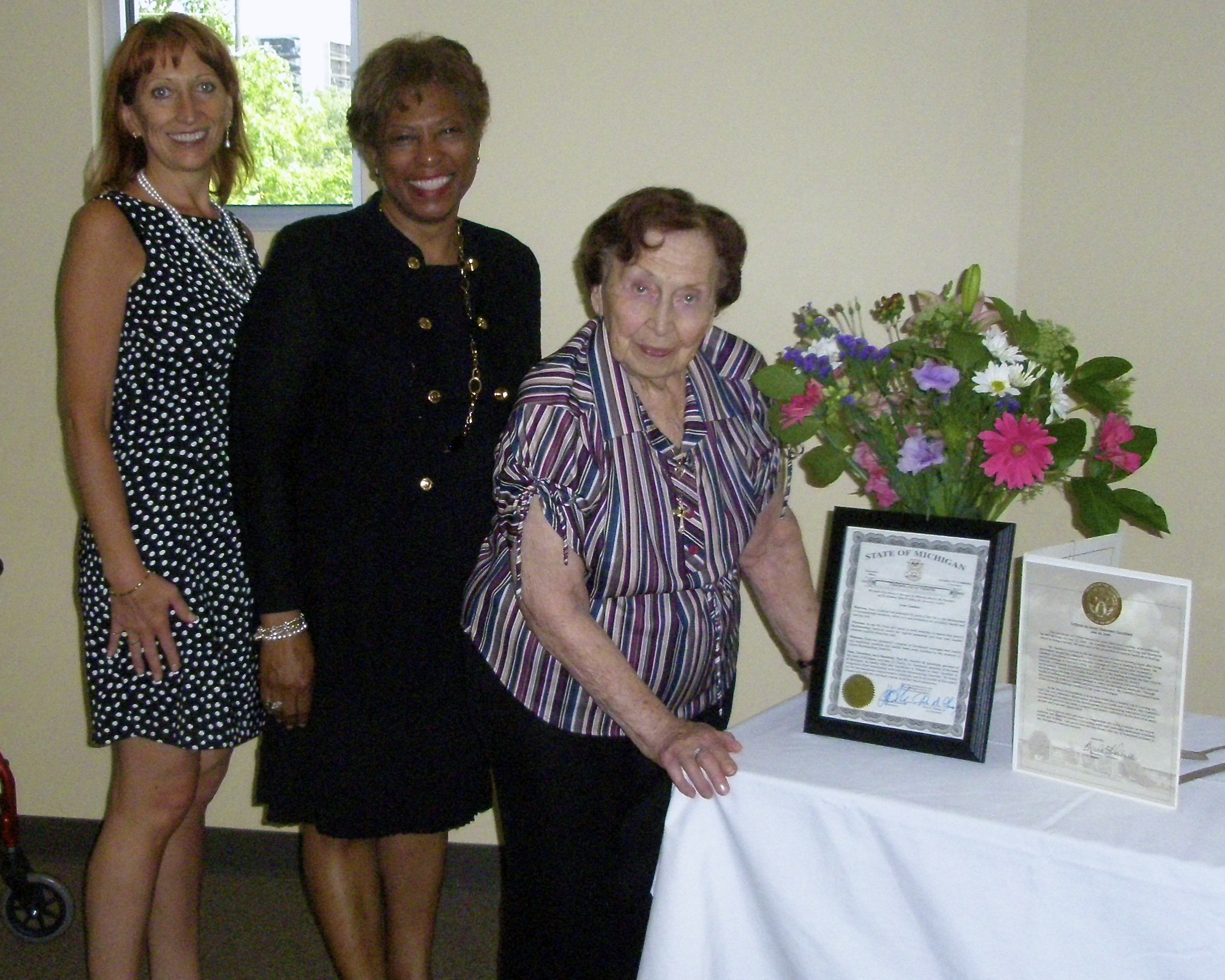
Irene Gauthier and Mayor Brenda Lawrence

At the age of 82, Irene continued to teach students at the institute. Through her work there, and at various workshops around the world she was able to help create a better understanding of health through massage therapy and holistic health practices. She received multiple awards including a Certificate of Tribute from then Michigan Governor Jennifer Granholm and a Certificate of Tribute from then Mayor of Southfield Brenda Lawrence in 2009, and a joint resolution for her many contributions both locally and globally on June 18, 2010, from the Mayor of Southfield and the City Council.

Celebrating her 90th birthday, Irene's staff held an event to break the world record for longest massage chain ever. Although this goal was accomplished with 1108 participants, the record was soon thereafter claimed by an energy drink company in Thailand. Through most of that year, Irene continued to work at her school as both a massage instructor and a massage therapist. She was often found assisting with clients as a supervisor in the school's student massage clinic. Later that year, on October 25, she died of congestive heart failure.

In 2012, Irene Gauthier was inducted into the Massage Therapy Hall of Fame in recognition of her contributions to the art and science of massage therapy at the World Massage Festival. The school Irene had founded also won the Best of Detroit award from Hour Detroit. The following year it went on to win Massage School of the Year.

Throughout her life, Irene sponsored children through Plan USA. She asked for donations to the nonprofit instead of flowers, and to this day the school's website still provides a way to donate to the charity in her memory.
