= Plan Canada =

Non-profit organization

Plan International Canada is the Canadian arm of the relief organization Plan International, a not-for-profit global movement that promotes social justice for youth and their families in around 75 developing countries.

Plan International and Plan International Canada have no stated political or religious affiliation. Plan International is a member agency of the Humanitarian Coalition.

== History ==
During World War II, the organization became known as the "Foster Parents Plan for War Children" and worked in England, helping displaced children in Europe. Foster Parents Plan opened new programs in less developed countries and was renamed "Foster Parents Plan Inc.".

Foster Parents Plan of Canada was incorporated in 1968. In the 1980s, Belgium, Germany, Japan, and the United Kingdom joined Canada, the US, Australia, and the Netherlands as donor countries. Plan was recognized by the Economic and Social Council of the United Nations. In the 1990s, Plan offices opened in France, Norway, Finland, Denmark, Sweden, and South Korea.

In the 2000s, the name Plan International was changed to "Plan". In 2006, Foster Parents Plan in Canada also changed its name to Plan and the logo was updated.

In 2011, with support from the Canadian government, Plan called on the UN to adopt October 11 as the International Day of the Girl Child. Plan International's Because I Am a Girl initiative launched on the first International Day of the Girl in 2012.

In 2015, Plan rebranded again as Plan International.

== Projects ==
In November 2007, Plan Canada traveled to Haiti with R&B singer George Nozuka to film a documentary on restaveks in Haiti.

In July 2008, Plan Canada launched its Global Food Crisis Report. In December 2008, Plan Canada shipped medical supplies to Zimbabwe to treat people during the cholera outbreak.

In January 2009, Plan Canada's partnership with The Girls' Rights Program resulted in a Girls' Rights Tour.

In May 2009, Plan announced its intent to distribute Rp 300,000 in aid to Sri Lanka. In April 2009, the company received CA$900,000 from Slumdog Millionaire. In January 2011, Plan Canada's Because I Am a Girl won a Gold Cassie in the not-for-profit category. Plan Canada also partnered with the clothing company Olsen Europe to establish the Friendship Collection.

Plan's short film, Flood Children of Holdibari, won first place in the 2009 World Bank's Social Dimensions of Climate Change section of their film festival.
