= Plan International =

International development organisation

- Founded: 1937; 89 years ago (as Foster Parents Plan for Children in Spain)
- Founders: John Langdon-Davies; Eric Muggeridge
- Type: International NGO
- Location: Woking, Surrey, England, UK
- Leader: Reena Ghelani (CEO)
- Website: plan-international.org

Plan International is a development and humanitarian organisation based in the United Kingdom that works in over 80 countries across Africa, the Americas, and Asia, focusing on children’s rights. According to its own report, in 2025, Plan International reached 49.2 million children, including 26.1 million girls, through its programming, and responded to 73 emergencies.

Plan International also provides training in disaster preparedness and recovery and has worked on relief efforts in countries including Haiti, Colombia and Japan.

== History ==
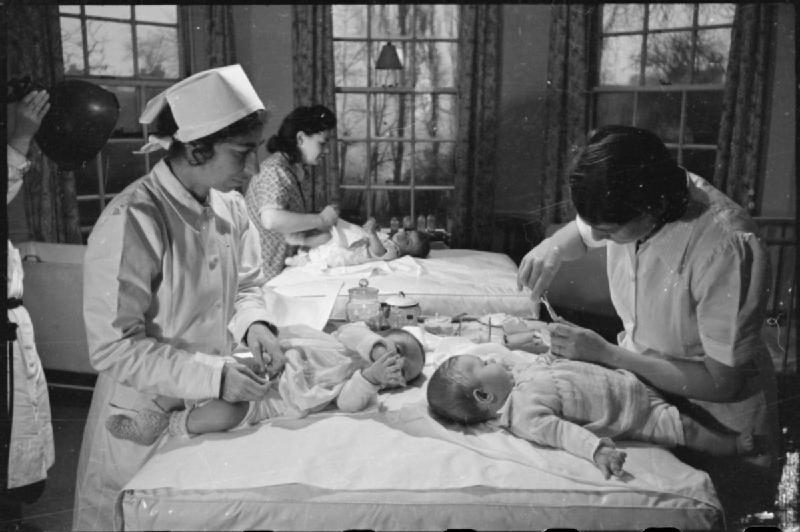
Caring for displaced children at the 'Foster Parents Plan for War Children' Nursery in Hampstead, London (1941)

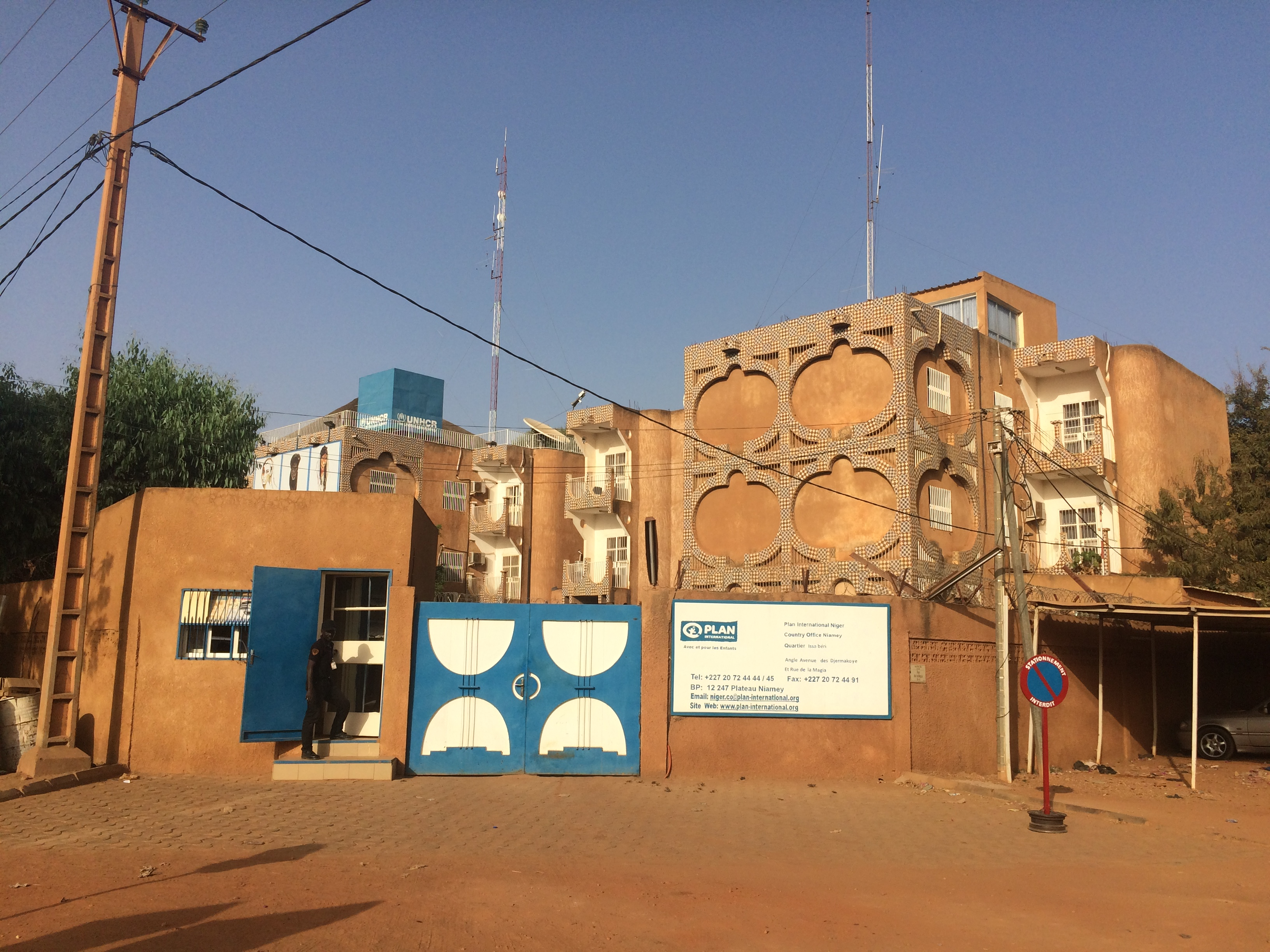
Plan International's country office in Niamey, Niger

Plan International was founded in 1937, during the Spanish Civil War, by British journalist John Langdon-Davies and aid worker Eric Muggeridge. Eric was one of five brothers, including journalist and satirist Malcolm Muggeridge. Plan International was founded as "Foster Parents Plan for Children in Spain".

During World War II, the organisation became known as "Foster Parents Plan for War Children" and worked in England. After the war, Plan International extended aid to children in France, Belgium, Italy, the Netherlands, Germany, Greece and briefly in Poland, Czechoslovakia and China. Plan International gradually moved out of these countries. It became "Foster Parents Plan Inc.".

In 1962, U.S. First Lady Jacqueline Kennedy was honorary chairwoman during the Plan's Silver Jubilee.

In 1974, the global name became Plan International, as programs now spanned South America, Asia and Africa. In the 1980s, Belgium, Germany, Japan and the UK became donor countries. Plan International was recognised by the United Nations Economic and Social Council.

In 2017, Plan International launched a new "International Global Strategy 2017–2022". The traditional blue logo was updated.

In 2023, Plan International launched its 2027 organizational strategy, which focuses on improving the lives of girls.

== Funding and accountability ==
According to Plan International's report, the organisation's income comes from individuals, corporate donations, and grants. The report states that an average of 80% of these funds is spent directly on its international programs. The remaining funds are allocated to fundraising and administration costs.

The organisation receives funding from a range of multilateral institutions to implement grants, such as from the UK's Department for International Development (DFID), the Australian Department of Foreign Affairs and Trade (DFAT), the Swedish International Development Cooperation Agency (SIDA), the United States Agency for International Development (USAID), and other multilateral agencies.

Plan International adheres to several international standards and quality assurance mechanisms including the International Non-Governmental Organisations (INGO) Commitment to Accountability Charter and the Code of Conduct for the International Red Cross and Red Crescent Movement and NGOs in Disaster Relief.

== Awards ==
- 2016 – The Global Awards: Plan International Sierra Leone Wins Global Awards.
- 2017 – Third Sector Awards: The project that has had a substantial impact on national or international life.
- 2019 – PR Daily Grand Prize as Media Relations Campaign of the Year: Plan International's Gender Equality survey received an award.
- 2022 – CORPHUB, Hong Kong: Plan International Hong Kong received several awards for its efforts for Children’s Rights, e.g. Most Outstanding International Child Care Charity Organisation of the Year.

== Notable people ==
Notable people who have been publicly associated with or have supported Plan International include Jacqueline Kennedy, David Elliot, Beau Bridges, Dina Eastwood, Scott Bakula and Nicholas D. Kristof. In 2015, Mo'ne Davis worked with the footwear brand M4D3 to design a line of sneakers, with a portion of the proceeds donated to Plan International’s Because I Am a Girl campaign. Suman Pokhrel worked for Plan International Nepal as an employee joining the organisation in 1998.

Anil Kapoor, who starred in Danny Boyle's film Slumdog Millionaire, is an ambassador for Plan India. He donated his entire fee for the movie to the NGO's Universal Birth Registration campaign. Slumdog Millionaire stars Dev Patel and Freida Pinto were among the cast members who attended a screening of the film at Somerset House in London, where over £2,000 was raised for Plan’s work in Mumbai, the setting of the film.

The organisation was featured in the 2002 film About Schmidt.

== See also ==
- Convention on the Rights of the Child
- International Day of the Girl Child
- Odisha State Child Protection Society
- National branches:
  - Plan UK
  - Plan Canada
  - Plan USA
