= Childreach =

Childreach may refer to:

- Plan USA or Childreach/Plan International
