= Body Gossip =

English teenage body image charity

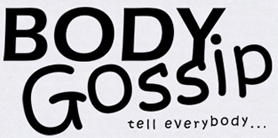
The Body Gossip Logo

Body Gossip is an organisation founded in 2006 and run by Ruth Rogers and Natasha Devon which campaigns on body image issues, regardless of shape, size, race, gender or age. Body Gossip's Gossip School body image education programme won the 2011-12 'Business hero - Heroic SME' award. Between them, Body Gossip and The Self-Esteem Team, also founded by Devon, visit three schools each week and have provided classes to over 50,000 teenagers; they also provide sessions for parents and teachers.

== History ==
In 2012, Body Gossip: The Book was published by Rickshaw Publishing which was an anthology of over 300 short pieces from celebrities and others relating to body image issues. It was co-authored by the organisation's co-founders, Rogers and Devon, together with Gok Wan. Body Gossip has also organised performances of sketches and monologues on a wide range of body image issues, including dermatillomania. On 28 November 2012, students from the Manor School in Arbury, Cambridge performed in front of the Duke and Duchess of Cambridge in an event organised by the Body Gossip education programme.

Rogers' and Devon's work with Body Gossip won them the 'Ultimate Campaigners' award at the UK edition of Cosmopolitan's Ultimate Women of the Year Awards 2012.

In 2013, Body Gossip organised a flash mob on the South Bank in London. Participants were given paper hearts on which they were asked to write what they loved about their body; they then displayed the hearts simultaneously at 1 p.m. Ruth Rogers said of the event: "Too many people don't have anything that they love about their bodies, and we thought we should try to encourage them to really look at themselves and go 'you're gorgeous'. We're bombarded every single day with negative imagery and unattainable perfection. No matter what you feel that you should look like, you look like you, and you can be the best version of you. You're your own brand of gorgeous." In the same year, writer Jane Martinson noted in a blog for The Guardian: "Statistics from campaigners Body Gossip suggest one in 10 young people will develop an eating disorder before they reach the age of 25 (with 1.6 million currently officially diagnosed in the UK ); three children in a typical British classroom are self-harming and 30 per cent of boys and 70 per cent of girls aged 11-19 cite their relationship with their body their number one worry." Body Gossip was part of an all-day event in London held to celebrate the 2013 United Nations International Day of the Girl; the organisation provided theatre and film performances based on stories submitted by members of the public.
