= PACEMaker International =

Pacemaker International is a registered non-governmental organization (NGO) that works to improve education in Kenya, majoring with the junior levels.

== History ==
Plans to start Pacemaker International were laid between March and September 2012. Peggy Ocholla founded the organization between September–December 2012 and early 2013. It was officially registered that year.

Promoting Access to Community Education (PACE) is a program created by the new organization. The PACE team began recruiting volunteers through regular visits to Loreto Limuru, Loreto Kiambu, Buruburu Girls, Aquinas High School, Starehe Boys Centre, Lenana High School and Pangani Girls High School. 63 applications were initially received. The same month, PACE trained its first bunch of 24 volunteers, assisted by TAC Tutors from Teacher Advisory Centres in Nairobi.

This pioneer class was sent to four Nairobi schools: North Highridge Primary(PARKLANDS), Edelvale(KAYOLE), Farasi Lane(LOWER KABETE) and Moonlight Primary(KIBERA). By April, the pioneering class had donated 1,721 hours in volunteer service. PACE won the Most Promising Project award-Dell Social Innovation Challenge in April 2013. The second group of volunteers were trained in May. By August, the cumulative number of volunteer service hours increased to 2,929 hours.

Led by Carol Theuri, PACE held an Amazyng Race Fundraiser in support of Youth Volunteer work. PACE also partnered with Nation Media Group in the Nation Media Groups' Newspapers in Education program. During the August 2013 Graduation Ceremony, PACE graduated its first class of Fellows into Alumni.

PACE was featured in the Clinton Global Initiative-New York as a leading example of young people making a difference, in September 2013, and also in October when PACE was featured on the International Day of the Girl Child publication. By December 2013, volunteer hours reached 5235.

Between January and July 2014, a class of 110 volunteers contributed 13,880 hours. PACE won the Harvard Graduate School of Education Bridge Pitch competition and was featured as finalists in the annual Transform Kenya Awards.

In 2016, 127 volunteers donated 100,000 hours of volunteer service.

== Principles ==
=== Vision ===
"We envision a Kenya where access to a high quality education is the norm for all children and where young people are empowered, and then engaged to lead change in their local communities."

=== Mission ===
"To create equitable learning opportunities for students in rural and slum areas of Kenya."

== Program ==
PACE recruits gap year students after they complete the Kenya Certificate of Secondary Education(KCSE). PACE trains them to become Teaching Assistants in underprivileged primary schools. The youth engage in development projects during their service.

Teaching Assistants start development projects and assist teachers with activities such as marking books, supervising exams and extracurricular activities. They submit signed time cards each week. They complete weekly reports online to give feedback and to allow their progress to tracked.

The application process is competitive. Successful applicants are selected on the basis of academic performance, demonstrated leadership qualities and the desire to improve the quality of education in underprivileged communities. They undergo an intensive one-week training program before becoming Teaching Assistants. After the training, they are posted to respective schools close to their places of residence and receive a regular stipend. They are expected to offer service for at least 15 hours per week.

Community engagement is limited to Primary education, apart from Longewan Baptist Secondary School Baringo

The youth join a Fellowship, and are called Fellows. They undergo training every fortnight to strengthen their leadership skills.

== Partners ==
=== Schools ===
- Drive Inn Primary School
- Bohra Primary School
- North Highridge Primary School
- Kawangware Primary School
- Jogoo road primary
- Edel Vale Primary School
- Dagoretti girls Rehabilitation school
- Wangu primary
- Tom Mboya Primary
- Madaraka Primary
- Farasi Lane Primary
- Oloosurutia Primary
- Pangani primary
- Jogoo road primary
- Kiwanja Primary
- Njathaini Primary
- Kamuiru primary
- ACK Karura primary
- Mathari primary
- General Kago Primary
- Athi river prison primary
- Komarock Primary
- Uhuru gardens primary
- Joseph Kang'ethe primary

==== Supporters ====
- Global Education Fund
- Nation Media Group—Provides reading materials for Reading Clubs
- Akili Dada—connects women leaders to PACE
- 25 Public Primary schools

== Recognition ==
- Clinton Global Initiative University-Education Commitment of the Year, 2012
- Dell Social Innovation Challenge-Most Promising Project, 2013
- Harvard Graduate School of Education-Bridge Pitch winner, 2014
- Transform Kenya Awards-Finalist, 2014

== Alumni board ==
The launch of PACE Alumni Board during the August 2016 graduation seeks to:

- Increase the ability and interest of high school graduates to serve as teaching assistants
- Increase awareness among youth on the benefits of volunteering
- Promote a culture of community engagement and continuous learning among the youth
- Create an informed, passionate alumni network empowered to expand educational opportunities for at risk students.
- Afser Africa project targeting Social Development Goals(SDGs)
- Increase the number of volunteers and fiscal capacity of the organisation through its #ChangeForChange campaign.
