= International Day of the Boy Child =

International awareness day

- Also called: International Day of the Boy, International Boys Day, Day of Boys, Boy's Day
- Type: International
- Significance: Recognizes the importance of boys' well-being and the challenges they face, while also celebrating the positive aspects they bring to their communities and families.
- Date: 16 May
- Next time: 16 May 2027
- Frequency: annual
- First time: 16 May 2018

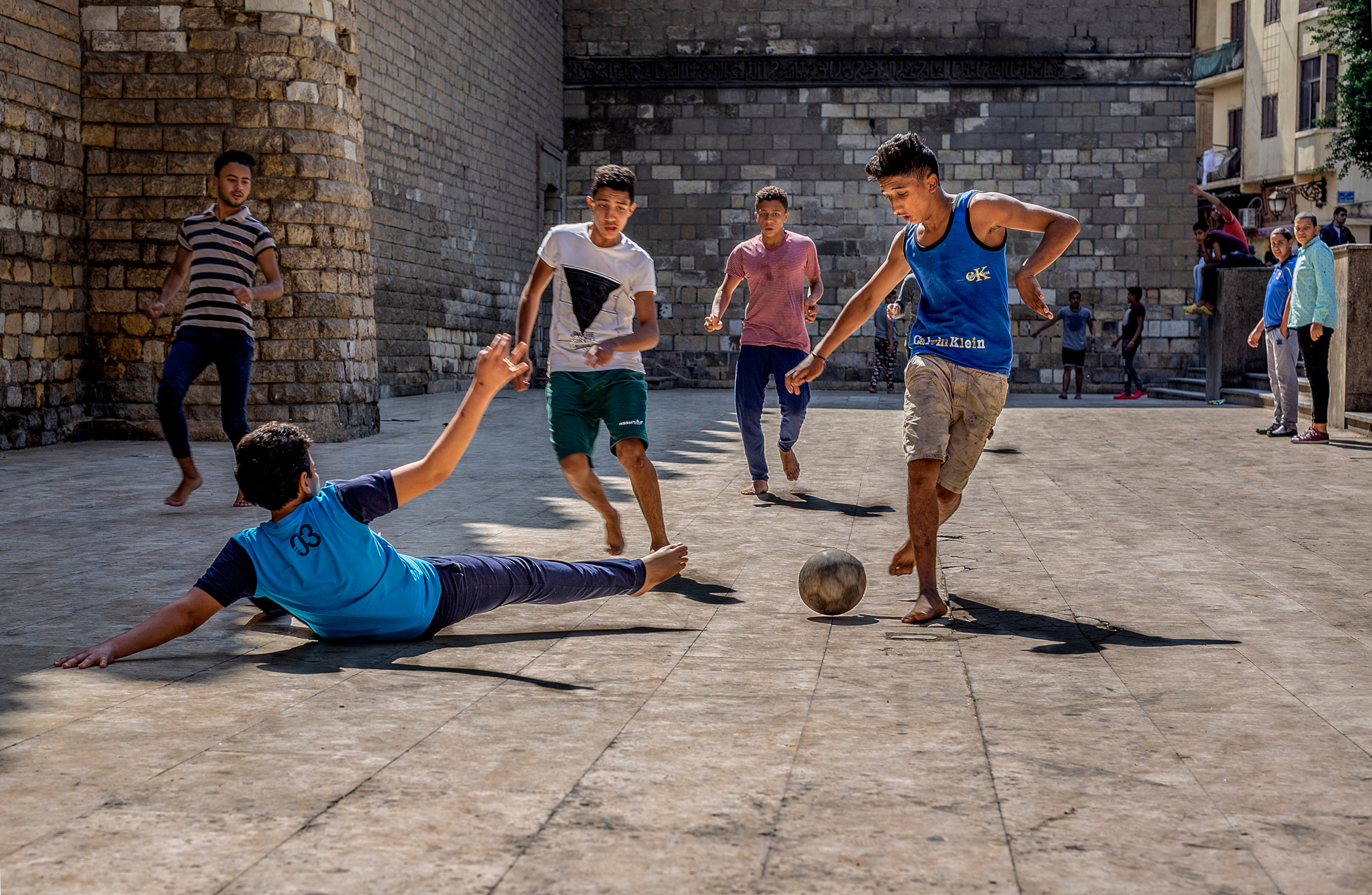
Children playing street football in Egypt

International Day of the Boy Child is celebrated on May 16th each year. The day recognizes the importance of boys' well-being and the challenges they face, while also celebrating the positive aspects they bring to their communities and families. Unlike International Day of the Girl Child, International Day of the Boy Child is not officially recognized by the UN.
