= The Self-Esteem Team =

British motivational speakers to youth

- Origin: England
- Years active: 2014–present
- Members: Nadia Mendoza
- Website: selfesteemteam.org
- Writing career
- Notable works: The Self-Esteem Team's Guide to Sex, Drugs and WTFs?!!

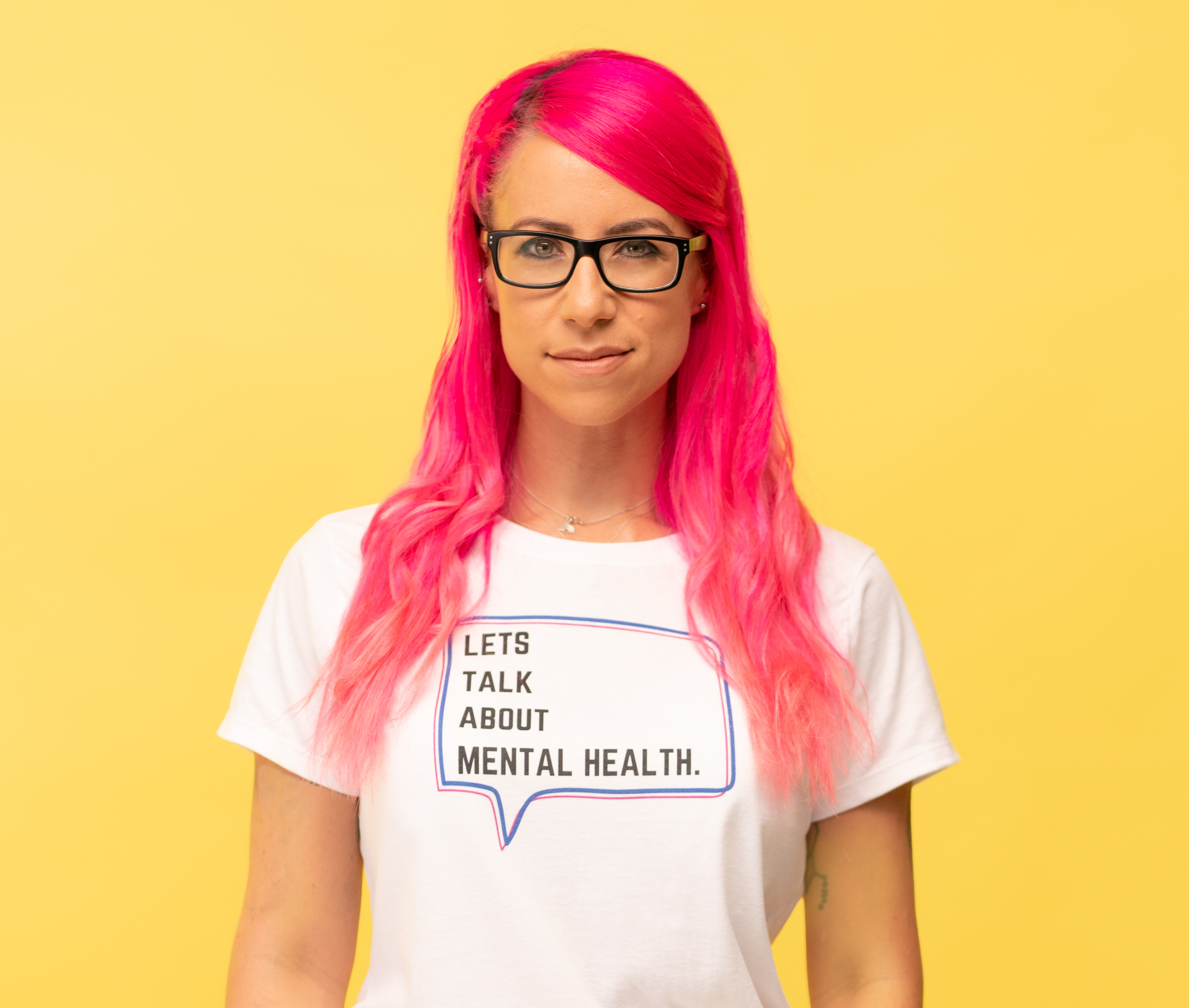
Nadia Mendoza, Self-Esteem Team founder

The Self-Esteem Team is a British organisation which delivers workshops in schools and colleges on mental health, LGBT, body image and exam stress. It was formed in 2014 by Nadia Mendoza, Grace Barrett, and Natasha Devon.

== Members ==
Nadia Mendoza is a journalist. She began her career at The Sun and became Digital Head of Showbiz and TV at Daily Star. She was raised in London before moving to Los Angeles while working for Mail Online. Mendoza has written about her experiences with self-harm and her mother's illness Progressive Supranuclear Palsy. In 2019, she campaigned to the Royal College of General Practitioners to include PSP on their curriculum for trainee GPs and it was successfully added to the syllabus.

In December 2021, it was announced that Mendoza would be releasing her debut novel called Friends Don't Tell. The YA thriller will be released in June 2022. World rights were acquired from Chloe Seager at Madeleine Milburn Agency by Polly Lyall Grant, Senior Commissioning Editor at Hachette Children’s Group.

Grace Barrett is a backing singer who has toured with artists Brother, Little Boots, and Deaf Havana. She was raised in Stoke-on-Trent in Staffordshire. In August 2021, she resigned from The Self-Esteem Team. She co-authored Friends Don't Tell.

Natasha Devon is a writer and TV pundit. In August 2015, she became the British government's first Mental Health Champion. In April 2016, the role was rendered obsolete. In July 2017, she resigned from The Self-Esteem Team.

== Campaigns ==
The group's Switch On The Light campaign, which was released for Mental Health Week 2015, featured Stephen Fry, Professor Green, Clarke Carlisle, and Charlotte McDonnell (formerly Charlie McDonnell). It is dedicated to James Mabbett, who took his own life aged 24.

Their follow-up campaign, New Years ReVolution, released in December 2015, featured Charlotte Crosby, Rachel Riley, Jamal Edwards, and Michelle Lewin.

== Awards ==
In 2014, The Self-Esteem Team won a Body Confidence Award from the All-Party Parliamentary Group for their work in education.

== Books ==
The Self-Esteem Team released their book The Self-Esteem Team's Guide to… Sex, Drugs & WTFs?!! in 2015, with a foreword by Zoella. The book is on The Reading Agency's Reading Well Books on Prescription scheme.

- The Self-Esteem Team's Guide to Sex, Drugs and WTFs?!! (6 August 2015). John Blake Publishing Ltd. ISBN 978-1784186425.
