= Plan UK =

UK non-profit organisation branch

Plan International UK
- Company type: Charity
- Industry: NGO
- Founded: 1937, Spain
- Headquarters: Surrey, UK
- Key people: Rose Caldwell
- Revenue: 64,262,000 pound sterling (2017)
- Number of employees: 204 (2017)
- Website: plan-uk.org

Plan International UK is the UK branch of the global children's rights non-profit organisation Plan International. Plan UK which works to advance equality for girls all over the world through sustainable development and humanitarian response activities in 50 countries across Asia, Africa and the Americas. The organisation also helps communities to build resilience prior, during and after emergencies. It is a registered charity in the UK (number 276035) and has no religious affiliations. It focuses on issues that particularly face girls of all ages. Plan International UK works across a range of sectors, including education, health, child protection and participation, economic security and water and sanitation. The organisation's current focus is the promotion of the rights of adolescent girls and disaster response and preparedness. Tanya Barron became Chief Executive of Plan International UK in January 2013 having been International Director at Leonard Cheshire Disability from 2004 to 2012. She holds various trusteeships and is currently a board member of the World Bank's Global Partnership on Disability and Development. In 2003 Barron was given the European Woman of Achievement (Humanitarian) award.

== Merger with Interact Worldwide ==
In 2013, Plan International UK fully merged with the sexual and reproductive health and rights (SRHR) charity Interact Worldwide (formerly known as Population Concern) – a UK-based NGO which works with communities in Africa, Asia and Latin America. The two organisations had entered a part-merger in 2009. Interact's projects relating to maternal health, family planning, HIV & AIDS, as well as other sexual and reproductive issues have been integrated into Plan International UK's work.

== Notable persons affiliated with Plan International UK ==
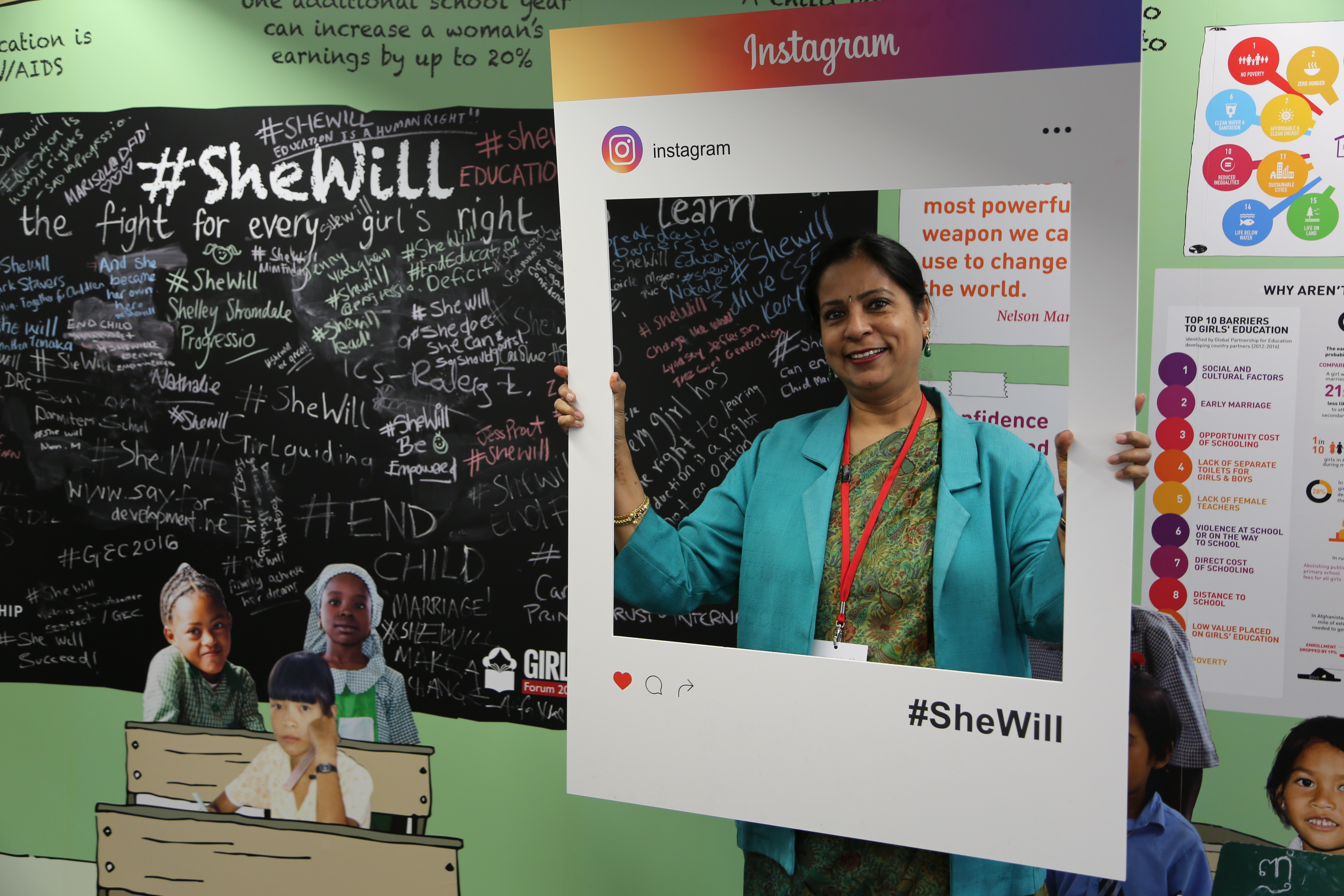
Nazma Kabir, Director of Programmes, 2016

Celebrities who support Plan International UK's work include best-selling author of Brick Lane Monica Ali, soul and R&B singer Beverley Knight and England cricketer Owais Shah. Downton Abbey actress Joanne Froggatt is a Plan International UK Because I am a Girl ambassador.

== Accountability ==
A minimum of 80p in every pound donated to Plan International UK is spent on the organisation's development projects in the countries where it operates. The remainder is spent on fundraising activities and maintaining an international network of support staff.

In 2010, 84p of every pound was spent on development work and 16p on fundraising and administration.

In 2006, Plan International UK was awarded first place in the Charities Aid Foundation's Online Accounts Awards for high quality financial reporting. The awards were presented to charities "whose reports and accounts represent excellence relative to their size."
