= John Salley =

American basketball player (born 1964)

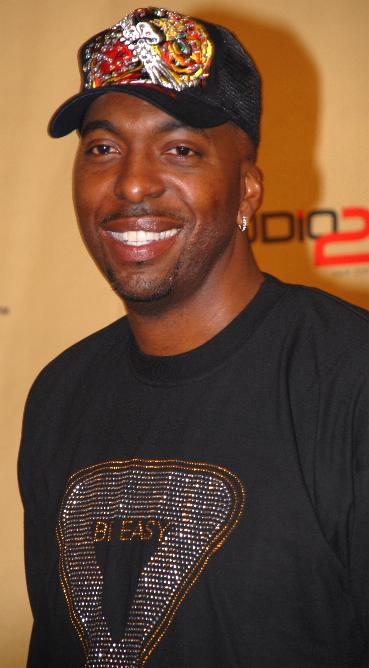
- Salley in 2007

Personal information
- Born: May 16, 1964 (age 62) Brooklyn, New York, U.S.
- Listed height: 6 ft 11 in (2.11 m)
- Listed weight: 255 lb (116 kg)

Career information
- High school: Canarsie (Brooklyn, New York)
- College: Georgia Tech (1982–1986)
- NBA draft: 1986: 1st round, 11th overall pick
- Drafted by: Detroit Pistons
- Playing career: 1986–1996, 1999–2000
- Position: Power forward / center
- Number: 22, 16, 14

Career history
- 1986–1992: Detroit Pistons
- 1992–1995: Miami Heat
- 1995–1996: Toronto Raptors
- 1996: Chicago Bulls
- 1996: Panathinaikos
- 1999–2000: Los Angeles Lakers

Career highlights
- 4× NBA champion (1989, 1990, 1996, 2000); Third-team All-American – NABC (1986); 2× Second-team All-ACC (1985, 1986); No. 22 retired by Georgia Tech Yellow Jackets

Career NBA statistics
- Points: 5,228 (7.0 ppg)
- Rebounds: 3,356 (4.5 rpg)
- Blocks: 983 (1.3 bpg)
- Stats at NBA.com
- Stats at Basketball Reference

John Thomas Salley (/ˈsæli/ SAL-ee; born May 16, 1964) is an American former professional basketball player. He was the first player in NBA history to win championships with three franchises (since joined by Robert Horry, Danny Green, and LeBron James), as well as the first player in the NBA to win a championship in three different decades (since joined by Tim Duncan).

After being drafted in the first round out of Georgia Tech in the 1986 NBA draft, the 6 ft 11 in (2.11 m)-tall Salley played both power forward and center for the Detroit Pistons, Miami Heat, Toronto Raptors, Chicago Bulls, Panathinaikos, and Los Angeles Lakers. He was a long-time host of the former Fox Sports Net show The Best Damn Sports Show Period. He is a vegan activist, chef, and wellness entrepreneur. While playing for the Toronto Raptors in their inaugural season, he met rapper k-os at the MuchMusic Video Awards and later became his manager.

== Early life ==
John Thomas Salley was born on May 16, 1964, in Brooklyn, New York. Salley played on the basketball team at Canarsie High School in Brooklyn.

== College career ==
Salley is a 1988 graduate of Georgia Tech's College of Management. He helped the Yellow Jackets win the 1985 ACC Championship, they also advanced to the Elite Eight of the NCAA Tournament. He left in 1986 as Tech's all-time leader in blocked shots. Salley holds Georgia Tech's personal fouls record, and has had his jersey number 22 retired, a very rare honor in college basketball. Salley was seen as potential top 3 pick during his senior year .

== Professional sports career ==
=== Detroit Pistons (1986–1992) ===
Prior to the 1986 NBA Draft, Salley worked out for the Boston Celtics, who had the 2nd overall pick, against Len Bias and in front of Red Auerbach . The Chicago Bulls promised Salley they would select him with the ninth pick if he were still available, only to select Brad Sellers instead. Salley was ultimately drafted by the Detroit Pistons with the 11th overall pick.

After joining the Pistons, he became close friends with Adrian Dantley, who taught him proper nutrition, how to exercise, and how to conduct himself off the court. Salley, for his part, called Dantley "The Teacher". Salley would become good friends with comedian Eddie Murphy and made several appearances at comedy clubs in the off-season. In 1989 and 1990, he played on two NBA championship teams. He is among the Pistons' all-time leaders in blocked shots.

Under the coaching of Chuck Daly, Salley was part of a Pistons era that featured three consecutive NBA Finals appearances. The team, nicknamed the “Bad Boys” for its highly physical, defense-oriented style of play, included Dennis Rodman, Bill Laimbeer, James Edwards, Joe Dumars, Isiah Thomas, Rick Mahorn and Dantley. After losing the 1988 NBA Finals in seven games to the Lakers, the Pistons rebounded to sweep the Lakers in four games in 1989. Salley and the Pistons repeated in 1990, defeating the Portland Trail Blazers in five games. The Pistons' run came to an end when the Michael Jordan-led Chicago Bulls swept them in four games in the 1991 Eastern Conference finals; following the decisive game, Salley was one of three Piston players to congratulate the Bulls, while the others left the court.

=== Miami Heat (1992–1995) ===
Salley was traded to the Miami Heat in 1992. In the 1995 NBA expansion draft he was selected by the inaugural Toronto Raptors team after being made available by the Heat.

=== Toronto Raptors (1995–1996) ===
In February 1996, he negotiated a buyout of his contract and was waived thus ending his stint with the Raptors during which he averaged 19.3 minutes and 6 points per game.

=== Chicago Bulls (1996) ===
Free of his Raptors contract, in early March 1996, Salley signed a 10-day contract with the Chicago Bulls, joining the roster with Michael Jordan, Scottie Pippen, Toni Kukoč, and former Pistons teammates Dennis Rodman and James Edwards. Following another 10-day contract right after the first one ended, the Bulls signed Salley as a free agent and he spent the rest of the season with the team. The 1995–96 Bulls achieved a record-breaking 72-win season, the best-ever regular-season record at the time, later surpassed by the 2015–16 Golden State Warriors at 73–9. Salley would win his third NBA championship in June, playing sparingly in the 1996 NBA Finals.

=== Panathinaikos (1996) ===
In September 1996, thirty-two-year-old Salley came out of what turned out to be only a three-month retirement and went to play in Greece, where he joined the reigning EuroLeague champions Panathinaikos of the Greek Basket League on a one-year US$1 million contract. Before accepting the Božidar Maljković-coached Panathinaikos' offer, Salley had reportedly consulted with recent Bulls teammate Toni Kukoč who knew Maljković well having spent four trophy-laden seasons anchoring his late 1980s KK Split teams.

Salley made his Panathinaikos debut on September 25, 1996, in EuroLeague away at FC Barcelona, a 77–58 loss during which he scored 5 points before fouling out in only 12 minutes of action. Right away, Salley got on the bad side of coach Maljković who refused to modify his disciplinarian approach in order to accommodate a veteran player with a notable NBA career behind him. Though Salley's performances somewhat improved over the following three EuroLeague outings—10 points in a home loss versus ASVEL, 9 points and 11 rebounds in a blowout home win versus KK Split, and 21 points and 8 rebounds in a win away at minnows Bayer Leverkusen—as he seemingly showed signs of adjustment to FIBA basketball rules and European referees by managing to stay out of foul trouble, he continued to butt heads with coach Maljković. After flying back to Athens with the team the morning after the Leverkusen game, Salley refused to go to practice and as a result, got dropped by Maljković for their Greek League game the following day. The player then flew back to the United States for meetings with TV executives over a new talk show he had been planning to host for Disney, returning to Athens an hour before the club's Greek Cup game versus P.A.O.K. on October 22, 1996—a trip that included Salley renting a private Lear jet in Paris for US$20,000 out of his own pocket in order to make it back to Athens in time for the game after having his connecting flight delayed and then even renting a helicopter once he landed at Athens' Ellinikon Airport to take him right to Panathinaikos' OACA Hall in the city's Marousi neighbourhood. However, Maljković still refused to include him in the lineup. In response, Salley decided to leave Panathinaikos unilaterally two days later on October 24, 1996, after only a month at the club.

Salley appeared in seven games for Panathinaikos and ended up getting paid about €300,000.

=== Los Angeles Lakers (1999–2000) ===
In 1999, Salley joined a Lakers team led by superstars Shaquille O'Neal and Kobe Bryant and also reunited with his former Bulls coach, Phil Jackson, and former Bulls teammate Ron Harper. He saw little action for the Lakers en route to their first of three consecutive NBA championships, primarily serving as O'Neal's backup. In 2000, he retired again following the first Lakers championship season after proudly proclaiming that he had won "four championship rings, with three different teams, in three different decades and two different millenniums". He would be the last Laker to wear #16 before Pau Gasol, whom it was retired in honor of. 14 years later, Tim Duncan of the San Antonio Spurs became the second player to achieve titles in three different decades (sans the requirement of different teams) by leading his Spurs to five championships between 1999 and 2014.

=== ABA Commissioner ===
In 2006, Salley was named the Commissioner of the American Basketball Association.

== Acting, hosting and media appearances ==
Salley has performed in numerous film and TV roles and made appearances as a host and panelist.

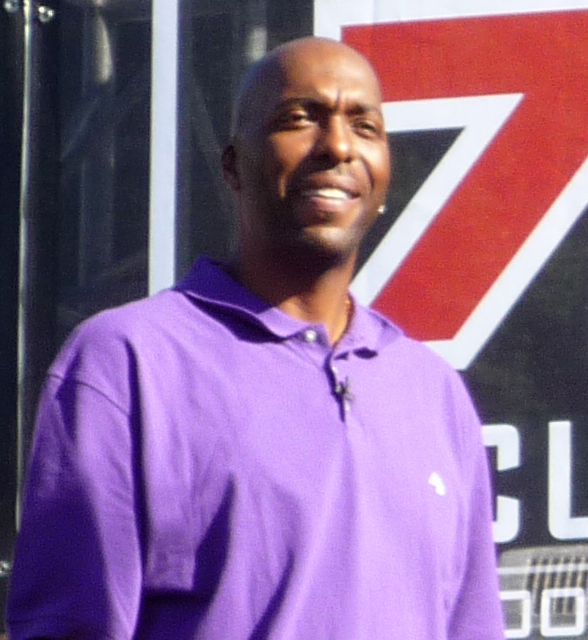
Salley in December 2008 during an electric shaver promotional appearance at the Rose Bowl prior to the UCLA vs. USC college football game.

=== Film ===
- 1995 Bad Boys as Fletcher, a thick-glassed computer hacking nerd prisoner who gets out of jail by helping crack files for the Miami Police Department.
- 1996 Eddie as a veteran basketball player, alongside Whoopi Goldberg. The film is about a fan who takes over as coach of the New York Knicks.
- 2000 The Ultimate Christmas Present as a tall elf named Crumpet. A Disney Channel original movie.
- 2003 Bad Boys II as Fletcher
- 2003 Coast to Coast as Clifford Wordsworth. The film stars Selma Blair and was a Showtime TV film.
- 2009 Confessions of a Shopaholic as a retired NBA player who is a member of shopaholic help group
- 2009 Black Dynamite as a pimp. The film is a blaxploitation spoof.
- 2018 Nappily Ever After as Tyson Edwards. It's a Netflix original film starring Sanaa Lathan.
- 2022 Sneakerella as a famous sneaker maker and former basketball star.
- 2024 Bad Boys: Ride or Die as Fletcher

=== Television (acting) ===
- 1997 Malcolm & Eddie as Lt. Stanley Proctor. Episode: "A Police Officer and a Gentleman" (Season 2, Episode 5)
- 2000 Sabrina the Teenage Witch as himself. Episode: "Welcome Back Duke”. Credited as "NBA player."
- Girlfriends as Byron. Episode: "A Little Romance". (Season 3, Episode 10)
- 2005 Noah's Arc as Victor
- 2019 LA's Finest as Fletcher. The series is a Bad Boys spin-off.
- 2024 Diarra from Detroit, as Tony, a criminal underworld figure who is challenged to a poker game by Diarra in an attempt to pressure him for information. Episode: "All In"
- 2026 Boston Blue as Damon King. Episode: "Personal Foul" (Season 1 Episode 18)

=== Hosting ===
- 1997-1998 NBA Showtime (on NBC), analyst
- 1998 I Can't Believe You Said That, host. The game show aired on the Fox Family Channel.
- 2001 The Best Damn Sports Show Period, host. On Fox Sports Network.
- 2005-2006 The John Salley Block Party, host. A radio morning show on Los Angeles station 100.3 The Beat.
- 2007 Ballers on BET, host. (No relation to the HBO series of the same name.)
- 2010-2012 VH1's Basketball Wives, host
- 2011, 2012, 2014, 2015 Basketball Wives LA, host. Reunion Specials.

=== Other appearances ===
- 1998 Hollywood Squares, Guest-star panelist
- 1998 Match Game, Guest-star panelist
- 2001 Weakest Link, contestant. The contestants were all TV hosts and Salley was voted off in the first round.
- 2001 "Take You Out", a Luther Vandross music video
- 2002 "Entrance", a song from Exit by k-os
- 2004 He's a Lady, celebrity panelist. TBS Superstation.
- 2007 Fast Cars and Superstars: The Gillette Young Guns Celebrity Race, celebrity participant. The ABC reality television series featured a dozen celebrities in a stock car racing competition. In the first round of competition, Salley matched up against professional wrestler John Cena and tennis star Serena Williams.
- 2009 I'm a Celebrity…Get Me out of Here!, cast-member competitor. The reality competition show premiered on June 1, 2009. He came in third place behind winner Lou Diamond Phillips and runner-up Torrie Wilson.
- 2010 Spider and the Henchman podcast, host. With sportswriter Kevin Hench. The podcast was part of Adam Carolla's ACE Broadcasting Network. The show was canceled on March 18, 2011.
- 2012 RuPaul's Drag Race, celebrity judge. Season 4, episode 2.
- 2013 Millionaire Matchmaker on Bravo, guest consultant. Episode: "The NFL Kicker and the Workaholic", aired March 12, 2013. Salley acted as a consultant to Patti Stanger to help one of her clients (an ex-NFL player) become less of a "playa" and find a woman to settle down with.

== Vegan activism and wellness career ==
Salley is a vegan activist. He has appeared on PETA's testimonial videos and has promoted alternatives to massive factory farming. Salley is noted for speaking at Michigan's Vegfest since 2009 and appearing on VegMichigan's billboard campaign. He also appeared before the U.S. Congress to advocate for vegetarian options to be served in public schools in Nov '09 and May '10 as part of the Child Nutrition Act discussions. In December 2015, Salley encouraged US First Lady Michelle Obama to go vegan "for the planet" and set a lifestyle example of reducing environmental impacts from greenhouse gas release.

"Vegan eating is not just a slam dunk for human health; it's also the most effective way to combat climate change." ~ John Salley

On May 4, 2010, it was announced that Salley had joined the Simply Raw team, a show that advocates veganism as a dietary remedy for diabetes. The show has been accused of misrepresentation. The producers of the documentary Raw for 30 had approached Salley with their video about reversing diabetes, and "it instantly got his attention" since his father had the disease. Also in 2010, Salley partnered with Farm Sanctuary to host their New York City Walk for Farm Animals on Sunday, October 24, 2010.

In June 2012 Salley became the official spokesperson for a natural supplements line called VirMax that is developed by Natural Product Solutions, LLC. In 2013 Salley collaborated with Irene's Myomassology Institute as a Keynote speaker of their Holistic Palooza to advocate for health, wellness, and the vegan lifestyle.

Salley is an entrepreneur in the cannabis industry, launching his own cannabis brand Deuces22 and taking an ownership stake in the cannabis testing company GreenSpace Labs. Salley is also an advisory board member with cannabis social networking platform BudTrader.

Salley is an ambassador for Operation Smile.

== Personal life ==
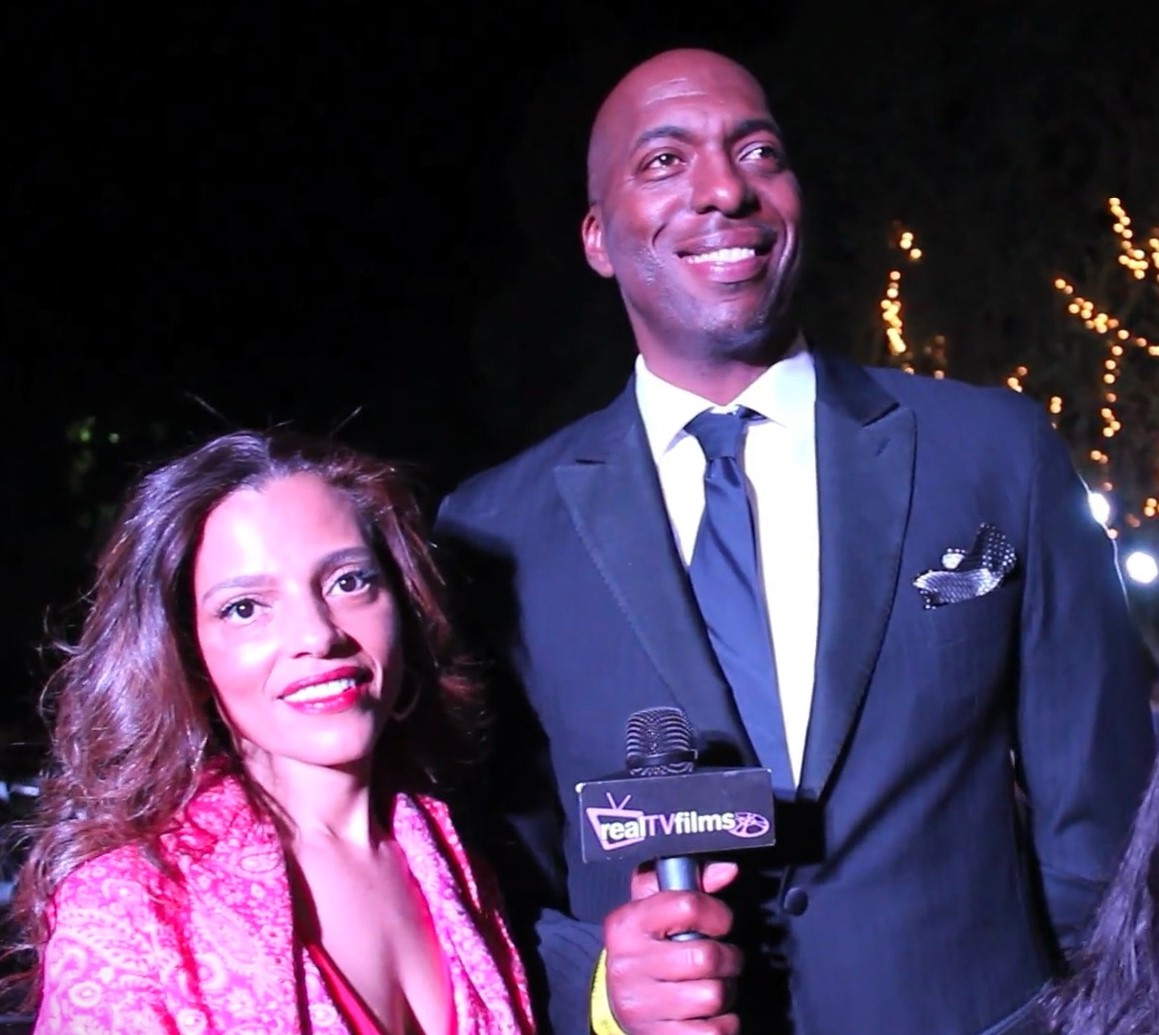
Natasha and John Salley in 2016

Salley married Natasha Duffy in 1993. They have two children together, and Salley also has a daughter from a previous relationship. Salley is a member of Omega Psi Phi initiated through Nu Omega Chapter in Detroit. He is also a 33° Scottish Rite Freemason in Los Angeles.

== NBA career statistics ==
Legend
GP	Games played	GS	Games started	MPG	Minutes per game
FG%	Field goal percentage	3P%	3-point field goal percentage	FT%	Free throw percentage
RPG	Rebounds per game	APG	Assists per game	SPG	Steals per game
BPG	Blocks per game	PPG	Points per game	**Bold**	Career high
†	Won an NBA championship

=== Regular season ===
Year	Team	GP	GS	MPG	FG%	3P%	FT%	RPG	APG	SPG	BPG	PPG
1986–87	Detroit	**82**	2	17.8	.562	.000	.614	3.6	0.7	0.5	1.5	5.3
1987–88	Detroit	**82**	16	24.4	**.566**	–	.709	4.9	1.4	0.6	1.7	8.5
1988–89†	Detroit	67	21	21.8	.498	.000	.692	5.0	1.1	0.6	1.1	7.0
1989–90†	Detroit	**82**	12	23.3	.512	.250	.713	5.4	0.8	0.6	**1.9**	7.2
1990–91	Detroit	74	1	22.3	.475	.000	.727	4.4	0.9	**0.7**	1.5	7.4
1991–92	Detroit	72	38	24.6	.512	.000	.715	4.1	1.6	**0.7**	1.5	**9.5**
1992–93	Miami	51	34	**27.9**	.502	–	**.799**	**6.1**	1.6	0.6	1.4	8.3
1993–94	Miami	76	45	25.1	.477	**.667**	.729	5.4	**1.8**	**0.7**	1.0	7.7
1994–95	Miami	75	**50**	26.1	.499	–	.739	4.5	1.6	0.6	1.1	7.3
1995–96	Toronto	25	6	19.3	.486	–	.723	3.9	1.6	0.4	0.5	6.0
1995–96†	Chicago	17	0	11.2	.343	–	.600	2.5	0.9	0.5	0.9	2.1
1999–00†	L.A. Lakers	45	3	6.7	.362	–	.750	1.4	0.6	0.2	0.3	1.6
Career		748	228	22.1	.506	.214	.714	4.5	1.2	0.6	1.3	7.0

=== Playoffs ===
Year	Team	GP	GS	MPG	FG%	3P%	FT%	RPG	APG	SPG	BPG	PPG
1987	Detroit	15	0	20.7	.500	–	.643	4.8	.7	.2	1.1	6.2
1988	Detroit	**23**	0	27.1	.538	.000	.710	6.7	.9	**.7**	1.6	7.0
1989†	Detroit	17	0	23.1	**.586**	–	.667	4.6	.5	.5	1.5	8.9
1990†	Detroit	20	0	27.4	.475	–	.755	5.9	1.0	.5	1.7	9.5
1991	Detroit	15	0	20.5	.543	–	.600	4.1	.7	.4	1.3	7.5
1992	Detroit	5	1	29.8	.455	.000	**.821**	6.0	**2.8**	.6	**2.8**	**12.6**
1994	Miami	5	**5**	**40.2**	.386	–	.688	**8.0**	1.6	.4	1.0	11.0
1996†	Chicago	16	0	5.3	.545	–	.286	.7	.4	.1	.1	.9
2000†	L.A. Lakers	18	0	4.3	.385	–	.700	1.2	.2	.1	.3	.9
Career		134	6	20.1	.505	.000	.690	4.4	0.8	0.4	1.2	6.4

== See also ==
- List of NBA players with most championships
