= North Cambridge Academy =

Location
- Arbury Road; Cambridge, Cambridgeshire, CB4 2JF; England; 52°13′31″N 0°07′52″E

Information
- Former names: Manor Community College, The Manor
- Type: Secondary School
- Established: 1969
- Trust: Meridian Trust
- Department for Education URN: 139401 Tables
- Ofsted: Reports
- President: Julie Spence
- Chair of Governors: Cllr. Andy Pellew
- Principal: Jane Driver
- Gender: Coeducational
- Age: 11 to 16
- Enrolment: 544
- Houses: Ali (Red), Mandela (Green), Hawking (Blue), Franklin (Yellow)
- Website: https://www.northcambridgeacademy.org/

North Cambridge Academy is a co-educational comprehensive secondary school with academy status, located in the suburb of King's Hedges in Cambridge, England. Founded in 1959 the school was previously known as Manor Community College, and The Manor.

== Partner schools ==
Catchment area primary schools: Shirley Infant and Primary School, Kings Hedges Primary School, The Grove Primary School and Orchard Park Primary School.

North Cambridge Academy is part of the Meridian Trust which encapsulates 31 schools, all within the Cambridgeshire area.

== History ==
The school was built as Manor School around 1959 based on a design by the architects W. Doig and M.R. Francis and, at that time, was a flagship school in Cambridge City. The school was named after Manor Farm which was in the area and was owned by Cambridgeshire County Council, who bought the farm in 1909 from the Benson family of Chesterton hall. The Council split the farm into smallholdings, and the name of one of the smallholders, William Downham, is commemorated in a nearby road called Downham's Lane. The school was due to have funding for refurbishment, but this was removed by Cambridgeshire County Council in 2009. It has recently been selected as part of the Coalition Government's Priority School Building Programme.

=== 1982 arson attack ===
There was a significant arson attack in June 1982.

23 year old Martin Reid, of Nicholas Way, was jailed for seven years on 12 November 1982 for the £400,000 of fire damage at his former schools. Reid had lost his job as a milkman, after a drink driving conviction. His father was Sidney Reid, the Conservative leader of Cambridge City Council. The judge had considered life imprisonment.

=== Academic improvement ===
From the 1990s to the mid 2000s the principal was Mr Cressy. In 2007 the school appointed Ben Slade as principal. In October 2012 Slade resigned in order to take up a post in the independent schools sector. The school improved during his 5-year tenure despite 2012 results being the lowest since he was appointed exacerbated by the national grade boundary change scandal. In 2007 results were 23% 5 higher grades including English and Maths. These rose to 49% in 2010. At 5 higher grades results rose from 32% in 2007 to 60% in 2010 "a remarkable turnaround" (Ofsted, 2010). Martin Campbell was appointed as principal after Slade's resignation.

OfSTED commented that "the changes made are recognised by parents, the vast majority of whom are supportive of the school's work. A considerable number commented on the improvements, including the renewed focus on improving standards. The comment, 'the effort of staff and pupils to make a dramatic improvement is working', is typical."

=== Arts college ===
The Manor was designated as a specialist performing arts college by the DCSF in 2007 and they were successfully re-designated by the DfE in 2010. They were also awarded ArtsMark Gold by the Arts Council for England and the Prince's Teaching Institute Award for English by Prince of Wales in 2009, 2010 and 2011. On 28 November 2012, students from the Manor School performed in front of the Duke and Duchess of Cambridge in an event organised by the Body Gossip education programme.

=== Academy ===
The school became an academy sponsored by the Meridian Trust (known prior as Cambridge Meridian Academies Trust) in September 2013, and was renamed North Cambridge Academy.

In 2020, Martin Campbell became executive head for schools in the Meridian Trust and Samuel Fox became the principal of North Cambridge Academy.
