= Alex George (television personality) =

British doctor and advocate (born 1991)

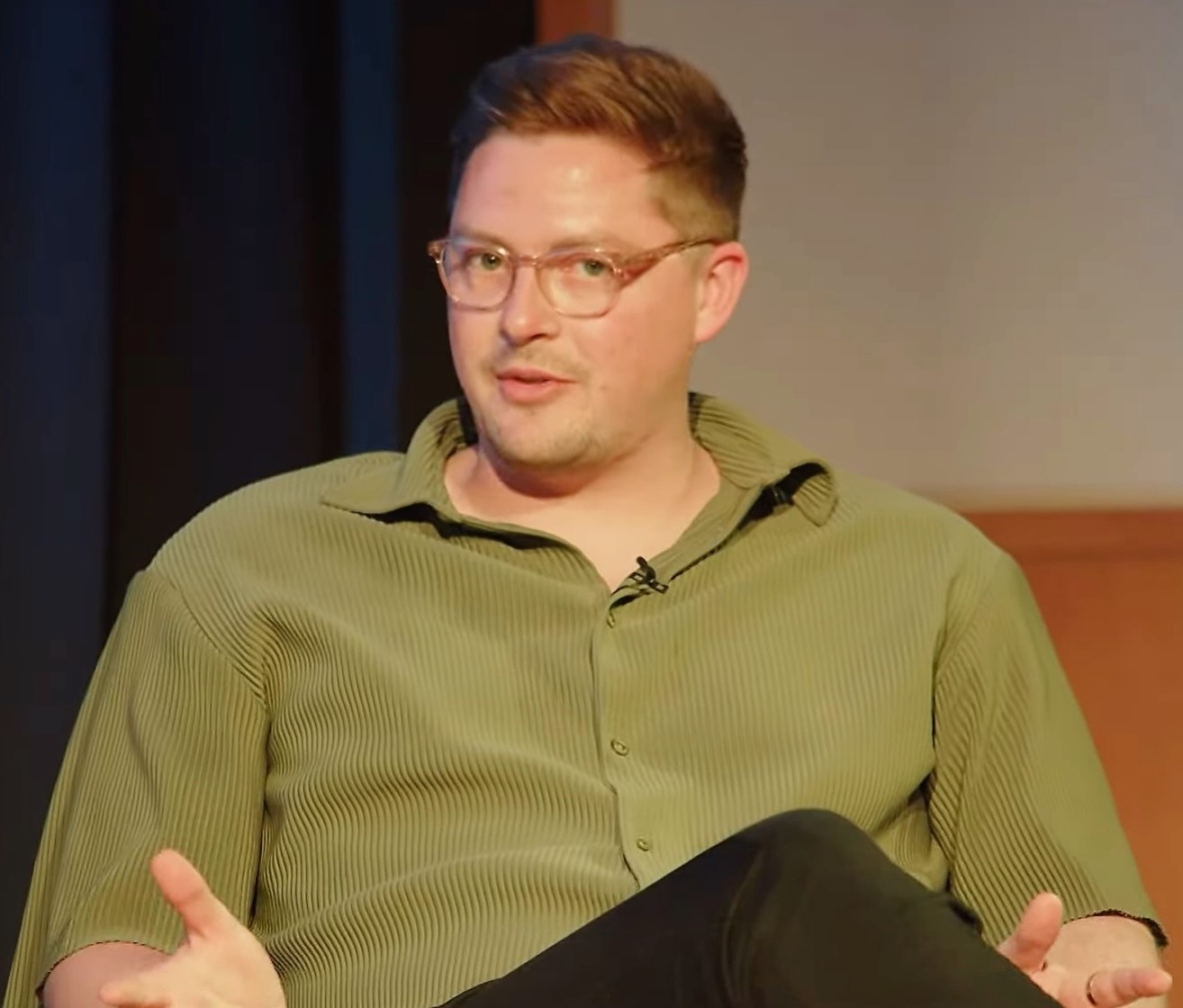
- George at the British Library in 2022

Former UK Youth Mental Health Ambassador
- In office 3 February 2021 – 13 March 2024
- Prime Minister: Boris Johnson; Liz Truss; Rishi Sunak
- Preceded by: Natasha Devon (2016) (Note: Mental Health Champion for Schools)

Personal details
- Born: Alexander David Lloyd George; 15 February 1991 (age 35) Carmarthen, Wales
- Education: University of Exeter; University of Plymouth
- Profession: Physician; television personality

Alexander David Lloyd George (born 15 February 1991) is a Welsh physician and television personality who served as the UK Youth Mental Health Ambassador in the Department for Education. In 2018, he was a contestant on the fourth series of Love Island.

== Early life ==
George grew up in Nantgaredig, a village near Carmarthen, Wales. He is the oldest of three children. George studied medicine at the Peninsula College of Medicine and Dentistry and graduated in 2015. He went on to work in Emergency Medicine at University Hospital Lewisham in London.

== Career ==
In 2018, George appeared in the fourth series of the ITV2 reality dating series Love Island. Following the show, he returned to working part-time at Lewisham whilst also making regular media appearances speaking about mental health on ITV morning shows including Good Morning Britain, Lorraine and Loose Women.

In 2019, George launched the podcast The Waiting Room with Dr Alex, in which he interviews healthcare professionals on topical issues related to health and wellbeing. Notable guests have included surgeon and humanitarian David Nott.

In July 2020, George's youngest brother Llŷr died by suicide. In January 2021, George launched a campaign requesting the UK Government prioritise mental health amongst children and adolescents, especially in light of the COVID-19 pandemic. During Children's Mental Health Week in February 2021, George met with Prime Minister Boris Johnson, who appointed George to the newly created position of Youth Mental Health Ambassador. In addition, George also became a member of the Mental Health in Education Action Group. They will discuss the best way for children to return to education after the COVID-19 pandemic and ensure they receive the support they need.

At his post as Youth Mental Health Ambassador, George worked to improve the support that young people receive regarding their mental health, as well as aided in the shaping and creation of policies to increase the support for students within the education system. George holds a large social media following, which was used to demonstrate the support available whilst working to bring about changes.

In March 2024, George announced on Instagram that the UK Government had ended his voluntary role as Youth Mental Health Ambassador.

In 2021, he joined OnlyFans to post "videos around mental health, self-care and positivity".

In 2022, he purchased four holiday homes in Pembrokeshire to market as holiday lets. After further consideration, he decided to use one of the holiday homes to host a Ukrainian family. After posting this on social media he received criticism, with people saying that he was "tone deaf" for buying the holiday homes amid a shortage of affordable houses for local people in Wales.

George later responded, saying that he was planning to rent one of the holiday homes to locals, after the Ukrainian family would no longer need it. He also said that he would be willing to meet local campaigners on the second homes issue.

George was awarded an honorary doctorate of law on 6 November 2023 by the University of Law in recognition of his work as a Youth Mental Health Ambassador. He was awarded an additional honorary degree by the University of Exeter on 18 July 2024 in recognition of his campaign for extra psychological support for young people.

In 2025, Dr Alex George co-founded DEADCLEAR, an alcohol-free drinks brand, alongside Jack Howson. The company launched its first product, ALLTIME Lager, in November 2026, with the beer becoming available in Waitrose stores.

== Personal life ==
George has been diagnosed as an adult with attention deficit hyperactivity disorder, obsessive–compulsive disorder and autism. He became engaged to his partner via announcement on his personal Instagram page on June 20, 2026.
