= Irene's Myomassology Institute =

American massage school located in Southfield, Michigan

Irene's Myomassology Institute is the oldest and largest massage school in the Midwest. It was founded by Irene Gauthier in 1987 and is located in Southfield, Michigan.

Irene's offers higher education in massage and myomassology, and is a nationally accredited school by the Accrediting Council for Continuing Education & Training. Irene's Myomassology is a school member of a range of organizations including the American Massage Therapy Association (AMTA), Associated Bodywork & Massage Professionals (ABMP), Alliance for Massage Therapy Education, and the National Certification Board for Therapeutic Massage & Bodywork (NCBTMB).

== History ==
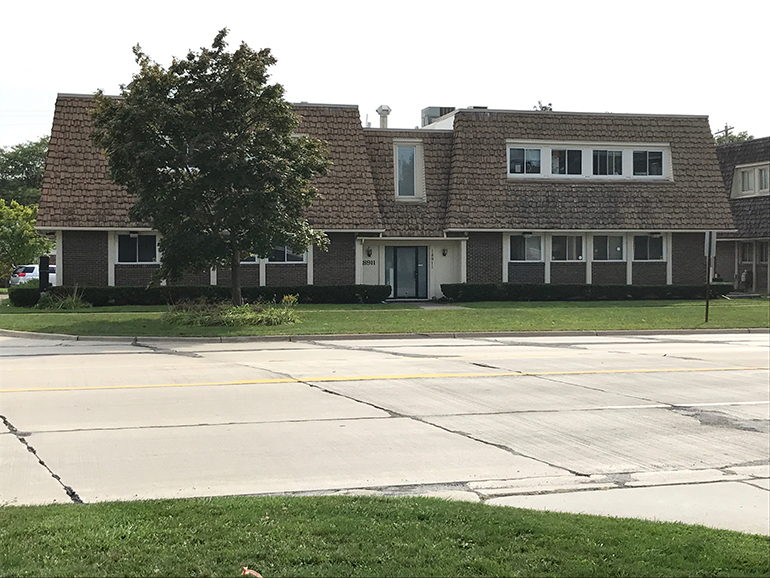
Original site of Irene's Myomassology Institute.

The school was originally known as The Myomassethics Center in 1987 when Irene acquired a commercial state license for the school. This version of the school lasted for 5 years. The name changed to Irene's Myomassology Institute in January 1993 when founder, Irene Gauthier and her daughter, Kathy, opened a location on their own. Located on Ten Mile in Southfield, Michigan, the school started at 3,000 square feet and was expanded multiple times throughout the years. By 1999 the school had expanded to 8,000 square feet, but still needed more space.

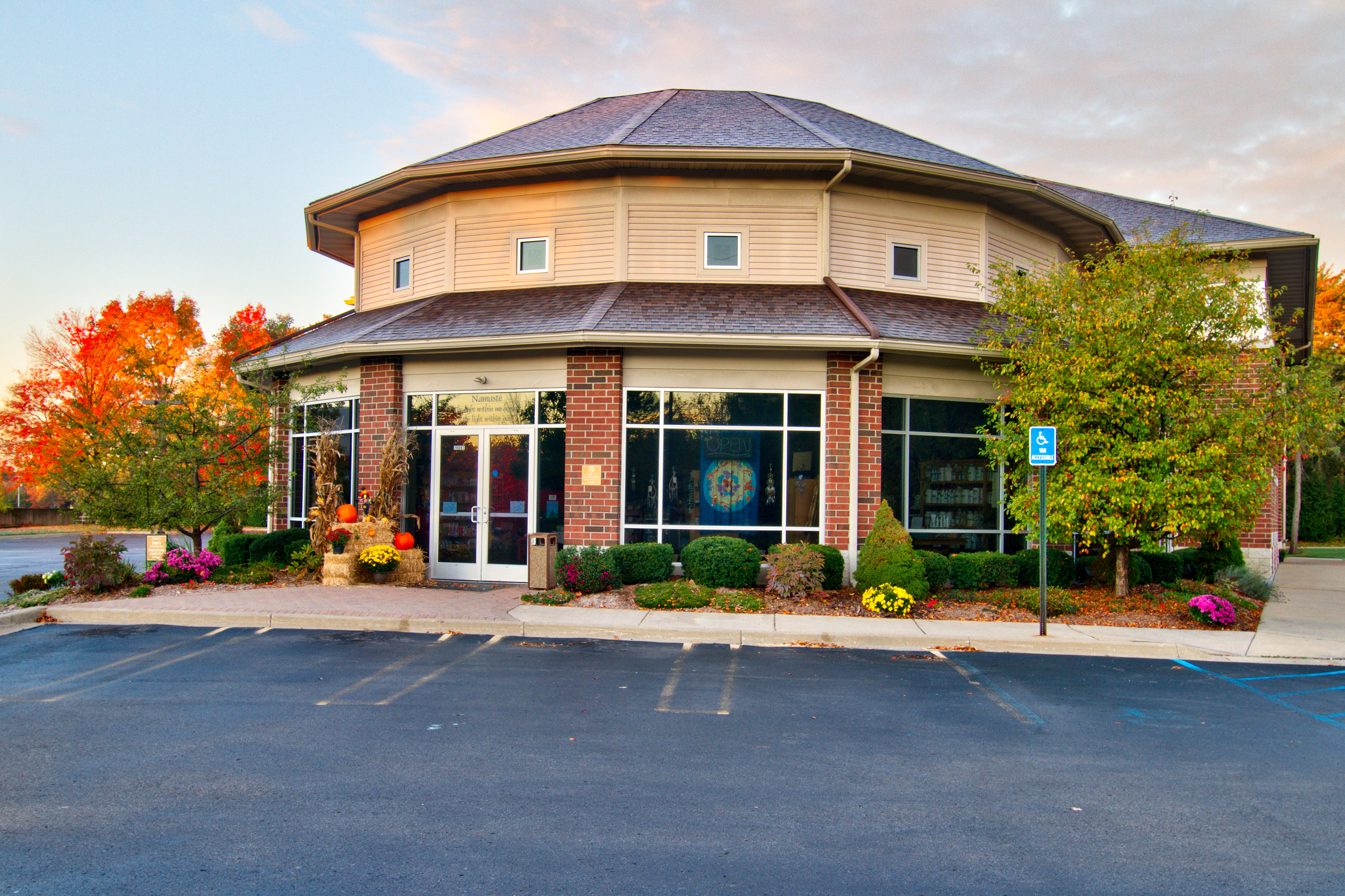
Irene's Myomassology Institute.

In Fall of that year, Irene and Kathy purchased land in Southfield, and had it rezoned for a school. After clearing the land the following spring, they held a ground blessing ceremony to celebrate what would become the new site for the school. A new 17,500 square foot facility opened in May 2001 on Franklin Road. This became the Irene's Myomassology Institute that is known today.

== Charity and community events ==
Irene's Myomassology Institute has been known for its charitable contributions and community events. The school created an annual Massage-a-thon which ran for 9 consecutive years, and raised over $140,000 for the Lighthouse of Oakland County PATH Program, a transitional housing program for homeless women and children.

In 2009, notable contributions included school sponsored care of a lamb at the SASHA Farm, the largest farm animal sanctuary in the Midwest. That same year, Irene's contributed to Walled Lake Western High School's 29th Annual Volleyball Marathon, which helped raise $27,000 for the Muscular Dystrophy Association.

In September 2016, Irene's launched the Kempley Scholarship to assist applicants in need of financial help. The school also annually donates to the Massage Therapy Foundation, to further the scientific study behind massage therapy.

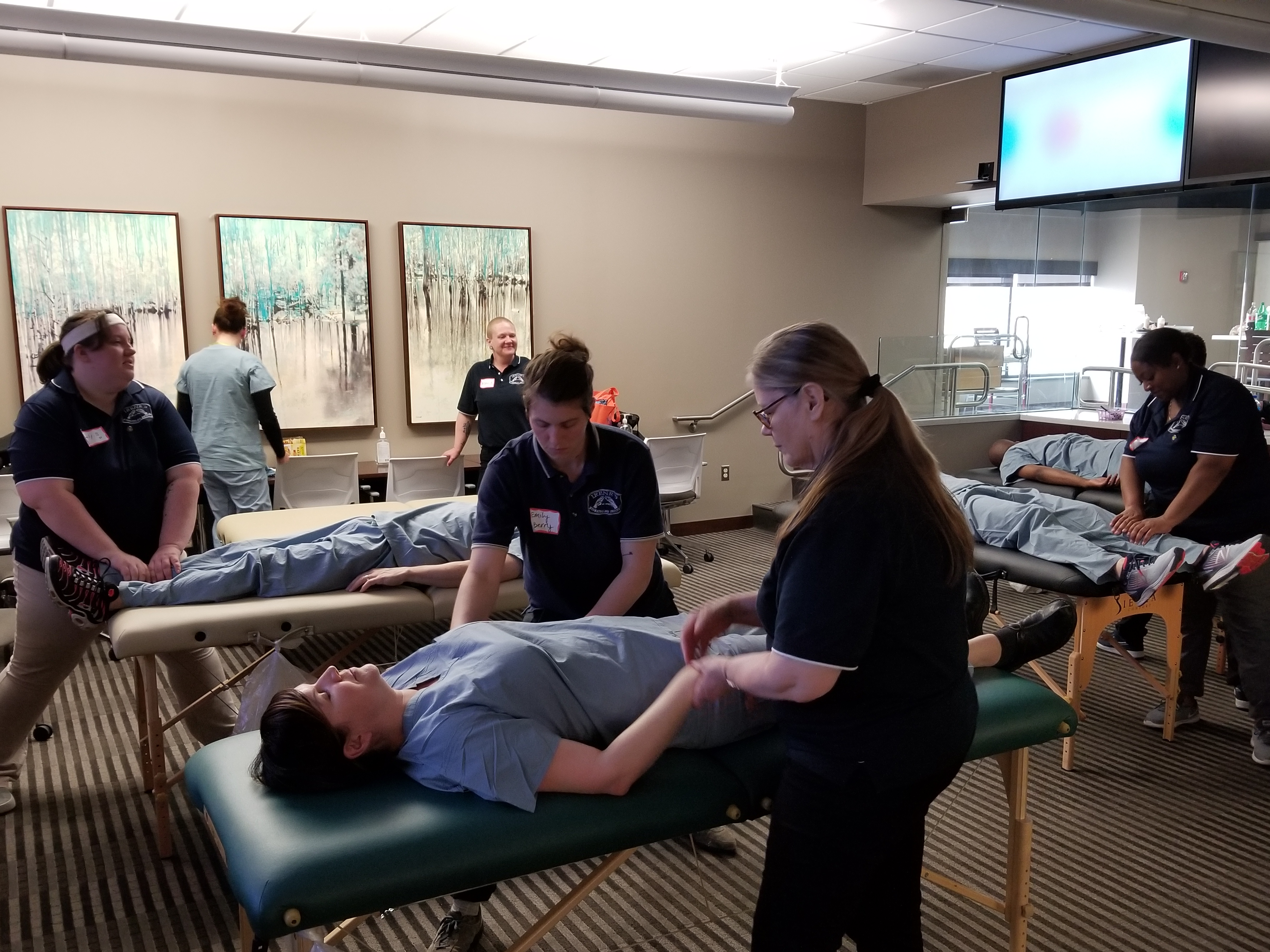
Massage for Nurses Week.

Part of the school's program includes community outreach where students donate massages at charity and community events that align with the school's standards. Common community events include Nurses Week, Wellness Fairs, and Finals Week at Oakland University. Past charity events include Walk for Warmth, Jingle Bell Run, Walk to End Alzheimer's, and the UNCF Detroit Walk for Education.

Irene's Myomassology periodically hosts free holistic health events to help educate the public with informational classes, demos, and hands-on experiences. Topics covered have varied from cancer prevention to healthy weight loss, nutrition to stress management, with massage and yoga as recurring topics. Notable guest speakers have included former NBA player, John Salley, who spoke in length about health, wellness, and the vegan lifestyle.

== Accreditation and awards ==
Irene's Myomassology Institute became accredited in 2002, to coincide with Michigan's implemented state-level school accreditation system. In 2012 the school was the winner of Best of Detroit for Best Massage. In 2013 Irene's Myomassology won two awards; First was Best Massage again, this time by Real Detroit Weekly, now the Detroit Metro Times. The second was Massage School of the Year from the World Massage Festival. A year later, the school won the Excellence in Education award from Massage Envy.
