= Because I Am a Girl =

Gender discrimination awareness movement

Because I Am a Girl is an international movement by the aid organization Plan. The campaign is made to address the issue of gender discrimination around the world. The goal of the campaign is to promote the rights of girls and bring millions of girls out of poverty around the world. It is part of the organization's broader international development work. The campaign focuses on lack of equality faced by girls in developing countries and promotes projects to improve opportunities for girls in education, medical care, family planning, legal rights, and other areas.

== Campaign goals ==
Plan International states that the campaign has several current goals, which in 2012 included:

- Girls' education to be prioritised by world leaders
- Girls' completion of a quality secondary education to be a major focus of international action
- Funding for girls' education to be increased
- An end to child marriage
- An end to gender-based violence in and around schools

Plan has targeted 4 million girls through direct programs and projects, and has the goal of reaching 40 million girls and boys indirectly through gender programs. Plan has a further goal of positively impacting 400 million girls through lobbying for governmental policy changes.

== Origins ==
The campaign began shortly after Plan International published its first annual report on the state of the world's girls in May 2007, titled "Because I am a Girl". The widely cited report, principally written by Nikki Van der Gaag, compiled and analyzed research into the extent of discrimination against girls worldwide and in the developing world in particular. Violence against girls, forced child marriage, endemic poverty, and many other topics were examined. Plan International developed the Because I am a Girl campaign as an ongoing initiative to launch projects aimed at remedying the challenges faced by girls.

== Annual reports ==
Each year, a Because I Am a Girl report is released by Plan as an update on the state of the world's girls. The report has been produced annually since 2007. Researchers for the report visit girls throughout the world and summarize their findings in the report.

Reports released since 2007:

- 2007: The State of World's Girls
- 2008: In the Shadows of War
- 2009: Girls in the Global Economy: Adding It All Up
- 2010: Digital and Urban Frontiers
- 2011: Because I am a Girl: So What About the Boys?
- 2012: Because I am a Girl: Learning for Life
- 2013: In Double Jeopardy: Adolescent Girls and Disasters
- 2014: Pathways to Power: Creating Sustainable Change for Adolescent Girls
- 2015: The Unfinished Business of Girls' Rights

== International activity ==
Plan International has raised awareness of its campaign through innovative marketing, including a highly visible bus stop poster campaign. Plan International also initiated the International Day of the Girl Child, adopted by the United Nations General Assembly as an annual observance day. The inaugural International Day of the Girl Child was October 11, 2012.

Plan International reached 1.1 million kids in the late '90s and as of 2018 it has reached greatly increased to 56.5 million children in more than 50 countries. Plan International's goal is to sponsor kids in impoverished countries so that they have a better chance in life.

Plan International USA seeks to make sure that women and girls can manage their menstruation. There is a lot of stigma and one of the main goals is to provide more knowledge about menstruation to both females and males. Plan also works towards providing more access to sanitary products. #GirlsTakeover is a call for action on International Day of the Girl. In the U.S executive directors of UNICEF, UNWomen, and UNFPA were a part of the takeover and advocated for the equality of girls. More than a thousand takeovers were held in 60 different countries all over the world.

=== Canada ===
Plan Canada's Because I Am a Girl initiative created a petition to the Canadian government for a National Day of the Girl. This petition was designed to lobby the United Nations for an International Day of the Girl, initially to be observed on September 22. The stated goal was to bring international attention and awareness on the issue of gender inequality and allow for girls to obtain their rights. Canada sponsored a resolution in the United Nations General Assembly to observe the International Day of the Girl Child each October 11, a resolution that the UN voted to adopt.

=== United Kingdom ===
In a 2009 campaign, celebrity women donated pictures from their childhood, discussed women who inspired them, and gave their thoughts on human rights.

In 2014, a school girl wrote a poem about forced marriage after discovering the Because I Am a Girl campaign. Her poem was published online by Plan UK.

=== United States ===
In 2015, Mo'ne Davis teamed up with the brand M4D3 (Make A Difference Everyday) to design a line of sneakers for girls, with some of the proceeds going toward the Plan International's Because I Am a Girl campaign.

== See also ==
- Gender inequality
- International development
- Save girls campaign (Beti Bachao)
