= Natasha Devon =

Writer, campaigner and broadcaster

Natasha Devon MBE

Mental Health Champion for Schools
- In office 30 August 2015 – 13 May 2016
- Prime Minister: David Cameron
- Preceded by: Position established
- Succeeded by: Alex George (2021) (Note: UK Youth Mental Health Ambassador)

Personal details
- Born: 12 March 1981 (age 45) Essex, England
- Education: University of Wales, Aberystwyth
- Occupation: Campaigner, writer and social entrepreneur
- Published works: A Beginner's Guide to Being Mental: An A-Z from Anxiety to Zero F**ks Given

Natasha Devon MBE (born 12 March 1981) is a writer, campaigner and broadcaster. She has visited schools and colleges in the United Kingdom and around the world, including in Bangkok, The Hague, Shanghai, Kathmandu, Montreux and Taipei, delivering classes and conducting research with teenagers, teachers and parents on mental health, body image and social equality. She has also taken part in campus wellbeing programmes in British universities including Aberystwyth University and City, University of London, and was a trustee for the student mental health charity Student Minds between 2019 and 2023, although continues to support the charity in an advisory capacity.

Devon has a weekly radio phone-in show on LBC. She began writing a weekly column for the Times Educational Supplement in 2015, but resigned from the newspaper in May 2019 in "solidarity with the trans community" after it published an article recommending a resource to teachers that she described as "transphobic". She currently has a monthly column in Teach Secondary Magazine.

Devon has worked with a number of UK charities and organisations including Body Gossip and Mental Health First Aid England. She is a patron of No Panic, a charity which gives support to people living with anxiety and an ambassador for Glitch, a charity that campaigns for online safety of marginalised groups. In August 2015, the Department for Education appointed Devon as its first mental health champion for schools, but axed the role in May 2016. Devon continues to give regular evidence to the Health and Education Select Committees and is involved in political campaigning.

== Education ==
Devon attended Aberystwyth University.

== Campaigning ==
Devon's personal experience of mental health issues began as a girl, when her panic attacks were misdiagnosed as asthma. Later, aged 17, she developed an eating disorder which she has described as "a (very bad) coping strategy for anxiety".

Devon recovered from bulimia in 2006 and later co-founded the charity Body Gossip with her former school friend Ruth Rogers. At the same time, she began visiting schools to deliver presentations and collect anecdotal evidence from pupils, teachers and parents.

In 2010, Devon wrote an article about her experience of bulimia in the UK edition of Cosmopolitan magazine. After this, she was given a monthly column 'Natasha Devon Wants a Word', for the publication which ran until 2016.

=== Mental Health Media Charter ===
In 2017, Devon launched the Mental Health Media Charter. This is a set of seven simple guidelines for ensuring that imagery and language used in mental health reporting are responsible, genuinely educational and stigma-reducing. The Charter was put together with the help of the Samaritans, Mental Health First Aid (MHFA) England and Beat. It has been endorsed by Girlguiding, the Coalition for Men & Boys & the Labour Campaign for Mental Health.

=== Where's Your Head At ===
In May 2018 (for Mental Health Awareness Week) Devon launched Where’s Your Head At with Mental Health First Aid England and Bauer Media. The campaign calls for a change in the law so that provision for mental health first aid would be mandatory in all British workplaces. The change.org petition gained more than 200k signatures and was delivered by Devon to Downing Street on 8 October 2018. It was debated in parliament in January 2019, and in 2023 recommendation for mental health first aiders in all work places was included in the government’s Suicide Prevention Strategy.

== Mental Health Champion for Schools ==
On 30 August 2015, the Department for Education (DfE) appointed Devon as its first ever mental health champion for schools, as part of a wider £1.25bn drive to improve care. Announcing the decision, Education and Childcare Minister Sam Gyimah said: "Natasha is an inspiration to many young people and I'm delighted to have her on board as our first mental health champion. I know that together we can make a real difference in encouraging more young people to talk openly about mental health". Shortly afterwards, Devon wrote in The Daily Telegraph of her initial caution in accepting the role, adding:

"But then I thought – Why have they picked me? Anyone who's ever watched me on the news knows I'm notorious for being a left-leaning 'gob on a stick'. Surely, if it was tokenism, they'd have selected someone less likely to challenge them? When, during our first meeting the Minister told me that the Government had realised the scale of the problem, they knew they had a responsibility to do something about it and they wanted someone with real experience within the field to advise them, I knew I'd made the right decision."

However, in May 2016 it was announced that Devon's role was to be axed. She was told that her position was discontinued for organisational purposes, to make way for a new interdepartmental role that would be salaried. The decision came days after she had criticised the government's testing regime in schools at the Headmasters and Headmistresses Conference, where she had said: "Time and time again over recent years, young people – and the people who teach them – have spoken out about how a rigorous culture of testing and academic pressure is detrimental to their mental health. At one end of the scale we've got four-year-olds being tested, at the other end of the scale we've got teenagers leaving school and facing the prospect of leaving university with record amounts of debt. Anxiety is the fastest growing illness in under-21s. These things are not a coincidence." The BBC reported that the DfE denied that Devon was being silenced because of her criticism, quoting the department as saying that an 'independent NHS task force report' published in February 2016 had 'recommended that a cross-government mental health champion be created. For this reason we have had to reconsider the department's own role' and that Devon's position was being axed to avoid 'confusion'. Devon emphasised that while she had carried out her role unpaid to maintain her independence of the government, the new appointee would be salaried and could "be paid effectively to toe the party line".

In September 2016, Devon obtained internal DfE emails using a Freedom of Information request. These indicated that despite the department's denials that she was sacked for making public criticisms of government policy, DfE officials were discussing her removal on these grounds months before her position was terminated.

== TV and radio ==
In 2012, Devon was one of the mentors on the Channel 4 TV series Gok's Teens: The Naked Truth. She has also appeared on the BBC, Sky News and ITV as an expert on body image, and on the BBC's Newsnight programme. Other media appearances include Newsround, BBC Radio 4's Woman's Hour, BBC Radio London, and BBC iWonder's Why do I earn less than a man? Between 2011 and 2016, Devon was a regular newspaper reviewer for Sky News' Sunrise. She still occasionally appears on the show.

Along with Dr Keon West of Goldsmiths University, Devon co-presented Naked Beach, an experiment to improve body image through exposure to a range of diverse naked bodies. Series 1 aired on Channel 4 in May 2019.

On 9 September 2020, LBC announced that Devon would be hosting a phone-in show Saturdays at 7pm.

== Publications ==
Devon has written regular columns for publications including Cosmopolitan and TES, (formerly known as the Times Educational Supplement). She has also been published in the Huffington Post, The Independent, The Guardian, and Stylist Magazine.

=== Books ===
Books authored and co-authored by Devon include:

- Rogers, Ruth; Devon, Natasha; Wan, Gok (6 September 2012). Body Gossip: The Book. Rickshaw Publishing. ISBN 978-0956536846.
- Devon, Natasha; Crilly, Lynn (8 January 2015). Fundamentals: A Guide for Parents, Teachers and Carers on Mental Health and Self-Esteem. John Blake Publishing Ltd. ISBN 978-1784181185.
- Devon, Natasha (17 May 2018). A Beginner's Guide to Being Mental: An A-Z from Anxiety to Zero F**ks Given. Bluebird. ISBN 978-1509882229.
- Devon, Natasha (2 April 2020). Yes You Can: Ace Your Exams Without Losing Your Mind. Pan Macmillan. ISBN 978-1529020731.
- Devon, Natasha (7 July 2022). Toxic. UCLan Publishing. ISBN 978-1912979899.
- Devon, Natasha (18 May 2023). Clicks - How to Be Your Best Self Online. Pan Macmmillan Publishing. ISBN 978-1529066630.
- Devon, Natasha (21 September 2023). Babushka. UCLan Publishing. ISBN 978-1915235633.

== Awards ==
In 2012, Devon was Cosmopolitan's 'Ultimate Woman of the Year' and the following year was recognised by Ernst & Young as one of their top 50 Social Entrepreneurs.

Devon was appointed MBE in the 2015 Queen's Birthday Honours in recognition of her "services to young people".

In 2016, Devon was made a Fellow of the University of Wales, Aberystwyth.

Other awards include:

- Shortlist - Hearst 'Big Book' Awards, 2018, for A Beginners Guide to Being Mental
- Longlist - Diverse Book Awards, 2023, for Toxic
- LoveReading4Kids Star Book and Book of the Month October 2023, for Babushka
- DIVA Power List 2024
