= International Day of the Girl Child =

International observance, 11th of October

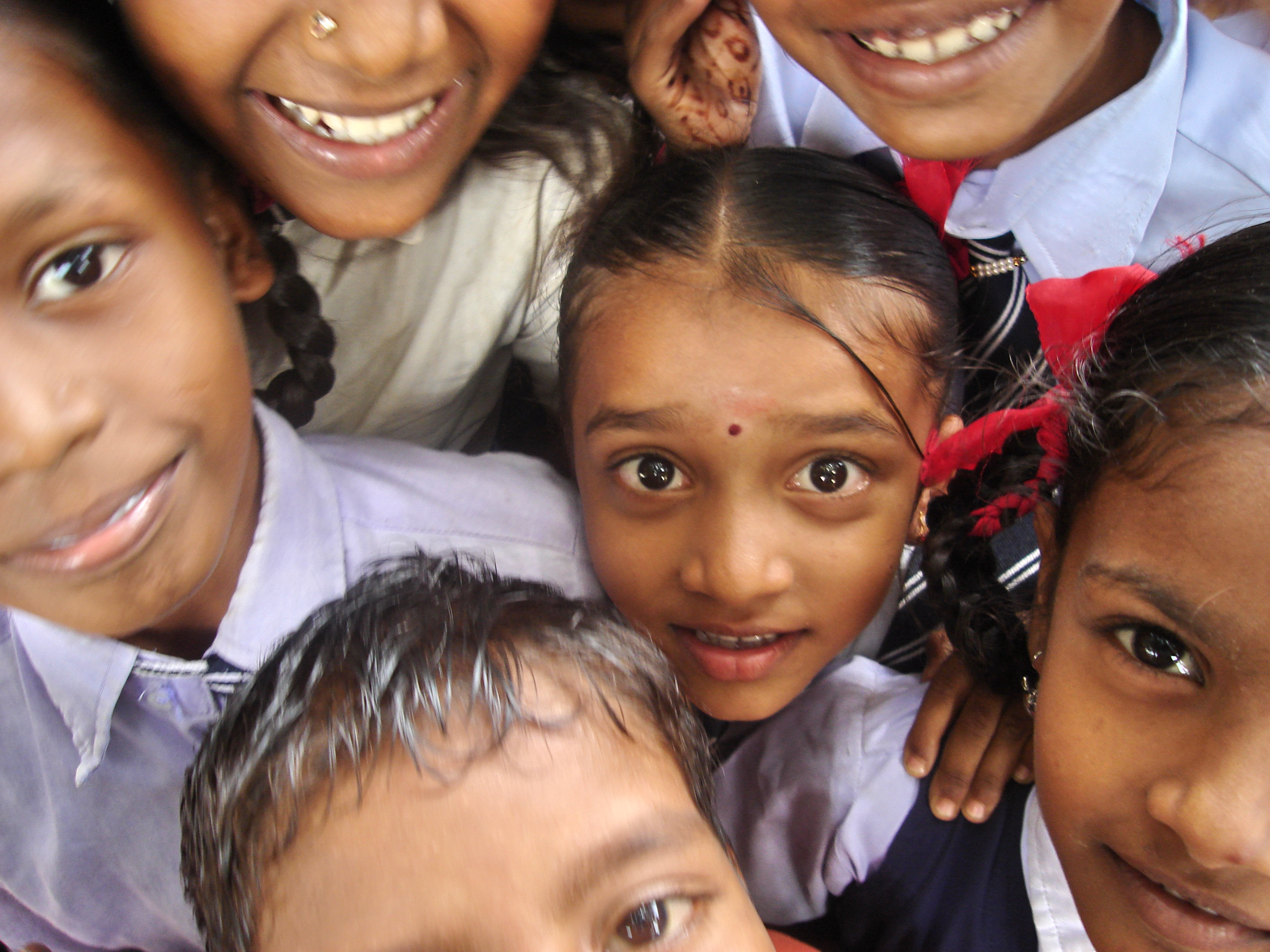
- Also called: International Day of the Girl, Day of Girls, Girl's Day
- Type: International
- Significance: Raising awareness of issues facing girls internationally, such as education, nutrition, forced child marriage, legal rights, and medical rights
- Date: 11 October
- Next time: 11 October 2026
- Frequency: annual
- First time: 11 October 2012

International Day of the Girl Child is an international observance day declared by the United Nations; it is also called the Day of Girls and the International Day of the Girl. October 11, 2012, was the first Day of the Girl Child. The observation supports more opportunity for girls and increases awareness of gender inequality faced by girls worldwide based upon their gender. This inequality includes areas such as access to education, nutrition, legal rights, medical care, and protection from discrimination, violence against women and forced child marriage. The celebration of the day also "reflects the successful emergence of girls and young women as a distinct cohort in development policy, programming, campaigning and research."

== Background ==
International Day of the Girl increases awareness of issues faced by girls around the world. Many global development plans do not include or consider girls, and their issues become "invisible". More than 62 million girls around the world had no access to education, as of c. 2014, according to USAID. Worldwide and collectively, girls ages 5 to 14 spend more than 160 million hours more on household chores than boys of the same age do. Globally, one in four girls are married before age 18. On October 11, 2016, Emma Watson, a United Nations Women's Goodwill Ambassador, urged countries and families worldwide to end forced child marriage. Many girls around the world are vulnerable to acts of sexual violence and the perpetrators often go unpunished.

The Day of Girls helps raise awareness not only of the issues that girls face, but also of what is likely to happen when those problems are solved. For example, educating girls helps reduce the rate of child marriage, disease and helps strengthen the economy by helping girls have access to higher paying jobs.

== History ==
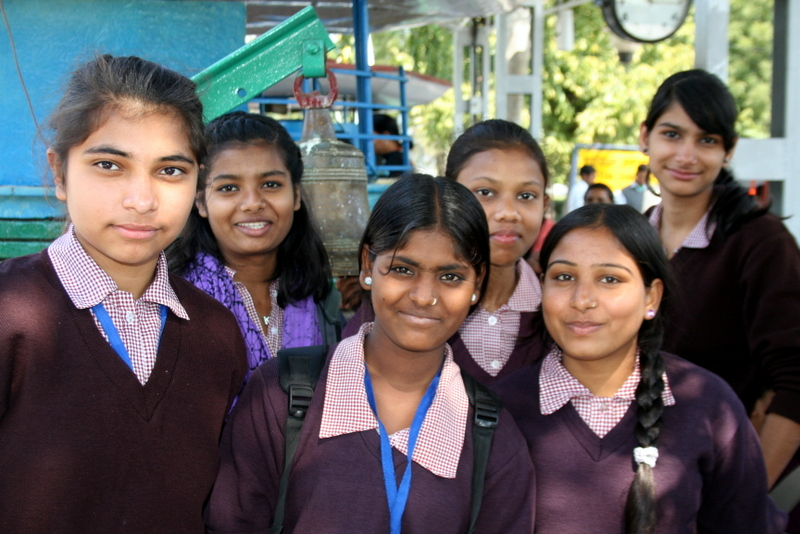
Girls at a 2014 International Day of Girls Event

The International Day of Girls initiative began as a project of Plan International, a non-governmental organization that operates worldwide. The idea for an international day of observance and celebration grew out of Plan International's Because I Am a Girl campaign, which raises awareness of the importance of nurturing girls globally and in developing countries in particular. Plan International representatives in Canada approached the Canadian federal government to seek to the coalition of supporters raised awareness of the initiative internationally. Eventually, Plan International urged the United Nations to become involved.

International Day of Girls was formally proposed as a resolution by Canada in the United Nations General Assembly. Rona Ambrose, Canada's Minister for the Status of Women, sponsored the resolution; a delegation of women and girls made presentations in support of the initiative at the 55th United Nations Commission on the Status of Women. On December 19, 2011, the United Nations General Assembly voted to pass a resolution adopting October 11, 2012 as the inaugural International Day of Girls. The resolution states that the Day of Girls recognizes:

[the] empowerment of and investment in girls, which are critical for economic growth, the achievement of all Millennium Development Goals, including the eradication of poverty and extreme poverty, as well as the meaningful participation of girls in decisions that affect them, are key in breaking the cycle of discrimination and violence and in promoting and protecting the full and effective enjoyment of their human rights, and recognizing also that empowering girls requires their active participation in decision-making processes and the active support and engagement of their parents, legal guardians, families and care providers, as well as boys and men and the wider community [...]

Each year's Day of Girls has a theme -

Theme for the International Day of the Girl Child
Year	Theme
2012	Ending Child Marriage,
2013	Innovating for Girls' Education,
2014	Empowering Adolescent Girls: Ending the Cycle of Violence,
2015	The Power of Adolescent Girl: Vision for 2030
2016	Girls' Progress = Goals' Progress: What Counts for Girls
2017	EmPOWER Girls: Before, during and after crises
2018	With Her: A Skilled Girl Force
2019	GirlForce: Unscripted and Unstoppable
2020	My voice, our equal future
2021	Digital generation. Our generation
2022	Our time is now — Our rights, Our future
2023	Invest in Girls' Rights: Our Leadership, Our Well-being
2024	Girls' vision for the future
2025	The girl I am, the change I lead
2026	End child marriage and invest in girls' rights

By 2013, worldwide, there were around 2,043 events for Day of Girls.

== Events worldwide ==
Various events to promote the Day of Girls are planned in several countries. Some are sponsored by the United Nations, such as a concert in Mumbai, India. Non-governmental organizations, such as Girl Guides Australia, also support events and activities for International Day of Girls. Local organizations have developed their own events, such as Girls and Football South Africa, who, in 2012, distributed T-shirts on International Day of Girls to commemorate the 1956 Black Sash march by 20,000 women. An all-day event was held on London's South Bank in 2013, which included theatre and film performances produced by Body Gossip, an organisation that campaigns on body image and mental health issues. For the first Day of Girls, a virtual event was developed by Sage Girl and iTwixie to bring thousands of individuals and organizations together online.

In 2016, London held a Women of the World (WOW) festival where 250 London school-aged girls were paired with women mentors. Also in 2016, the President of the United States, Barack Obama, issued a proclamation supporting an end to gender disparity.

Social media uses the hashtag #dayofthegirl to track events and news about the day.

== See also ==
- International Day of the Boy Child
- Child marriage
- Girl
- Gender equality
- Hinamatsuri
- International Day of Women and Girls in Science
- International Women's Day
- International development

== Bibliography ==
- UN (2015). "International Day of the Girl Child October 11". Department of Public Information, UN.
