= Plan USA =

US-based nonprofit organization

Plan International USA
- Founded: 1937; 89 years ago (as Foster Parents Plan for Children in Spain)
- Founders: John Langdon-Davies; Eric Muggeridge
- Type: 501(c)(3) charitable organization
- Purpose: Girls' rights, child poverty, global development, humanitarian assistance
- Location: Providence, Rhode Island, Washington, D.C.
- Region served: More than 75 countries in Asia, Europe, the Americas, and Middle East
- Key people: John Langdon-Davies, Laurie Metcalf, Tessie San Martin
- Revenue: US$ 68.2 Million (2021)
- Employees: 139
- Website: planusa.org

Plan International USA (Plan) is an international development and humanitarian nonprofit organization works on programs related to children's rights and gender equality focused on girls and their communities. It is part of Plan International, a global nonprofit federation that works on poverty reduction programs in collaboration with communities, organizations and governments.

== History ==
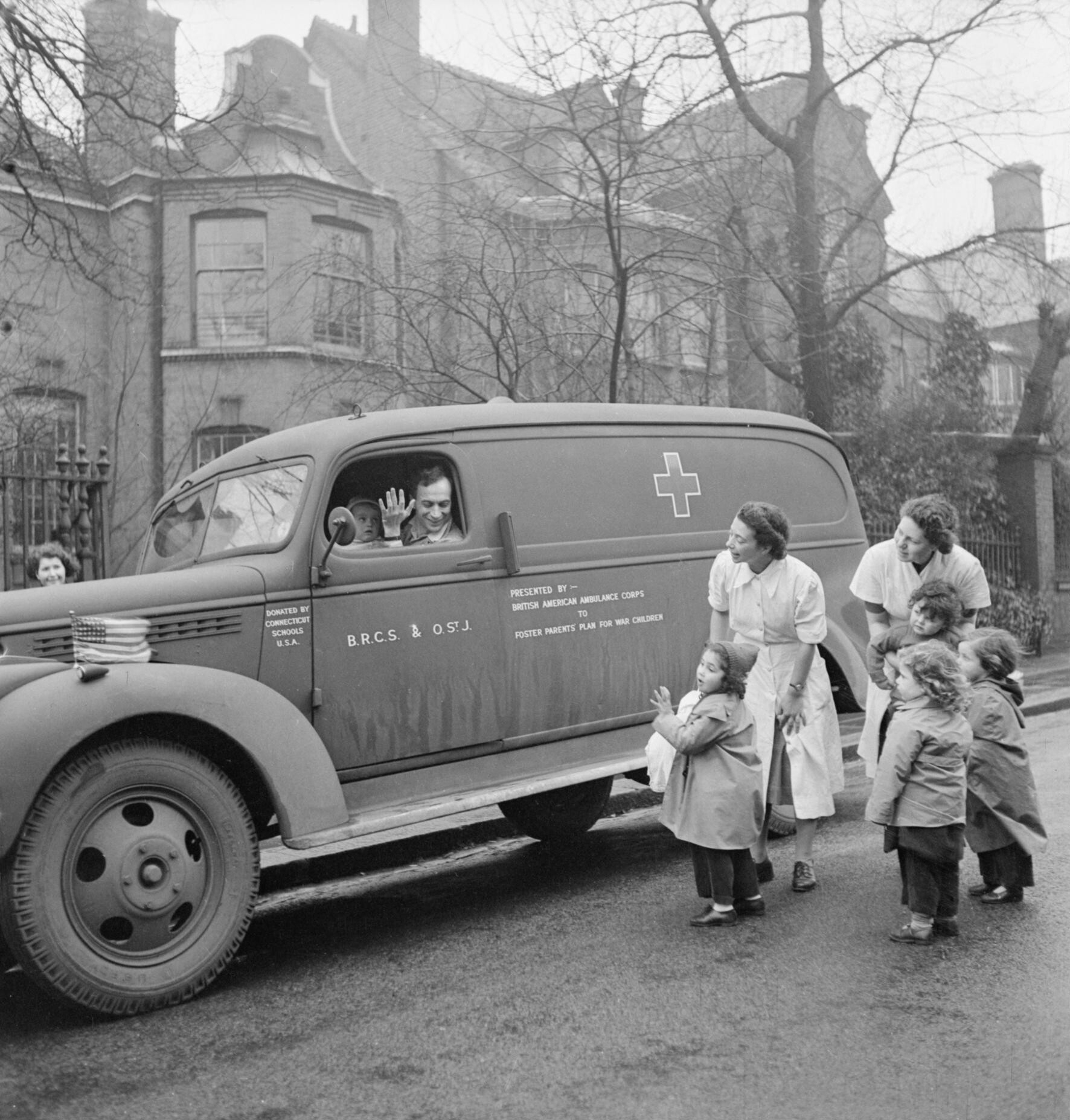
Eric Muggeridge leaves a Nursery in Hampstead, London, in 1941.

Plan was founded in 1937 by British journalist John Langdon-Davies and refugee worker Eric Muggeridge. Originally named "Foster Parents Plan for Children in Spain", it aimed to provide food, accommodation, and education to children affected by the Spanish Civil War. During the Second World War, as "Foster Parents Plan for War Children", it worked with displaced children in parts of Europe affected by the war. By the 1970s, it had started working with children in Africa, Asia, Latin America, and the Caribbean.

Plan International USA was originally incorporated as "Foster Parents Plan, Inc." in 1939 in New York to connect U.S. donors to sponsored children in other countries. It was one of the first Plan International federation members. Its programs are implemented in more than 50 countries.

In 1974, the international parent organization, Foster Parents Plan shortened its name to "Plan International". In the 1990s the U.S. organization followed suit, changing its name "Childreach/Plan International" and eventually to "Plan International USA".

== Finances and structure ==
Plan International USA is an American non-profit charitable organization, deriving its income from a combination of individual contributions and private and federal grants. The total operating revenue in 2024 for the organization was approximately $58.6 million. The headquarters are located in Providence, Rhode Island.

Shanna Marzilli was named President & CEO in January 2023. She succeeded Mustafa Kudrati for 10 months and Dr. Tessie San Martin, who served for 11 years and stepped down in 2021. The Plan USA Youth Advisory Board is a youth-led group that advises the organization on projects and participates in events. It runs the annual Youth Leadership Academy, a yearlong program focused on training and supporting young participants.

== Campaigns and reports ==
Because I Am a Girl was an international campaign addressing gender discrimination. Its goal was to support girls' rights and bring millions of girls out of poverty around the world, promoting projects to improve opportunities for girls in education, health care, family planning, legal rights, and other areas.

In September 2018, the organization released "The State of Gender Equality for U.S. Adolescents". The report received coverage in media including the New York Times, Washington Post, and Forbes. It reported how adolescents in the U.S. think about gender equality and what shapes those views. The report was named Media Relations campaign of the year by PR Daily.

In August 2019, the organization announced a major donation. The gift will fund a program model called GirlEngage, which aims to address social and gender norms, send more girls to school and work to keep girls safe in their communities. This approach amplifies the voices of vulnerable and marginalized girls by including them in all stages of a project life-cycle – from defining the problem through program evaluation.

In October 2022, Plan USA's We Are the Girls campaign launched in the U.S. to address gender inequality domestically and around the world. The campaign aimed to promote girls' leadership to address gender inequality and fight its root causes through girl-led projects related to education, health, protection, youth equality and economic empowerment. During its run, the campaign partnered with Unsplash, Z100 and UNIQLO to support Plan's $200 million goal and encourage people to sign the We Are the Girls pledge.

== Programs ==
In coordination with Plan International and its other chapters, Plan International USA supported the following programs and activities in 2024:

- 43 million children supported through Plan's work.
- 1.1 million children sponsored.
- Partnered with 36,367 organizations.
- Worked in 66,875 communities across 80+ countries.
- Reached 17.8 million children and adults with education programs, including access for 5.3 million girls.
- Implemented 87 disaster response programs, supporting 3.2 million girls.

=== Child sponsorship ===
Plan's child sponsorship program links each sponsor to an individual child in countries where Plan International has sponsorship programming. Sponsors contribute money and have an opportunity to correspond with the child and his or her family. Donations are not given directly to the child but are used to support community programs.

New York Times columnist Nicholas Kristof visited a child he sponsored in the Dominican Republic, a trip he wrote about in one of his columns while pointing out the benefits of child sponsorship programs.

The effectiveness of the program was studied by RMIT University through an analysis "Changing Lives: An Analysis of Child Sponsorship Data". It reviewed survey data from millions of sponsored children over several years and reported finding that more children attend school in sponsored communities than in non-sponsored communities, that school attendance rises every year the program works in a community and most children have greater access to improved water and sanitation.

== In popular culture ==
The organization was featured in the 2002 film About Schmidt and Girl Rising in 2013. The organization is also featured in the book Half the Sky: Turning Oppression into Opportunity for Women Worldwide by Nicholas Kristof and Sheryl WuDunn, published in 2009.
