= Do Your Ears Hang Low? =

Children's song derived from an 1838 popular song

Song
- Language: English
- Genre: Children's song; novelty song
- Songwriter: Traditional
- Composer: Traditional

"Do Your Ears Hang Low?" is a children's novelty song often sung at camps. The melody of this song is usually a shorter version of an American folk song "Turkey in the Straw", but it can also be sung to the tune of the "Sailor's Hornpipe". It has a Roud Folk Song Index number of 15472.

== History ==
The origin of the song is most likely George Washington Dixon's "Zip Coon", penned in 1838. Variant versions with vulgar lyrics include "Do Your Balls Hang Low?" and "Do Your Boobs Hang Low?". Some authors regard these as parody versions of the campfire song, but, according to folklorists such as Ed Cray, the evidence strongly suggests that "Do Your Balls Hang Low?" came first, and that "Do Your Ears Hang Low?" is a sanitized version.

The earliest apparent report of "Do Your Balls Hang Low?" is said to date from about 1900. The song is known to have been sung by British soldiers on the Western Front during the First World War. Lyn MacDonald reports that, on one occasion in 1916, General Douglas Haig heard it being sung by a column of soldiers as they marched past on their way to the Somme. He immediately called for his horse and rode to the head of the column to remonstrate with the battalion commander, only to find the colonel singing as heartily as his men. Haig congratulated him on his fine voice, but added: "I like the tune, but you must know that in any circumstances those words are inexcusable!"

== Lyrics ==
The following lyrics are from one particular variant of the song:

Do your ears hang low?
Do they wobble to and fro?
Can you tie 'em in a knot?
Can you tie 'em in a bow?
Can you throw 'em o'er your shoulder
Like a continental soldier?
Do your ears hang low?

Do your ears hang high?
Do they reach up to the sky?
Do they dangle when they're wet?
Do they straighten when they're dry?
Can you wave them at your neighbor
With an element of flavor?
Do your ears hang high?

Do your ears flip-flop?
Can you use them as a mop?
Are they stringy at the bottom?
Are they curly at the top?
Can you use them for a swatter?
Can you use them for a blotter?
Do your ears flip-flop?

Do your ears stick out?
Can you waggle them about?
Can you flap them up and down
As you fly around the town?
Can you shut them up for sure
When you hear an awful bore?
Do your ears stick out?

Do your ears give snacks?
Are they all filled up with wax?
Do you eat it in the morning
Do you eat it in the bath?
Do you eat it with a scone
Or do you eat it on its own?
Do your ears give snacks?

In the United Kingdom and Australia, a shorter version with differences in the lyrics is heard, commonly sung in Cubs and Brownies events:

Do your ears hang low?
Do they wobble to and fro?
Can you tie them in a knot?
Can you tie them in a bow?
Can you swing them over your shoulder like a regimental soldier?
Do your ears hang low?

Another verse of this variant, though not usually sung in Cubs and Brownies events, is as follows:

Do your ears hang high?
Do they point up in the sky?
Do they hang down when they’re wet?
Do they stick up when they’re dry?
Can you semaphore your neighbour with a minimum of labour?
Do your ears hang high?

=== Soldiers' version ===
The lyrics of the World War I version of "Do Your Balls Hang Low?" are recorded as:

Do your balls hang low?
Do they dangle to and fro?
Can you tie them in a knot?
Can you tie them in a bow?

Do they itch when it's hot?
Do you rest them in a pot?

Do you get them in a tangle?
Do you catch them in a mangle?
Do they swing in stormy weather?
Do they tickle with a feather?

Do they rattle when you walk?
Do they jingle when you talk?

Can you sling them on your shoulder
Like a lousy fucking soldier?
Do your balls hang low?

== Recorded versions ==
- Sung by the Kidsongs Kids in A Day With The Animals 1986
- Sharon, Lois & Bram on Stay Tuned 1987
- Kinky Friedman on Live from Uranus 2003
- Øystein Sunde in a Norwegian variant called Hvis dine ører henger ned ("If your ears hang down") on Det året det var så bratt 1971
- The title, chorus, and melody of the chorus of the Jibbs song "Chain Hang Low" are based on this song.
- The vocal melody of this song is used in verses of "Minna ga Minna Eiyū" (みんながみんな英雄) by Japanese-American singer Ai.
- British comedy musician Koit has recorded more than one version:- Do Your Balls Hang Low and Do Your Balls Hang Low (English Country Garden Mix) on his third album Songs To Take A Dump To; and Do Your Boobs Hang Low on his sixth album Bog Roll Needed.

=== On film ===
- In Easy Rider (1969), a mime troupe at the commune sings "Does Your Hair Hang Low?" while taunting Dennis Hopper's character Billy.

=== On television ===
- In the ears episode of Elmo's World (Sesame Street), a Muppet elephant sings the song during his video e-mail to Elmo.
- Sung in many episodes of Barney & Friends and an episode of Barney & The Backyard Gang
