= Go Too Far =

Single by Jibbs featuring Melody Thornton

from the album Jibbs Featuring Jibbs
- Released: January 13, 2007
- Recorded: 2006
- Genre: Hip hop, R&B
- Length: 3:55
- Label: Geffen Records
- Songwriters: Terry Lewis, Melanie Andrews, Janet Jackson
- Producer: The Beatstaz

Jibbs singles chronology
"King Kong" (2006)	"Go Too Far" (2007)	"Smile" (2007)

Melody Thornton singles chronology
"Go Too Far" (2007)	"Sweet Vendetta" (2011)

Music video
- "Go Too Far" on YouTube

"Go Too Far" is a song by American rapper Jibbs featuring former The Pussycat Dolls member Melody Thornton. It is released on January 13, 2007, as the third single from Jibbs' debut studio album Jibbs Featuring Jibbs. The song samples Janet Jackson's "Let's Wait Awhile". The song was written by Jackson, Melanie Andrews, and Terry Lewis.

== Critical reception ==
"Go Too Far" received generally positive reception from music critics. David Jeffries of Allmusic described it as "sugary sweet", and the song is considered one of the a highlights of the album. Chuck Campbell of Scripps Howard News Service called the song "wimpy".

== Music video ==
The music video was directed by Meiert Avis and shows Jibbs and Melody Thornton having a day out in Venice Beach. Former Girlicious member Tiffanie Anderson makes an appearance in the video.

== Charts ==
Chart (2007)	Peak position
New Zealand (Recorded Music NZ)	17
UK Singles (OCC)	126
