= Jibbs Featuring Jibbs =

2006 studio album by Gibbs

Jibbs feat. Jibbs

Studio album by Jibbs
- Released: October 24, 2006
- Recorded: 2005–06
- Genre: Hip hop
- Length: 42:44
- Label: Geffen
- Producer: Da Beatstaz (exec.); Zaytoven; David Banner; Polow da Don; Vaushaun "Maestro" Brooks; Dr. Luke

Singles from Jibbs feat. Jibbs
- 1. "Chain Hang Low" Released: June 20, 2006; 2. "King Kong" Released: December 27, 2006; 3. "Go Too Far" Released: January 13, 2007; 4. "Smile" Released: March 8, 2007

Jibbs feat. Jibbs is the only studio album by St. Louis, Missouri rapper Jibbs. It was released on October 24, 2006. The album is produced by Da Beatstaz, David Banner, Polow da Don, and Maestro, and includes performances by Chamillionaire, Melody Thornton of Pussycat Dolls and Fabo of D4L. The first single was "Chain Hang Low", the second was "King Kong", the third was "Go Too Far", and the fourth and final single was "Smile".

The record was met with mixed reception from music critics. Jibbs featuring Jibbs debuted at number 11 on the Billboard 200, with about 50,000 copies sold in its first week. It also debuted at numbers four and eight on both the Rap Albums and R&B/Hip-Hop Albums charts respectively. The album went on to sell over 125,000 copies in the United States.

== Critical reception ==
Professional ratings
Review scores
Source	Rating
AllMusic	3.5/5 stars
Entertainment Weekly	C+
Prefix	1.0/10.0
RapReviews	6/10

AllMusic editor David Jeffries noticed the similarities to fellow St. Louis rappers Nelly and Chingy but found the album to be styled like "an LL Cool J release for the '80s." He concluded with: "Good flow, good beats, and overall, a good time." Entertainment Weekly's Michael Endelman commended Jibbs for displaying potential as a rapper but felt that he spends "most of the disc trying out too many different styles — from slow-rolling Houston grooves to Nelly-style pop-rap — instead of defining a sound of his own." Steve 'Flash' Juon of RapReviews found his performance to be average with rhymes that were "acceptable albeit entirely generic and run of the mill." He also said that the production from Da Beatstaz helped save the album and that it should be retitled "Da Beatstaz Feat. Jibbs." He concluded that: "Jibbs Feat. Jibbs is not an altogether bad album, but really does nothing to put Jibbs on the map. You could easily substitute any one of a dozen rappers in or outside St. Louis over these tracks and get the same result - anybody from Ali to Cool Breeze to Bubba Sparxxx."

== Track listing ==
No.	Title	Producer(s)	Length
1.	"Yeah Boii"	David Banner	3:59
2.	"Smile" (featuring Fabo)	Da Beatstaz	3:27
3.	"Chain Hang Low"	Da Beatstaz	3:31
4.	"Big Big Kid"	Da Beatstaz	3:27
5.	"Let's Be Real" (featuring J. Valentine)	Polow da Don; Elvis Williams (co.)	3:52
6.	"King Kong" (featuring Chamillionaire)	Da Beatstaz; Pretty Boy & Bradd Young (co.)	4:35
7.	"Hood"	Da Beatstaz	2:57
8.	"Go Gurl"	Da Beatstaz	2:42
9.	"Go Too Far" (featuring Melody Thornton)	Da Beatstaz	3:55
10.	"I'm a Rhino"	Da Beatstaz	4:33
11.	"Bring It Back"	Polow da Don	3:22
12.	"Firr Az That Thang"	Dr. Luke; Da Beatstaz (co.)	3:24

• (co.) Co-producer

== Charts ==
Chart (2006)	Peak position
US Billboard 200	11
US Top R&B/Hip-Hop Albums (Billboard)	8
US Top Rap Albums (Billboard)	4

== Personnel ==
#	Title	Notes
1	"Yeah Boii"	Songwriters: Jovan Campbell, Lavell Crump, Jimmy Webb; Intro vocals: David Banner; Recording: Sean Tallman (The Boom Boom Room, Burbank, CA); Mixing: Leslie Braithwaite (Patchwerk Studios, Atlanta, GA); Assistant mix engineer: Kori Anders; Project coordinator: Liz Garner; Sample: "Orange Air" by The 5th Dimension
2	"Smile"	Songwriters: Jovan Campbell, Lafabian Williams, Derryl Howard, Maurice Wilson; Recording: DJ Beats and Reace Beats (The Basement, St. Louis, MO); Mixing: Phil Tan (Soapbox Studios, Atlanta, GA); Assistant mix engineers: Josh Houghkirk, Aaron Holton
3	"Chain Hang Low"	Songwriters: Jovan Campbell, Derryl Howard, Maurice Wilson, Antwain Elliott, Lamont McLendon; Recording: Chris Robinson (Phat Buddah Studios, St. Louis, MO); Mixing: Phil Tan (Doppler Studios, Atlanta, GA); Assistant mix engineers: Josh Houghkirk, Aaron Holton
4	"Big Big Kid"	Songwriters: Jovan Campbell, Derryl Howard, Maurice Wilson; Recording: DJ Beats and Reace Beats (The Basement, St. Louis, MO); Mixing: Phil Tan (Doppler Studios, Atlanta, GA); Assistant mix engineers: Josh Houghkirk, Aaron Holton
5	"Let's Be Real"	Songwriters: Jovan Campbell, Jamal Jones, Elvis Williams; Additional vocals: Jay Valentine; Guitar: Mike Hartnett; Keyboards: Elvis Williams; Recording: Ethan Willoughby (The Lair, Los Angeles, CA), Tony Terrebone (Chalice Studios, Los Angeles, CA), Jason Schweitzer (Zac, Los Angeles, CA); Mixing: Phil Tan (Soapbox Studios, Atlanta, GA); Assistant mix engineers: Josh Houghkirk, Aaron Holton
6	"King Kong"	Songwriters: Jovan Campbell, Derryl Howard, Maurice Wilson, Orlando Watson, Bradford Ray; Recording: DJ Beats and Reace Beats (The Closet, Los Angeles, CA); Chamillionaire vocals: Larrabee Sound Studios, Los Angeles, CA; Mixing: Leslie Braithwaite (Patchwerk Studios, Atlanta, GA); Assistant mix engineer: Kori Anders
7	"Hood"	Songwriters: Jovan Campbell, Derryl Howard, Maurice Wilson; Recording: DJ Beats and Reace Beats (The Basement, St Louis, MO); Mixing: Phil Tan (Soapbox Studios, Atlanta, GA); Assistant mix engineers: Josh Houghkirk, Aaron Holton
8	"Go Gurl"	Songwriters: Jovan Campbell, Derryl Howard, Maurice Wilson; Recording: DJ Beats and Reace Beats (The Basement, St. Louis, MO); Mixing: Kevin "KD" Davis (The Boom Boom Room, Burbank, CA); Additional engineering: Sean Tallman
9	"Go Too Far"	Songwriters: Terry Lewis, James Harris III, Janet Jackson, Melanie Andrews, Jovan Campbell, Derryl Howard, Maurice Wilson; Recording: Howard "Ross" Vanderslice (Phat Buddah Studios, St. Louis, MO); Melody's vocals: Sean Tallman (The Boom Boom Room, Burbank, CA); Assistant: Miguel Vasquez; Mixing: Phil Tan (Soapbox Studios, Atlanta, GA); Sample: "Let's Wait Awhile" by Janet Jackson
10	"I'm A Rhino"	Songwriters: Jovan Campbell, Derryl Howard, Maurice Wilson; Recording: DJ Beats and Reace Beats (The Basement, St. Louis, MO); Mixing: Phil Tan (Soapbox Studios, Atlanta, GA); Assistant mix engineers: Josh Houghkirk, Aaron Holton
11	"Bring It Back"	Songwriters: Jovan Campbell, Jamal Jones; Guitar: Mike Hartnett; Keyboards: Elvis Williams; Recording: Ethan Willoughby (The Lair, Los Angeles, CA), Tony Terrebone (Chalice Studios, Los Angeles, CA), Jason Schweitzer (Zac, Los Angeles, CA); Mixing: Phil Tan (Soapbox Studios, Atlanta, GA); Assistant mix engineers: Josh Houghkirk, Aaron Holton
12	"Firr Az That Thang"	Songwriters: Jovan Campbell, Lukasz Gottwald, Derryl Howard, Maurice Wilson; Mixing: Serban Ghenea; Engineering: Aniela Gottwald; Background vocals: Helen White; All instruments and Programming: Dr. Luke; Mixing: MixStar Studios, Virginia Beach, VA; Additional Pro Tools engineer: John Hanes; Assistant: Tim Roberts
