= The Masked Singer (British TV series) series 5 =

Season of television series

The Masked Singer
- Series 5
- Starring: Mo Gilligan; Davina McCall; Rita Ora; Jonathan Ross
- Hosted by: Joel Dommett
- No. of contestants: 12
- Winner: Danny Jones as "Piranha"
- Runner-up: Alex Brooker as "Bigfoot"
- No. of episodes: 8

Release
- Original network: ITV
- Original release: 30 December 2023 – 17 February 2024

Series chronology
- ← Previous; Series 4 Next → Series 6

The fifth series of the British version of The Masked Singer premiered on ITV on 30 December 2023, following a Christmas special episode on 25 December. Joel Dommett returned as the show's presenter, whilst Mo Gilligan, Davina McCall, Rita Ora and Jonathan Ross returned as panellists. The series is the second in a two-year commissioning by ITV.

The series was won by singer Danny Jones as "Piranha", whilst TV presenter Alex Brooker finished second as "Bigfoot" and singer Lemar finished third as "Cricket".

== Production ==
The commissioning of the fifth series was announced by ITV in February 2022, alongside the fourth series as part of a two-year contract. Filming for the series took place in October 2023 at Bovingdon Studios in Hertfordshire, with the public being invited to apply for tickets to be in the audience. The series began airing on 30 December 2023, following the show's first Christmas special episode that aired on 25 December and as in second series, would begin prior to the New Year.

== Panellists and host ==
Series 5 panellists and host

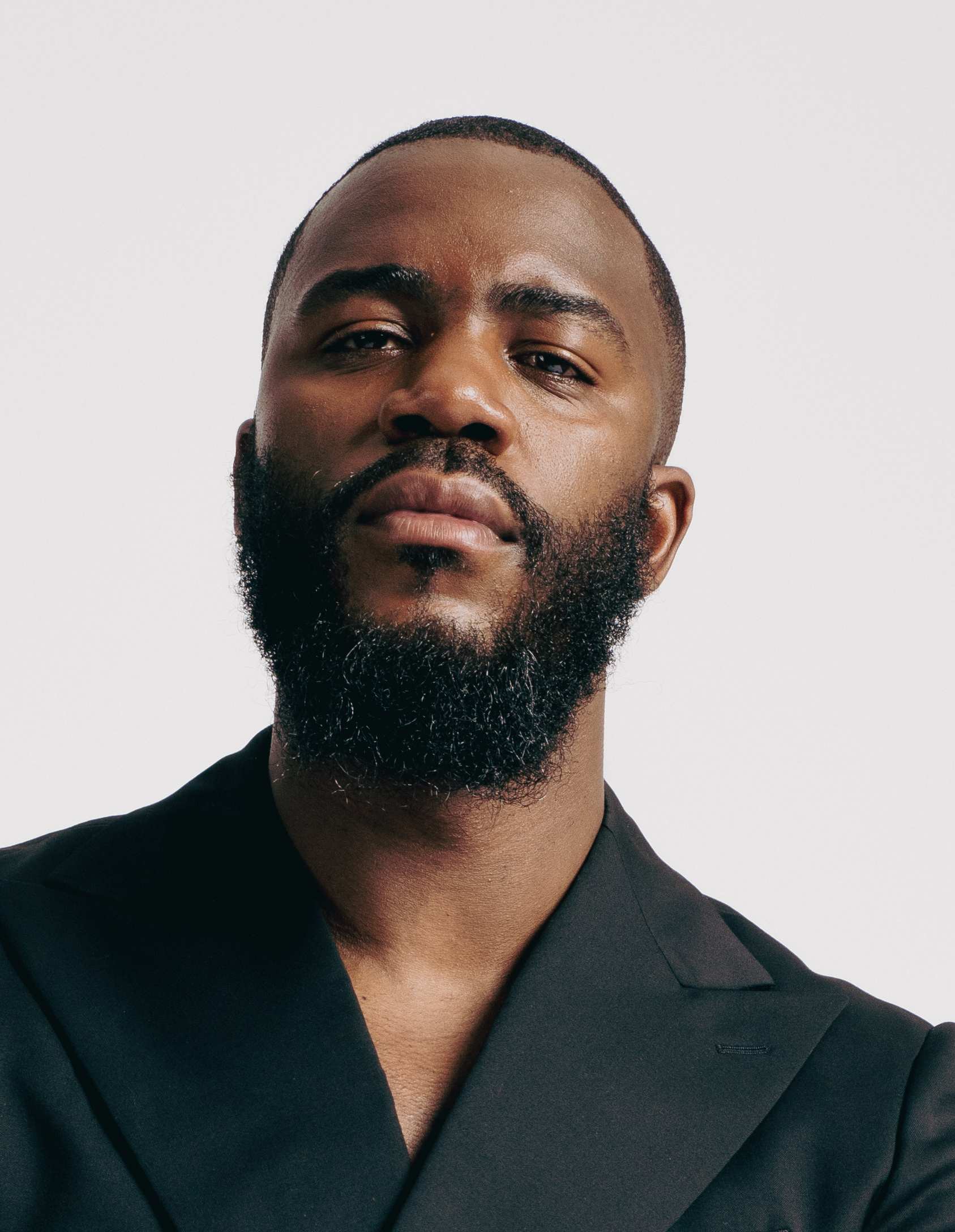
Mo Gilligan

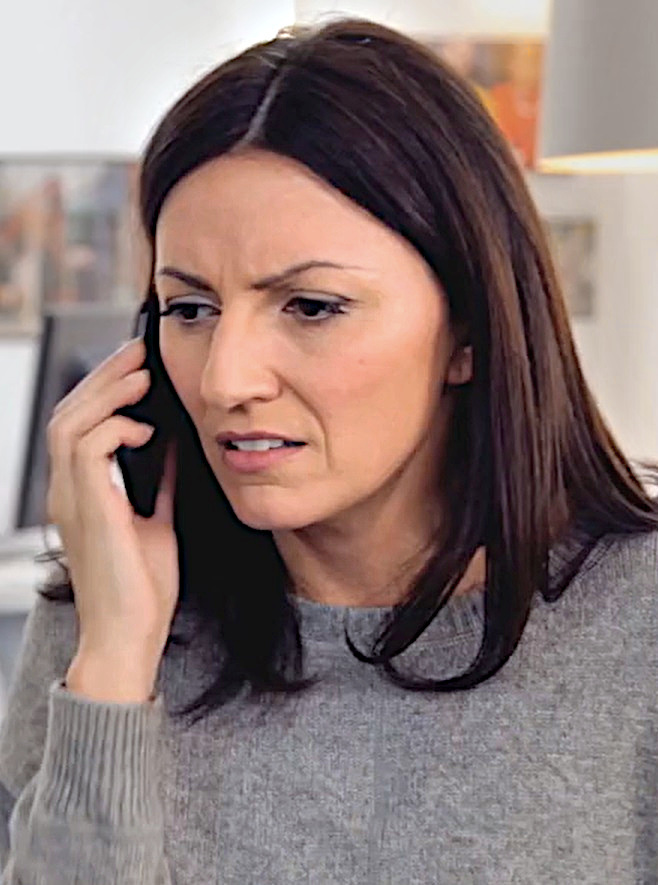
Davina McCall

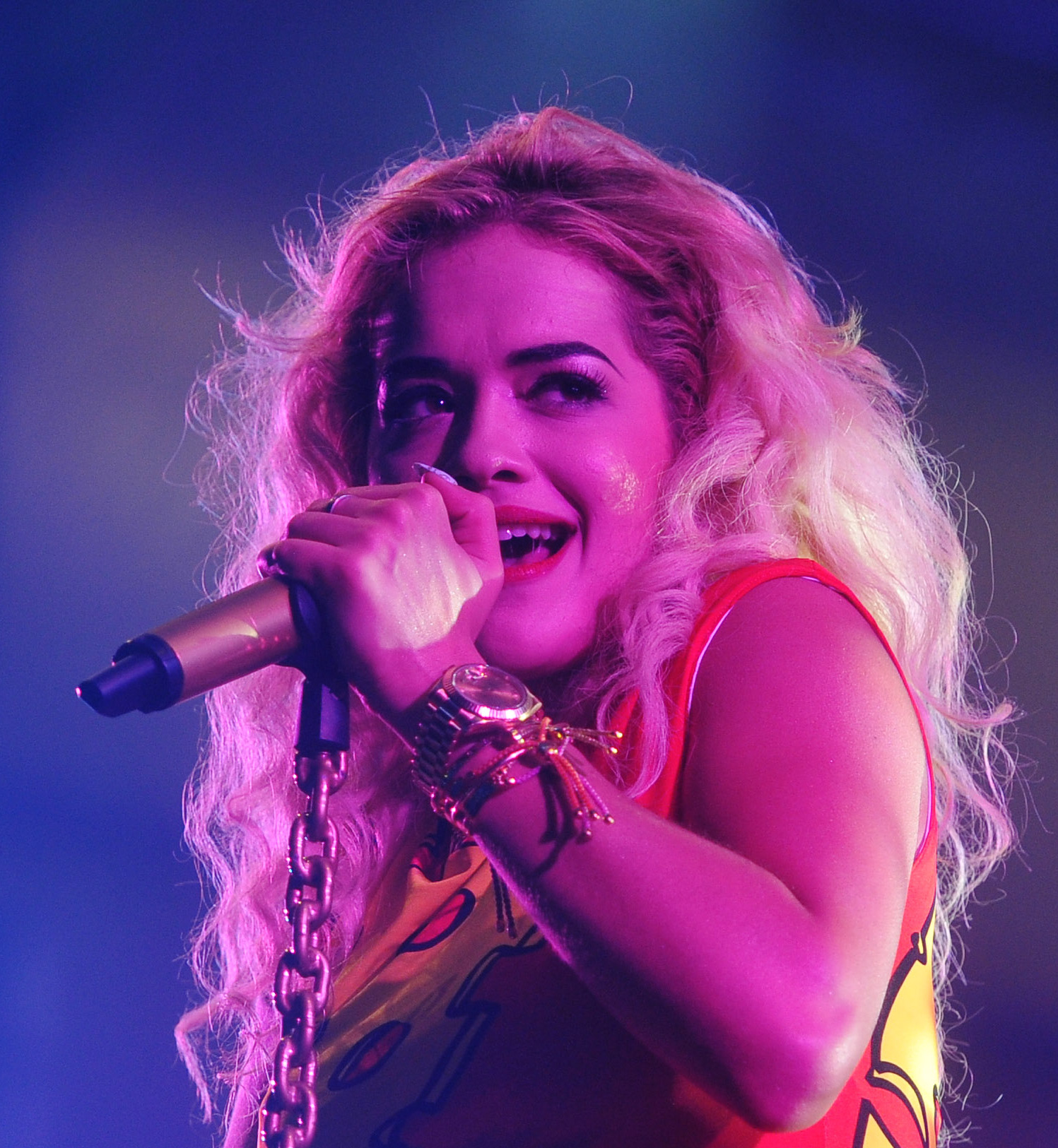
Rita Ora

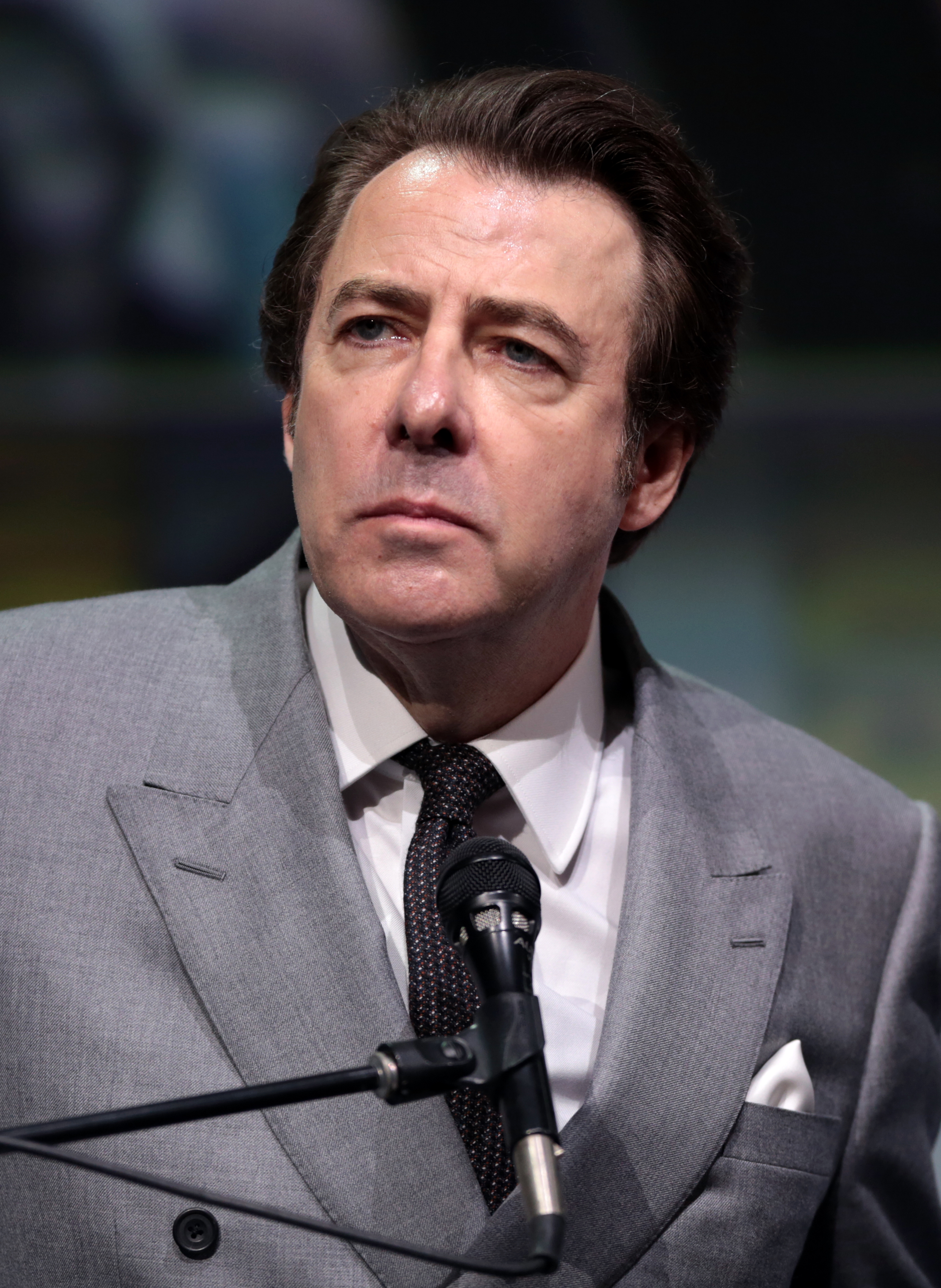
Jonathan Ross

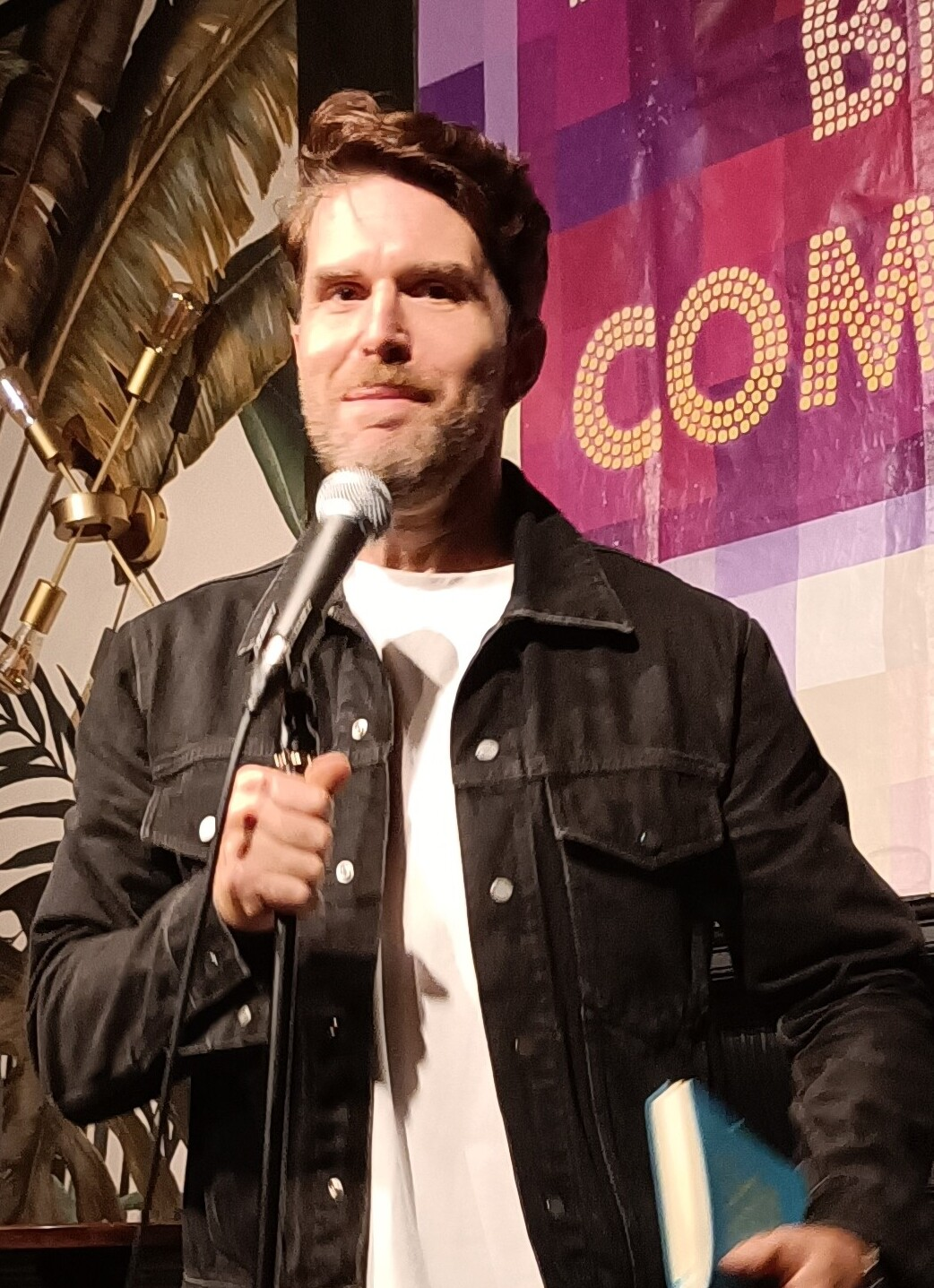
Joel Dommett

Prior to the series airing, it was announced that Joel Dommett would return as presenter, with Jonathan Ross, Davina McCall, Rita Ora and Mo Gilligan all returning to the panel. However, owing to Ora's scheduling conflicts with the eleventh season of the American version, in which she replaced Nicole Scherzinger, it was confirmed that Charlie Simpson, who won the previous series as "Rhino", Olly Murs and Jennifer Saunders would serve as guest panellists in her place for three episodes, with Simpson in the season premiere, Murs in the third episode and Saunders in the fourth episode. Ellie Goulding served as a guest panellist in the fifth episode. Lenny Henry, who appeared in the second series as "Blob", served as a guest panellist in the sixth episode. Lorraine Kelly, who was revealed as "Owl" in the fifth episode, served as a guest panellist in the semi-final. Rob Brydon served as a guest panellist in the final.

== Contestants ==
The twelve costumes for the fifth series were released on 10 December 2023.

Stage name	Celebrity	Occupation	Episodes							
Stage name	Celebrity	Occupation	1	2	3	4	5	6	7	8
Piranha	Danny Jones	Singer		WIN		SAFE	SAFE	SAFE	SAFE	WINNER
Bigfoot	Alex Brooker	TV presenter	WIN		SAFE		SAFE	SAFE	SAFE	RUNNER-UP
Cricket	Lemar	Singer	WIN		SAFE		SAFE	SAFE	SAFE	THIRD
Eiffel Tower	Tiffany	Singer		WIN		SAFE	RISK	RISK	OUT	
Air Fryer	Keala Settle	Actress/singer		WIN		SAFE	SAFE	SAFE	OUT	
Maypole	Melody Thornton	Singer	RISK		SAFE		SAFE	OUT		
Dippy Egg	Nicky Campbell	TV presenter	RISK		RISK		SAFE	OUT		
Owl	Lorraine Kelly	TV presenter		RISK		RISK	OUT			
Bubble Tea	Julia Sawalha	Actress		RISK		OUT				
Rat	Shirley Ballas	Dancer	WIN		OUT					
Chicken Caesar	Alexander Armstrong	TV presenter/actor		OUT						
Weather	Dionne Warwick	Singer	OUT							

The masked singer won their face-off and remained in the competition.
The masked singer was safe from elimination.
The masked singer was in the bottom three/two, but was not eliminated.
The masked singer was eliminated from the competition and unmasked upon their elimination.
The masked singer did not perform.
The masked singer won the competition.
The masked singer finished second.
The masked singer finished third.
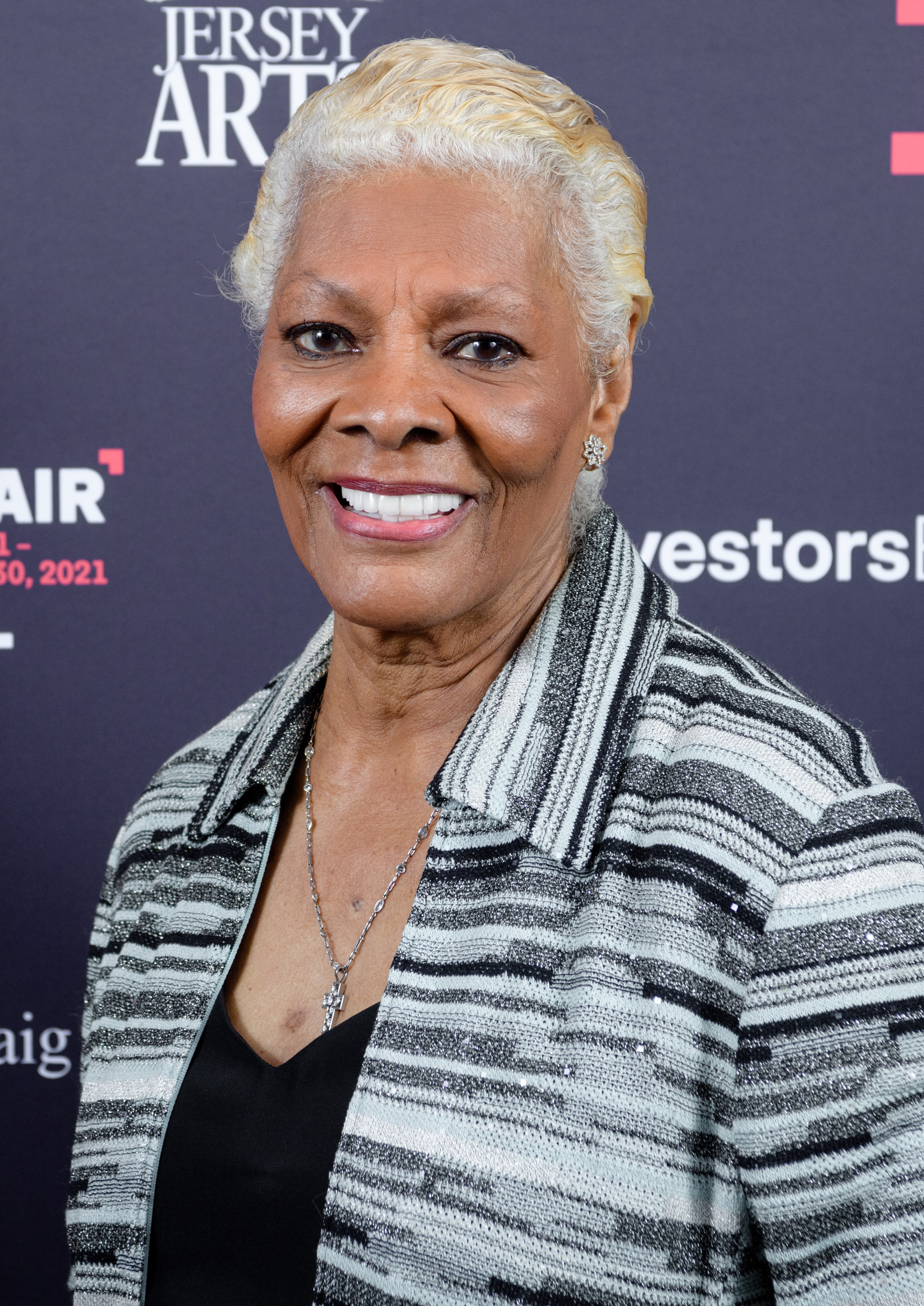
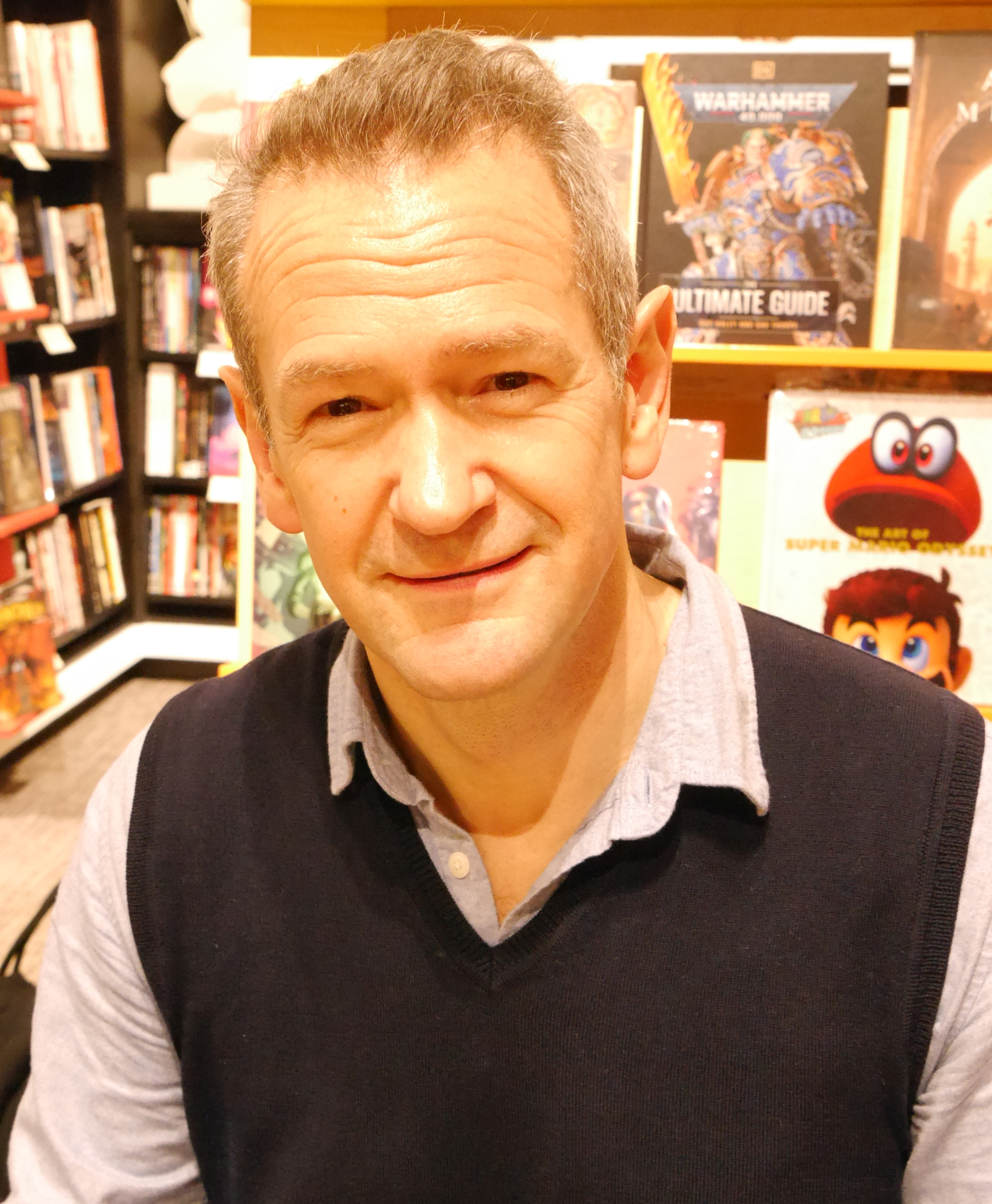
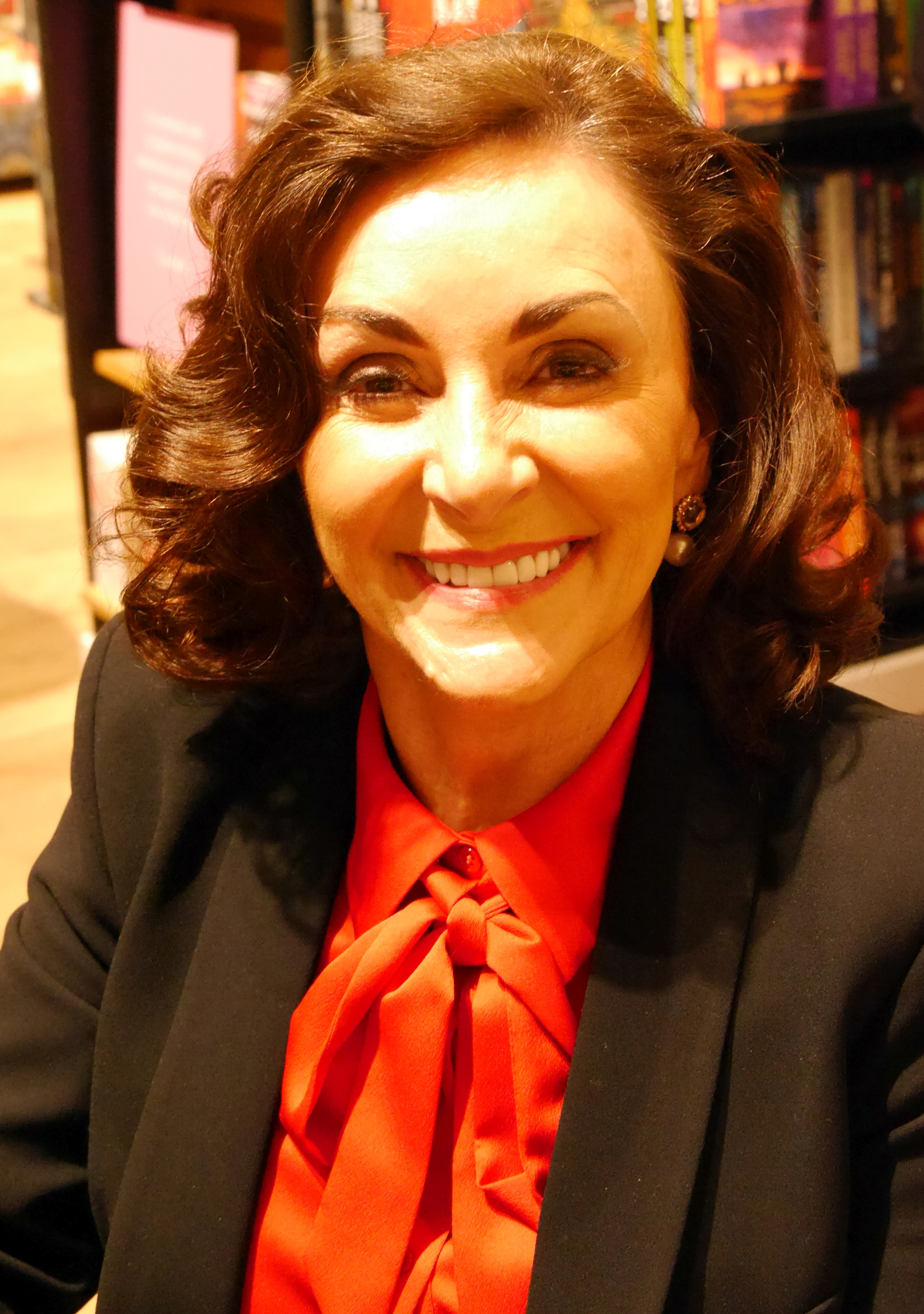
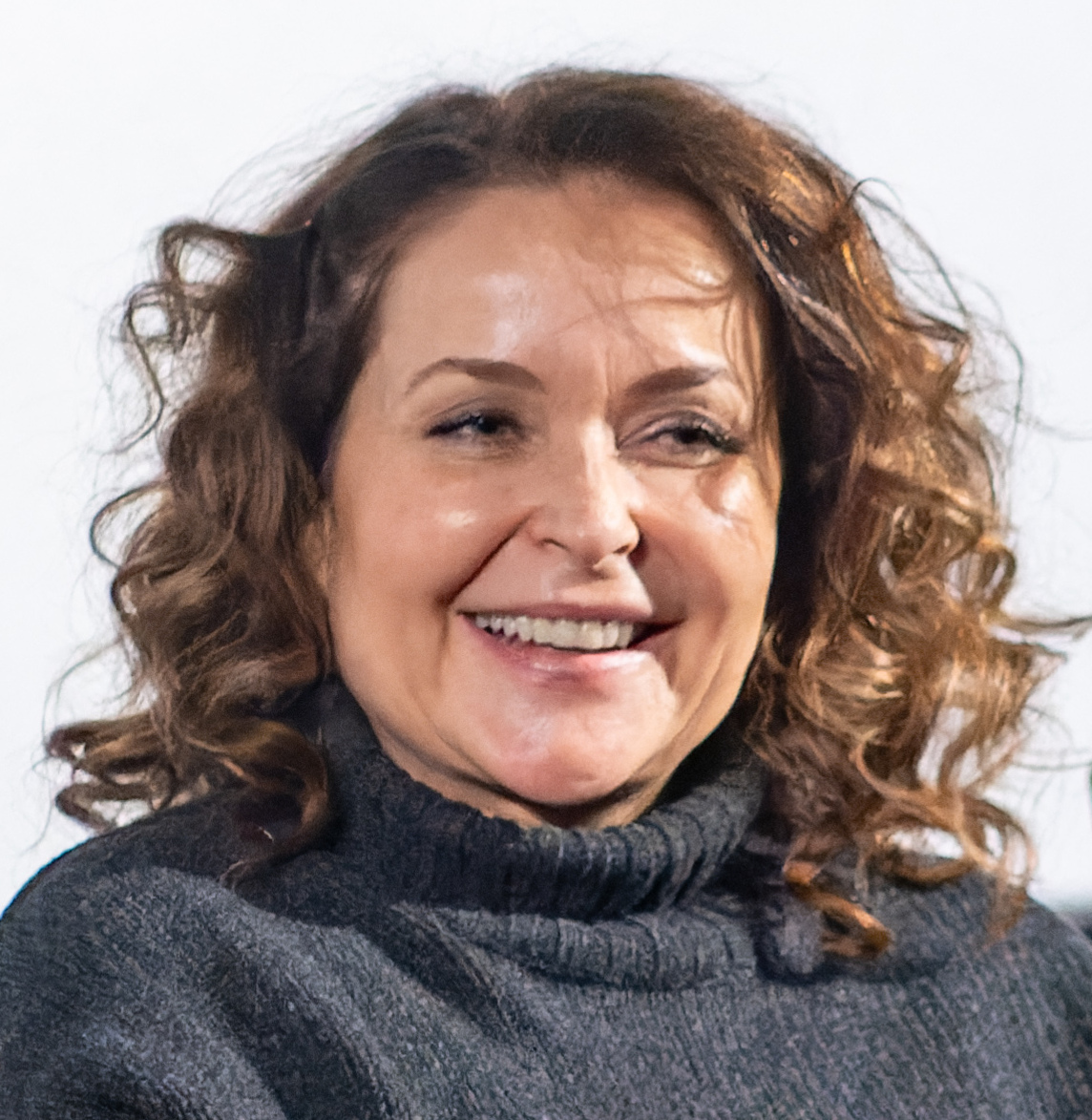
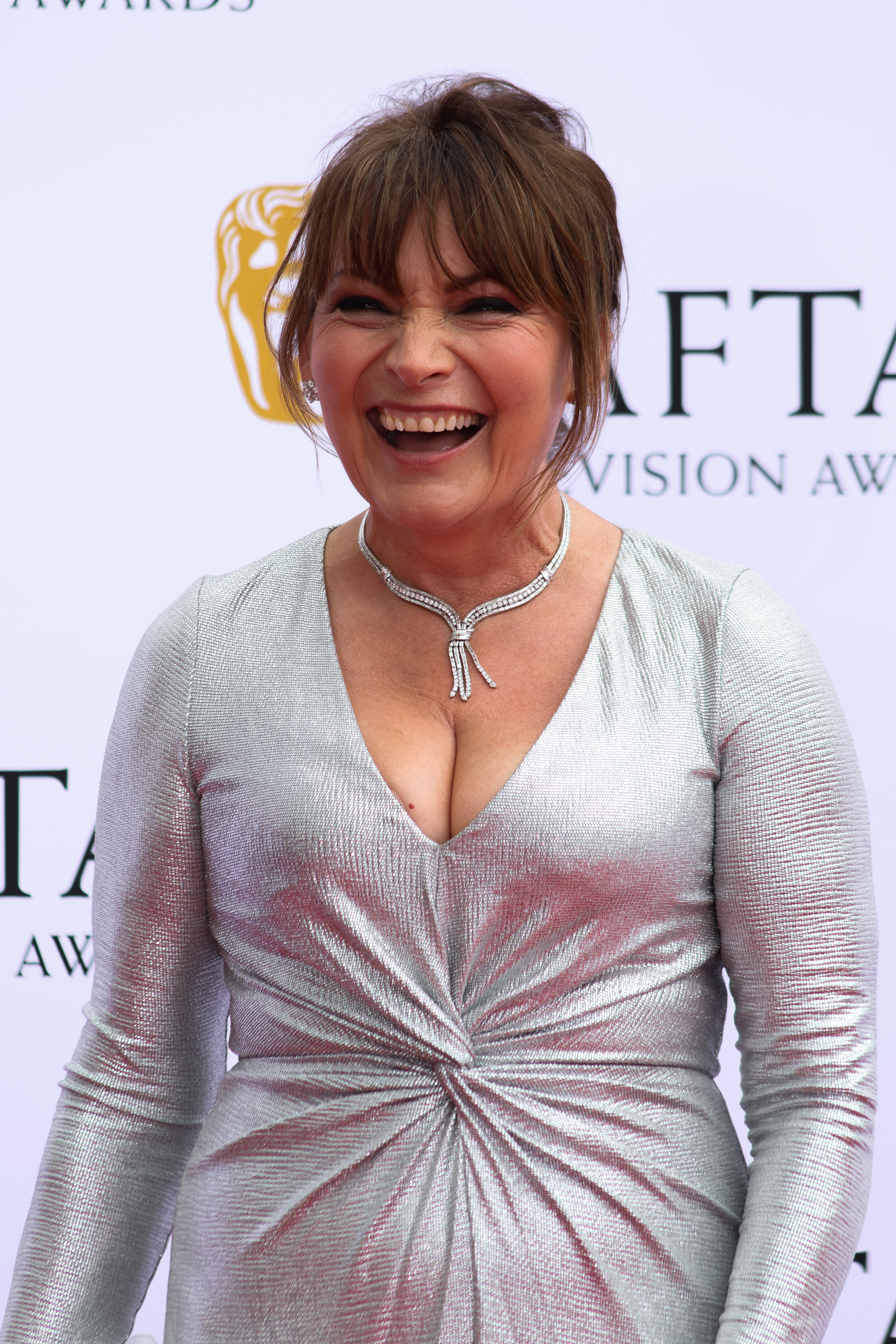
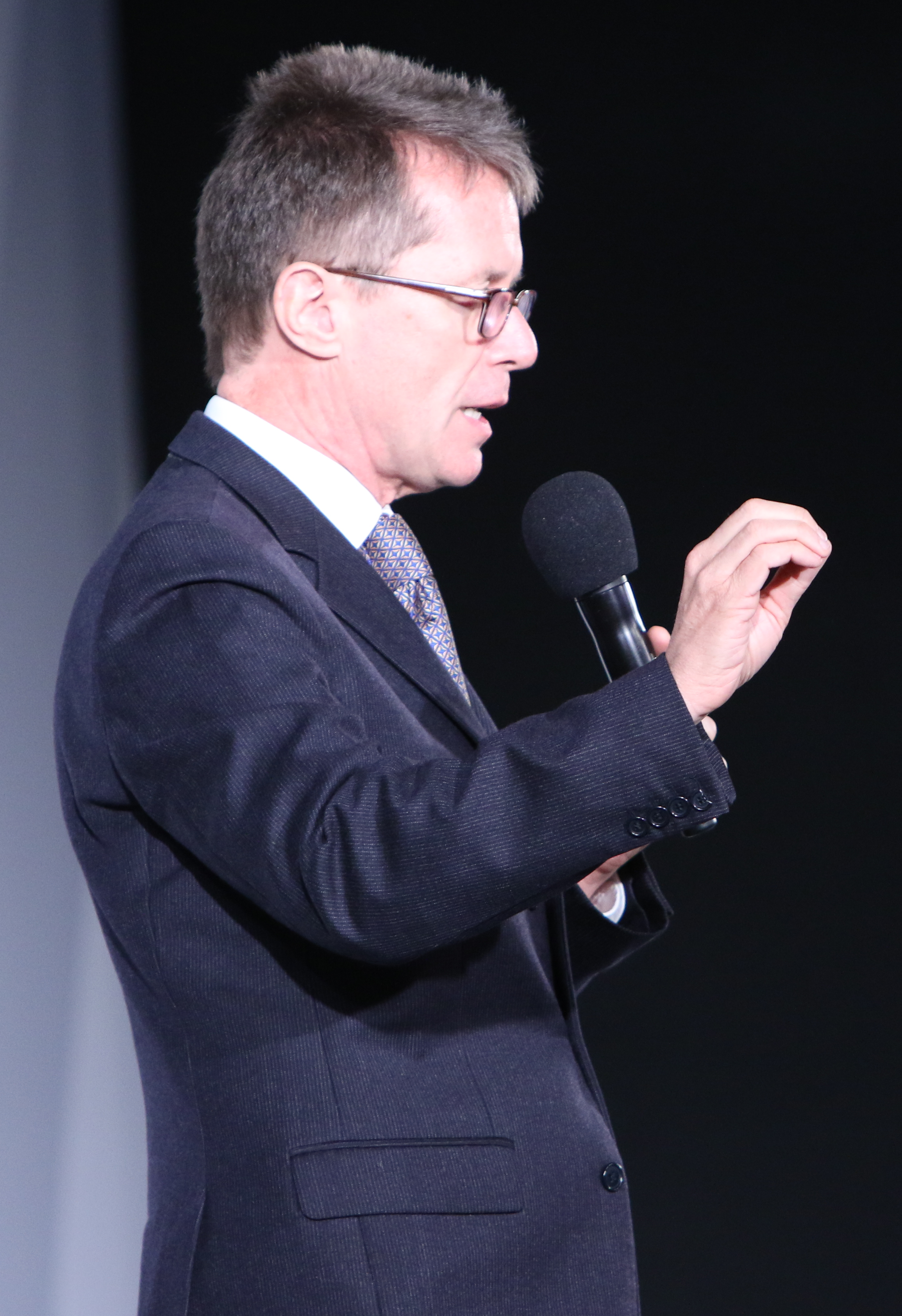
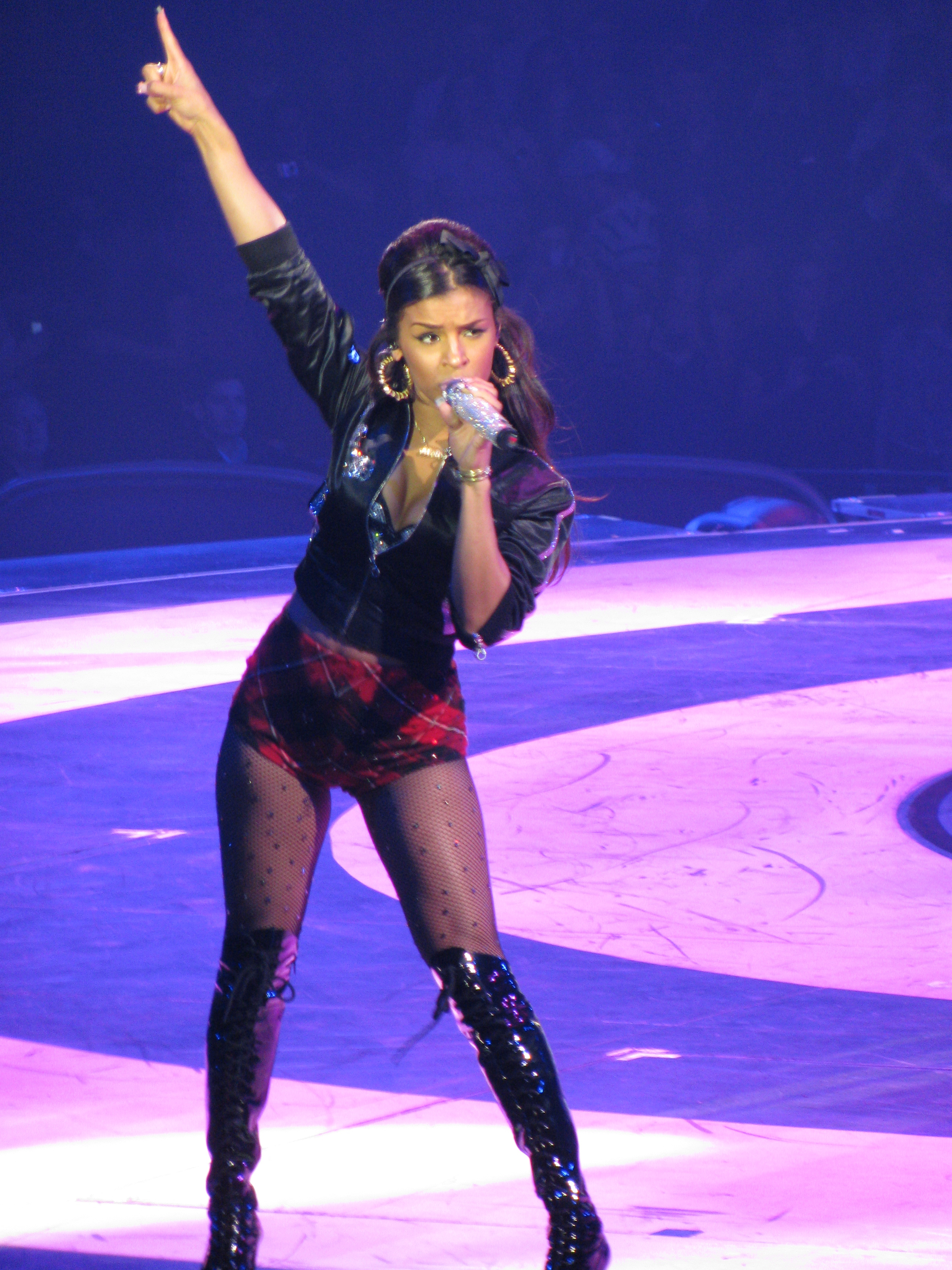
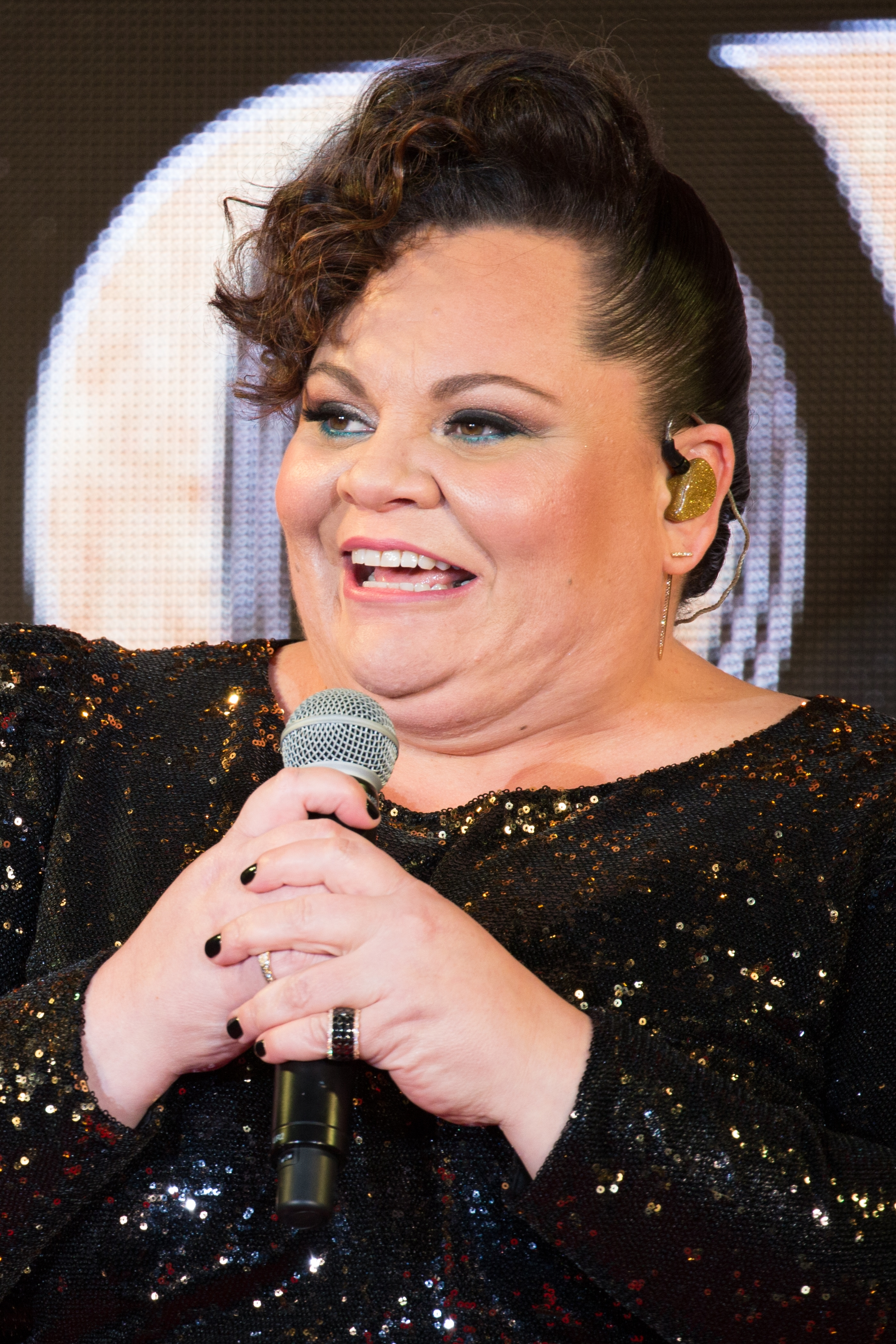
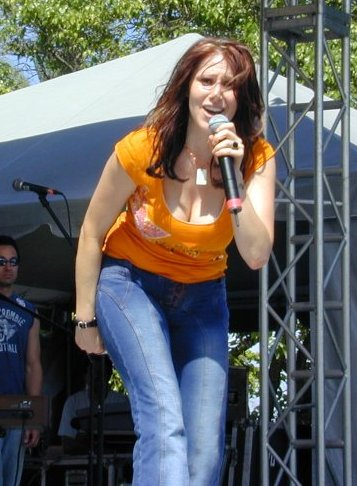
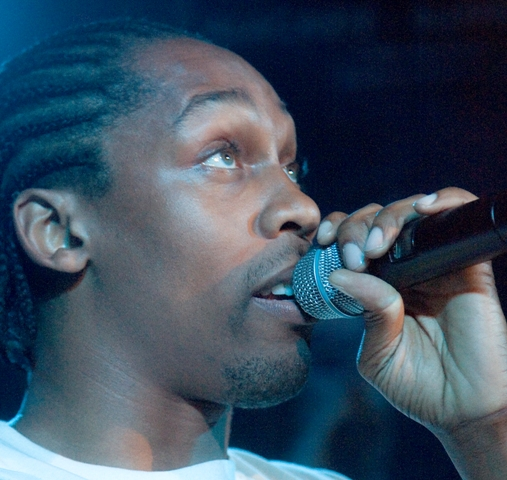
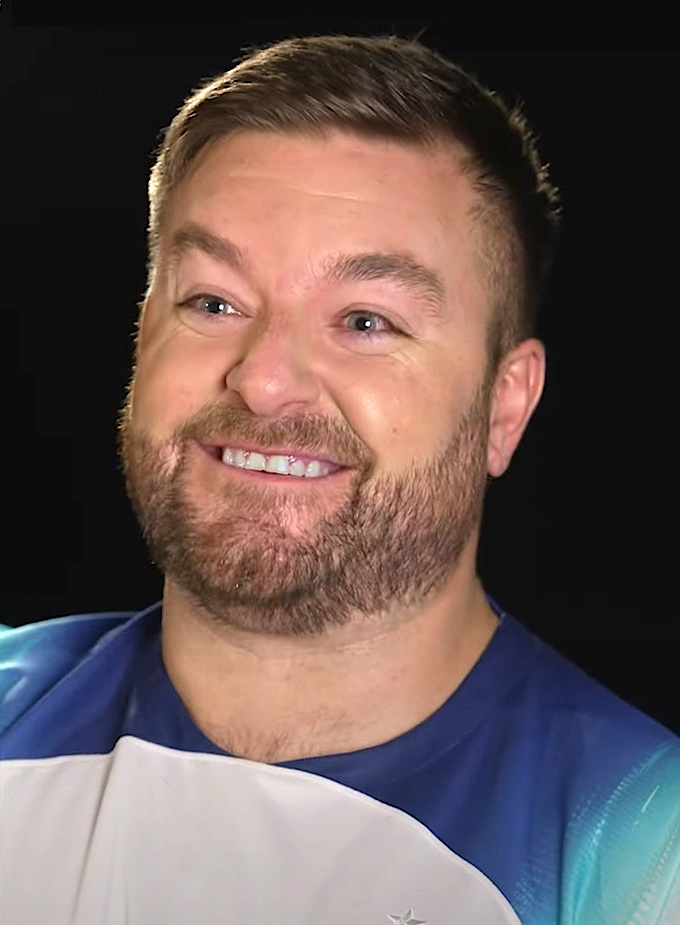
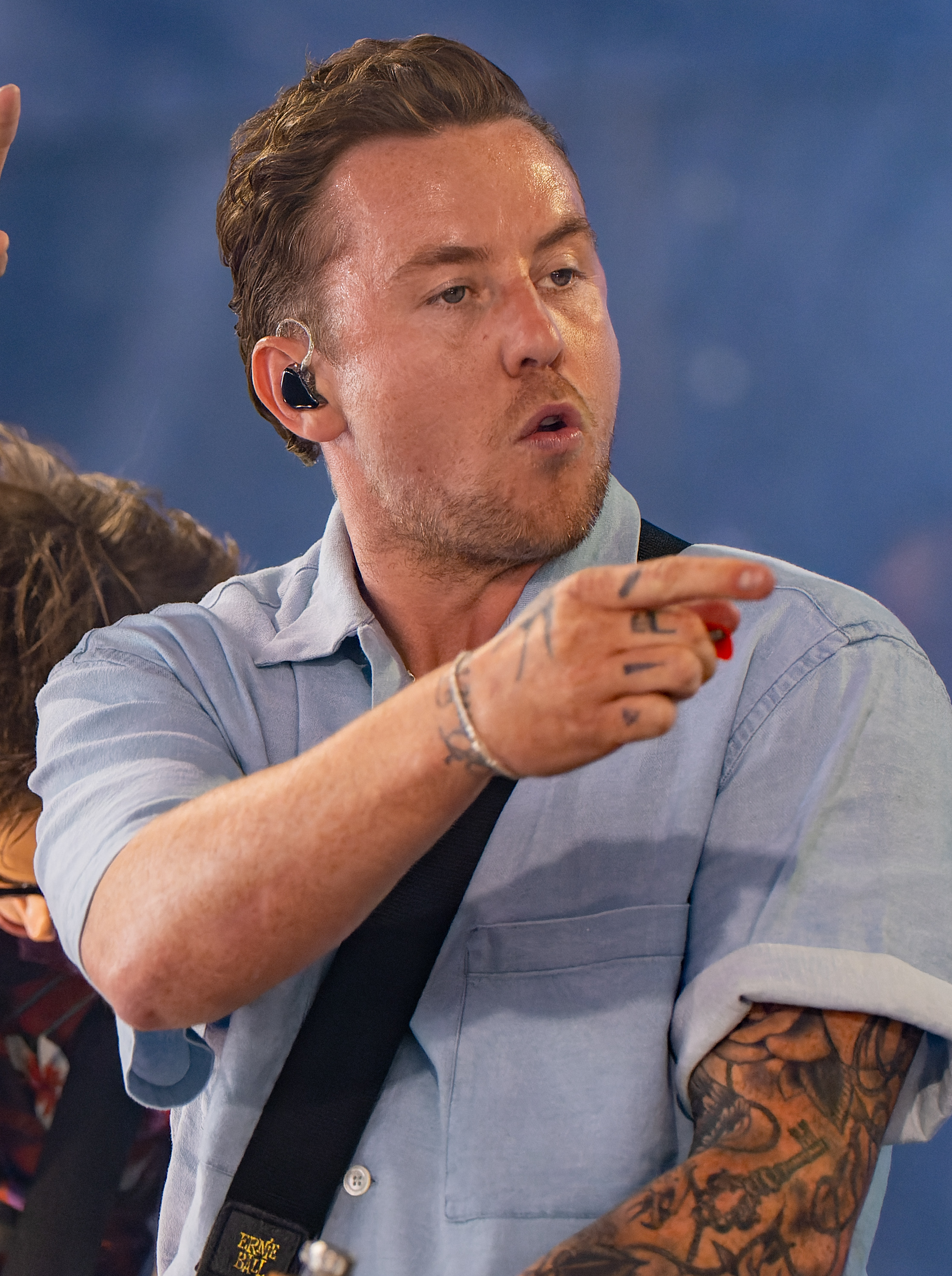
The celebrities who competed in the fifth series of The Masked Singer, pictured in order of elimination (L-R):
Dionne Warwick ("Weather"), Alexander Armstrong ("Chicken Caesar"), Shirley Ballas ("Rat"), Julia Sawalha ("Bubble Tea"), Lorraine Kelly ("Owl"), Nicky Campbell ("Dippy Egg"), Melody Thornton ("Maypole"), Keala Settle ("Air Fryer"), Tiffany ("Eiffel Tower"), Lemar ("Cricket"), Alex Brooker ("Bigfoot"), and Danny Jones ("Piranha")

== Episodes ==
=== Episode 1 (30 December) ===
- Guest panelist: Charlie Simpson (in place of Rita Ora)

Performances on the first episode
#	Stage name	Song	Identity	Result
1	Maypole	"Never Gonna Not Dance Again" by Pink	undisclosed	RISK
2	Cricket	"Place Your Hands" by Reef	undisclosed	WIN
3	Bigfoot	"You're Welcome" from Moana	undisclosed	WIN
4	Dippy Egg	"Daydream Believer" by The Monkees	undisclosed	RISK
5	Weather	"I Can See Clearly Now" by Johnny Nash	Dionne Warwick	OUT
6	Rat	"Boom, Boom, Boom, Boom!!" by Vengaboys	undisclosed	WIN

=== Episode 2 (6 January) ===
Performances on the second episode
#	Stage name	Song	Identity	Result
1	Air Fryer	"Kings & Queens" by Ava Max	undisclosed	WIN
2	Bubble Tea	"Material Girl" by Madonna	undisclosed	RISK
3	Owl	"Padam Padam" by Kylie Minogue	undisclosed	RISK
4	Eiffel Tower	"Voulez-Vous" by ABBA	undisclosed	WIN
5	Chicken Caesar	"Under the Bridge" by Red Hot Chili Peppers	Alexander Armstrong	OUT
6	Piranha	"It's All Coming Back to Me Now" by Celine Dion	undisclosed	WIN

=== Episode 3 (13 January) ===
- Theme: Circus
- Group number: "Let Go for Tonight" by Foxes
- Guest panelist: Olly Murs (in place of Rita Ora)

Performances on the third episode
#	Stage name	Song	Result	
1	Dippy Egg	"There's No Business Like Show Business" by Irving Berlin	RISK	
2	Maypole	"Clown" by Emeli Sandé	SAFE	
3	Bigfoot	"Come Fly With Me" by Frank Sinatra	SAFE	
4	Cricket	"Of the Night" by Bastille	SAFE	
5	Rat	"Nellie the Elephant" by Mandy Miller	RISK	
Sing-Off			Identity	Result
1	Rat	"Y.M.C.A." by Village People	Shirley Ballas	OUT
2	Dippy Egg	"Shotgun" by George Ezra	undisclosed	SAFE

=== Episode 4 (20 January) ===
- Theme: School Disco
- Group number: "Live While We're Young" by One Direction
- Guest panelist: Jennifer Saunders (in place of Rita Ora)

Performances on the fourth episode
#	Stage name	Song	Result	
1	Piranha	"Treasure" by Bruno Mars	SAFE	
2	Eiffel Tower	"Angels" by Robbie Williams	SAFE	
3	Owl	"Don't Stop Movin'" by S Club 7	RISK	
4	Bubble Tea	"Le Freak" by Chic	RISK	
5	Air Fryer	"The Final Countdown" by Europe	SAFE	
Sing-Off			Identity	Result
1	Owl	"Chirpy Chirpy Cheep Cheep" by Middle of the Road	undisclosed	SAFE
2	Bubble Tea	"What's Up?" by 4 Non Blondes	Julia Sawalha	OUT

=== Episode 5 (27 January) ===
- Guest panelist: Ellie Goulding

Performances on the fifth episode
#	Stage name	Clue song	Identity	Result
1	Eiffel Tower	"Flowers" by Miley Cyrus	undisclosed	RISK
2	Dippy Egg	"I'm Gonna Be (500 Miles)" by The Proclaimers	undisclosed	SAFE
3	Cricket	"How Deep Is Your Love" by Calvin Harris & Disciples	undisclosed	SAFE
4	Owl	"Happy Talk" by Captain Sensible	Lorraine Kelly	OUT
5	Piranha	"How Am I Supposed to Live Without You" by Michael Bolton	undisclosed	SAFE
6	Bigfoot	"Re-Rewind" by Artful Dodger ft. Craig David	undisclosed	SAFE
7	Air Fryer	"The Lonely Goatherd" from The Sound of Music	undisclosed	SAFE
8	Maypole	"Sweet Melody" by Little Mix	undisclosed	SAFE

=== Episode 6 (3 February) ===
- Guest panelist: Lenny Henry

Performances on the sixth episode
#	Stage name	Song	Identity	Result
1	Maypole	"Let You Love Me" by Rita Ora	Melody Thornton	OUT
2	Cricket	“Antenna” by Fuse ODG	undisclosed	SAFE
3	Dippy Egg	"Moon River" by Andy Williams	Nicky Campbell	OUT
4	Bigfoot	"Shut Up and Dance" by Walk the Moon	undisclosed	SAFE
5	Air Fryer	"Defying Gravity" from Wicked	undisclosed	SAFE
6	Eiffel Tower	"Stay" by Rihanna ft. Mikky Ekko	undisclosed	RISK
7	Piranha	"Since U Been Gone" by Kelly Clarkson	undisclosed	SAFE

=== Episode 7: Semi-final (10 February) ===
- Guest panelist: Lorraine Kelly

First performances on the seventh episode
#	Stage name	Song	Identity	Result
1	Eiffel Tower	"Paradise City" by Guns N' Roses	undisclosed	SAFE
2	Bigfoot	"Everybody (Backstreet's Back)" by Backstreet Boys	undisclosed	SAFE
3	Piranha	"Without You" by Harry Nilsson	undisclosed	SAFE
4	Air Fryer	"I'm Outta Love" by Anastacia	Keala Settle	OUT
5	Cricket	"I Can't Make You Love Me" by Bonnie Raitt	undisclosed	SAFE

Second performances on the seventh episode
#	Stage name	Song	Identity	Result
1	Bigfoot	"Never Forget" by Take That	undisclosed	SAFE
2	Eiffel Tower	"Castle on the Hill" by Ed Sheeran	Tiffany	OUT
3	Piranha	"In the Name of Love" by Martin Garrix & Bebe Rexha	undisclosed	SAFE
4	Cricket	"As It Was" by Harry Styles	undisclosed	SAFE

After being unmasked, Tiffany performed her cover of "I Think We're Alone Now" as her encore.

=== Episode 8: Final (17 February) ===
- Group number: "By Your Side" by Calvin Harris ft. Tom Grennan
- Guest panelist: Rob Brydon

First performances on the eighth episode
#	Stage name	Song
1	Cricket	"A Thousand Miles" by Vanessa Carlton
2	Bigfoot	"The One and Only" by Chesney Hawkes
3	Piranha	"Lay Me Down" by Sam Smith

Second performances on the eighth episode
#	Stage name	Song	Duet partner	Identity	Result
1	Cricket	"Rewrite the Stars" from The Greatest Showman	Charlotte Church (Mushroom)	Lemar	THIRD PLACE
2	Bigfoot	"Dancing on the Ceiling" by Lionel Richie	Ricky Wilson (Phoenix)	undisclosed	SAFE
3	Piranha	"Believe" by Cher	Natalie Appleton (Fawn)	undisclosed	SAFE

Third performances on the eighth episode
#	Stage name	Song of the series	Identity	Result
1	Bigfoot	"You're Welcome" from Moana	Alex Brooker	RUNNER-UP
2	Piranha	"It's All Coming Back to Me Now" by Celine Dion	Danny Jones	WINNER

== Ratings ==
Official ratings are taken from BARB, utilising the four-screen dashboard which includes viewers who watched the programme on laptops, smartphones, and tablets within 7 days of the original broadcast.

Episode	Date	Official 7 day rating (millions)	Weekly rank for ITV	Weekly rank for all UK TV
1	30 December	4.55	6	23
2	6 January	5.19	6	14
3	13 January	4.72	4	12
4	20 January	4.44	6	14
5	27 January	4.42	4	12
6	3 February	4.90	4	11
7	10 February	4.77	3	11
8	17 February	5.54	3	8
Series average	2023/2024	4.81	—N/a	
