= Chain Hang Low =

Single by Jibbs

from the album Jibbs Featuring Jibbs
- Released: June 20, 2006
- Recorded: 2006
- Studio: Phat Buddah Studios, St. Louis
- Genre: Hip hop; pop rap
- Length: 3:32
- Label: Geffen
- Songwriters: Jovan Campbell; Derryl Howard; Maurice Wilson; Antwain Elliott; Lamont McLendon
- Producer: The Beatstaz

Jibbs singles chronology
"Chain Hang Low" (2006)	"King Kong" (2006)

Music video
- "Chain Hang Low" on YouTube

"Chain Hang Low" is the debut single by American rapper Jibbs from his 2006 debut album Jibbs Featuring Jibbs. The melody and lyrics of the chorus are based on the children's song "Do Your Ears Hang Low?". "Chain Hang Low" peaked at number 7 on the Billboard Hot 100, his only top 40 hit on that chart. It also reached number 6 on the Billboard Hot Rap Songs and 16 on Hot R&B/Hip-Hop Songs charts and charted in countries like Ireland and New Zealand. The song went on to rack up more than 20,000 ringtone downloads in a span of two weeks. The song reached number 50 on Complex's list of the 100 best hip-hop one-hit wonders.

== Background ==
The song title and the chorus' melody and lyrics are based on "Do Your Ears Hang Low?," which has the same melody as the American folk song "Turkey in the Straw".

== Chart performance ==
"Chain Hang Low" debuted at number 69 on the Billboard Hot 100 the week of August 19, 2006. Six weeks later, it reached the top 10 at number 8 on the week of September 30 and maintained that position for three weeks. It peaked at number 7 the week of October 21 and stayed on the chart for twenty weeks.

== Music video ==
Directed by Benny Boom, the video features Jibbs rapping the lyrics while he's moving around his old neighborhood. Along the way, children singing the "Do your chain hang low" hook attempt to steal ice cream from an ice cream truck, and Jibbs fights in a boxing match. The video was shot entirely in a studio on green screen when the production company, Robot Films, lost the permit to shoot the video on the actual streets the night before the scheduled shoot. Everything from the ice cream truck, to the people running, was all simulated in a suburban St. Louis industrial park studio and composited in post-production at the Syndrome Los Angeles production facilities. To maintain the accuracy of Jibbs's home neighborhood, James Larese of the Robot Films collective Syndrome visited the actual neighborhood and took an extensive series of still digital photographs which were added during post production.

== Remix ==
There was an official remix released which featured Yung Joc, Rich Boy, Lil' Mont, and Lil Wayne.

== Formats and track listing ==
- Europe 12"
  - A1. "Chain Hang Low" – 3:32
  - A2. "Chain Hang Low" (Instrumental) – 3:32
  - B1. "Hood" – 2:59
  Europe CD
  - 1. "Chain Hang Low" (Album Version) – 3:32
  - 2. "Hood" (Album Version) – 2:59
- Europe CD (Promo)
  - 1. "Chain Hang Low" (Album Version) – 3:32
  - 2. "Chain Hang Low" (Remix) (feat. Lil Mont, Lil Wayne, Rich Boy, Yung Joc) – 4:06
  US CD
  - 1. "Chain Hang Low" (Main Version) – 3:32
  - 2. "Chain Hang Low" (Instrumental) – 3:32

== Charts and certifications ==
=== Weekly charts ===
Chart (2006–07)	Peak Position
Australia (ARIA)	87
Australian Urban (ARIA)	20
Belgium (Ultratip Bubbling Under Flanders)	14
Germany (GfK)	90
Ireland (IRMA)	14
New Zealand (Recorded Music NZ)	1
Scottish Singles Sales (Official Charts)	72
UK Singles (Official Charts)	63
UK Hip Hop/R&B (Official Charts)	10
US Billboard Hot 100	7
US Hot R&B/Hip-Hop Songs (Billboard)	16
US Hot Rap Songs (Billboard)	6
US Pop Airplay (Billboard)	25
US Pop 100 (Billboard)	11
US Rhythmic Airplay (Billboard)	10

=== Year-end charts ===
Chart (2006)	Position
US Billboard Hot 100	65
US Hot R&B/Hip-Hop Songs (Billboard)	86

=== Certifications ===
Region	Certification	Certified units/sales
United States (RIAA)	Platinum	1,000,000^{^}
^{^} Shipments figures based on certification alone.

== See also ==
- "G-Slide (Tour Bus)", a 2007 Lil' Mama song that's similar in style.
