= Melody Thornton =

American singer and television personality (born 1984)

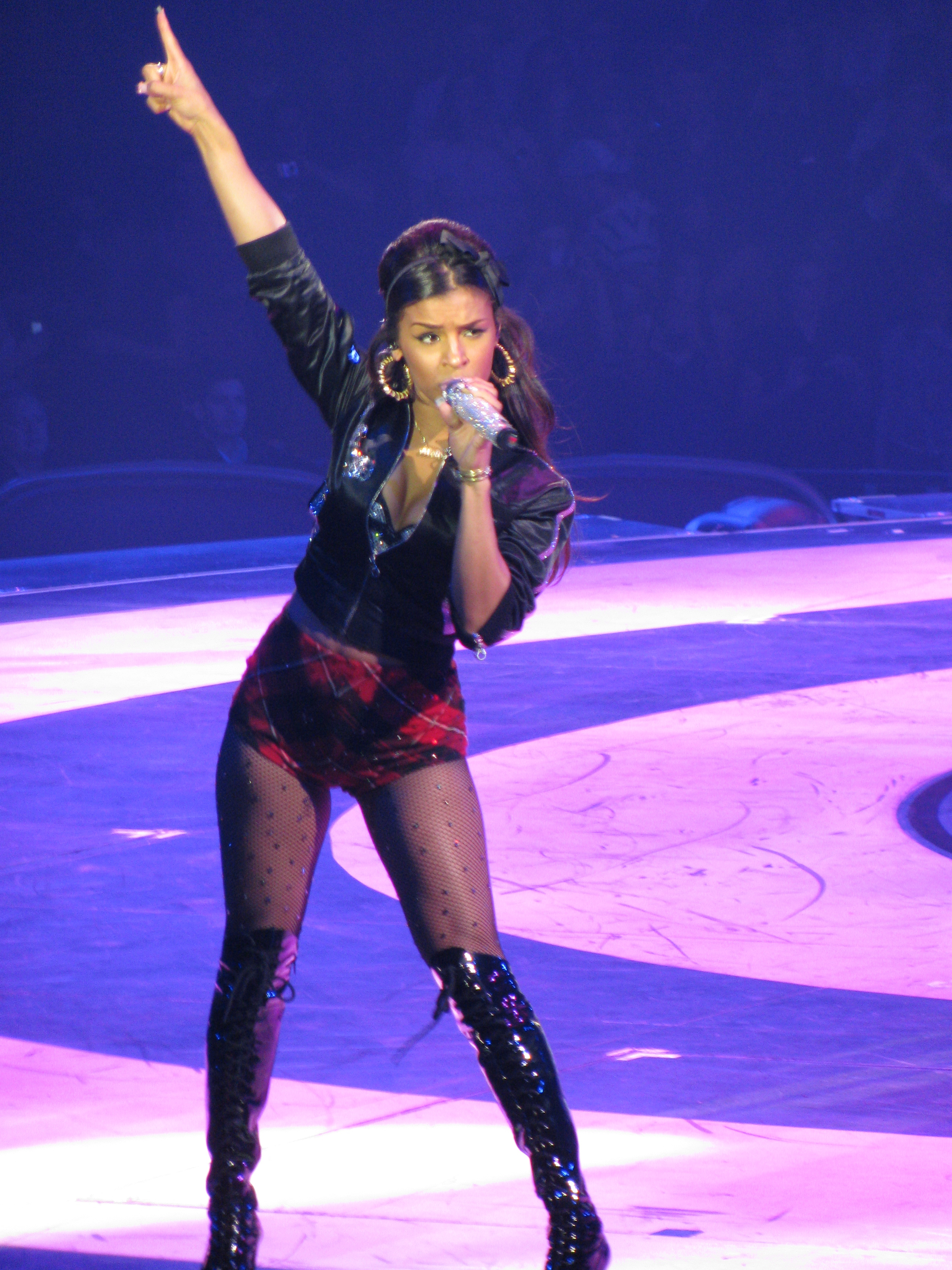
- Thornton in 2009

Background information
- Born: September 28, 1984 (age 42); Phoenix, Arizona, U.S.
- Origin: Los Angeles, California, U.S.
- Genres: R&B; pop; hip-hop; soul
- Occupations: Singer; television personality
- Years active: 2003–present
- Label: Interscope
- Formerly of: The Pussycat Dolls
- Website: melodythornton.com

Melody Thornton (born September 28, 1984) is an American singer and television personality. After graduating high school, Thornton became one of the main vocalists of the girl group the Pussycat Dolls and released the albums PCD (2005) and Doll Domination (2008) becoming one of the world's best-selling girl groups. As part of the group, she has received a Grammy Award nomination.

Following her departure from the group in 2010, Thornton independently released a mixtape, P.O.Y.B.L (2012), and an EP, Lioness Eyes (2020). Outside her music, she has competed on reality shows, Popstar to Operastar (2011), Dancing on Ice (2019) and won the fourth season of the Australian version of The Masked Singer (2022). She has also done several stage works, including playing Rachel Marron in the musical The Bodyguard.

== Early life ==
Melody Thornton is a native of Phoenix, Arizona and was born on September 28, 1984, to a family of Mexican and African-American descent. She was educated in Camelback High School. Her first performance was at her school, where she sang "This Little Light of Mine" at the age of six, and continued to perform at local talent shows in Arizona. After high school, she majored in music engineering for one semester.

== Career ==
=== 2003–2010: The Pussycat Dolls ===
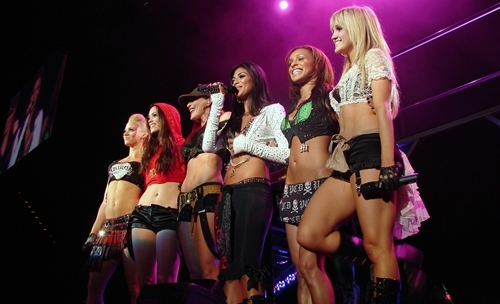
Thornton (second to the right) with the Pussycat Dolls performing onstage in 2007.

At the age of 19, Thornton traveled to Burbank, California to audition for the Pussycat Dolls. The group's founder Robin Antin, struck a deal with Interscope Geffen A&M Records' Jimmy Iovine to develop the Pussycat Dolls into a brand and create a separate recording pop group. Thornton was selected to strengthen their vocal ability and joined Carmit Bachar, Ashley Roberts, Nicole Scherzinger, Jessica Sutta, and Kimberly Wyatt, and signed a contract with the Pussycat Dolls partnership, receiving a percentage of the group's revenues. Thornton along with Bachar supplied vocals as secondary vocalists, while Scherzinger assumed the majority of the vocals as the lead singer. Thornton was the youngest and the only member who did not have a background in dance. The group released their first single, "Don't Cha" (featuring Busta Rhymes), which stands as the group's most successful single to date peaking at number two on the Billboard Hot 100 chart and reaching the top in 15 other countries. Thornton didn't like the song in the beginning, as she found too controversial. They released their self-titled debut album in September 2005. Subsequent singles, "Stickwitu and "Buttons" also reached the top five on the Billboard Hot 100 chart. PCD went on to sell seven million copies worldwide and established the Pussycat Dolls as viable in the music industry earning them a reputation among the century's few breakout successes.

Thornton was featured on Jibbs' single "Go Too Far", which was released in March 2007; it entered the top-twenty on the New Zealand Singles Chart. Their second and final studio album Doll Domination was released in September 2008, the album attained its highest peak position on the US Billboard 200, but it is considered a commercial disappointment selling less than 400,000 copies in the US. Doll Domination included the singles "When I Grow Up" and "I Hate This Part", which reached the top twenty on the US Billboard Hot 100 chart. In January 2009, the group embarked on the Doll Domination Tour, their second headlining concert tour, which highlighted stops in Europe, Oceania and Asia, and grossed over $14 million. (Note: The gross takings from the 23 shows which were reported to Billboard Boxscore totalled $14.3 million.) Following the release of the group's single 2009 "Jai Ho! (You Are My Destiny)", tensions in the group rose due to Scherzinger being billed as a featured artist on the release. This would go on to lead to a public outburst by Thornton during the group's tour appearance while opening for The Circus Starring Britney Spears. The group would then announce a hiatus towards the end of the year.

Thornton then appeared as a panelist on E!'s Bank of Hollywood in which contestants must appeal to a celebrity panel to receive money. It lasted for one season. In June 2010, Thornton confirmed she had departed the Pussycat Dolls and was working on a solo album.

=== 2011–present: Solo music, television, and stage work ===
Since her departure from the group, Thornton has remained an independent artist. In June 2011 she participated in the second series of Popstar to Operastar, a British television programme in which pop stars were trained to sing opera; she was eliminated in the third week. The same month she released her debut single "Sweet Vendeta" which preceded the release of her debut mixtape, P.O.Y.B.L (Piss On Your Black List), the following year. It contains ten tracks which consist of five covers and four songs solely written by Thornton. In 2013 she collaborated with Bizzy Crook, LL Cool J, and Prince Kay One for their respective albums released that year.

In 2017, Thornton returned to British television by appearing on the second series of Celebs Go Dating and Celebrity Island with Bear Grylls. She then landed the lead role of Rachel Marron in the musical The Bodyguard, which toured in China for several months. In 2019, Thornton was eliminated on the eight-week and placed fifth on the eleventh series of Dancing on Ice. This was followed with stage roles on Rip It Up – The 70s, a show inspired by music of the 70s and played the part of Cinderella in the New Wimbledon Theatre production of the family pantomime, Cinderella. Thornton opted out of joining the November reunion of the Pussycat Dolls in order to focus on her solo endeavors. She collaborated with UK DJ producer Harrison on the dance track "Freak Like Me" and released her first solo track in seven years, "Love Will Return". A ballad that is a nod to her heritage and serves as the lead single for her debut EP, Lioness Eyes. The EP, which includes seven songs was released on August 7.

In 2022, Thornton competed and won the fourth season of the Australian version of The Masked Singer as "Mirrorball", and the following year reprised her role as Rachel Marron in the 2023 UK and Ireland production of the musical The Bodyguard. In February 2024, Thornton participated in the fifth series of The Masked Singer UK as the character "Maypole". She was eliminated and unmasked in the sixth episode.

== Artistry and musical style ==
Thornton was inspired to sing after her father's favorite artists, B. B. King, Aretha Franklin, and The Jacksons. In another interview, she named Mariah Carey as a vocal inspiration. Her vocals were likened to Christina Aguilera's, who also influenced Thornton's career, as the singer noted: "[She] inspired me to follow my dreams, [...] she changed my life".

== Discography ==
=== Extended plays ===
List of extended plays, with track listings
Title	Album details
Lioness Eyes	Released: August 7, 2020; Label: Self-released; Formats: Streaming; Track listing: 1. "Pray For Me"; 2. "Goodbye To Happiness"; 3. "Love Will Return"; 4. "Sing About You"; 5. "I Will Wait"; 6. "Lioness Eyes"; 7. "Phoenix Rise"

=== Mixtapes ===
Title	Details
P.O.Y.B.L	Released: March 15, 2012; Label: Independent; Formats: Digital download

=== Singles ===
List of singles, showing album name and year released
Title	Year	Album	Ref.
"Sweet Vendetta"	2011	P.O.Y.B.L	
"Love Will Return"	2019	Lioness Eyes	
"Phoenix Rise"	2020	Lioness Eyes	
"I Will Wait"	2020	Lioness Eyes	

=== Featured singles ===
List of singles as featured artist, with selected chart positions, showing album name and year released
Title	Year	Peaks		Album
Title	Year	NZ	UK	Album
"Go Too Far" (Jibbs featuring Melody Thornton)	2007	17	126	Jibbs Featuring Jibbs
"Freak Like Me" (Harrison featuring Melody Thornton)	2019	–	–	Non-album single

=== Album appearances ===
List of album appearances, showing album name and year released
Title	Year	Other artists	Album(s)	Ref.
"Space" (Note: Each member was credited to a solo track on the European double-disc deluxe version of the album.)	2008	The Pussycat Dolls	Doll Domination	
"Ease Off the Liquor" (Note: additional vocals)	2009	Timbaland	Shock Value 2	
"Something About You (Love The World)"	2013	LL Cool J Charlie Wilson; Earth, Wind & Fire	Authentic	
"Mittelfinger"	2013	Prince Kay One	Rich Kidz	
"24/7"	2013	Prince Kay One	Rich Kidz	
"I'll Be Fine"	2013	Bizzy Crook	84	

=== Music videos ===
Title	Year	Other artist(s)	Director(s)	Ref.
As a lead artist
"Lipstick&Guilt"	2012	—N/a	Dano Cerny; Marielle Tepper	
"Smoking Gun"	2012	—N/a	Dano Cerny; Marielle Tepper	
"Someone to Believe"	2012	—N/a	Yaro	
"Bulletproof"	2012	Bobby Newberry	Don Tyler	
"Goodbye"	2015	Bobby Newberry	Noel Maitland	
Guest appearances
"Slow Dance"	2009	Keri Hilson	Chris Robinson	
"Don't Wanna Go Home"	2010	Jason Derulo	Rich Lee	
"Ballin"	2013	Fat Joe; Wiz Khalifa; Teyana Taylor	Elf Rivera	

== Filmography ==
=== Film ===
Title	Year	Role	Notes	Ref.
Be Cool	2005	Herself	Uncredited cameo	
Holiday Twist	2023	Brenda		

=== Television ===
Title	Year	Role	Notes	Ref.
Keeping Up with the Kardashians	2007	Herself	Episode: "Birthday Suit"	
Bank of Hollywood	2009	Judge	Season 1	
Popstar to Operastar	2011	Contestant	Series 2	
Last Chance: Girl Group	2015	Herself	Unaired pilot	
Celebs Go Dating	2017	Contestant	Series 2	
Celebrity Island with Bear Grylls	2017	Contestant	Series 2	
Dancing on Ice	2019	Contestant	Series 11	
The Masked Singer Australia	2022	Mirrorball	Season 4	
The Masked Singer UK	2024	Maypole	Series 5	

== Stage credits ==
Title	Year	Role	Notes	Ref.
The Bodyguard	2017	Rachel Marron	China tour	
Rip It Up – The 70s	2019	—N/a	UK tour	
Cinderella	2019–2020	Cinderella	New Wimbledon Theatre	
The Bodyguard	2023	Rachel Marron	UK and Ireland tour	

== Awards and nominations ==
Award	Year	Work	Category	Result	Ref.
Grammy Awards	2007	"Stickwitu"	Best Pop Performance by a Duo or Group with Vocals	Nominated	

== See also ==
- List of Afro-Latinos
