= P.O.Y.B.L =

Debut mixtape by Melody Thornton

Mixtape by Melody Thornton
- Released: March 15, 2012
- Recorded: 2010–2012
- Genres: R&B; hip hop; soul
- Length: 28:14
- Label: Independent
- Producers: Thornton; Kanye West; Mike Dean; Andre Harris; Church and State; Mark Vintin

Melody Thornton chronology
P.O.Y.B.L (2012)	Lioness Eyes (2020)

Singles from P.O.Y.B.L
- 1. "Lipstick & Guilt" Released: March 15, 2012; 2. "Smoking Gun" Released: April 2, 2012; 3. "Someone to Believe" Released: April 12, 2012; 4. "Bulletproof" Released: May 24, 2012

P.O.Y.B.L (Piss on Your Black List) is the debut mixtape by American singer Melody Thornton.

== Background ==
In June 2010, Rap-Up reported that Melody Thornton, a member of girl group the Pussycat Dolls, had departed from the group and was working on her solo album. In an interview for The Source, Thornton explained that her songs will be different from the group’s sound but she's not going to abandon that pop demographic that she acquired through the Pussycat Dolls.

"[...] But it's not popular-for-the-moment, the kind of music that I'm making. It's live instrumentation and it derives from '60s influences. It's just kind of what I was raised on, James Brown, B.B. King-ish as far as instrumentation goes. But vocally, I admire Mariah Carey and was raised on Aretha Franklin, Jackson 5 and all of that, so it's not going to be like Pussycat Dolls at all."

“After the Dolls, I let everything go and took some much needed time to put myself back together,” Thornton told Rap-Up. “We worked liked machines and there was little time for maintenance, so I’ve spent the past two years just writing, relaxing, and discovering my musical self without limitations. My amazing fans and supporters have been patiently waiting to hear the REAL Melody Thornton and this is my thank you. I’ve written so many songs and P.O.Y.B.L is the first project of many.”

== Composition ==
"P.O.Y.B.L" is a traditional rhythm and blues, soul, and pop album, influenced by other artists such as Mariah Carey, James Brown, B.B. King, Aretha Franklin, and Jackson 5. The mixtape features a distinct retro sound, while its instrumentation is that of popular 1960s and 1970s rhythm and blues. Speaking of the mixtape, Thornton said “Piss on Your Black List has nothing to do with being a rebel or fighting against anything. It has everything to do with fighting for myself. It's clever with attitude. It's kind of funny and gets a strong reaction; all things that, at times, describe my art.”

== Track listing ==
No.	Title	Writer(s)	Producer(s)	Length
1.	"Intro"	Melody Thornton	Mark Vinten	1:28
2.	"Sweet Vendetta"	Thornton	Church and State	3:43
3.	"Lipstick & Guilt"	Thornton	88-Keys, Kanye West, Mike Dean	2:53
4.	"Smoking Gun"	Thornton	Andre Harris	1:47
5.	"Loving You Better"	Thornton		4:32
6.	"Crazy Mixed Girl"	Thornton		1:15
7.	"The One That Got Away"	Thornton		4:10
8.	"Bulletproof" (featuring Bobby Newberry)	Elly Jackson, Ben Langmaid	Elly Jackson, Ben Langmaid	3:52
9.	"Someone to Believe"	Thornton		2:01
10.	"Hit the Ground Runnin'"	Thornton	Thornton	4:33
Total length:				28:14
