= The Masked Singer (Australian TV series) season 4 =

The Masked Singer
- Season 4
- Presented by: Osher Günsberg
- Judges: Mel B; Dave Hughes; Abbie Chatfield; Chrissie Swan
- No. of contestants: 12
- Winner: Melody Thornton as "Mirrorball"
- Runner-up: Sheldon Riley as "Snapdragon"
- No. of episodes: 11

Release
- Original network: Network 10
- Original release: 7 August – 28 August 2022

Season chronology
- ← Previous; Season 3 Next → Season 5

The fourth season of The Masked Singer Australia was announced in October 2021 and premiered on Network 10 on 7 August 2022. In the Grand Finale on 28 August 2022, The winner was revealed to be Melody Thornton as “Mirrorball”, the runner-up was Sheldon Riley as “Snapdragon”, and third place was Hugh Sheridan as “Rooster”.

The fourth series was filmed with a live audience between 30 June and 20 July 2022.

== Production ==
The costumes were designed and created by Australian Academy Award and BAFTA Award-Winning costume designer Tim Chappel, who is best known for his work on The Adventures of Priscilla, Queen of the Desert with Lizzy Gardiner.

== Panellists and host ==
Only comedian Dave Hughes remained on the panel after the show's previous panelists left. British singer-songwriter Mel B, TV personality Abbie Chatfield and radio personality Chrissie Swan joined Hughes as panelists. Osher Günsberg returned as host.

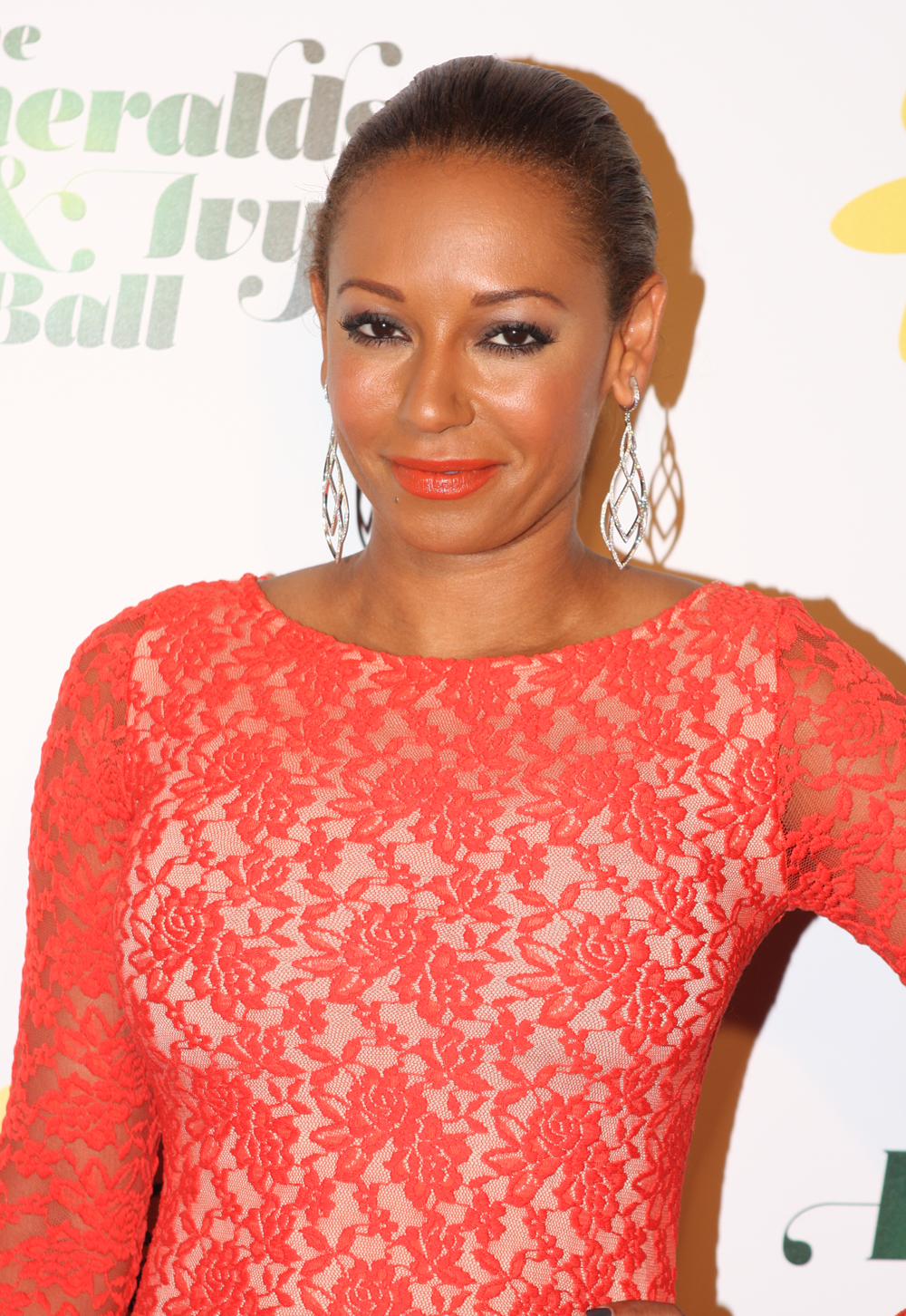
Mel B

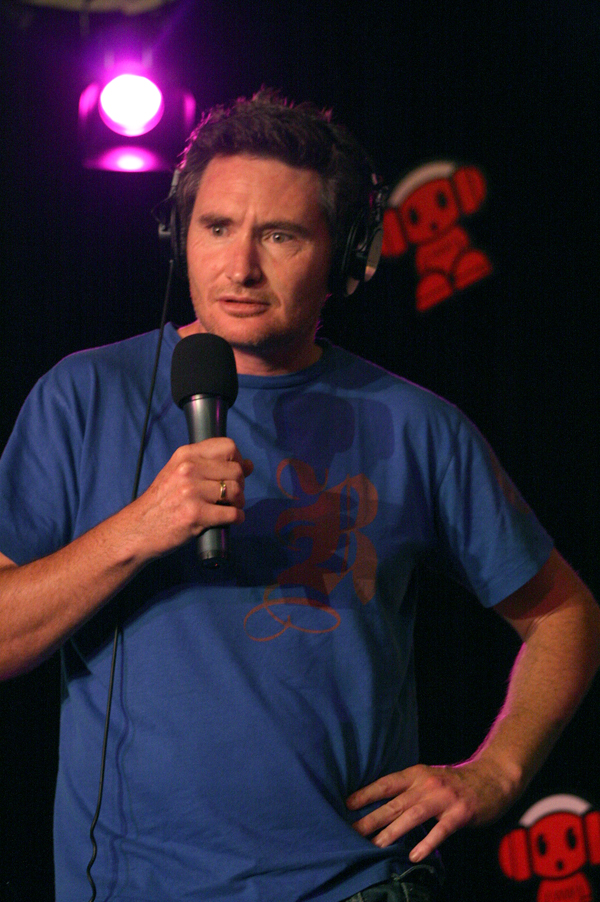
Dave Hughes

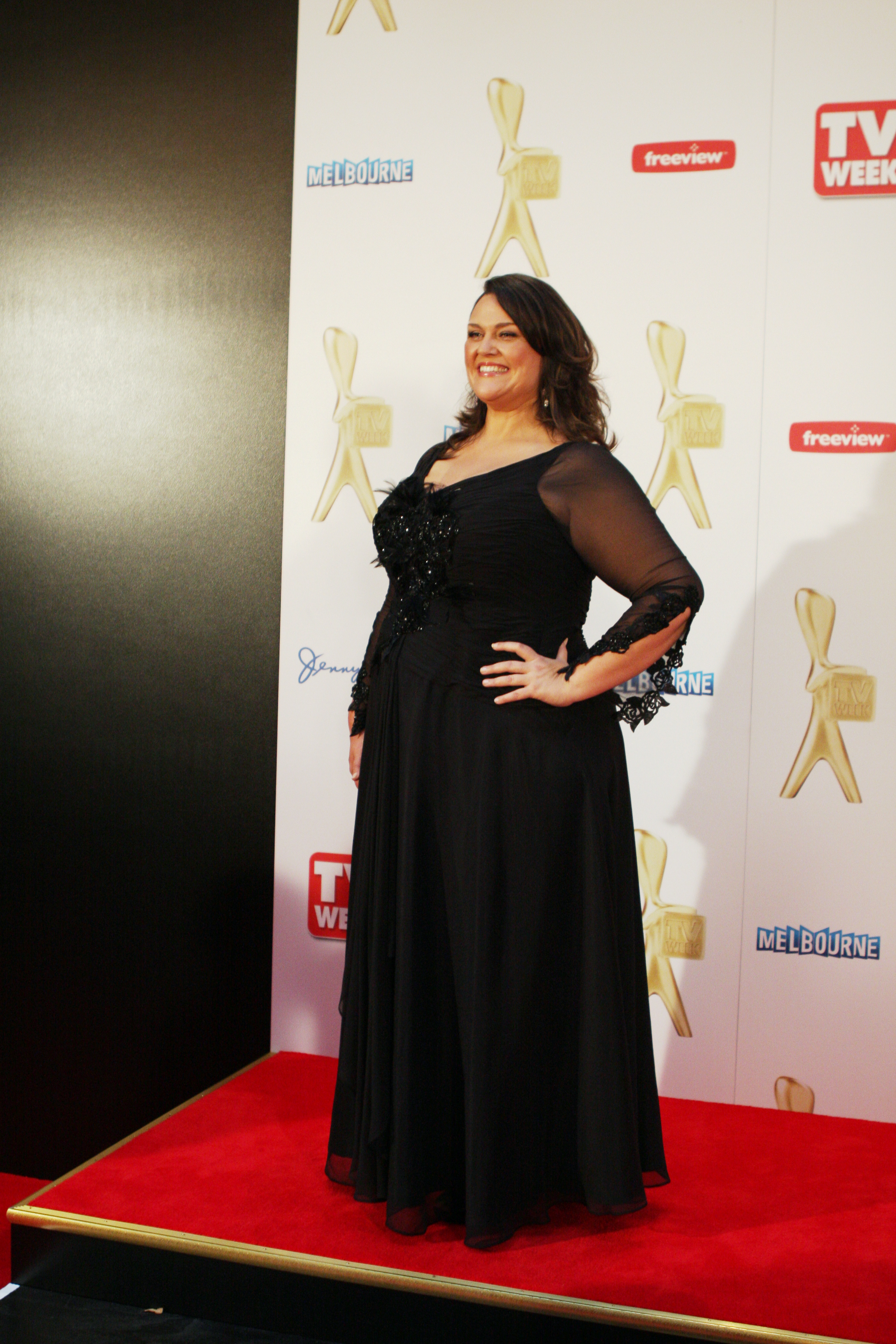
Chrissie Swan

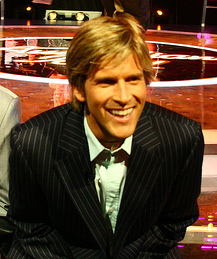
Osher Günsberg

== Contestants ==
Before the season began, Network Ten revealed that the cast included a Grammy Award winner, a gold medalist, a singer with more than 50 million records sold and a multiple Logie Award winner.

This is the first season to feature "Wild Card" contestants. Further explained in the premiere episode, it was revealed that two of the twelve contestants would perform later in the competition, similar to the format of the fifth American season.

Like the previous season, a special guest mask, "Poodle", appeared for one night. Poodle was revealed to be Tori Spelling, who also appeared as Unicorn on the first American season.

Stage name	Identity	Occupation	Episodes									
Stage name	Identity	Occupation	1	2	3	4	5	6	7	8	9	11
Mirrorball	Melody Thornton	Singer	SAFE		SAFE		SAFE		SAFE	SAFE	SAFE	WINNER
Snapdragon	Sheldon Riley	Singer		SAFE		SAFE		SAFE	SAFE	SAFE	SAFE	RUNNER-UP
Rooster	Hugh Sheridan	Actor		SAFE		SAFE		SAFE	SAFE	SAFE	SAFE	THIRD
Microphone (WC)	Michelle Williams	Singer/actress					SAFE		SAFE	SAFE	OUT	
Blowfly	Shannon Noll	Singer	SAFE		RISK		SAFE		SAFE	OUT		
Popcorn	Sam Sparro	Singer		SAFE		RISK		SAFE	OUT			
Gnome (WC)	Matt Preston	Food Critic/TV Personality						OUT				
Zombie	Emma Watkins	Singer/TV Presenter	SAFE		SAFE		OUT					
Tiger	Jamie Durie	Horticulturist		SAFE		OUT						
Thong	Pia Miranda	Actress	SAFE		OUT							
Caterpillar	Lisa Curry	Swimmer		OUT								
Knight	Ryan Moloney	Actor	OUT									

The masked singer was in the bottom two but won their duel, and was not eliminated.
The masked singer was safe from elimination.
The masked singer was eliminated from the competition and unmasked upon their elimination.
The masked singer did not perform.

(WC) This masked singer is a wildcard contestant.

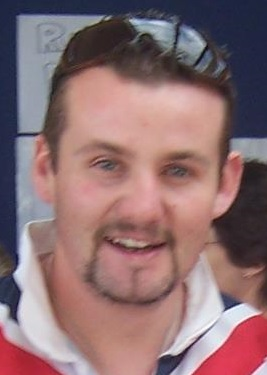
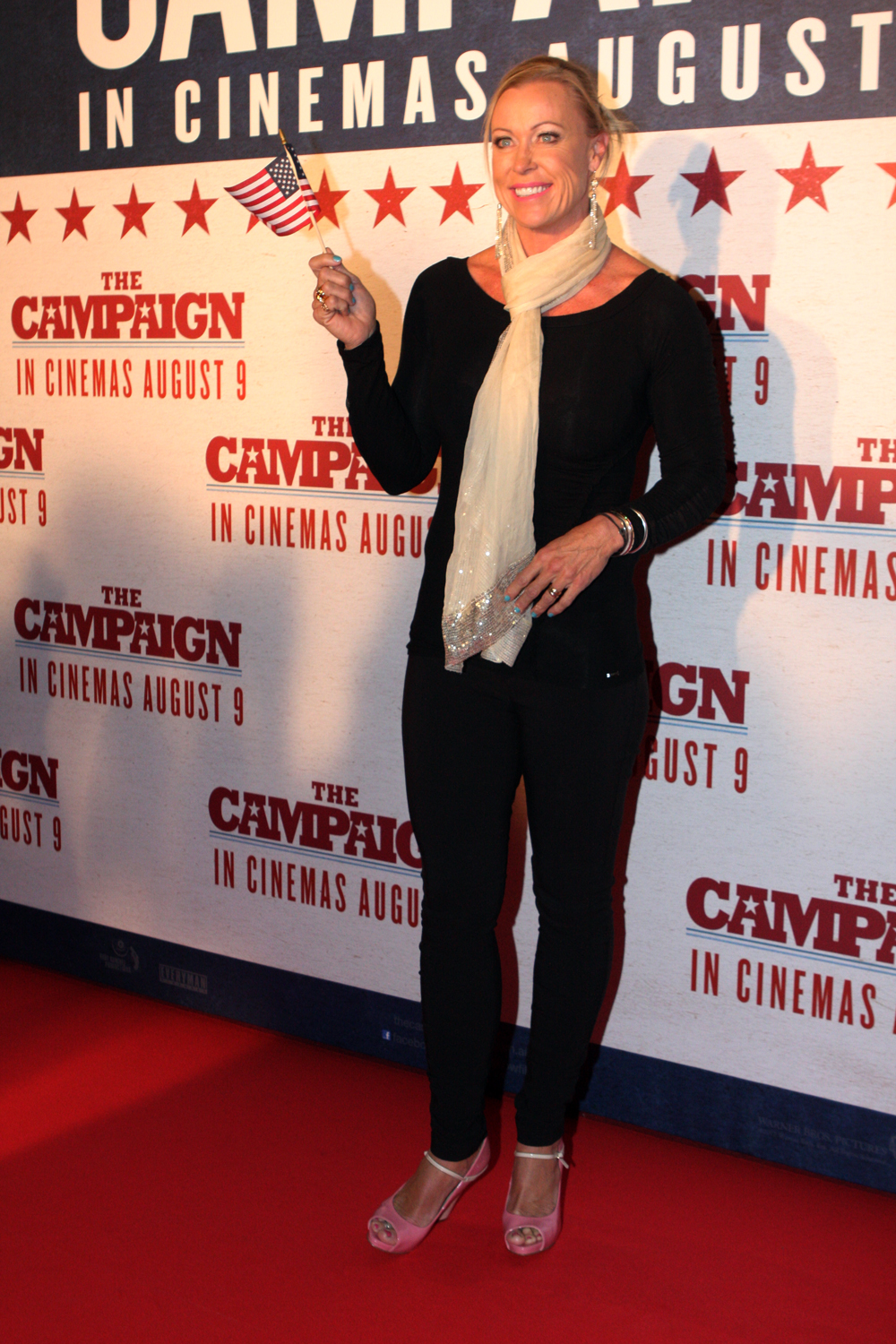
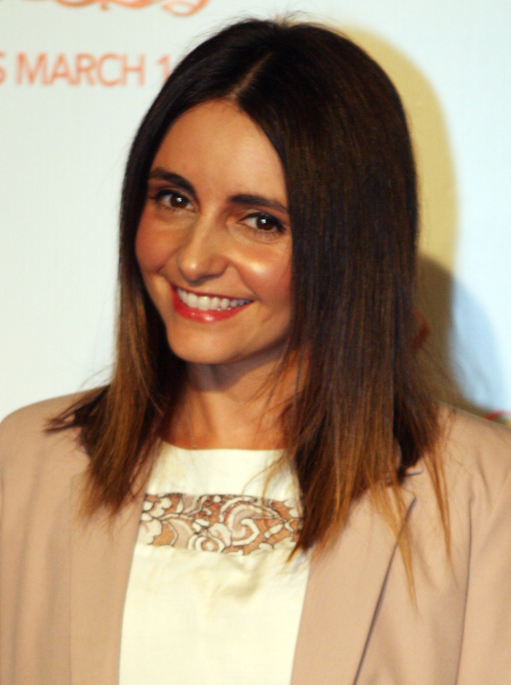
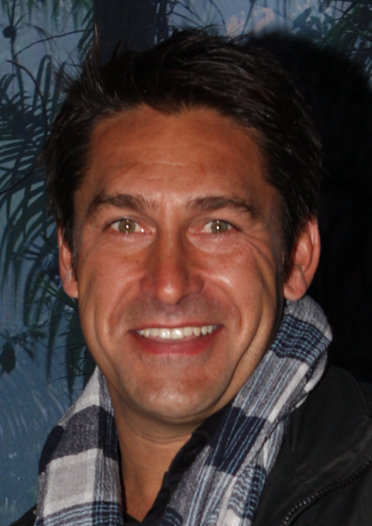
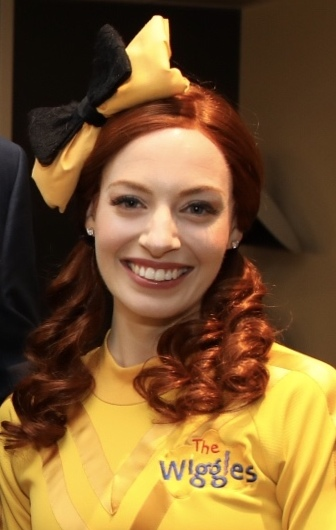
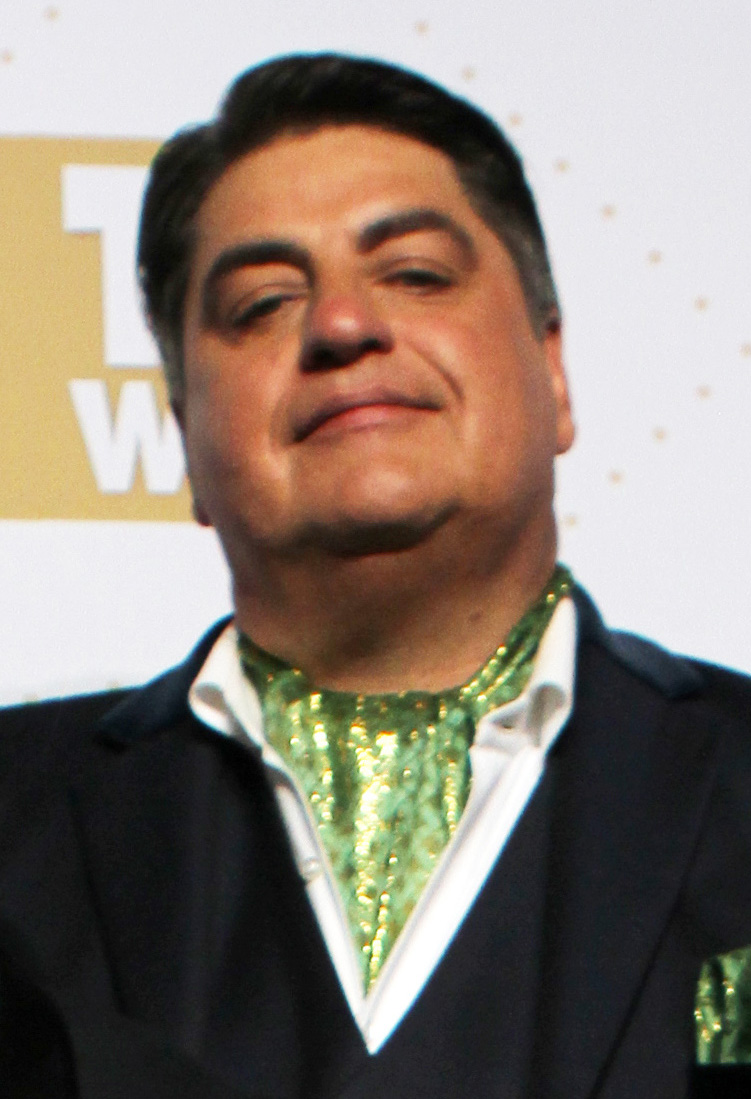
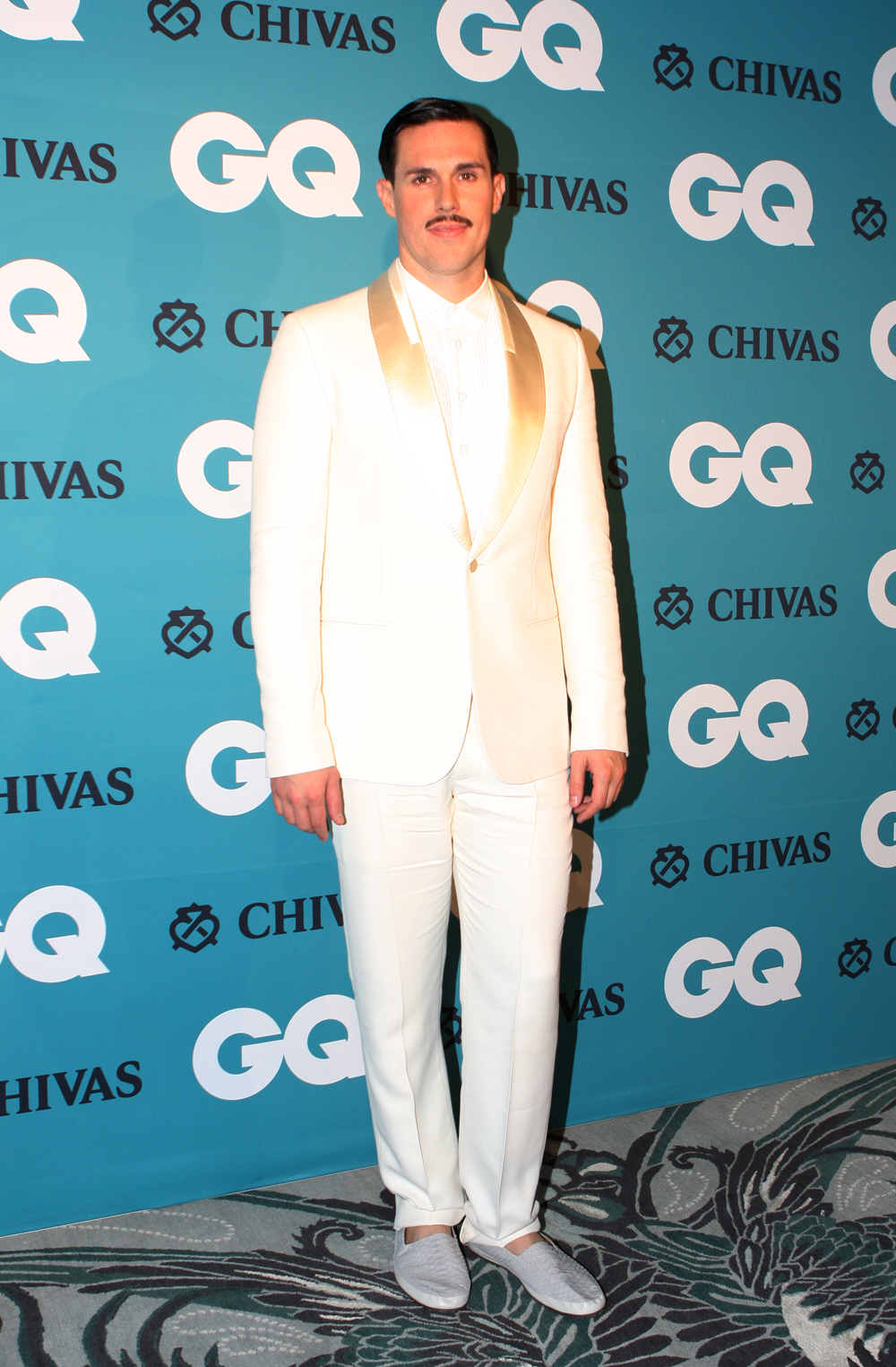
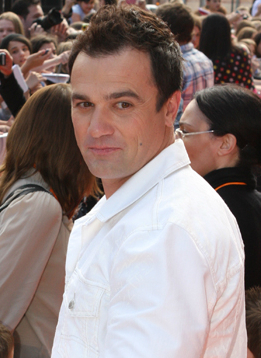
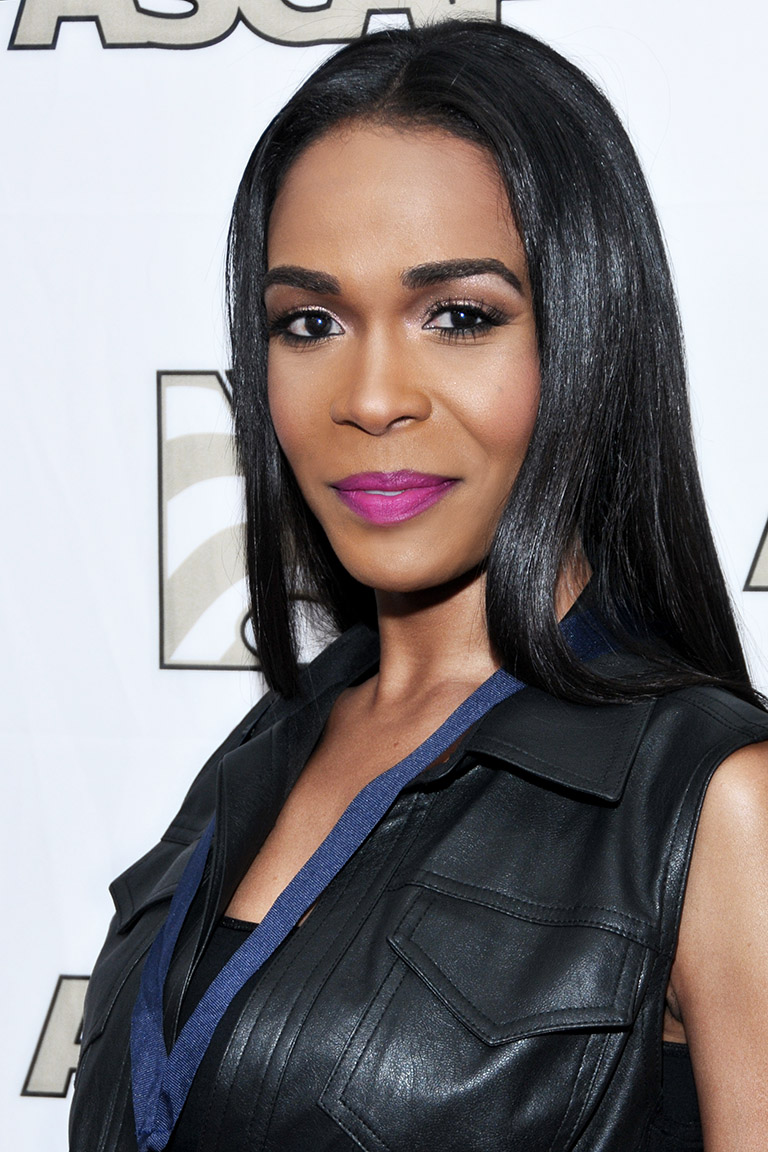
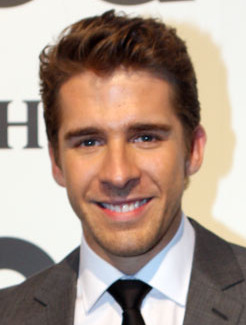
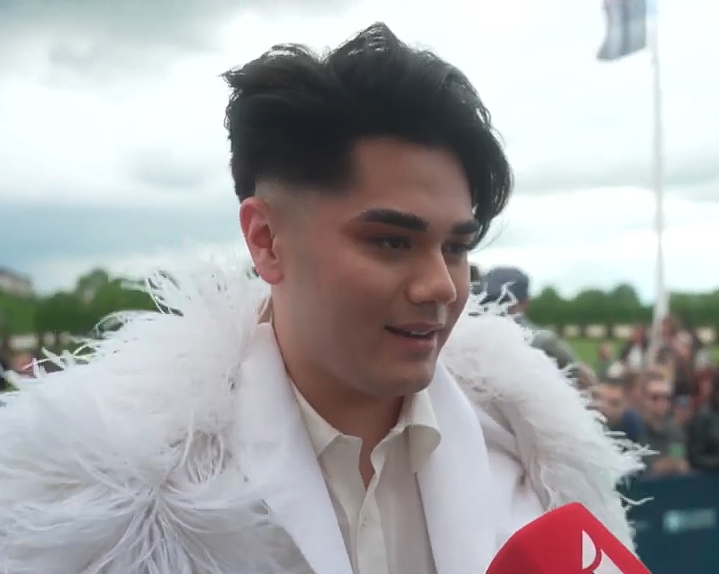
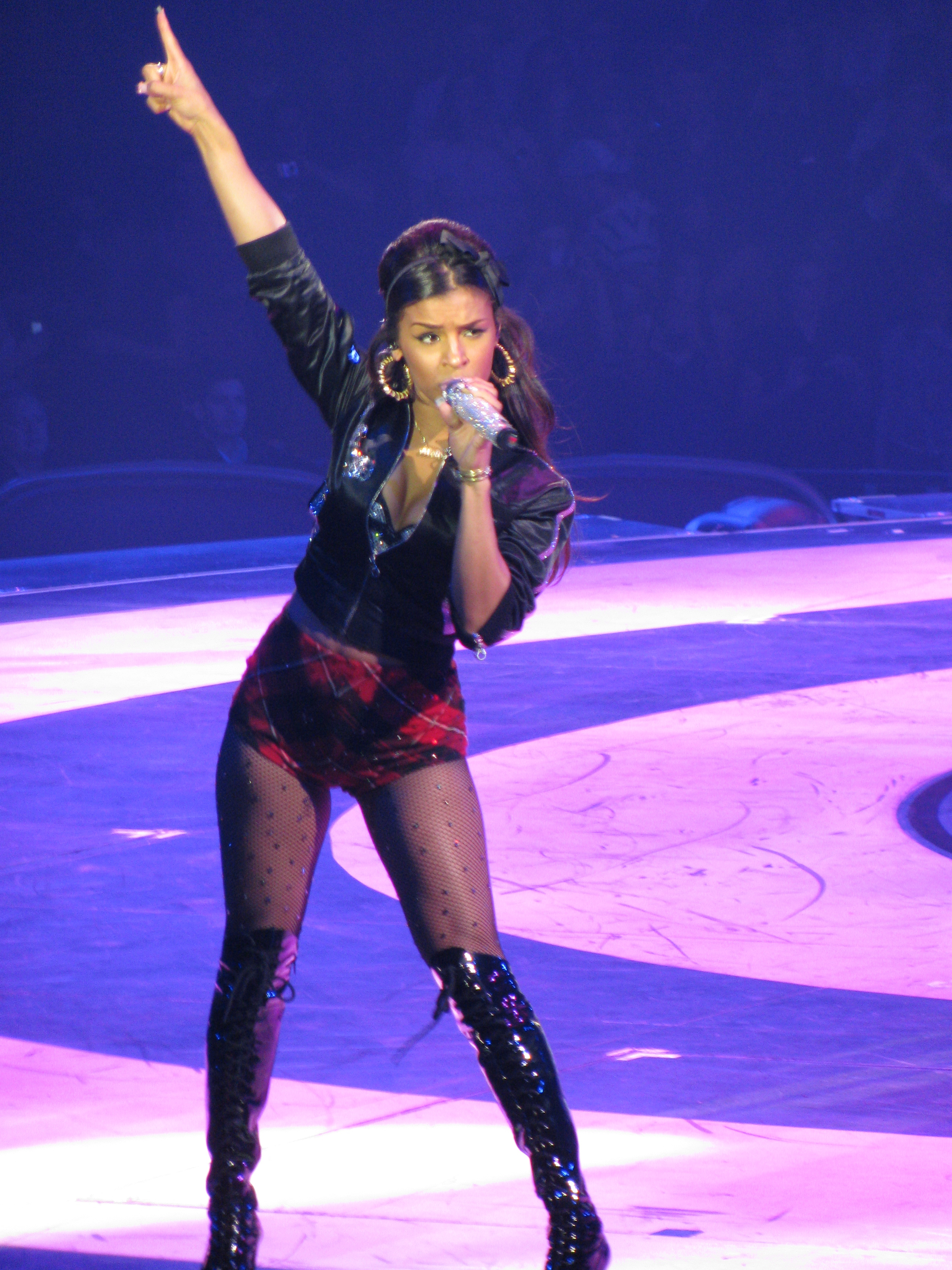
The celebrities who competed in the fourth season of The Masked Singer, pictured in order of elimination (l-r):
Ryan Moloney ("Knight"), Lisa Curry ("Caterpillar"), Pia Miranda ("Thong"), Jamie Durie ("Tiger"), Emma Watkins ("Zombie"), Matt Preston ("Gnome"), Sam Sparro ("Popcorn"), Shannon Noll ("Blowfly"), Michelle Williams ("Microphone"), Hugh Sheridan ("Rooster"), Sheldon Riley ("Snapdragon") and Melody Thornton ("Mirrorball")

== Episodes ==
=== Episode 1 (7 August) ===
Performances on the first episode
#	Stage name	Song	Identity	Result
1	Blowfly	"Midnight Sky" by Miley Cyrus	undisclosed	SAFE
2	Mirrorball	"Xanadu" by Olivia Newton-John	undisclosed	SAFE
3	Zombie	"Sweet but Psycho" by Ava Max	undisclosed	SAFE
4	Thong	"Footloose" by Kenny Loggins	undisclosed	SAFE
5	Knight	"Bad Habits" by Ed Sheeran	Ryan Moloney	OUT

=== Episode 2 (8 August) ===
Performances on the second episode
#	Stage name	Song	Identity	Result
1	Rooster	"24K Magic" by Bruno Mars	undisclosed	SAFE
2	Tiger	"Feeling Good" by Nina Simone	undisclosed	SAFE
3	Snapdragon	"Sorry Not Sorry" by Demi Lovato	undisclosed	SAFE
4	Caterpillar	"Cloudy Day" by Tones and I	Lisa Curry	OUT
5	Popcorn	"I Don't Feel Like Dancin'" by Scissor Sisters	undisclosed	SAFE

=== Episode 3 (9 August) ===
Performances on the third episode
#	Stage name	Song	Result	
1	Mirrorball	"I Wanna Dance with Somebody" by Whitney Houston	SAFE	
2	Zombie	"Maneater" by Nelly Furtado	SAFE	
3	Blowfly	"Easy on Me" by Adele & Chris Stapleton	RISK	
4	Thong	"So What" by P!nk	RISK	
Duel			Identity	Result
1	Blowfly	"Hit Me with Your Best Shot" by Pat Benatar	undisclosed	SAFE
2	Thong	"Hit Me with Your Best Shot" by Pat Benatar	Pia Miranda	OUT

=== Episode 4 (14 August) ===
Performances on the fourth episode
#	Stage name	Song	Result	
1	Rooster	"California Dreamin'" by The Mamas & the Papas	SAFE	
2	Snapdragon	"How Will I Know" by Whitney Houston	SAFE	
3	Popcorn	"Adore You" by Harry Styles	RISK	
4	Tiger	"In the Air Tonight" by Phil Collins	RISK	
Duel			Identity	Result
1	Popcorn	"I'm Still Standing" by Elton John	undisclosed	SAFE
2	Tiger	"I'm Still Standing" by Elton John	Jamie Durie	OUT

=== Episode 5 (15 August) ===
- Group number: "Absolutely Everybody" by Vanessa Amorosi

Performances on the fifth episode
#	Stage name	Song	Identity	Result
Wildcard	Microphone	"Ain't Nobody" by Chaka Khan	undisclosed	SAFE
2	Zombie	"Creep" by Radiohead	Emma Watkins	OUT
3	Blowfly	"Chains" by Tina Arena	undisclosed	SAFE
4	Mirrorball	"Always" by Bon Jovi	undisclosed	SAFE

=== Episode 6 (16 August) ===
- Group Number: "Love Is In The Air" by John Paul Young

Performances on the sixth episode
#	Stage name	Song	Identity	Result
Wildcard	Gnome	"I'm a Believer" by The Monkees	Matt Preston	OUT
2	Snapdragon	"Therefore I Am" by Billie Eilish	undisclosed	SAFE
3	Rooster	"Don't Stop Me Now" by Queen	undisclosed	SAFE
4	Popcorn	"Cold Heart" by Elton John & Dua Lipa	undisclosed	SAFE

=== Episode 7 (21 August) ===
Performances on the seventh episode
#	Stage name	Song	Identity	Result
1	Mirrorball	"Levitating" by Dua Lipa & DaBaby	undisclosed	SAFE
2	Popcorn	"Over The Rainbow" by Judy Garland	Sam Sparro	OUT
3	Blowfly	"Stay" by The Kid LAROI & Justin Bieber	undisclosed	SAFE
4	Snapdragon	"Strong" by London Grammar	undisclosed	SAFE
5	Microphone	"Heroes (We Could Be)" by Alesso feat. Tove Lo	undisclosed	SAFE
6	Rooster	"Pure Imagination" by Gene Wilder	undisclosed	SAFE

=== Episode 8 (22 August) ===
Performances on the eighth episode
#	Stage name	Song	Identity	Result
1	Microphone	"Say Something" by A Great Big World & Christina Aguilera	undisclosed	SAFE
2	Blowfly	“You Give Love A Bad Name” by Bon Jovi	Shannon Noll	OUT
3	Mirrorball	"Without You" by The Kid LAROI & Miley Cyrus	undisclosed	SAFE
4	Rooster	"Shivers" by Ed Sheeran	undisclosed	SAFE
5	Snapdragon	"Stay" by Rihanna feat. Mikky Ekko	undisclosed	SAFE

=== Episode 9 (23 August) ===
- Group Number: "Best Day of My Life" by American Authors

Performances on the ninth episode
#	Stage name	Song	Identity	Result
1	Mirrorball	"Fantasy" by Earth, Wind & Fire	undisclosed	SAFE
2	Snapdragon	"Valerie" by Amy Winehouse	undisclosed	SAFE
3	Rooster	"Beneath Your Beautiful" by Labrinth	undisclosed	SAFE
4	Microphone	"Don't Stop Believin'" by Journey	Michelle Williams	OUT

=== Episode 10 (24 August) ===
Performances on the tenth episode
#	Stage name	Song	Identity
1	Poodle	"Material Girl" by Madonna	Tori Spelling
1	Poodle	"Somewhere Only We Know" by Keane	Tori Spelling

=== Episode 11 (28 August) - Finale ===
- Group number: "Firework" by Katy Perry

Performances on the eleventh episode
#	Stage name	Song	Identity	Result
1	Snapdragon	"Never Enough" by Loren Allred	Sheldon Riley	RUNNER-UP
2	Rooster	"Everybody Wants to Rule the World" by Tears for Fears	Hugh Sheridan	THIRD
3	Mirrorball	"Last Dance" by Donna Summer	Melody Thornton	WINNER

== Reception ==
=== Ratings ===
No.	Title	Air date	Timeslot	Overnight ratings		Consolidated ratings		Total viewers	Ref(s)
No.	Title	Air date	Timeslot	Viewers	Rank	Viewers	Rank	Total viewers	Ref(s)
1	Episode 1 Mask Reveal	7 August 2022	Sunday 7:30 pm	522,000 598,000	7 5	76,000 78,000	8 5	598,000 676,000	
2	Episode 2 Mask Reveal	8 August 2022	Monday 7:30 pm	455,000 605,000	13 8	61,000 60,000	14 7	516,000 665,000	
3	Episode 3 Mask Reveal	9 August 2022	Tuesday 7:30 pm	449,000 504,000	13 10	71,000 53,000	12 11	520,000 557,000	
4	Episode 4 Mask Reveal	14 August 2022	Sunday 7:30 pm	437,000 549,000	9 5	51,000 56,000	8 5	488,000 605,000	
5	Episode 5 Mask Reveal	15 August 2022	Monday 7:30 pm	445,000 526,000	15 11	67,000 59,000	17 14	512,000 585,000	
6	Episode 6 Mask Reveal	16 August 2022	Tuesday 7:30 pm	494,000 557,000	10 9	67,000 66,000	12 8	561,000 623,000	
7	Episode 7 Mask Reveal	21 August 2022	Sunday 7:30 pm	451,000 568,000	11 6	47,000 41,000	10 7	498,000 609,000	
8	Episode 8 Mask Reveal	22 August 2022	Monday 7:30 pm	491,000 612,000	13 9	58,000 63,000	15 8	549,000 675,000	
9	Episode 9 Mask Reveal	23 August 2022	Tuesday 7:30 pm	476,000 582,000	10 8	41,000 51,000	13 8	517,000 633,000	
10	Episode 10 Mask Reveal	24 August 2022	Wednesday 7:30 pm	420,000 440,000	15 13	78,000 81,000	13 10	498,000 521,000	
11	Grand Finale The Final Reveal	28 August 2022	Sunday 7:30 pm	575,000 713,000	7 4	37,000 44,000	7 5	612,000 757,000	
