= Lyn Macdonald =

British military historian (1929–2021)

Evelyn Mary Macdonald (31 May 1929 – 1 March 2021) was a British military historian, one of relatively few women in the field. Macdonald was best known for a series of books on the First World War that draw on first hand accounts of surviving veterans.

== Life ==
Macdonald lived near Cambridge, England, and worked as a BBC radio producer until 1973, when she began working on a documentary with the Old Comrades Association of the 13th (Service) Battalion of the Rifle Brigade, who were visiting the battlefields of the Western Front. The first of her influential books took its title, They Called It Passchendaele, from a poem by Siegfried Sassoon. Other works included Somme. In 1988, she led a party of veterans to the Western Front, accompanied by Sebastian Faulks, who was inspired by the experience to write his novel Birdsong.

Macdonald bequeathed an archive of about 600 recordings of interviews with veterans of the First World War to the Imperial War Museum.

== Works ==
- How to be a Supercook and Work as Well (1976).
- They Called It Passchendaele (1978).
- French Cooking Without Tears (1979).
- The Roses of No Man's Land (1980).
- Somme (1983).
- 1914: The Days of Hope (1987).
- 1914-1918: Voices and Images of the Great War (1988).
- 1915: The Death of Innocence (1993).
- To the Last Man: Spring 1918 (1998).
- Ordeal By Fire: Witnesses to the Great War (editor, 2001).
- At the Going Down of the Sun: 365 Soldiers from the Great War (Lannoo, Tielt., 2001), with Ian Connerty, Sir Martin Gilbert, Peter Hart and Nigel Steel.
