= Jibbs =

American rapper (born 1990)

- Born: Jovan Camaran Campbell; November 13, 1990 (age 35); St. Louis, Missouri, U.S.
- Genre: Hip hop
- Occupation: Rapper
- Years active: 2005–present
- Label: Geffen Records
- Website: www.jibbsnation.com

Jovan Camaran Campbell (born November 13, 1990), better known by his stage name Jibbs, is an American rapper. He is best known for his 2006 hit single "Chain Hang Low". Jibbs's only other song that charted on the Billboard Hot 100 was "King Kong" (featuring Chamillionaire). Both songs proceeded his debut album Jibbs Featuring Jibbs, released October of that same year to moderately commercial response, despite mixed critical reception.

== Biography ==
Jibbs was born in St. Louis, Missouri. He began rapping at a young age in order to impress his older brother DJ Beatz who, at this time, gained notoriety thanks to his collaboration with high-profile St. Louis rappers such as Nelly and Chingy.

Jibbs subsequently signed with Geffen Records and released his debut album Jibbs feat. Jibbs on October 24, 2006. His debut single from the album, "Chain Hang Low", became the most downloaded rap song in August 2006.

In 2007, after filming the music video for "Smile", he took part in the Price of Fame tour with Bow Wow and Lloyd.

In November 2008, Jibbs signed to Akon's Konvict Muzik and Dr. Dre's Aftermath Entertainment.

In June 2012, Jibbs released a free album titled Back 2 The American Dream.

== Discography ==
=== Studio albums ===
List of studio albums, with selected chart positions
Title	Album details	Peak chart positions		
Title	Album details	US	US R&B	US Rap
Jibbs Featuring Jibbs	Released: October 24, 2006; Label: Geffen; Format: CD, digital download	11	8	4

=== Mixtapes ===
- Round One (2009; hosted by DJ Twin)
- Round Two (2011; hosted by DJ Twin & DJ 1Hunnit)

=== Singles ===
List of singles, with selected chart positions and certifications
Title	Year	Peak chart positions						Certifications	Album
Title	Year	US	US R&B	US Rap	AUS	NZ	UK	Certifications	Album
"Chain Hang Low"	2006	7	16	6	87	3	63	RIAA: Platinum	Jibbs Featuring Jibbs
"King Kong" (featuring Chamillionaire)	2006	54	32	16	—	—	—		Jibbs Featuring Jibbs
"Go Too Far" (featuring Melody Thornton)	2007	—	—	—	—	17	126		Jibbs Featuring Jibbs
"Smile" (featuring Fabo)	2007	—	120	—	—	—	—		Jibbs Featuring Jibbs
"The Dedication (Ay DJ)" (featuring Lloyd)	2009	—	85	—	—	—	—		Round One
"Runnin' Thru 100"	2016	—	—	—	—	—	—		Non-album single
