= Doll Domination – The Mini Collection =

EP by The Pussycat Dolls
- Released: April 24, 2009
- Studios: Atlanta (Zac Studio); Copenhagen (Cutfather Studios); Hollywood (Conway Recording); Los Angeles (Chalice Recording, Henson Recording); Orlando (2nd Floor Studios); Santa Monica (The Boiler Room); Stockholm (Quiz & Larossi Studios)
- Genres: Pop; R&B
- Length: 23:03
- Labels: Interscope; Polydor
- Producers: Cutfather; Polow da Don; Jonas Jeberg; Rodney Jerkins; Osinachi Nwaneri; Quiz & Larossi; A. R. Rahman

The Pussycat Dolls chronology
Doll Domination (2008)	Doll Domination – The Mini Collection (2009)	Celebrating Pride: The Pussycat Dolls (2022)

Singles from Doll Domination – The Mini Collection
- 1. "Jai Ho! (You Are My Destiny)" Released: February 23, 2009; 2. "Hush Hush; Hush Hush" Released: May 12, 2009

Doll Domination – The Mini Collection is the second extended play (EP) by American girl group the Pussycat Dolls. It was released on April 24, 2009, by Interscope Records. The EP is an extension of the group's second studio album, Doll Domination (2008), including some previously released singles, such as "When I Grow Up", "Whatcha Think About That" and "I Hate This Part", as well as three new songs. The Mini Collection was one of several reissues released throughout 2009 as further promotion for the Doll Domination era, being released in between the European and Australasian legs of the group's Doll Domination Tour. It debuted at number nine on both the Scottish Albums Chart and UK Albums Chart, and would go on to be certified gold by the British Phonographic Industry (BPI) for sales of at least 100,000 in the United Kingdom.

The Mini Collection was preceded by the release of the single "Jai Ho! (You Are My Destiny)", an English language remake of A. R. Rahman's original Hindi song "Jai Ho!" from the soundtrack to the film Slumdog Millionaire (2008). The song topped several charts worldwide, including in Australia, Finland, Ireland, Israel and Romania, as well as reaching number three in the United Kingdom and number 15 on the Billboard Hot 100. "Hush Hush; Hush Hush" was released as the second single, and is a house music remix of the Doll Domination song "Hush Hush". The latter single was less successful, peaking in the top ten of several European record charts as well as in Australia, though it reached number 17 in the United Kingdom and number 73 in the United States.

"Jai Ho! (You Are My Destiny)" and "Hush Hush; Hush Hush" both attracted controversy for prominently featuring the group's lead singer Nicole Scherzinger, which ended up leading to a public outburst from the Pussycat Dolls' secondary lead vocalist Melody Thornton about the lack of attention that the other group members got. The release of the latter marked the last song to be promoted during the Doll Domination era and a subsequent hiatus was announced following the end of the Doll Domination Tour in September 2009. Later that year, the members of the group announced their departures one by one, which resulted in the eventual disbandment of the Pussycat Dolls by 2010. The Mini Collection and "Hush Hush; Hush Hush" would serve as the group's final album and single releases, respectively, until their reunion in 2019, going on to release their single, "React", in 2020.

== Background and release ==
In September 2009, lead singer Nicole Scherzinger confirmed that the Pussycat Dolls were exploring ways to continue promoting their second studio album Doll Domination (2008), during an interview with Billboard magazine's Gary Graff. He called the album a commercial disappointment, noting that it had sold less than 400,000 copies in the United States, at the same time as confirming that a re-release was set to be released under the title of Doll Domination 2.0. Scherzinger explained to Graff that "it's a new life, a new push for Doll Domination. In this industry these days, that's what we're trying to do, always put new music out there and get people to pay attention. So this is a way for people to get new songs of ours and for people who haven't picked up the album so far to get another spin of our music."

Beginning in April 2009, several reissues of Doll Domination were released, including "The Mini Collection, which is a six-track extended play (EP), the Doll Domination – Re-edition in Germany, Doll Domination 2.0 primarily in Australia, and Doll Domination 3.0 across Europe. A second EP version of the album was also released in Germany entitled Doll Domination – Re-edition EP which is similar to The Mini Collection but adds two further songs: including the Doll Domination single "Bottle Pop" (2009), which features Snoop Dogg, and the "We Love to Entertain You" mix of "Takin' Over the World". The EP also uses the original Doll Domination cover art. All of the reissues vary in length but share in common the inclusion of the Pussycat Dolls' then-most recent single "Jai Ho! (You Are My Destiny)" (2009), their new song "Painted Windows", and "Hush Hush; Hush Hush", a remix of the song "Hush Hush" that was included on the original release of Doll Domination.

== Music and lyrics ==
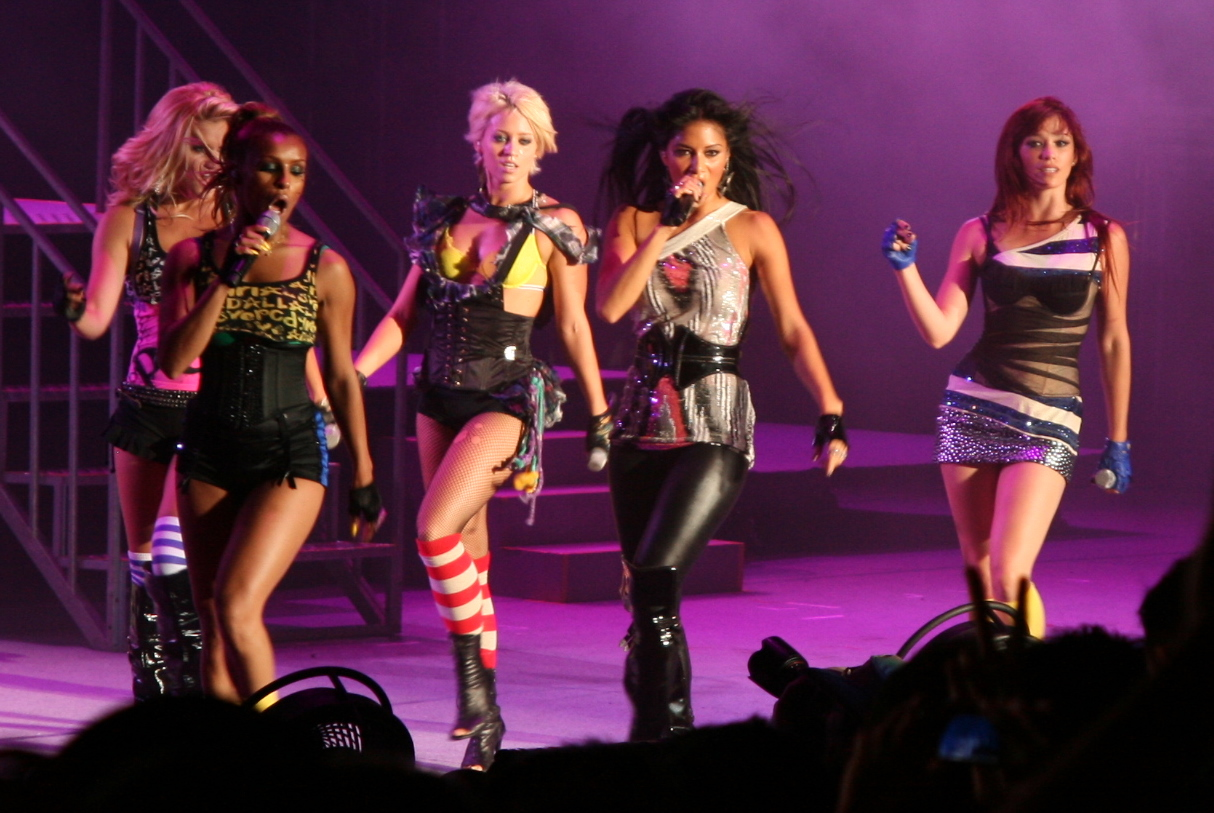
The Mini Collection was released while the group were on their Doll Domination Tour (pictured above) and appearing as a support act on Britney Spears' Circus Tour.

Doll Domination – The Mini Collection is a six-song extended play that has a length of 26 minutes and 3 seconds, featuring a mixture of newly recorded/released songs and previous singles from Doll Domination. The former was released on April 24, 2009, and includes "Jai Ho! (You Are My Destiny)", "Painted Windows", and the remix song "Hush Hush; Hush Hush", a new version of the original song "Hush Hush" included on Doll Domination. The remainder of the EP comprises the group's 2008 singles, "When I Grow Up", "Whatcha Think About That" and "I Hate This Part".

The Mini Collection was preceded by the single release of a brand new song, "Jai Ho! (You Are My Destiny)", which is an English language remake of the original Hindi song "Jai Ho" that was included on the soundtrack to the film Slumdog Millionaire (2008). Speaking about how the song was created, co-writer Evan Kidd Bogart said that "they [ Fair and Iovine ] wanted to get a bunch of different versions to see who could nail a version for the Pussycat Dolls." He recalled that once all interpretations were complete, "they [Fair and Iovine] took parts of The Writing Camp version, parts of Ester Dean's version, and parts of another version, and they put them together, and then Nicole [Scherzinger] and Ron [Fair] filled in the blanks that they thought were missing". Bogart additionally stated that it was "a very unique and awkward way of writing a song". Scherzinger, Fair, Dean, Bogart, Erika Nuri, David Quiñones, Candace Thorbourne, and Nailah and Nyanda Thorbourne received credit for writing the track, while its production was handled by Fair and Scherzinger. The song was recorded in London, with Scherzinger and A.R. Rahman corresponding via webcam. Scherzinger's version replaces the original's Hindi words with English lyrics, including the chorus, "You are the reason that I breathe/ You are the reason that I still believe/ You are my destiny/ Jai ho." Stephanie Nolen of The Globe and Mail described the lyrics as "racier than the original Hindi words "by Indian poet Gulzar"."

"When I Grow Up" is an uptempo electropop song, built around "bouncy synth lines" and a "thudding" bassline and alongside heavy usage of sirens, handclaps and pitch-shifted vocals. According to The New York Times's Jon Pareles, Scherzinger adopts similar vocal stylings on the song to Britney Spears with her "breathiness against the song's sirens, shouts and pumping beat". Ironically, the song was originally written with Spears in mind but was rejected by her record label Jive Records at the time of the creation of Spears' fifth studio album Blackout (2007). Scherzinger then recorded the song for her own debut studio album, before deciding it was a better fit for the Pussycat Dolls. Once "When I Grow Up" was given to Scherzinger, and eventually the Pussycat Dolls, it was reworked and recorded by Paul Foley, "Mike "Handz" Donaldson, and Roberto "Tito" Vazquez at 2nd Floor Studios in Orlando, Florida and Chalice Studios, and mixed by Spike Stent and Rodney "Darkchild" Jerkins at Chalice Studios in Los Angeles. The Yardbirds' drummer Jim McCarty and bassist Paul Samwell-Smith both received co-writing credits on the song, as a result of its sample of "He's Always There" (1966). The song was described by the Los Angeles Times as the album's ideological centrepiece.Writing for the newspaper, August Brown, Mikael Wood and Randy Lewis said, "Built off a filling-loosening house beat and the Dolls' smug cackling, it's so shameless in its celebration of the monoculture of moneyed youth that it transcends taste. It's more of a '95 Theses' as penned by Kim Kardashian and nailed to Viacom's front door with the shards of a broken BlackBerry – we demand to be on TV; to drive nice cars; to have groupies." These themes were noticed by Yahoo! Music's Jaime Gill, who called "When I Grow Up" a "dark, dissonant club banger".

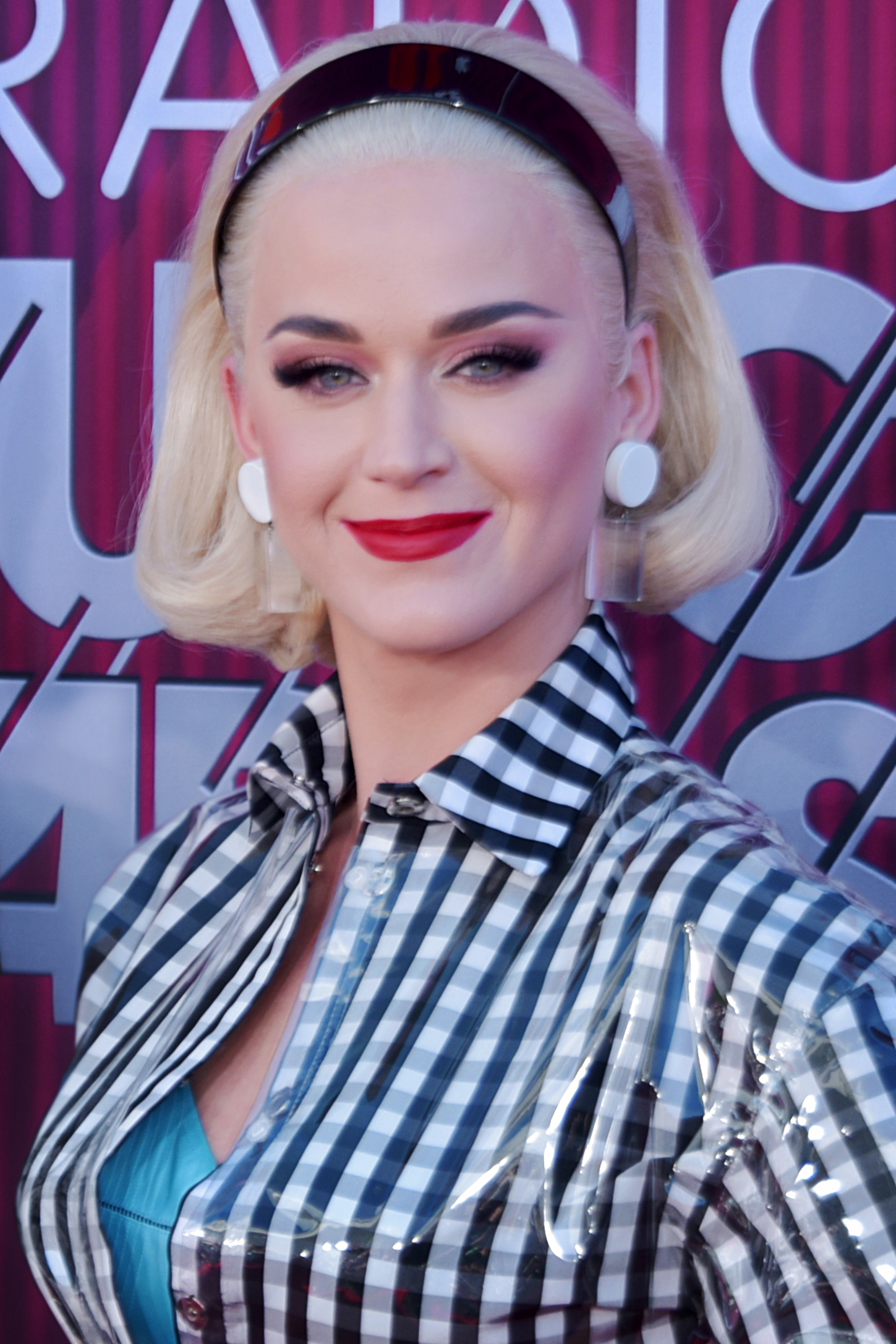
Fellow singer Katy Perry and her 2008 song "I Kissed a Girl" were referenced in the lyrics for "Whatcha Think About That".

A R&B and electropop midtempo song, "Whatcha Think About That" sees the group "laying down the law to a deadbeat boyfriend" over a melody of chants, and vocal harmonies and bhangra-ish guitar. A reviewer for Newsday noted that they sounded "sleek and empowered" on the song. "Whatcha Think About That" features guest verses from Missy Elliott and a sample of "Je M'appelle Jane", written by Mickael Furnon and performed by Jane Birkin. Noah from Idolator wrote that the song is reminiscent of Whitney Houston's single "I'm Your Baby Tonight" (1990). Elliott references Katy Perry and her 2008 song "I Kissed a Girl" during one of the verses with the lyric, "Up in that club it's just me and my girls, play like Katy Perry kissing on girls."

Meanwhile, "Painted Windows" reunited the Pussycat Dolls with Rodney Jerkins who produced "When I Grow Up" and "Elevator" for Doll Domination, with the song being described by Digital Spy's Nick Levine as "stomping and scuzzy in equal measure". A reviewer for Rap-Up teased that Melody Thornton could actually be heard singing on "Painted Windows", a nod to the fact that Scherzinger is credited for lead vocals and Thornton for additional lead vocals in liner notes for The Mini Collection.

Slant Magazine referred to "I Hate This Part" as an international hit, commenting that the "songwriting is strong enough to forgive whatever similarities the song has to Kylie Minogue's 'All I See' (2008) and Jordin Sparks's "One Step at a Time" (2008)". Yahoo! News referred to the song as an "understated ballad". "I Hate This Part" was written by Wayne Hector, Lucas, Jonas Jeberg and Mich Hansen, while produced by the latter of the two along with Fair and Scherzinger, with Fair also serving as the song's vocal producer. The song was recorded at the Cutfather Studios in Copenhagen, Denmark and at The Boiler Room in Santa Monica, California by Mike "Angry" Eleopoulos, Tal Herzber and Jeberg with the assistance of Johnathan Merritt. It was later mixed by Peter Mokran and Eric Weaver at Conway Studios in Hollywood, California. All instrumentation and programming was carried out by Jeberg. While recording the song, Scherzinger said that she was inspired by English rock singer Sting and American rock singer Steve Perry. "I Hate This Part" is a pop ballad, with influences of R&B and dance music. Instrumentation consists of a mournful piano, faux strings and syncopated rhythms. Like "When I Grow Up", "I Hate This Part" was also originally intended for Scherzinger's solo debut studio album Her Name Is Nicole, which was shelved.

The Mini Collection closes with "Hush Hush; Hush Hush", a house music remix of the song "Hush Hush". The new remix incorporates elements of Gloria Gaynor's 1978 disco song "I Will Survive". It was debuted and performed during the group's Doll Domination Tour, during the section where each member performed solo. Freddie Perren and Dino Fekaris received co-writing credits for the song, due to the interpolation of "I Will Survive", which includes quotation of the original string arrangement by David Blumberg. "Hush Hush; Hush Hush" was produced by Fair, Dave Audé and Quiz & Larossi, while Scherzinger handled vocal production and arrangement with Fair.

== Singles ==
"Jai Ho! (You Are My Destiny)" premiered on DesiHits and was issued for digital download as the lead single from The Mini Collection on February 23, 2009, a day after Rahman won Best Original Song for "Jai Ho" and Best Original Score for the soundtrack of Slumdog Millionaire at the 81st Academy Awards. An accompanying music video was released on March 13 of that year, which was directed by Thomas Kloss and filmed at the Wiener Linien tram museum in Vienna, Austria. In the clip, the group recreate the last scene from Slumdog Millionaire. Upon its release, the song topped several charts around the world, including in Australia, Finland, Ireland, Israel, and Romania, as well as reaching number 15 on the Billboard Hot 100, in the group's native country of the US. In the United Kingdom, "Jai Ho! (You Are My Destiny)" peaked at number three on the UK Singles Charts and as of 2017, it has sold 605,000 copies in the country as well as amassing 5.3 million streams to become the Pussycat Doll's second biggest selling single in the UK, behind their debut single "Don't Cha" (2005). The single was included as part of the group's set list for their support slot on Spears' The Circus Starring Britney Spears tour and as one of the encore songs on the set list of the group's own Doll Domination Tour.

The EP's second single was "Hush Hush; Hush Hush", a remix of the group's Doll Domination song, "Hush Hush". The single was scheduled to be released on April 28, 2009, with the pre-order's cover art having Scherzinger's name credited as a featured artist; this led to dissatisfaction with other members and media reports speculated that Scherzinger's exit from the group was imminent. The song's music video premiered on May 22, 2009, and was directed by Rich Lee. Despite the controversy, "Hush Hush; Hush Hush" peaked in the top 10 of several national record charts, including number four in Belgium (Wallonia) and Slovakia, number five in Finland and France, number six in Belgium (Flanders), and number ten in Australia.

== Reception and impact ==
=== Critical reception ===
Nick Levine from Digital Spy said of The Mini Collection that "at first glance, this release seems more than a little strange," suggesting "after scoring their biggest hit of the Doll Domination era with 'Jai Ho! (You Are My Destiny)', [...] the next move seemed obvious. Tack the Slumdog-sampling smash onto the end of the original album, add a couple more new tunes and call it a 'Deluxe Edition'." However, Levine noted that due to changes in music consumption, fans could now purchase albums track by track, so The Mini Collection made sense. Rounding up his review, Levine praised the label's decision to assemble the EP "without the padding that bogged down the original." He awarded The Mini Collection four out of five stars.

=== Legacy ===
The EP's lead single "Jai Ho! (You Are My Destiny)" listed Scherzinger as a featured artist, while follow up single "Hush Hush; Hush Hush" initially listed Scherzinger on the song. While opening for The Circus Starring Britney Spears (2009) in Glendale, Arizona, Melody Thornton addressed the crowd during the break, saying, "[...] [l]et me give a shout-out to my family. Thank you for supporting me, even if I'm not featured," referring to the billing of the singles, and encouraging the audience to follow their dreams and to "never let anyone stomp on them, ever". Scherzinger later spoke about her billing as a featured artist during a radio interview: "It's no big deal, that doesn't take away from anybody else in the group. That's my role. I wrote 'Hush Hush' as well." Following the controversy, Hush Hush; Hush Hush was ultimately released as a digital download on May 12, 2009, without Scherzinger's billing as a featured artist.

In September 2009, following the conclusion of the Doll Domination Tour, the Pussycat Dolls would begin a hiatus, with confirmation from group founder Robin Antin confirming that new members would be joining Scherzinger after the hiatus. By the end of 2010, each of the members of the group had departed, with Scherzinger being the last to leave. The News of the World reported that Scherzinger would be pursuing a solo career. The Mini Collection and "Hush Hush; Hush Hush" became the group's last releases, until in 2019 when they announced their reunion. Not all members were taking part in the reunion; Carmit Bachar, who had departed before the release of Doll Domination, would be joining fellow members Ashley Roberts, Scherzinger, Jessica Sutta and Kimberly Wyatt for the reunion but Thornton would not be joining. In 2020, the Pussycat Dolls released a new single "React".

== Commercial performance ==
In the United Kingdom, The Mini Collection debuted at number nine on the UK Albums Chart, with first-week sales of 13,676 according to Music Week; in the same article, it was noted that the full album Doll Domination had dropped out of the UK charts six weeks prior to the release of The Mini Collection, having sold 205,881 copies at the time of writing. This was less than a sixth of the amount the group's debut studio album PCD (2006) had sold in the UK: 1,246,769 copies at the time of writing. As of June 2009, The Mini Collection had sold over 70,000 copies in the United Kingdom. In March 2020, the EP was certified gold by the British Phonographic Industry (BPI), denoting 100,000 sales in the United Kingdom.

== Track listing ==
Doll Domination – The Mini Collection
No.	Title	Writer(s)	Producer(s)	Length
1.	"Jai Ho! (You Are My Destiny)" (with A. R. Rahman featuring Nicole Scherzinger)	Nicole Scherzinger; Ester Dean; Ron Fair; Evan Bogart; Erika Nuri; David Quiñones; Nailah Thorbourne; Nyanda Thorbourne; Candace Thorbourne	A. R. Rahman; Fair^{[b]}; Scherzinger^{[a]}	3:42
2.	"When I Grow Up"	Rodney "Darkchild" Jerkins; Theron Thomas; Timothy Thomas; Jim McCarty; Paul Samwell-Smith	Jerkins	4:05
3.	"Whatcha Think About That" (featuring Missy Elliott)	Jamal Jones; Dean; Missy Elliott; Mickael Furnon	Polow da Don; Fair^{[a]}; Dean^{[a]}	3:48
4.	"Painted Windows"	Jerkins; Osinachi Nwaneri; Kalenna Harper; Crystal Johnson	Jerkins; Nwaneri	3:35
5.	"I Hate This Part"	Wayne Hector; Lucas; Jonas Jeberg; Mich Hansen	Jeberg; Cutfather; Fair; Scherzinger^{[a]}	3:39
6.	"Hush Hush; Hush Hush"	Andreas Romdhane; Josef Larossi; Ina Wroldsen; Scherzinger; Freddie Perren; Dino Fekaris	Fair; Dave Audé; Quiz & Larossi; Scherzinger^{[a]}	4:13
Total length:				23:03

Notes

- ^{^a} signifies a vocal producer
- ^{^b} signifies an additional producer.

Samples

- "When I Grow Up" samples He's Always There", as written by Jim McCarty and Paul Samwell-Smith, and performed by The Yardbirds.
- "Whatcha Think About That" samples Je M'appelle Jane", as written by Mickael Furnon and performed by Jane Birkin.
- "Hush Hush; Hush Hush" samples "I Will Survive", as written by Freddie Perren and Dino Fekaris, and an interpolation of the original string arrangement by David Blumberg, as performed by Gloria Gaynor.

== Credits and personnel ==
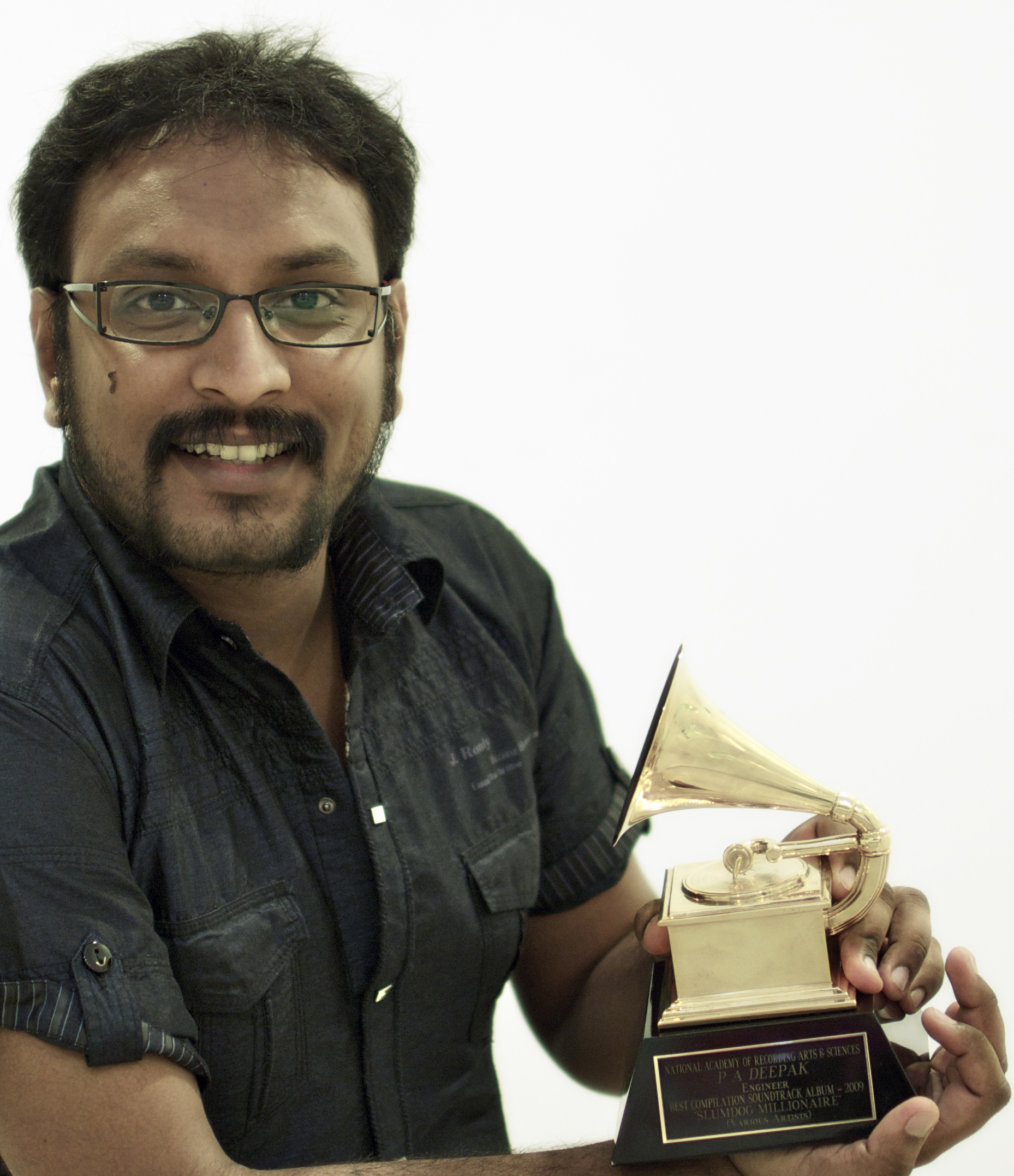
Deepak P.A. won a Grammy for his work on the original "Jai Ho!".

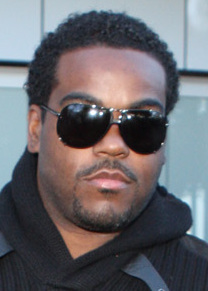
Rodney Jerkins reunited with the group on "Painted Windows", after producing "When I Grow Up".

Adapted from Doll Domination album liner notes for individual songs and Doll Domination – The Mini Collection album sleeve for overall, business and arts credits.

=== Recording studios ===
- 2nd Floor Studios – Orlando, Florida (track 2)
- Conway Recording – Hollywood California (tracks 1, 5)
- Chalice Recording – Los Angeles, California (track 2)
- Cutfather Studios – Copenhagen, Denmark (track 5)
- Henson Recording Studios in – Los Angeles, California (track 5)
- Quiz & Larossi Studios – Stockholm, Sweden (track 5)
- The Boiler Room – Santa Monica, California (tracks 3, 5, 6)
- Zac Studio – Atlanta, Georgia (track 3)

=== Vocals ===
- Ashley Roberts – additional background vocals
- Nicole Scherzinger – all lead and background vocals
- Jessica Sutta – additional background vocals
- Melody Thornton – additional lead and background vocals
- Kimberly Wyatt – additional background vocals

=== Musicians and technicians ===
- Dave Audé – production, programming (track 6)
- Ester Dean – songwriter, vocal production (track 3)
- Deepak P.A. – engineering (track 1)
- Aubry "Big Juice" Delaine – recording (track 3)
- Greg DePante – assistant engineer (track 6)
- Mike "Handz" Donaldson – recording (track 2)
- Bruce Dukov – concertmaster (track 6)
- Mike "Angry" Eleopoulos – recording (tracks 3, 5, 6)
- Missy Elliott – songwriter, background vocals (track 3)
- Eric Eyland – assistant engineer (track 6)
- Ron Fair – additional production (track 1), vocal production (tracks 1, 3, 5, 6), string arrangement and conductor (track 3, 6), producer (track 5, 6), vocal arranger (track 6), keyboards (track 6)
- Eric Florence – tuba (track 3)
- Paul Foley – recording (track 2)
- Mickaël Furnon – songwriter (track 3)
- Brian Gardner – mastering (track 1)
- Steve Genewick – assistant engineer (track 6)
- Keith Gretlein – assistant engineer (track 6)
- Bernie Grundman – mastering (track 1)
- Mich "Cutfather" Hansen – songwriter, producer (track 5)
- Kalenna Harper – songwriter (track 4)
- Wayne Hector – songwriter (track 5)
- Tal Herzberg – engineering (track 1), Pro Tools (tracks 1, 3, 5, 6), recording (tracks 3, 5, 6)
- Jonas Jeberg – songwriter, producer, recording, instruments, programming (track 5)
- Rodney "Darkchild" Jerkins – songwriter (tracks 2, 4), producer (tracks 2, 4), additional vocals (track 2), audio mixing (track 2)
- Crystal Johnson – songwriter (track 4)
- Jaycen Joshua – mixing (track 3)
- Josef Larossi – songwriter, producer, recording (track 6)
- Gayle Levant – harp (track 6)
- Jim McCarty – songwriter (track 2)
- Johnathan Merritt – assistant recording (tracks 3, 5, 6)
- Peter Mokran – mixing (tracks 1, 5, 6)
- Bryan Morton – assistant recording (track 3)
- Dave Pensado – mixing (track 3)
- Jason Perry – keyboards (track 3)
- Jamal Jones – songwriter, producer (track 3)
- A. R. Rahman – primary artist, musical production, composer (track 1)
- Rock City (Theron and Timothy Thomas) – songwriter, additional vocals (track 2)
- Andreas Romdhane – songwriter, producer instruments, programming, recording (track 6)
- Lissy Rosemond – banjo (track 3)
- Paul Samwell-Smith – songwriter (track 2)
- Nicole Scherzinger – featured artist, vocal production (tracks 1, 5)
- Lucas Secon – songwriter (track 5)
- Ryan Shanahan – assistant engineer (track 6)
- H. Sridhar – engineering (track 1)
- Spike Stent – audio mixing (track 2)
- Tony Terrebonne – recording (track 3)
- Roberto "Tito" Vazquez – recording (track 2)
- Tommy Vicari – strings recording (track 6)
- Eric Weaver – mixing assistant (tracks 5, 6)
- Matt Wheeler – recording (track 3)
- Frank Wolf – strings recording (track 6)
- Ina Wroldsen – songwriter (track 6)
- Andrew Wuepper – mixing (tracks 3, 6)

=== Art ===
- Matthew Rolston – photography
- Julian Peploe Studio – art direction

== Charts and certifications ==
=== Charts ===
Chart listing for The Mini Collection
Chart (2009)	Peak position
Canadian Albums (Nielsen SoundScan)	58
Scottish Albums (Official Charts)	9
UK Albums (Official Charts)	9

=== Certifications ===
Region	Certification	Certified units/sales
United Kingdom (BPI)	Gold	100,000^{‡}
^{‡} Sales+streaming figures based on certification alone.

== Release history ==
Release dates and formats for The Mini Collection
Country	Date	Format	Label	Ref.
Ireland	April 24, 2009	Digital download	Universal Music	
Spain	April 27, 2009	Digital download	Universal Music	
United Kingdom	April 27, 2009	Digital download	Polydor	
United Kingdom	May 15, 2009	CD	Polydor	
Canada	July 7, 2009	CD	Universal Music	
Canada	July 28, 2009	Digital download	Universal Music	
