= Love the Way You Love Me =

Love the Way You Love Me may refer to:

- "Love the Way You Love Me" (Bill Brewster song), from the 2013 album Late Night Tales Presents After Dark
- "Love the Way You Love Me" (Change song), from the 1985 album Turn on Your Radio
- "Love the Way You Love Me" (Eddie Money song), from the 1978 album Life for the Taking
- "Love the Way You Love Me" (Sheléa song), 2013 single
- "Love the Way You Love Me" (Tatyana Ali song), from the 1998 album Boy You Knock Me Out
- "Love the Way You Love Me" (The Pussycat Dolls song), from the 2008 album Doll Domination
