= Out of This Club =

Single by the Pussycat Dolls featuring R. Kelly and Polow da Don

from the album Doll Domination
- Released: October 12, 2008
- Studio: The Chocolate Factory (Chicago, Illinois)
- Genre: R&B
- Length: 4:08
- Label: Interscope
- Songwriters: Robert Kelly; Jamal Jones
- Producer: R. Kelly

The Pussycat Dolls singles chronology
"I Hate This Part" (2008)	"Out of This Club" (2008)	"Bottle Pop" (2009)

R. Kelly singles chronology
"All the Above" (2007)	"Out of This Club" (2008)	"I Believe" (2008)

Nicole Scherzinger singles chronology
"Right There" (2011)	"Out This Club (remix)" (2011)	"Wet" (2011)

"Out of This Club" is a song by American girl group the Pussycat Dolls from their second studio album, Doll Domination (2008). The song features guest appearances from singer R. Kelly and record producer Polow da Don, who both wrote the song. In the United States, it was serviced to urban contemporary radio stations on October 10, 2008, months after Kelly's acquittal of possessing child pornography in 2002. In the R&B song, lead singer Nicole Scherzinger teases Kelly to get her to settle down with piano melodies and a soft beat. The song received mixed reviews from music critics, who were split towards Kelly's artistry. The song debuted and peaked at number 24 on the US Billboard Bubbling Under R&B/Hip-Hop Singles chart. In 2011, Rudie Classics released a remix of the song titled "Out This Club", featuring Kelly, Polow da Don and Scherzinger. In 2019, "Out of This Club" was removed from digital and streaming platforms, following new allegations of sexual misconduct and assault towards Kelly, however the Rudie Classics version remained available.

== Production and release ==
"Out of This Club" was written by its featured artists R. Kelly and Jamal "Polow da Don" Jones, with the former also producing and arranging it. The song marks the third time The Pussycat Dolls collaborated with the record producer, who previously produced "Buttons" from PCD (2005) and "Whatcha Think About That" of Doll Domination (2008). The vocals were recorded by Ian Mereness, Abel Garibaldi, Jeff Meeks, and Eric Schlotzer at The Chocolate Factory in Chicago, Illinois. It was mixed by Dave Pensado and Jaycen Joshua, with Kelly providing additional assistance. It was programmed by Mereness, Meeks, and Schlotzer. Guitars were played by Donnie Lyle and Patrick Hayes. Kelly appeared courtesy of Jive Records. In August 2008, Rap-Up first reported that "Out of This Club" would be included in the group's second studio album Doll Domination (2008). The song impacted US urban contemporary airplay stations on October 12, 2008, following the release of the album's second single "Whatcha Think About That". Its followed Kelly's acquittal of possessing child pornography in 2002 by a couple of months. On July 12, 2011, a remix titled "Out This Club" (remix) by Rudie Classics featuring R. Kelly, Polow da Don and Nicole Scherzinger was released for digital download.

== Composition and reception ==
"Out of this Club"
A 24-second sample of the "romantic chorus", where Scherzinger "coos and flirts" with Kelly.

Musically, "Out of This Club" is a R&B song that runs for a total of four minutes and eight seconds. Described as a "mid-tempo jam", production is set to 34 beats per minute, and contains "rudimentary piano melodies" and a "plush beat", which results in the song sounding saccharine, lively, and sassy. The vocals are "layered on top of one another in a cascading fashion", with the artists using slang terms such as "conversate". Lyrically, Nicole Scherzinger pleads Kelly "to settle down after a wild life" and prefers to have sex outside the club. According to Joey Guerra from the Houston Chronicle, Scherzinger is tired of the "seedy stripper life", while Kelly is a sugar daddy who is fed-up of the party lifestyle, which is exemplified by the lyrics, "I drank enough / I danced enough / I partied enough / I sweated enough". Critics have noted that "Out of This Club" is a possible sequel to Usher's "Love In This Club" (2008). Polow da Don's rap line, "If you ain't got no money, take your broke ass home" is sampled from Fergie's "Glamorous" (2007), which he had previously produced.

Guerra called "Out of This Club" "oddly appealing". Nic Oliver of musicOMH complimented Kelly as a writer and producer, commenting he is doing a "fine job on the slow jam". Christian Hoard of Rolling Stone was also complimentary of the production, describing it as "catchy" and he noted down the collaborators as "worth the money". IGN's Spence D. lacked expectations for Kelly, characterizing the song as a "standard sex you up fare". However, he did compliment the vocal stylings for "[sounding] cool". On the contrary, Sal Cinquemani of Slant Magazine derided Kelly's songwriting as "bottom-notch". Rashod Ollison of The Baltimore Sun labelled Kelly's appearance as "phoned-in", adding he "[does] nothing to elevate the calculated [track]". Jaime Gill of Yahoo! Music lambasted "Out Of This Club", pinpointing it as the nadir of Doll Domination. He continued: "This could have been a spiky female riposte to the 'let's have sex in this nitespot toilet' genre pioneered by Nelly, Usher and [Kelly], but Scherzinger is no Madonna nor Pink, and rather than making Kelly spill his Cristal with nerves, she simpers and drools like Jessica Simpson on Rohypnol." Commercially, "Out Of This Club" entered and peaked at number 24 on the US Billboard Bubbling Under R&B/Hip-Hop Singles, a component chart which represented the 25 songs that failed to make an impact on the US Hot R&B/Hip-Hop Songs chart.

== Track listing ==
Album track

1. "Out of This Club" - featuring R. Kelly and Polow da Don - 4:08

2011 Remix

1. "Out This Club" - featuring R. Kelly and Polow da Don - 3:39

== Removal from album and sale ==
In January 2019, the television documentary Surviving R. Kelly exposed new allegations of sexual misconduct and assault. In response, the Pussycat Dolls asked their former label, Interscope Records to remove the song from all streaming platforms, meaning neither artist could profit from the song. Beginning April 2019, the song was also excluded from subsequent CD pressings of Doll Domination. During an interview with Heat magazine, member Kimberly Wyatt explained that the collaboration was out of the group's hands: "When it came to the music, and when it came to R. Kelly, that was completely out of my hands. I had nothing to do with the song or the choice. I never met the man, I was never in the studio with him. If I had had more power I probably would have made it a bit different." The Rudie Classic version of the song credited as featuring R. Kelly, Polow da Don and Nicole Scherzinger remains available on Apple Music.

== Chart ==
Chart performance for "Out of This Club"
Chart (2008)	Peak position
US Bubbling Under R&B/Hip-Hop Singles (Billboard)	24
