= Doll Domination Tour =

2009 concert tour by the Pussycat Dolls

- World tour by The Pussycat Dolls
- Promotional poster for the tour
- Location: Asia; Europe; North America; Oceania
- Associated album: Doll Domination
- Start date: January 18, 2009
- End date: July 31, 2009
- Legs: 3
- No. of shows: 51
- Supporting acts: Lady Gaga; Ne-Yo; Queensberry; Victoria; Marian Cekovsky; Laci Strike; Havana Brown; After School; Son Dam-bi; Q-York
- Attendance: 231,711 (19 shows)
- Box office: US$14.3 million (Note: US$21.46 million in 2025 dollars.)

The Pussycat Dolls concert chronology
- PCD World Tour (2006–07); Doll Domination Tour (2009); PCD Forever Tour (2026)

The Doll Domination Tour (billed as Doll Domination World Tour 2009) was the second concert tour by American girl group the Pussycat Dolls. It was launched in support of their second studio album, Doll Domination (2008). The tour was announced in October 2008 with dates in Europe and Oceania revealed in the following month, the tour contained six legs and 50 shows. It began in Aberdeen, Scotland on January 18, 2009, and concluded in Beirut, Lebanon on July 31, 2009. In-between the first two legs, the group supported the first leg of the Circus Starring Britney Spears tour in North America. The setlist for the concerts included songs from PCD (2005) and Doll Domination as well as a cover of Shirley Bassey's "Big Spender". Nineteen shows were submitted to Billboard's boxscore grossing $14.3 million, with 231,711 fans attending the performances.

== Background ==
In August 2008, in an interview with FemaleFirst.co.uk, Ashley Roberts said that their world tour would start January 2009 adding "we're gonna be hitting everywhere around the world and taking over." The tour was officially announced on October 7, 2008. Initial dates were confirmed in the UK with Ne-Yo tapped as a support act. The following month, Lady Gaga was announced as an opening act in Europe and in Oceania which marked their first time touring there, while the US shows were to be announced shortly. On December 2, 2008, Britney Spears announced the first leg of twenty-five dates in the US for The Circus Starring Britney Spears with the Pussycat Dolls as the opening act. The tour kicked off on January 18 in Aberdeen, Scotland with the first leg ending in Belgrade, Serbia. Before heading to the Oceania shows, the Pussycat Dolls supported Spears on her tour visiting 27 venues in North America. Following Oceania, they visited Asia and North America and in July they visited England and Ireland for various festivals. Eight weeks before the tour started Jimmy Iovine stated that the group had sold 150,000 out of 160,000.

== Development ==
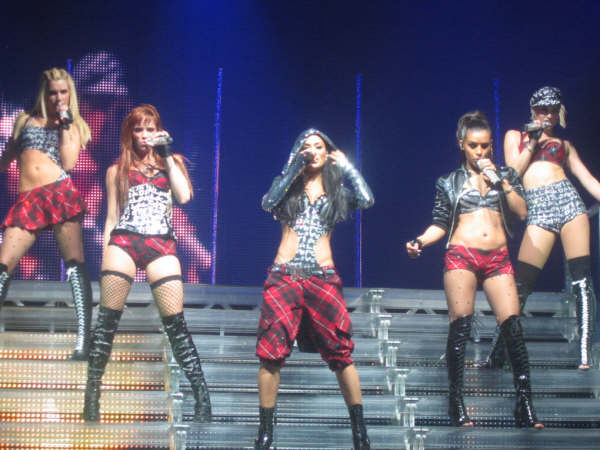
The Pussycat Dolls performing on the tour

The stage screens for the tour were created by Stimulated, Inc. The videos included original design and animation looks for 25 songs. The company spent two months at its Burbank studio creating the visual content for the tour. The opening video sequence of the tour was filmed at a sound stage in Hollywood, California. The group were riding motorcycles against a green screen backdrop. Then, along with the Pussycat Dolls they traveled to Leeds, United Kingdom. Along with Robb Wagner and his team, the Dolls and their creative team, worked hand-in-hand polishing the media content. The Pussycat Dolls spent six days in the Litestructures Studios for a full production rehearsal. The stage was designed by Litestructures. It marked the fourth time that the company worked with the Pussycat Dolls. It measured 32 ft(w) x 24 ft(deep) and 8 ft(tall) – made to fit on 60 ft x 44 ft house stage. It featured includes three custom-built staircases which were made of small aluminium frame with a makrolon top.

The set list of the shows included songs from the standard and deluxe edition of Doll Domination (2008) as well songs from their debut studio album, PCD (2005). Big Spender by Shirley Bassey was covered by Melody Thornton, as well cover versions of other artists which were used as snippets to songs. During the performances, the group was backed by five male dancers and two percussionists. During the opening leg of the tour, each show was recorded live and then loaded to the Pussycat Dolls wristband that plugs into any USB port or compatible microSD phone. According to Metro the Pussycat Dolls were reportedly planning to make a behind-the-scenes movie about life on their tour. According to an insider, the band had started filming for the movie which was described "as part documentary and part entertainment." Despite this, the documentary never came to fruition. Jessica Sutta suffered a back injury during the first Sydney show, leaving the group performing as a four-piece throughout the following shows.

== Critical response ==
While reviewing the opening concert in Aberdeen, Colene McKessick of The Press and Journal described it as a "roof-raising show." The writer praised the show for its "risque dance moves and infectious energy." She also commended Nicole Scherzinger's ability to carry most of the vocals and was impressed by her bandmates describing them as "talented singers too." Sally Hind of the Evening Express lauded the opening night writing "they came to dominate and that’s what they did." She went on to praise the group's energy, "the five foxy felines didn’t once pause for breath. They were on the move from the minute they appeared on stage on shiny motorbikes until they took their final bow." She also praised the costumes of the show that "kept everyone fixated." Writing for the Evening Times Maureen Ellis described the show as a "high-octane set" whilst noting that even though they "tried to showcase each of the band members in solo sections, it was only ever The Nicole Show." Barbara Hodgson of The Journal described the show as "a solid three hours-plus of pure entertainment."

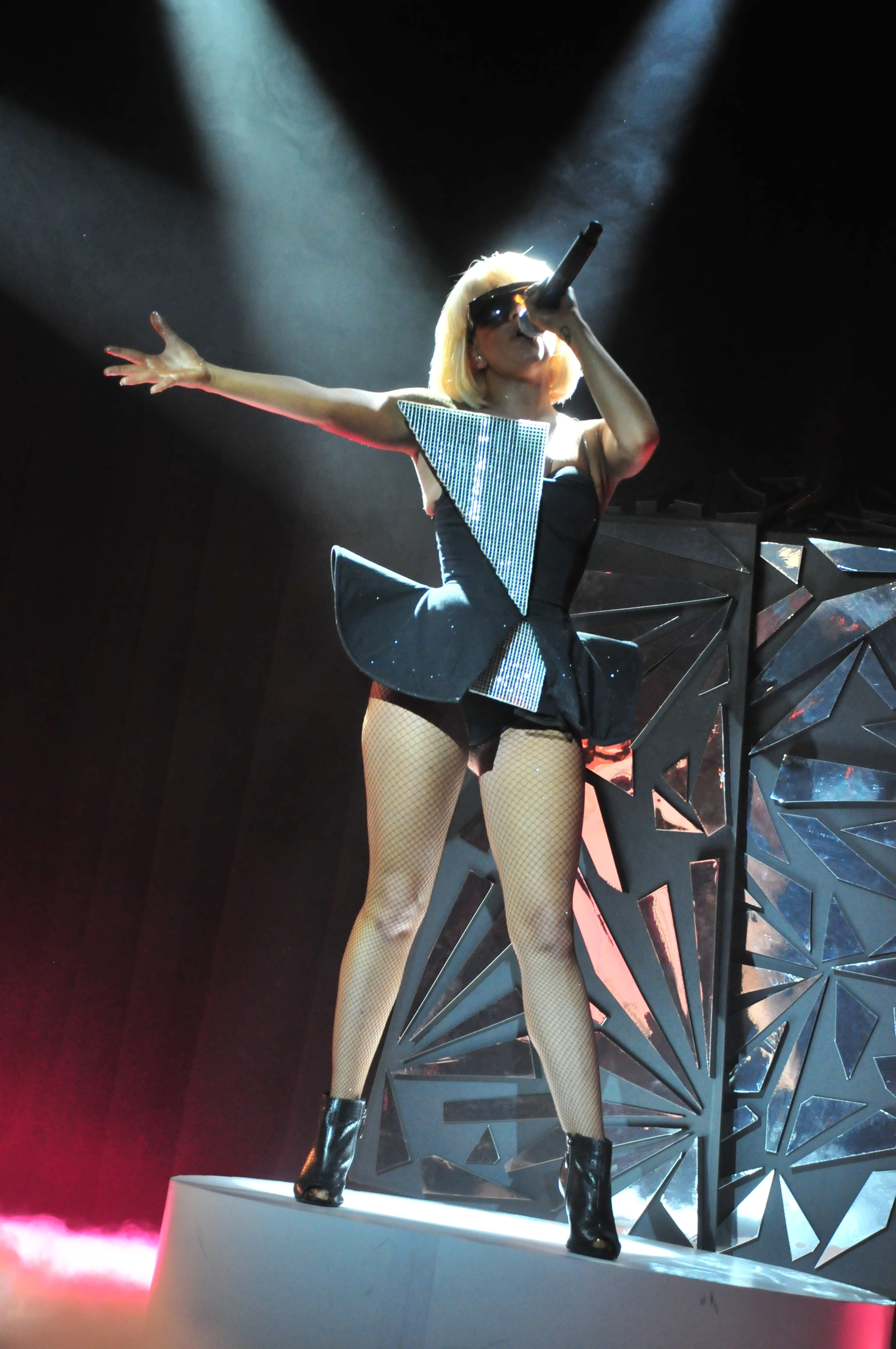
Several journalists compared the Pussycat Dolls' show unfavorably to the performance of opening act Lady Gaga (pictured in 2009).

A writer for the Evening Chronicle thought that both Lady Gaga and Ne-Yo raised the standard too high, but went on to praise the group who "somersaulted over it." Lauren Richards of the Birmingham Mail graded it four out five describing it "spectacular, fast paced and great fun." Zoe Kirk of the Nottingham Post commented "this is more than just an ordinary, flimsy girl band; this is the manifestation of some of the best choreographers, beat-makers and catchy pop lyricists the mainstream has to offer." She ended her review writing "This was the Doll Domination their latest album promises." Andy Nicholls of the Bournemouth Echo wrote that "[Scherzinger] may have taken center stage for most of the songs, Ashley, Jessica, Melody and Kimberly all proved they too had star quality." On the contrary to Nicholls, Alex Macpherson from The Guardian felt that the remaining four members "are mere backing singers and dancers" and described Scherzinger as a "revelation, a switched-on, precision-engineered performer." He singled out "I Hate This Part" as the "Dolls' finest moment." Eamon Sweeney of the Irish Independent commented that "despite a dramatic entrance on customized motorbikes, the early segment of the show seems like a massive anti-climax," but later noted that the group "soon get in their stride." He further noted that previous shows at The O_{2} in Dublin were musically superior, "but few can match this for sheer attitude." A writer for the Belfast Telegraph described the show as "excellent".

For the opening night of the Oceanian leg of the tour in Auckland, New Zealand, Joanna Hunkin of the New Zealand Herald felt that Lady Gaga "group out-sang, outshone and out-sexed the Dolls, in half the time and half the space." Hunkin, who described the group as "poster girls"," criticized the "disappointingly budget set" and the lack of live musicians calling the show as "a glorified karaoke night [...] at the strip club." She concluded her negative review writing the "show proved the Dolls aren't dominating anything." Reviewing the same show, Clio Francis from the Stuff.co.nz agreed with Hunkin praising Gaga for "outshin[ing] the tawdry sexuality of the headliners." He also criticized the basic production while noting the "sound quality throughout their set was mediocre at best, with the over heavy bass at times smothering any passable melodies." However he noted that the night's encore "[brought] the night to a satisfying conclusion for most young fans." Marissa Calligeros from The Sydney Morning Herald echoed previous comments, commending Gaga for "outshin[ing] and outclass[ing] the factory-made act of the headliners." She went to describe the Pussycat Dolls as "a teen dance troupe leading an amateur high school musical production," noting throughout show the audience largely stood motionless, due to the heavy bass. However she did praise Scherzinger's vocals calling them "impressive". Cameron Adams of the Herald Sun praised Gaga's vocal and piano skills whilst criticizing the group for an over-priced concert that looked more as "a shopping center performance than a headline arena show."

In July 2009, Billboard magazine released their Mid-Year List Of Top 25 Tours where data was collected between December 6, 2008 through June 20, 2009, the Pussycat Dolls were listed at number 25 with gross of $14.3 million and 231,711 fans attended the reported 23 shows of which, the twelve were sold-out.

== Setlist ==
The following setlist was obtained from the concert held on February 24, 2009, at the Incheba Expo Arena in Bratislava, Slovakia. It does not represent all concerts for the duration of the tour.

1. "Takin' Over the World"
2. "Beep"
3. "I Don't Need a Man"
4. "Elevator"
5. "I Hate This Part"
6. "Buttons"
7. "Wait a Minute"
8. "Love the Way You Love Me”
9. "Space" (Thornton solo)
10. "Played" (Roberts solo)
11. "Don't Wanna Fall in Love" (Wyatt solo)
12. "If I Was a Man" (Sutta solo)
13. "Hush Hush"
14. "Big Spender" (Thornton solo)
15. "Whatcha Think About That"
16. "Whatchamacallit"
17. "Magic"
18. "Bottle Pop"
19. "Halo" (Scherzinger solo)
20. "Stickwitu"

Encore

21. "Don't Cha"
22. "When I Grow Up"

Notes

- Starting with the Auckland show, "Jai Ho! (You Are My Destiny)" was permanently added to the set list, performing it as an encore, before "When I Grow Up".
- Opening act Lady Gaga performed songs from her debut album, The Fame (2008), including "Just Dance", "Paparazzi", and "Poker Face".

== Shows ==
List of concerts, showing date, city, country, venue, opening act, tickets sold, number of available tickets and amount of gross revenue
Date	City	Country	Venue	Opening acts	Attendance	Revenue
Europe
January 18, 2009	Aberdeen	Scotland	Press & Journal Arena	Lady Gaga	—N/a	—N/a
January 19, 2009	Glasgow	Scotland	SECC Concert Hall 4	Lady Gaga; Ne-Yo	—N/a	—N/a
January 21, 2009	Newcastle	England	Metro Radio Arena	Lady Gaga; Ne-Yo	9,500 / 9,500	$436,100
January 22, 2009	Birmingham	England	National Indoor Arena	Lady Gaga; Ne-Yo	11,494 / 11,494	$517,217
January 24, 2009	Nottingham	England	Trent FM Arena	Lady Gaga; Ne-Yo	7,955 / 7,955	$355,081
January 25, 2009	Bournemouth	England	Windsor Hall	Lady Gaga	—N/a	—N/a
January 27, 2009	London	England	The O_{2} Arena	Lady Gaga; Ne-Yo	28,305 / 28,305	$1,285,759
January 28, 2009	London	England	The O_{2} Arena	Lady Gaga; Ne-Yo	28,305 / 28,305	$1,285,759
January 29, 2009	Manchester	England	Manchester Evening News Arena	Lady Gaga; Ne-Yo	14,766 / 14,766	$684,047
January 30, 2009	Cardiff	Wales	Cardiff International Arena	Lady Gaga; Ne-Yo	7,434 / 7,434	$343,835
February 1, 2009	Dublin	Ireland	The O_{2}	Lady Gaga	12,417 / 12,417	$751,286
February 3, 2009	Belfast	Ireland	King's Hall	Lady Gaga	7,331 / 7,331	$377,315
February 5, 2009	Sheffield	England	Sheffield Arena	Lady Gaga	10,041 / 10,041	$434,768
February 6, 2009	Liverpool	England	Echo Arena	Lady Gaga	9,543 / 9,543	$415,705
February 8, 2009	Paris	France	Zénith de Paris	Lady Gaga	—N/a	—N/a
February 9, 2009	Amsterdam	Netherlands	Heineken Music Hall	Lady Gaga; Queensberry	—N/a	—N/a
February 10, 2009	Frankfurt	Germany	Jahrhunderthalle	Lady Gaga; Queensberry	—N/a	—N/a
February 12, 2009	Zürich	Switzerland	Hallenstadion	Lady Gaga; Queensberry	—N/a	—N/a
February 13, 2009	Forest	Belgium	Forest National	Lady Gaga	8,000 / 8,000	$389,637
February 14, 2009	Munich	Germany	Zenith	Lady Gaga; Queensberry	—N/a	—N/a
February 15, 2009	Esch-sur-Alzette	Luxembourg	Rockhal	Lady Gaga; Queensberry	—N/a	—N/a
February 17, 2009	Monte Carlo	Monaco	Salle des Princes	Lady Gaga; Queensberry	—N/a	—N/a
February 18, 2009	Düsseldorf	Germany	Philips Halle	Queensberry	—N/a	—N/a
February 19, 2009	Berlin	Germany	Max-Schmeling-Halle	Queensberry	—N/a	—N/a
February 21, 2009	Prague	Czech Republic	Tesla Arena	Victoria	—N/a	—N/a
February 23, 2009	Vienna	Austria	Bank Austria Halle	Queensberry	—N/a	—N/a
February 24, 2009	Bratislava	Slovakia	Incheba Expo Arena	Marian Cekovsky; Laci Strike	—N/a	—N/a
February 25, 2009	Belgrade	Serbia	Belgrade Arena	Lady Gaga	—N/a	—N/a
Oceania
May 16, 2009	Auckland	New Zealand	Vector Arena	Lady Gaga	11,556 / 12,216	$713,927
May 19, 2009	Brisbane	Australia	Brisbane Entertainment Centre	Lady Gaga; Havana Brown	9,090 / 11,420	$765,095
May 21, 2009	Newcastle	Australia	Newcastle Entertainment Centre	Lady Gaga; Havana Brown	—N/a	—N/a
May 22, 2009	Sydney	Australia	Acer Arena	Lady Gaga; Havana Brown	22,468 / 23,270	$2,129,922
May 23, 2009	Sydney	Australia	Acer Arena	Lady Gaga; Havana Brown	22,468 / 23,270	$2,129,922
May 26, 2009	Melbourne	Australia	Rod Laver Arena	Lady Gaga; Havana Brown	23,323 / 26,548	$1,966,724
May 27, 2009	Melbourne	Australia	Rod Laver Arena	Lady Gaga; Havana Brown	23,323 / 26,548	$1,966,724
May 28, 2009	Adelaide	Australia	Adelaide Entertainment Centre	Lady Gaga; Havana Brown	7,903 / 9,888	$681,753
May 30, 2009	Perth	Australia	Burswood Dome	Lady Gaga; Havana Brown	12,852 / 16,881	$1,075,415
Asia
June 2, 2009	Jakarta	Indonesia	Istora Senayan	—N/a	—N/a	—N/a
June 3, 2009	Bangkok	Thailand	Indoor Stadium Huamark	—N/a	—N/a	—N/a
June 4, 2009	Singapore		Singapore Indoor Stadium	—N/a	—N/a	—N/a
June 6, 2009	Seoul	South Korea	Olympic Cycling Stadium	After School; Son Dam-bi	—N/a	—N/a
June 11, 2009	Manila	Philippines	Mall of Asia Concert Grounds	Q-York	—N/a	—N/a
North America
June 13, 2009	Honolulu	United States	Blaisdell Arena	—N/a	—N/a	—N/a
June 27, 2009	Las Vegas	United States	Pearl Concert Theater	—N/a	—N/a	—N/a
Europe
July 17, 2009 (Note: The July 17, 2009 concert in Suffolk was a part of the Newmarket Nights.)	Suffolk	England	Newmarket Racecourse	—N/a	—N/a	—N/a
July 18, 2009 (Note: The July 18, 2009 concert in Killarney was a part of the Killarney Summerfest.)	Killarney	Ireland	Fitzgerald Stadium	—N/a	—N/a	—N/a
July 22, 2009 (Note: The July 22, 2009 concert in Liverpool was a part of the Summer Pops Festival.)	Liverpool	England	Echo Arena	—N/a	—N/a	—N/a
July 24, 2009 (Note: The July 24, 2009 concert in Northampton was a part of the Silverstone Classic.)	Northampton	England	Silverstone Circuit	—N/a	—N/a	—N/a
July 25, 2009 (Note: The July 25, 2009 concert in Kent was a part of the Sound Island Music Festival.)	Kent	England	Quex Park	—N/a	—N/a	—N/a
July 29, 2009 (Note: The July 29, 2009 concert in Esher was a part of Music Nights.)	Esher	England	Sandown Park	—N/a	—N/a	—N/a
Asia
July 31, 2009	Beirut	Lebanon	Beirut International Exhibition & Leisure Center	—N/a	—N/a	—N/a
Total					213,978 / 227,009 (94%)	$13,323,690

== Personnel ==
Personnel taken from Doll Domination World Tour book.

The Pussycat Dolls

- Ashley Roberts
- Nicole Scherzinger
- Jessica Sutta
- Melody Thornton
- Kimberly Wyatt

Personnel

- Robin Antin – artist director, choreographer
- Dave Audé – music supervisor
- Ramon Baynes – contributing choreographer ("Whatchamacallit")
- Kenya Clay – associate choreographer
- Misha Gabriel – contributing choreographer ("Halo")
- Galen Hooks – contributing choreographer ("Magic")
- Mikey Minden – artist director, choreographer
- Kenny Wormald – contributing choreographer ("Halo", "Magic", "Played", and "Wait a Minute")
