= Victoria (Czech singer) =

Victoria Blyth
- Also known as: Victoria, Victoria Velvet, Victoria Vera Blyth
- Born: Vera Ficková; November 13, 1984; Cape Town, South Africa
- Died: June 11, 2024 (aged 39) Ankara, Turkey
- Genres: Rhythm and blues
- Instruments: Piano, vocals
- Years active: 2001–2024
- Spouse: David Thomas Blyth (2014–2024)

Victoria Vera Blyth (née Ficková; 13 November 1984 – 11 June 2024), known professionally as Victoria or Victoria Velvet, was a Czech–South African singer and businesswoman.

She was one of the most prominent singers of the R&B scene in the Czech Republic. She became widely known with the hit "Hotel California" from her debut album This Is Me! (2006). She also rose to fame thanks to singer Dara Rolins and also collaborated with singer Kristína. She released two studio albums.

Throughout her career she performed in South Korea, Japan, Switzerland, Brazil and Slovakia. She also performed several times as a dancer at the Rio de Janeiro carnival.

In June 2024, she was murdered by her husband in Turkey at the age of 39.

== Biography ==
Victoria was born on 13 November 1983 in Cape Town, South Africa. Her father was Czech and her mother was Namibian. She and her family returned to the Czech Republic in 1998 , when they moved to Prague. Despite being Czech, her native language was English as she was raised in South Africa speaking only English and Dutch. She only began to learn Czech after attending a Czech school.

From an early age she wanted to be a singer, but her father was opposed to it. Her mother introduced her to music, thanks to whom she began singing church gospels in a local choir in Cape Town. Victoria studied musicology, classical piano and graduated from the British Business Academy in 2005. She stayed committed to music after moving to the Czech Republic in 1998 and began to celebrate her first successes after which her father accepted her musical vocation. She first entered into the Czech music scene with the help of the producer Václav "Iceman" Žáček. In 2001, he approached her and they began performing together in Czech clubs at R&B parties. In June 2003, she travelled with Dara Rolins on a three-week tour.

In early 2004, she released the single "Křídla 04" (a cover of Roberta Flack's "Killing Me Softly" ), which was produced for her by Czech R&B DJ Iceman. As a prelude to her debut album, the single "Cry" was released a year later in April 2005, which became a radio hit. The second single "Hotel California" (a cover of the song by the Eagles) made Victoria one of the most played performers on Czech radio.

In late 2005, she released her debut studio album This Is Me!. Among the featured artists on the album were Slovak rapper Helicó and MC NI from the hip hop group Cherry Hill.

In the summer of 2008, the single "Boneshakin' Hot" was released, announcing the upcoming second album. The video for the song was directed by Slovak director Braňo Vincze. The choreography was created by the choreographer Nick Jackson. The singer herself significantly participated in the production, music and lyrics.

In January 2009, she was awarded the Óčka Music Award in the Hip-hop and R'n'B category. In February 2009, she appeared as an opening act at a Prague concert as part of The Pussycat Dolls "Doll Domination Tour", which took place at Sportovní hala Fortuna.

In 2010, she went on a concert tour to South Korea and China, where she was preparing her third studio album. The pilot single "Come on Over" was broadcast on Evropa 2. She featured on the single with "Secret" by DJ and producer Michael Burian.

In October 2011, she released the single "This Life", produced by Romanian duo Royal Elements.

In addition to singing, she also began to host on the radio, first on Radio City, then on Evropa 2. Her column "The World According to Victoria" soon became one of the most popular parts of the Morning Show with Leoš Mareš and Patrik Hezucký. Her Instagram account was also a success, where she, with her alter ego "Ivanana", delved into all sorts of topics with humour and exaggeration.

Victoria later put her successful music career on hold to prioritize her family. In 2014, she married Scottish-born, British businessman David Thomas Blyth. In 2019, she moved to Turkey to join her husband and father of her children. In Turkey, she devoted herself to charity work, sports, the development of Czech-Turkish relations, and occasionally singing. She also regularly organized a charity Christmas bazaar. She founded the organization DazSpor, which specialized in organizing sporting events, including the famous Runkara half marathon in Ankara.

On 11 June 2024, she was murdered in Ankara, Turkey. Her 53-year-old husband David Thomas Blyth was suspected of the killing and subsequently committed suicide. Blyth reportedly shot his wife before turning the gun on himself. The couple's three young children were home at the time. The newspaper Hürriyet reported that an argument had started over Victoria's text messages and escalated. Their three children were taken in by the singer's Czech relatives. An investigation was launched.

Two months after her death, the Turkish running organization awarded her an in memoriam award for her contributions to sports and the community.

== Discography ==
=== Studio albums ===
Rok	Album	Rankings		Valuation	Sales
Rok	Album	CZ	SK	Valuation	Sales
2005	This Is Me!: Release date: 07.11.2005; Format: CD; Publisher: Universal Music	49	—	—	—
2008	Velvet: Release date: 26.05.2008; Format: CD; Publisher: Universal Music	—	—	—	—

=== Singles ===
Year	Song	Umístění v žebříčcích				Album
Year	Song	SK Top 100	SK Top 50	CZ Top 100	CZ Top 50	Album
2004	Křídla 04					This Is Me!
2005	Cry					This Is Me!
2005	Hotel California			5	1	This Is Me!
2008	Boneshakin' Hot			59	14	Velvet
2008	How did I get here			40	10	Velvet
2010	Come On Over			43	4	—
2016	You Lie	—	—	—	—	—
2019	Fire (feat. Fyah Son Bantu)	—	—	—	—	—

=== Featured singles ===
Year	Song	Rankings				Album
Year	Song	SK Top 100	SK Top 50	CZ Top 100	CZ Top 50	Album
2008	Zmrzlina ( Kristýna feat. Victoria)	36	6	—	—	… ešte váham
2010	Secret ( Michael Burian feat. Victoria)					—
2014	Miss Your Love (DeFuckTo feat. Victoria Velvet)					Andělé a démoni
2019	I Will Be There For You ( B & B feat. Victoria Velvet)	—	—	—	—	—

=== Compilation ===
- 2005: top20.cz 2005/1 – Universal, CD – 16. "Cry"
- 2005: top20.cz 2005/2 – Universal, CD – 6. "Hotel California"
- 2005: Hot! Summer Hits 2005 – Traxx/Universal, CD – 21. "Cry"
- 2006: R&B Revolution – Universal, CD – 11. "Hotel California"
- 2006: Top20.cz 2006 – Universal, CD – 19. "Bounce"
- 2007: Woman 2007 – Universal, CD – 17. "Cry"
- 2007: Songs for You – Universal, CD – 18. "Hotel California"
- 2008: Summer Hits 005 – Universal, DVD – "Boneshakin' Hot"
- 2008: Soundczech 19 – Report, CD – 12. "Vici Rock (Ha-Ha)" 1.10.
- 2008: Top20.cz 2008 / 2 – Universal, CD – 16. "Boneshakin' Hot" 13.10.
- 2008: 2005 – Universal, CD – 17. "Hotel California"
- 2009: Czech Slovak hits – Free your spirit! – Universal, CD – 14. "Hotel California"
- 2009: Top20.cz 2009/1 – Universal, CD – 19. "How Did I Get There"
- 2009: Dance League 133 – Traxx/Universal, CD – 16. Victoria feat. Royal Elements – "This Life (Radio Edit)”
- 2011: Czech Dance Charts Winter 2011 – Traxx/Universal, CD – CD2 11. Victoria feat. Royal Elements – "This Life (Extended Version)"

== Concert tours ==
- 2013: Funk Funky Tour
