= I Hate This Part =

2008 single by the Pussycat Dolls

Single by the Pussycat Dolls

from the album Doll Domination
- Released: October 4, 2008
- Recorded: 2008
- Studio: Boiler Room (Santa Monica); Cutfather (Copenhagen)
- Genre: Pop
- Length: 3:39
- Label: Interscope
- Songwriters: Wayne Hector; Lucas Secon; Jonas Jeberg; Mich "Cutfather" Hansen
- Producers: Jeberg; Hansen; Ron Fair

The Pussycat Dolls singles chronology
"Whatcha Think About That" (2008)	"I Hate This Part" (2008)	"Out of This Club" (2008)

Music video
- "I Hate This Part" on YouTube

"I Hate This Part" is a song recorded by American girl group the Pussycat Dolls for their second studio album Doll Domination (2008). It was written by Wayne Hector, Lucas Secon, Jonas Jeberg, Mich Hansen and produced by the latter two and Ron Fair. The track was initially intended for Leona Lewis and later for Nicole Scherzinger's unreleased solo album Her Name Is Nicole. After the album's cancellation, the song was given to the group. Musically, "I Hate This Part" is a pop ballad with elements of grinding R&B and dance music. Lyrically, it sees Scherzinger conversating with a partner just before they break up, adopting breathy and emotional vocals. The song was released as the third single from Doll Domination on October 4, 2008, by Interscope Records.

"I Hate This Part" was praised by music critics for its melodramatic nature, songwriting, and Scherzinger's vocal performance. In the US, the song peaked at number 11 on the Billboard Hot 100 and atop the Dance Club Songs. It was certified platinum by the Recording Industry Association of America (RIAA). Internationally, the song peaked at number one in Romania and in the top 10 in 13 other countries, including Australia, Canada, Ireland, and New Zealand. Its songwriters were honored by the American Society of Composers, Authors and Publishers (ASCAP) and Broadcast Music, Inc. (BMI) for their contributions to the song.

The accompanying music video for "I Hate This Part", directed by Joseph Kahn, is set in a desert and features close-up shots of each member and dance in the rain towards the end. While it was noted for being less suggestive compared to their previous music videos, critics negatively questioned the role of the other four members in the video. To promote "I Hate This Part", the Pussycat Dolls performed it on many television programs and awards show, including 2008 American Music Awards, 2009 NRJ Music Awards, The Ellen DeGeneres Show, and The Tonight Show with Jay Leno.

== Conception and development ==
"I Hate This Part" was conceived during a writing session for British singer Leona Lewis by Wayne Hector, Lucas Secon, Jonas Jeberg, and Mich Hansen. As the session drew to a close, Hector started playing a simple piano and came up with a melody, and asked Jeberg to sit next to him at the piano while he would sing a line; that later became the hook of the song. According to Jeberg, he was tasked to "[create] new chords from that melody" and began playing it as a piano theme which later turned "into a progression, where the top notes were in that melody;" this "became the link through the whole song." Although it started as a ballad, Hector wanted to add a beat, so Secon thought of the idea of turning it into an up-tempo or a mid-tempo. According to Hector, the song was completed within an hour, due to time constraints. That night, the song was e-mailed to producer Ron Fair who immediately responded, stating, "When can you come to L.A. to record this? I want this song for the Pussycat Dolls."

According to Nicole Scherzinger, lead singer of the group, the song was first recorded her debut studio album, Her Name Is Nicole. Scherzinger recorded her vocals at The Boiler Room in Santa Monica, California with the help of Mike "Angry" Eleopoulos, Tal Herzberg and Jeberg with the assistance from Johnathan Merritt. During the recording process, Scherzinger was vocally inspired by English and American rock singers Sting and Steve Perry. It was later mixed by Peter Mokran and Eric Weaver at Conway Studios in Hollywood, California. All instrumentation and programming were carried out by Jeberg who also produced the song with the Cutfather and Fair. Her Name is Nicole was met with multiple delays due to poor commercial reception of its singles. After its cancellation, the song was reassigned to the group's second album, Doll Domination. Prior to the album's cancellation, Interscope Records planned to rework several songs from her album, in order to save costs. In 2010, Scherzinger claimed it was her request to not release the album, as she felt that many of the songs, were better suited to the Dolls album.

== Music and lyrics ==
"I Hate This Part" is a pop ballad with elements of grinding R&B and dance music. According to IGN's Spence D., "the group goes to an even more streamlined pop approach. It is one of the several songs of Doll Domination that ditch the Doll's usual sexual image in favor of a more 'introspective, sad, lonely girl approach'." The song is written in the key of D minor with a time signature in common time and a tempo of 110 beats per minute and uses a simple chord progression of D^{4}—F^{(add 9)}—C—B♭^{2}. Instrumentation consists of a mournful piano, faux strings and syncopated rhythms. The song also features a dubbing drum loops similar to Kylie Minogue's "All I See" (2008) and Jordin Sparks' "One Step at a Time" (2008), which were also produced by Danish production duo Jeberg and Cutfather. The song's lyrics are about a conversation before the breakup of a relationship. The song is performed exclusively by Scherzinger, whose vocals were described as "breathless and understated." MTV's Debbie Newman compared her high-pitched delivery to that of Nelly Furtado. The ending was described as a "tear-soaked vocal outro".

== Release ==
"I Hate This Part" was released as third single from Doll Domination in the US and second in international markets. Member Melody Thornton first confirmed its single release during an interview with Rap-Up in September 2008. Commenting on its release strategy, Sal Cinquemani of Slant Magazine noted that "I Hate This Part" would have made a better follow-up to "When I Grow Up" "dousing [its] campfire with its more adult sound like the way 'Stickwitu' did following 'Don't Cha' in 2005." Interscope Records promoted the song to US contemporary hit radio stations on October 14, 2008. A CD single version of "I Hate This Part" was released in Germany on November 21, 2008, by Universal Music Group. A remix version subtitled "Dave Audé Dance Hybrid Mix" was released in the US on December 16, 2008.

== Critical reception ==
In a review for the Daily Record, Rick Fulton wrote that in "I Hate This Part" the Pussycat Dolls "really step up to those domination wishes". Nick Bond of MTV Australia described the song as "superb" whilst regarding it as one of the musical highlights of Doll Domination. David Balls from Digital Spy gave the song three stars out of five. Balls wrote that the song's slowed down production does not "[put] a halt to their momentum." Impressed by the song's production and Scherzinger's vocals, he felt that it will "be a fixture on many pop fans' iPods come Christmas time." Nick Levine from the same entertainment website, called the song "wonderfully melodramatic". BBC's Fraser McAlpine complimented Scherzinger for conveying emotions without being sexy.

The Sunday Times reviewer Elan Priya considered the song an exception to how the album "lacks any distinct personality". Sal Cinquemani of Slant Magazine criticized the producers for recycling similar drum loops heard in Minogue's and Sparks' songs, but felt the songwriting in "I Hate this Part" was superior. Similarly, Spence D. from IGN praised several aspects of the song's production, but labelled certain instrumentation as "earnest" and the vocal performance as forced. Rashod Ollison of The Baltimore Sun commented that romantical song's of the album such as "I Hate This Part" fails to give the Pussycat Dolls any musical identity, opining that Scherzinger whines throughout the song. Similarly, Rudy Klapper from Sputnikmusic commented that "I Hate This Part" is "noteworthy only for [its] uncanny resemblance to numerous other radio hits, and come off, for the most part, as poor attempts to diversify the group's sound" describing it as "ubiquitous".

In October 2010, Hansen, Jeberg, and, Secon were awarded the Pop Award at the 2010 BMI London Awards. Meanwhile, Hector was recognized for writing "I Hate This Part" by the American Society of Composers, Authors and Publishers (ASCAP) at their annual London awards. Village Voice's Pazz & Jop list included "I Hate This Part" as one of the best singles of 2009.

== Commercial performance ==
In the United States, "I Hate This Part" debuted at number 79 on the Billboard Hot 100 in December 2008; it later peaked at number 11 in its eighth week and spent a total of 20 weeks on the chart. On the US Hot Dance Club Songs "I Hate This Part" was the Pussycat Dolls' fourth consecutive number one; it peaked atop for two weeks. In the United Kingdom, the song debuted at number 36 on the UK Singles Chart, while their previous single "When I Grow Up" was charting on its ninth week at number 18. On its fifth week, the song peaked at number 12, breaking the Pussycat Dolls' career-opening streak of top-10 singles. In January 2013, the song was certified silver by the British Phonographic Industry (BPI) for track-equivalent sales of 200,000 units in the UK. The Official Charts Company (OCC) ranks "I Hate This Part" as the Pussycat Dolls' seventh most successful song on the singles chart, and the 100th best-selling song by a girl group.

"I Hate This Part" achieved its highest position in Romania peaking at the summit, and achieved top-ten placements in Belgium (Wallonia) [2], the Czech Republic (3), France (3), Hungary (3), Venezuela (4), Belgium (Flanders) [5], Canada (5), Hungary (5), Austria (7), Mexico (8), Bulgaria (9), Ireland (9), Switzerland (9), New Zealand (9), Australia (10), and Slovakia (10). The song entered Germany (12), Scotland (14), Denmark (15), Norway (16), Finland (19), Netherlands (27), and the Commonwealth of Independent States (30).

== Promotion ==
=== Music video ===
Joseph Khan was chosen to direct the visual, after directing the Pussycat Dolls on their previous single, "When I Grow Up". Prior filming the video, Thornton acknowledged to Rap-Up that they would be filming the music video during her 24th birthday revealing it would be filmed in the desert. Throughout the clip, the Pussycat Dolls have close-up against different backdrops and pose suggestively. Scenes include Scherzinger playing the piano, and in a junkyard with abandoned cars. Towards the end, the group performs a choreographed dance routine in the rain. In comparison to previous music videos, Nick Levine from Digital Spy, felt that "I Hate this Part" "is a less racy affair than usual." John Kordosh of Yahoo! Music criticized the video for making the other four members redundant writing, they "looking good in situations that have nothing to do with anything." Similarly, Adam White, who wrote a profile piece on the group for The Daily Telegraph following their 2019 reunion, revisited the music video commenting Scherzinger gets all the "searing close-ups, while the rest of the band gesticulate in the background. It's difficult to see whether they're even lip-synching." It was nominated for Best International Video – Group at the 2009 MuchMusic Video Awards.

=== Live performances ===
At their 2008 American Music Awards performance they donned all-rubber outfits and performed a medley of "I Hate This Part" and "When I Grow Up", in which the performance included stripper poles. In December 2008, the appeared on the Ellen Degeneres Show and on The Hills: Live Finale from NYC to perform the single. The following month, the group performed "I Hate This Part" on The Tonight Show with Jay Leno. The following week they travelled to Cannes, France and appeared on the 2009 NRJ Music Awards to perform "I Hate This Part" and "When I Grow Up". While on tour with Spears, they stopped by MuchOnDemand in Toronto, Canada to perform "I Hate This Part" and "Jai Ho! (You Are My Destiny)".

== Track listings and formats ==
Digital single

1. "I Hate This Part" – 3:38

CD single

1. "I Hate This Part" (album version) – 3:45
2. "I Hate This Part" (Digital Dog Remix – Club Edit) – 3:05

European maxi CD single

1. "I Hate This Part" (album version) – 3:45
2. "I Hate This Part" (Digital Dog Remix – Club Edit) – 3:05
3. "I Hate This Part" (Dave Audé Remix – Radio) – 3:39
4. "I Hate This Part" (music video) – 3:42

Digital EP

1. "I Hate This Part" (Moto Blanco Remix – Club Mix) – 7:47
2. "I Hate This Part" (Digital Dog Remix – Club Mix) – 5:50
3. "I Hate This Part" (Dave Audé Remix – Club) – 8:18
4. "I Hate This Part" (Karmatronic Club Mix) – 6:28

German digital single

1. "I Hate This Part" (Dave Audé Dance Hybrid Mix) – 3:33
2. "Don't Cha Hate This When I Grow Up Medley" (Dave Audé Mix) – 3:35

French digital EP

1. "I Hate This Part" (Dave Audé Remix – Radio) – 3:40
2. "I Hate This Part" (Moto Blanco Remix – Radio) – 3:41
3. "I Hate This Part" (Karmatronic Club Radio) – 3:25
4. "I Hate This Part" (Digital Dog Remix – Club Edit) – 3:05

== Credits and personnel ==
Credits adapted from the liner notes of Doll Domination.

Recording

- Recorded at Cutfather Studios (Copenhagen, Denmark); The Boiler Room (Santa Monica, California)
- Mixed at Conway Studios (Hollywood, California)

Personnel

- Mike "Angry" Eleopoulos – recording
- Ron Fair – producer, vocal producer
- Mich "Cutfather" Hansen – songwriter, producer
- Wayne Hector – songwriter
- Tal Herzberg – recording, Pro Tools
- Jonas Jeberg – songwriter, producer, recording, instruments, programming
- Nicole Scherzinger – vocal producer (Note: Scherzinger was credited as a vocal producer on Doll Domination's EP re-release, Doll Domination – The Mini Collection (2009).)
- Lucas Secon – songwriter
- Johnathan Merritt – assistant recording
- Peter Mokran – mixing
- Eric Weaver – mixing assistant

== Charts ==
=== Weekly charts ===
2008–2009 weekly chart performance
Chart	Peak position
Australia (ARIA)	10
Australia (ARIA) Digital Dog Remix	99
Australian Urban (ARIA)	1
Austria (Ö3 Austria Top 40)	7
Belgium (Ultratop 50 Flanders)	5
Belgium (Ultratop 50 Wallonia)	2
Bulgaria (BAMP)	9
Canada Hot 100 (Billboard)	5
Canada CHR/Top 40 (Billboard)	8
Canada Hot AC (Billboard)	7
CIS Airplay (TopHit)	30
Czech Republic Airplay (ČNS IFPI)	3
Denmark (Tracklisten)	15
Euro Digital Song Sales (Billboard)	12
Finland (Suomen virallinen lista)	19
France (SNEP)	3
Germany (GfK)	12
Hungary (Rádiós Top 40)	5
Hungary (Single Top 40)	3
Ireland (IRMA)	9
Japan (Japan Hot 100)	20
Mexico Ingles Airplay (Billboard)	8
Netherlands (Dutch Top 40)	27
Netherlands (Single Top 100)	53
New Zealand (Recorded Music NZ)	9
Norway (VG-lista)	16
Romania (UPFR)	1
Russia Airplay (TopHit)	33
Scottish Singles Sales (Official Charts)	14
Slovakia Airplay (ČNS IFPI)	10
Switzerland (Schweizer Hitparade)	9
Turkey Top 20 (Billboard)	10
UK Singles (Official Charts)	12
US Billboard Hot 100	11
US Adult Pop Airplay (Billboard)	32
US Dance Club Songs (Billboard)	1
US Dance Airplay (Billboard)	5
US Pop Airplay (Billboard)	11
Venezuela Pop Rock (Record Report)	4

=== Monthly charts ===
2009 monthly chart performance
Chart	Peak position
Brazil (Brasil Hot 100 Airplay)	38
Brazil (Brasil Hot Pop Songs)	24

=== Year-end charts ===
2008 year-end chart performance
Chart	Position
Australia (ARIA)	60
Australia Urban (ARIA)	19
UK Singles (OCC)	92

2009 year-end chart performance
Chart	Position
Australia Urban (ARIA)	42
Austria (Ö3 Austria Top 40)	52
Belgium (Ultratop 50 Flanders)	45
Belgium (Ultratop 50 Wallonia)	14
Brazil (Crowley)	9
Canada (Canadian Hot 100)	29
European Hot 100 Singles (Billboard)	21
France (SNEP)	9
Germany (Media Control GfK)	83
Hungary (Rádiós Top 40)	21
Russia Airplay (TopHit)	190
Switzerland (Schweizer Hitparade)	58
UK Singles (OCC)	190
US Billboard Hot 100	50
US Dance Club Play (Billboard)	7
US Hot Dance Airplay (Billboard)	16

== Certifications ==
Certifications and sales
Region	Certification	Certified units/sales
Australia (ARIA)	Gold	35,000^{^}
Belgium (BRMA)	Gold	
Brazil (Pro-Música Brasil) DMS	Gold	30,000^{*}
Brazil (Pro-Música Brasil)	Platinum	60,000^{‡}
New Zealand (RMNZ)	Gold	7,500^{*}
United Kingdom (BPI)	Gold	400,000^{‡}
United States (RIAA)	Platinum	1,000,000^{^}
^{*} Sales figures based on certification alone.^{^} Shipments figures based on certification alone.^{‡} Sales+streaming figures based on certification alone.

== Release history ==
Release dates and formats
Region	Date	Format(s)	Version(s)	Label(s)	Ref.
Australia	October 4, 2008	Digital download	Original	Universal	
United States	October 21, 2008	Contemporary hit radio	Original	Interscope	
Ireland	October 30, 2008	Digital download	Original	Universal	
Australia	November 1, 2008	CD; digital download	Original; Digital Dog Remix	Universal	
Ireland	November 17, 2008	Digital download (EP)	Remixes	Universal	
Germany	November 21, 2008	Maxi CD	Original; Digital Dog Remix; Dave Audé Remix	Universal	
United Kingdom	November 24, 2008	CD	Original; Digital Dog Remix	Polydor	
Germany	December 12, 2008	Digital download	Dave Audé Dance Hybrid Mix; Dave Audé Medley	Universal	
United States	December 16, 2008	Digital download	Dave Audé Dance Hybrid Mix	Interscope	
France	December 22, 2008	Digital download (EP)	Remixes	Polydor	
France	January 19, 2009	CD	Original; Digital Dog Remix	Polydor	
United States	February 3, 2009	Digital download (EP)	Remixes	Interscope	

== See also ==
- List of number-one singles in Romania
- List of number-one dance singles of 2009 (U.S.)
