= Doll Domination =

- Standard cover (Note: Deluxe edition cover features the title against a blue background instead of red. Doll Domination 2.0 cover uses the same artwork as Doll Domination – The Mini Collection.)

Studio album by the Pussycat Dolls
- Released: September 19, 2008
- Recorded: 2008
- Studios: Boiler Room (Santa Monica); Canaan Road (Hollywood); Carrington House (Atlanta); Chalice (Los Angeles); Chocolate Factory (Chicago); Circle House (Miami); Conway (Hollywood); D.M.I (East Orange); Hit Factory Criteria (Miami); Nomad (Dallas); Record Plant (Los Angeles); Zac (Atlanta)
- Genres: Pop; dance; R&B
- Length: 62:40
- Label: Interscope
- Producers: Chase N. Cashe; Cutfather; Esther Dean; Kara DioGuardi; Sean "The Pen" Garrett; Fernando Garibay; Jerome "JRoc" Harmon; Tal Herzberg; Hit-Boy; Jonas Jeberg; Rodney "Darkchild" Jerkins; R. Kelly; Clubba Lang; Ne-Yo; Polow da Don; Shea Taylor; Timbaland; Quiz & Larossi

The Pussycat Dolls chronology
Live from London (2006)	Doll Domination (2008)	Doll Domination – The Mini Collection (2009)

Singles from Doll Domination
- 1. "When I Grow Up" Released: May 27, 2008; 2. "Whatcha Think About That" Released: August 29, 2008; 3. "I Hate This Part" Released: October 4, 2008; 4. "Out of This Club" Released: October 12, 2008; 5. "Bottle Pop" Released: February 23, 2009

Doll Domination is the second studio album by American girl group the Pussycat Dolls. It was released on September 19, 2008, by Interscope Records. The album's release was preceded by the departure of the group's longest-standing member Carmit Bachar. Its production commenced in early 2008, employing previous collaborators Sean Garrett, Polow da Don and Timbaland, as well as Rodney Jerkins, J-Roc and Chase N. Cashe. Polow da Don, R. Kelly and Snoop Dogg also make guest performances on the album. Several songs on Doll Domination were originally recorded for the lead singer Nicole Scherzinger's shelved solo debut album, Her Name Is Nicole, which was shelved after the under-performance of its preceding singles.

Primarily a pop, dance and R&B album that also blend elements of hip hop, electropop and soul music with lyrics that tackle fame, sexuality and relationships. The majority of the album's lead vocals were provided by Scherzinger with support from Melody Thornton, whilst the remaining group members are only credited for background vocals. Upon release, Doll Domination received mixed reviews from music critics. The album debuted at number four on the US Billboard 200 becoming the group's highest-charting album. It experienced similar peaks in international territories, debuting at number three in Canada and number four in Australia and on the United Kingdom albums chart. Doll Domination was later reissued in multiple versions throughout 2009. The album was supported with a world tour titled Doll Domination Tour in 2009.

The album was preceded by the release of the US Billboard Hot 100 top-ten single "When I Grow Up" and the UK top-ten hit "Whatcha Think About That" (featuring Missy Elliott). Other successful singles were "I Hate This Part", "Jai Ho! (You Are My Destiny)", and "Hush Hush; Hush Hush", all of which reached the top ten in numerous countries worldwide. Although "Jai Ho! (You Are My Destiny)" became a number-one hit in Australia, Ireland, Finland, among other countries, the single caused tension within the group as Scherzinger was billed as a featured artist. Despite their commercial success, unhappiness of Scherzinger's spotlight and prominence within the group grew leading to a public outburst by Thornton during the tour. In early 2010, the group disbanded to pursue solo projects, before reforming in 2019 with the promise of new music. In 2019, the R. Kelly collaboration "Out of This Club" was removed from digital retailers and streaming services, following the airing of the Surviving R. Kelly documentary and subsequent abuse allegations against the singer.

== Background ==
The Pussycat Dolls debut album PCD (2005) was a commercial success, selling seven million copies worldwide, (Note: Worldwide sales figures for PCD as of August 2008.) and includes their breakthrough single "Don't Cha". The album's success established the group as a viable act in the music industry, earning them a reputation among the century's few breakout successes. This helped the groups' brand and their label Interscope Records to expand into various business avenues which include lines of makeup, perfumes, and television. The Pussycat Dolls Present: The Search for the Next Doll premiered in March 2007 with the aim to add a seventh member to the group. Asia Nitollano ultimately won the competition but quit shortly after the finale to pursue a solo career.

Meanwhile, lead singer Nicole Scherzinger was preparing to launch her solo career via the release of her debut album, Her Name is Nicole. It was tentatively set for June 2007. The album was met with multiple delays due to poor commercial reception of its singles. Several other members ventured into works outside the group. Ashley Roberts made her film debut in Make It Happen (2008), Jessica Sutta collaborated with Dave Audé ("Make It Last") and Paul van Dyk ("White Lies"), and Melody Thornton was featured on Jibbs' single "Go Too Far". In March 2008, Carmit Bachar announced via the group's website that she had left the group intending to pursue a solo career. At the time of her departure, she had been the longest member of the group, joining in 1995 when they were a burlesque act. On March 10, they performed for the first time without Bachar for the Operation MySpace concert which honored US troops stationed in Kuwait.

== Development ==
=== Her Name is Nicole sessions ===
To minimize expenses, Interscope Records planned to rework several songs from Her Name Is Nicole before the album's cancellation. It was reported that the label invested $1.5 million on the album with Scherzinger recording about 300 songs. In 2010, Scherzinger claimed it was her request to not release the album, as she felt that many of the songs, were better suited to the Dolls album. After PCD (2005) was completed, Scherzinger began working on her solo album a wide range of artists like, Akon, Ne-Yo, Timbaland, Kanye West, will.i.Am and Snow Patrol's Gary Lightbody. She sought to establish herself as a versatile artist, separate from her identity as the group's lead singer, showcasing facets of her personality that had not been fully explored. "Happily Never After" and "Who's Gonna Love You" were included in the final track listing of the album. The latter was written by Scherzinger, Polow da Don and Kara DioGuardi. It was first previewed on Scherzinger's website in February 2008. The former was one of the two songs Ne-Yo gave to Scherzinger after being originally written for Britney Spears. During an interview with The Guardian, Ne-Yo recounted his experience writing songs for Spears and explained there were multiple scheduled sessions where she was supposed to provide input on the tracks, but she never attended. Ne-Yo continued working on the songs until Spears' widely publicized head-shaving incident where her team stopped responding. During this period, he met Scherzinger. After news broke that Scherzinger recorded the song, Spears' management wondered why he gave away the song, to which Ne-Yo replied, "It may've been written with Britney in mind, but it's not hers."

Another song written with Spears in mind was "When I Grow Up". It was rejected by her record label Jive Records at the time of the creation of Spears' fifth studio album Blackout (2007). The Rock City songwriters re-wrote the lyrics with Scherzinger in mind. The song would be eventually be released as the lead single of Doll Domination. Another future single, "I Hate This Part", was conceived during a writing session for British singer Leona Lewis by Wayne Hector, Lucas Secon, Jonas Jeberg, and Mich Hansen. It was sent to Scherzinger, after Ron Fair requested it for the Pussycat Dolls. During the recording process, Scherzinger was vocally inspired by rock singers Sting and Steve Perry.

=== Focus on the Pussycat Dolls ===
In February 2008, the group's founder Robin Antin confirmed that Scherzinger was back in the studio working on the group's second album. The following month, Fair confirmed the group had recorded five songs for the album and would be working with past collaborators such as Sean Garrett, CeeLo Green and Timbaland. Scherzinger acknowledged that Timbaland was an executive producer of the album, stating that "he had his own visions of what he wanted for the group." Timbaland and his associates contributed to four songs in the album: "Magic", "Halo", "In Person", and "Whatchamacallit", though the album omits Timbaland's credit as an executive producer. Garret, who previously produced "Buttons", wrote and produced "Bottle Pop" with Fernando Garibay. Garibay was then contacted by Jimmy Iovine to work with Lady Gaga, who was an upcoming songwriter at that time to write songs for the group. Gaga was signed to Akon's KonLive Distribution, who was also contracted to write for the group. Experiencing writer's block, he contacted producer RedOne and together they created "Just Dance". They presented it to Iovine who briefly suggested that the song be given to the group, but Akon felt the song belonged to Gaga. Green produced "Love Gun" for the album; however, it wasn't included in the final track listing. Scherzinger described the song as having 60s and 70s influences, while the vocals were compared to Tina Turner and Aretha Franklin. The song was later included in his own studio album, The Lady Killer (2010), with vocals featuring Lauren Bennett. Thornton released her version that same year.

== Composition ==
Doll Domination is a dance-pop album, with dance, electronic, and R&B elements. Critics noted that it follows the same formula as their debut album; self-assuring themes, sultry lyrics and thumping dance beats. Thornton describes the album as vocally diverse, that blends R&B, hip-hop, slow jams, alternative, and soft rock. It aims to showcase group's vocal abilities while evolving musically with more mature themes, like in "I Hate This Part".

=== Songs ===
Doll Domination opens with "When I Grow Up", an uptempo electropop song, built around "bouncy synth lines" and a "thudding" bassline and alongside heavy usage of sirens, handclaps and pitch-shifted vocals. Scherzinger adopts similar vocal stylings on the song to Spears. Described as the album's ideological centerpiece, it celebrates fame, luxury, and youth-driven materialism and acts as a manifesto of celebrity culture. Thornton highlights the lyrics "Be careful what you wish for; 'Cause you just might get it," which serves as a warning regarding success in the entertainment industry. Electronica track "Bottle Pop" features rapper Snoop Dogg. It uses sexual innuendo with Scherzinger adopting "breathy vocals". In "Whatcha Think About That", the Pussycat Dolls adopt a spunky attitude as they assert independence against a controlling boyfriend, reversing gender roles. With three verses of brash, risqué rap, they are joined by rapper Missy Elliott who references Katy Perry's "I Kissed a Girl" (2008). It is a mid tempo electropop and R&B song which is built around a distinctive bhangra-ish guitar riff. In "I Hate This Part" the group adopts a more polished pop style, moving away from their typical sexual image and opting for a more reflective and melancholic "sad, lonely girl" approach. With lyrics about a dooming relationship, the song sees Scherzinger in a conversation before a breakup. With elements of dance and R&B music, the song's production features a mournful piano, faux strings and syncopated rhythms. In "Takin' Over the World" sees the return of the Dolls signature sound: processed vocal harmonies layered over electro beats. It uses an Australian didgeridoo as they aim for "a global-pop sound". "Out of This Club" is a mid tempo R&B song with a lush beat and simple piano melodies. With lyrics about settling down after a wild party life, Scherzinger "coos and flirts" with featured artist R. Kelly. "Who's Gonna Love You" features a lively dance beat with 80s influences, reminiscent of Janet Jackson's music.

"Happily Never After" is an acoustic ballad, well suited for Scherzinger's vocal range. Using a straightforward melody, she narrates a story of a woman who leaves a harmful relationship. Though she starts off uncertain, she ultimately finds a sense of relief. "Magic" features unconventional Middle Eastern rhythms and talking duck samples. It was described as a "dark, dissonant club banger". "Halo" is a grand, synth-driven track with a rich orchestration, featuring prominent beats and a polished synth sound. "In Person" is a lively, jazzy track with a distinctive two-step rhythm. Emulating Tina Turner, Scherzinger threatens to "hurt" and "kick" a deadbeat partner. "Elevator" is "spacey-R&B track" with a lot of catchy hooks. Thornton can be heard singing part of the bridge. "Hush Hush" is pop ballad described to having "down tempo forlornness". Scherzinger's vocals were described as powerful, with her exaggerated pronunciation adding to the dramatic delivery. The song portrays the Pussycat Dolls as strong, independent women who don't depend on men for help. "Love the Way You Love Me" has smooth, polished pop sound with a playful, otherworldly quality. The song "Whatchamacalit" combines J-Pop influences with a style reminiscent of Tim Burton and Danny Elfman. Scherzinger playfully challenges her competitors about her fashion choices and her partner's qualities. The song stands out as the only one where she directly engages with other women. The standard edition of Doll Domination closes with "I'm Done", a soft and gentle ballad.

=== Bonus tracks ===
"Lights, Camera, Action" features New Kids on the Block, with an alternate solo version is featured on their The Block (2008) album. It has a soft, airy quality, where the groups sing about doing a homemade porn recording. In "Perhaps, Perhaps, Perhaps" the group draws from their burlesque influences when it came to re-recording the classic standard. The album additionally features J. R. Rotem's remix of Scherzinger's "Baby Love". The original version is a folk-tinged R&B ballad where she uses a southern twang whilst singing romantical lyrics. On the European double-disc deluxe version of the album, each member was credited to a solo track. The first new track on the second disc is Sutta's "If I Was a Man". It's a dance track that explores the idea of switching roles with a man, imagining how it would feel to treat him the same way he treats her. "Space" sang by Thornton follows, was distinguished for her melismatic vocal runs. Wyatt's cover of Jane Child's "Don't Wanna Fall in Love" stays true to the original, replicating the backing track closely. The second CD rounds up with Roberts' "Played" and Scherzinger's "Until U Love U".

Four new songs were introduced in the 2009 reissues of the album including, "Top of the World". "Hush Hush; Hush Hush", a house music remix of the song "Hush Hush". It incorporates elements of Gloria Gaynor's 1978 disco song "I Will Survive". "Jai Ho! (You Are My Destiny)" is a pop interpretation of the original Hindi song "Jai Ho" that was included on the soundtrack to the film Slumdog Millionaire (2008). Musically, song preserves the original's electronic dance beats, Japanese taiko drums, and Hindi melodies with vocals of a rough English translation of the Hindi lyrics, sung by Scherzinger. "Painted Windows" was described as having a stomping and distorted sound.

== Marketing ==
=== Title and artwork ===
In June 2008, the album's title was revealed on the group's official website. According to Thornton, the title for the album originated during a promotional tour for PCD in London. One of their makeup artists made a remark, describing their busy schedule as "Doll Domination". The group liked the idea and shared it with their label, which also supported the concept. The album's artwork was unveiled through group's official website in August 2008. Photographed by Matthew Rolston, it depicts each member straddled on her own motorcycle bedecked with the initial of their first name. Names of various cities where listed on the road. Scherzinger wears a turquoise bra while three of the members leather jackets over their tight-fitting bustiers. Maura Johnston of Idolator saw the cover as a step for the four members besides Scherzinger "to finally break through and maybe, someday, have personalities of their own."

=== Release and promotion ===
Doll Domination was first released in Germany on September 19, 2008. In their native country, the album was released on September 23, 2008. Six months after the original, Interscope Records released Doll Domination 2.0 in Australia on April 25, 2009. Doll Domination 2.0 features ten songs, including the remix of "Hush Hush; Hush Hush" and several newly recorded songs. Nick Bond of MTV Australia commented although "confusing [...] releasing a succinct package of the better songs from 'Doll Domination' is actually the smartest move they've made for a while." He ended the review by writing, "while it's looking increasingly unlikely that the group will survive to a third album, this mini-greatest hits makes for a fitting send-off."

On August 3, 2009, Doll Domination 3.0 was released in the UK using the original cover art. It includes all of the songs from the Standard Edition as well as songs from the Mini Collection.

=== Singles ===
The album's lead single "When I Grow Up" was released on May 27, 2008, and serviced to contemporary hit radio stations on June 1, 2008. The single was received favorably by contemporary music critics, many of whom highlighted it as a stand-out track from Doll Domination. The song peaked at number nine on the Billboard Hot 100, becoming the group's highest-charting single since "Buttons" (2006). The accompanying music video was nominated in five categories at the 2008 MTV Video Music Awards, and went on to win Best Dance Video.

"Whatcha Think About That", which features guest vocals by American recording artist Missy Elliott, was released and serviced to contemporary hit radio stations on September 9, 2008, as the second single. The song failed to enter the Billboard Hot 100, however it did manage to peak at number nine on the UK Singles Chart. The burlesque-inspired video was directed by Diane Martel and was released in October 6.

"I Hate This Part" was released on October 4, 2008, as the second international single, and impacted contemporary hit radio stations on October 20, 2008, as the third single in the United States. The song received positive feedback from music critics, who commended the song's production and Scherzinger's vocals. The song peaked at number eleven on the US Billboard Hot 100 chart and topped the US Hot Dance Club Songs chart. It additionally peaked within the top-ten of several international singles charts including in Australia and New Zealand. The accompanying music video was released on October 11, and was filmed in Los Angeles featuring a desert-themed concept.

"Out of This Club", a collaboration between R. Kelly and Polow da Don, was sent to urban contemporary stations on October 12, 2008, as the third single in the United States. The song debuted and peaked at number 24 on the Billboard Bubbling Under R&B/Hip-Hop Singles, a component chart that represents the 25 songs that failed to make an impact on the Hot R&B/Hip-Hop Songs chart.

On February 23, 2009, a remix of "Bottle Pop" was released in New Zealand replacing Snoop Dogg with Devolo. The version featuring Snoop Dogg was released on March 6 as the fourth single in Australia and some European countries. In Oceania, the song achieved a moderate success peaking within the top-twenty in Australia and New Zealand. In the United States, the song topped the Hot Dance Club Play chart.

=== Re-release singles ===
Following A. R. Rahman's win at the 2009 Academy Awards for Best Original Song and Best Original Score for "Jai Ho" and the soundtrack of Slumdog Millionaire, the English pop version entitled "Jai Ho! (You Are My Destiny)" was released the day after. Nicole Scherzinger was credited as a featured artist, creating tension within the group. The track peaked at number fifteen on the Billboard Hot 100, after charging eighty-five places to make the largest weekly leap from number 100. Internationally, it achieved greater success across Europe and Oceania, reaching the top of the charts in 17 countries including Australia, Finland and Ireland. The accompanying music video recreated the last scene from the movie Slumdog Millionaire.

"Hush Hush; Hush Hush", a remix of the original album's song "Hush Hush" was serviced to contemporary hit radio stations on May 26, 2009, as the final single of Doll Domination. The song peaked at number seventy-three and forty-one on the United States and Canada respectively. Internationally, the single reached number two in Turkey, ten in Australia, and the top twenty in most European countries. Additionally, the song went on to become the group's sixth consecutive number one on the Billboard Hot Dance Club Songs chart.

=== Live performances ===
The Pussycat Dolls first performed "When I Grow Up" on Jimmy Kimmel Live! on May 20, 2008, on June 1 at the 2008 MTV Movie Awards and on June 12 on So You Think You Can Dance. The album was additionally promoted through an episode of the documentary series E! True Hollywood Story, which premiered through E! on May 23 and hosted VH1's special Maxim Hot 100 on May 27. In August 2008, the Pussycat Dolls traveled to Asia to open the 2008 MTV Asia Awards in Kuala Lumpur, Malaysia, performing "Buttons" and "When I Grow Up" on August 2 and appeared on the second day of the Singfest music festival in Singapore on August 4. On August 29, they performed "When I Grow Up" on Today and several days later performed at the annual charity fundraiser event Fashion Rocks. The group then performed five songs at a Walmart Soundcheck showcase: "I Hate This Part", "Takin' Over the World" and "When I Grow Up" from Doll Domination, and "Buttons" and "Don't Cha" from PCD. Towards the end of September 2008 they traveled to the United Kingdom and performed "When I Grow Up" at the Vodafone Awards, GMTV, This Morning and the Sound and One Night Only and appeared on the covers of The Big Issue and QX.

On October 14, the group traveled to Australia to perform at the Sydney Opera House as part of a series of concerts promoting Xbox 360 and the video game Lips; the following day they performed a two-song set on Sunrise. On October 28, the group performed "Whatcha Think About That" along with Missy Elliott on Dancing with the Stars. On November 21, they performed a medley of "I Hate This Part" and "When I Grow Up" at the 2008 American Music Awards. The performance included stripper poles, and the girls donned all-rubber outfits. On December 12, the group performed "I Hate This Part" on The Hills Finale Live from NYC. The group went on to perform on January 7 on The Tonight Show with Jay Leno, on January 18 they performed along with "When I Grow Up" on the 2009 NRJ Music Awards in Cannes, France. "Jai Ho! (You Are My Destiny)" was performed through March and April 2009 on various television appearances: Late Night with Jimmy Fallon (March 10), MuchOnDemand (March 18), on the 2009 Kids' Choice Awards with a medley of "When I Grow Up" (March 28), and on The Ellen DeGeneres Show (April 20). Furthermore, the group performed the song in and episode of One Life to Live. In the episode, the students of Llanview High win a radio contest, bringing the group to perform at their prom. Scheringer cameos in a scene.

== Critical reception ==
Professional ratings
Aggregate scores
Source	Rating
Metacritic	51/100
Review scores
Source	Rating
AllMusic	2/5 stars
Entertainment Weekly	C−
IGN	7/10 stars
Los Angeles Times	1.5/4 stars
MusicOMH	1/5 stars
Newsday	C−
Rolling Stone	2.5/5 stars
Slant Magazine	3/5 stars
USA Today	2.5/5 stars
Yahoo! Music UK	6/10 stars

At Metacritic, which assigns a normalized rating out of 100 to reviews from mainstream critics, the album received an average score of 51, which indicates "mixed or average reviews", based on 12 reviews. Writing for Billboard, Mariel Concepcion provided a favorable review, opining that the album has all "the elements (self-assuring themes, sultry lyrics and lots of skin-tight latex) to mimic the victory of [PCD]." Steve Jones of USA Today agreed with Concepcion, but added they are "more interested in pushing their brand than pushing boundaries". Writing for Slant Magazine, Sal Cinquemani found that "it was smart to spotlight the, talents of the other pussycats" following the cancellation of Her Name is Nicole. Writing for The Washington Post, Allison Stewart noted that Scherzinger has "more of a central role" and viewed Doll Domination as "a consolation prize" after the multiple delays on her solo album. Jon Pareles of The New York Times noted that the ballads "are a move toward expanding the franchise" seeking "a little empathy along with the attitude". In a more mixed review, Rolling Stone's Christian Hoard singled out several songs but concluded that the record "sounds like the Dolls just threw everything they had against the charts to see if anything would stick."

Elan Priya of The Times wrote that the album "lacks any distinct personality". August Brown from the Los Angeles Times noted that the tracks don't come "within [the] sniffing distance of 'Don't Cha,' [...] Instead, they act out as "a series of signifiers to other, more interesting, moments in recent pop culture.". Likewise, Ken Capobianco of The Boston Globe stated that the album does not live up to their debut album PCD. Margeaux Watson of Entertainment Weekly graded the album a C− criticizing Doll Domination's longevity "especially for a group that brazenly emphasizes style over substance." Glenn Gamboa of Newsday wrote, "as far as music is concerned, they are not the dominators, they are the dominated," adding that "they sound like they are at the mercy of their songwriters and producers, making for huge swings in quality. Stephen Thomas Erlewine of AllMusic found it ironic that a group coming from a burlesque revue sings songs about "empowerment, heartbreak, love, fame and wealth, but never about sex." He ended his review writing, "it's a lot better to hear pinups sing a song of striptease than a song of love." Nic Oliver from MusicOMH was also more negative of the record, opining that it is an "album heading straight for the bargain bins" under the file "dispiriting". Katie Toms of The Guardian criticised the album for being "aimed at five-year-old girls".

On his list of the five worst albums of 2008, Chris Willman from Entertainment Weekly placed Doll Domination fifth, criticizing the song's "double entendres" aimed at their "target audience of 15-year-olds". IGN ranked Doll Domination third on their list of the ten worst albums, commenting that it the "record stands out because it is so exceptionally retched." It was voted as the third worst album in the 2008 Popjustice Readers' Poll.

== Commercial performance ==
Doll Domination is considered a commercial disappointment. In the United States, it debuted at number four on the Billboard 200 chart selling 79,000 copies in the week ending September 29, according to Nielsen Music. Though it marked their highest peak on the chart, it sold 20,000 copies less than its predecessor in its first week. In the following week, the album dropped to number fourteen. By April 2009, it sold less than 400,000 copies in the US. In Canada, the album debuted and peaked at number three with sales of 12,000. It was certified platinum by the Music Canada for shipments exceeding 80,000 copies. In Australia, the album debuted at number four on the ARIA Albums Chart in October 2008. Following the release of 2.0., it was merged with the original chart entry, re-entering the chart as a single release and reaching a peak position of eight. It received a platinum certification from the Australian Recording Industry Association (ARIA) for shipping over 70,000 copies. In New Zealand it debuted at number eight and spent eight weeks in the chart. In 2021, It received a platinum certification from the Recorded Music NZ (RMNZ) for selling 15,000 album-equivalent units.

In the United Kingdom, the album debuted at number four on the UK Albums Chart dated September 28, 2008, selling 31,823 units and eclipsing the number eight debut (23,800 sales) and number seven peak of their debut album PCD. In 2022, the album was certified Platinum by the British Phonographic Industry (BPI) in recognition of sales of 300,000 copies in the UK. In France, Doll Domination debuted at number sixteen on the French Albums Chart on September 29, 2008, staying at that spot for two weeks. It has been certified Gold by the Syndicat National de l'Édition Phonographique.

== Tour ==
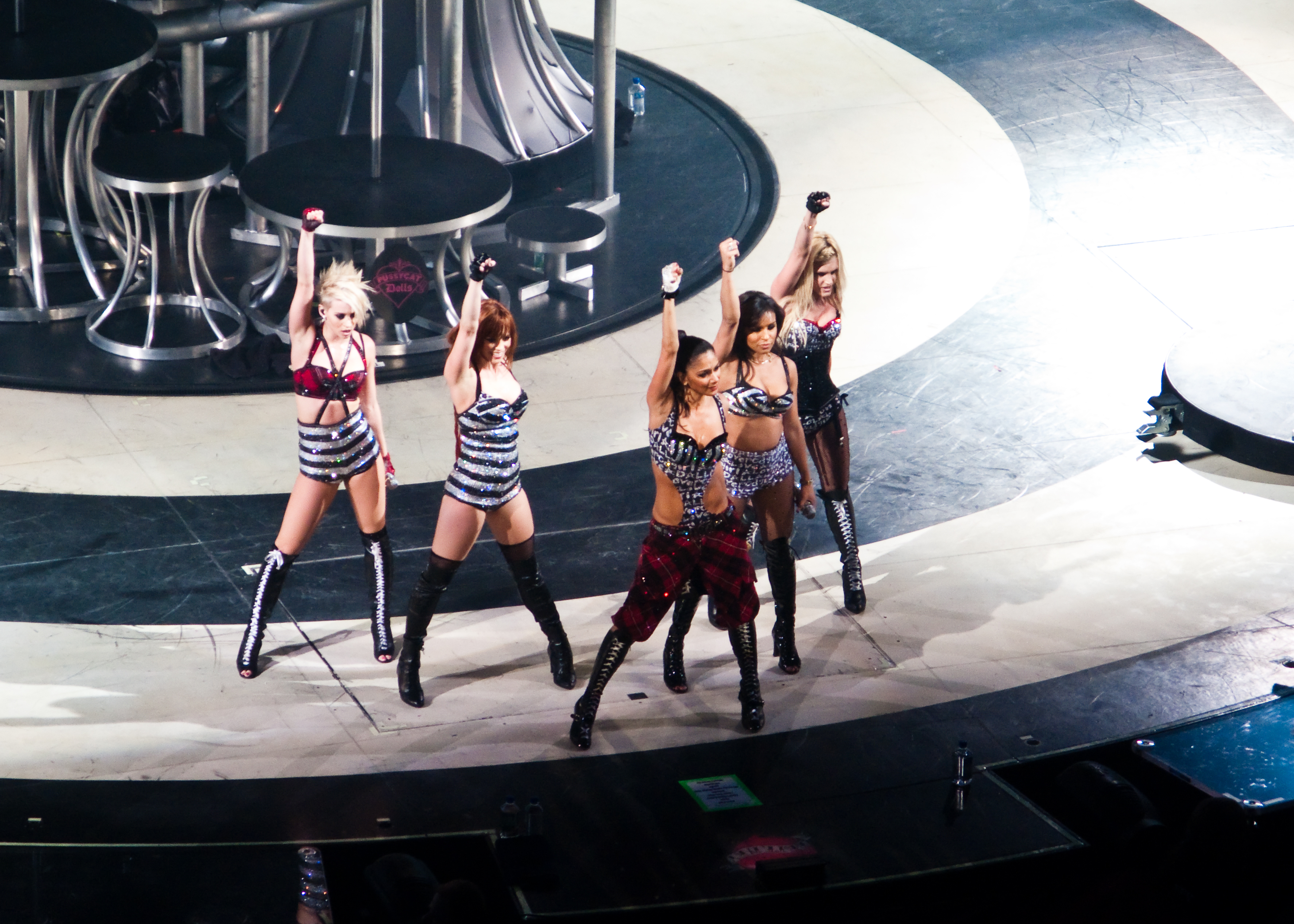
The Pussycat Dolls performing "Jai Ho! (You Are My Destiny)" on The Circus Starring Britney Spears

During the summer of 2008, Ashley Roberts first mentioned the group's intentions to tour in 2009. In October the group announced the first set of dates in the United Kingdom with American R&B singer-songwriter Ne-Yo as an opening act in select UK dates. The following month more European dates were announced along with dates in Oceania for which American recording artist Lady Gaga was announced as the main opening act in both legs. The first leg of Doll Domination Tour began at the Aberdeen Exhibition and Conference Centre in Aberdeen, Scotland on January 18, 2009, and concluded on February 25 at the Belgrade Arena in Belgrade, Serbia. Before continuing in Oceania, the group opened for Britney Spears' Circus Tour in North America from March 3 to May 3. The tour resumed on May 16 at the Vector Arena in Auckland, New Zealand and concluded on July 31 at the Beirut International Exhibition & Leisure Center in Beirut, Lebanon. Jessica Sutta suffered a back injury during the first Sydney show, leaving the group performing as a foursome throughout the following shows. Twenty-three shows were submitted to Billboard's boxscore grossing $14.3 million, with 231,711 fans attending the performances. During the tour, the group's dissatisfaction over Scherzinger's prominence led to a public outburst by Melody Thornton. While opening for The Circus Starring Britney Spears (2009) in Glendale, Arizona, Melody Thornton addressed the crowd during their break saying, "[...] let me give a shout-out to my family. Thank you for supporting me, even if I'm not featured" referring to the billing of the song, and encouraging the audience to follow their dreams and to "never let anyone stomp on them, ever." Less than a year later, the group formally disbanded following an initial hiatus.

== Track listing ==
Doll Domination
No.	Title	Writer(s)	Producer(s)	Length
1.	"When I Grow Up"	Rodney "Darkchild" Jerkins; Theron Thomas; Timothy Thomas; Jim McCarty; Paul Samwell-Smith	Darkchild	4:05
2.	"Bottle Pop" (featuring Snoop Dogg)	Sean "The Pen" Garrett; Fernando Garibay; Nicole Scherzinger	Garrett; Garibay; Clubba Lang^{[a]}	3:30
3.	"Whatcha Think About That" (featuring Missy Elliott)	Jamal Jones; Esther Dean; Missy Elliott; Mickael Furnon	Polow da Don; Ron Fair^{[b]}; Dean^{[b]}	3:48
4.	"I Hate This Part"	Wayne Hector; Lucas; Jonas Jeberg; Mich Hansen	Jeberg; Cutfather; Fair	3:39
5.	"Takin' Over the World"	Jesse Woodard; Tiffany Gouche; Davion Faris; Danniel Farris; Myles Sims; Emmanuell Chisolm; Daniel Groover	Chase N. Cashe	3:35
6.	"Out of This Club" (featuring R. Kelly and Polow da Don)	Kelly; Jones	Kelly	4:08
7.	"Who's Gonna Love You"	Scherzinger; Jones; Kara DioGuardi	Polow da Don; Fair^{[b]}	4:00
8.	"Happily Never After"	Shaffer Smith; Shea Taylor	Taylor; Ne-Yo^{[a]}	4:49
9.	"Magic"	Timothy Mosley; Jerome "Jroc" Harmon; Ezekiel Lewis; Balewa Muhammad; Patrick "J. Que" Smith; Candice Nelson	Timbaland; Harmon	3:41
10.	"Halo"	Mosley; Harmon; Lewis; Muhammad; Smith; Nelson	Timbaland; Harmon	5:24
11.	"In Person"	Mosley; Harmon; Lewis; Muhammad; Smith; Nelson	Timbaland; Harmon	3:36
12.	"Elevator"	Jerkins; Crystal Johnson	Darkchild; LaShawn Daniels^{[b]}; Jordan Omley^{[b]}	3:41
13.	"Hush Hush"	Andreas Romdhane; Josef Larossi; Ina Wroldsen; Scherzinger	Quiz & Larossi; Fair	3:48
14.	"Love the Way You Love Me"	Chauncey Hollis; Woodard; DioGuardi; Kasia Livingston	Hit-Boy; Chase N Cashe; DioGuardi^{[a]}	3:21
15.	"Whatchamacallit"	Mosley; Harmon; Lewis; Muhammad; Smith; Nelson	Timbaland; Harmon	4:19
16.	"I'm Done"	Stefanie Ridel; Tommy Lee James; Ashlyne Huff	Fair; Tal Herzberg^{[a]}	3:18
Total length:				62:40

International edition
No.	Title	Writer(s)	Producer(s)	Length
17.	"Baby Love" (Nicole Scherzinger featuring will.i.am)	William Adams; DioGuardi; Scherzinger; Keith Harris	will.i.am	3:58
18.	"Perhaps, Perhaps, Perhaps"	Osvaldo Farrés; Joe Davis	Fair	2:15

Australian and UK editions
No.	Title	Writer(s)	Producer(s)	Length
17.	"Lights, Camera, Action" (featuring New Kids on the Block)	Jamal Jones; Brian Kennedy; Cornell Haynes; Lloyd Politte	Polow da Don; Nelly^{[b]}; Adam Messinger^{[b]}	3:45
18.	"Perhaps, Perhaps, Perhaps"	Farrés; Davis	Fair	2:15

International reissue (Note: attributed to Argentine, Brazilian, European, Indonesian, and South Korean pressings)
No.	Title	Writer(s)	Producer(s)	Length
13.	"Hush Hush; Hush Hush"	Andreas Romdhane; Josef Larossi; Ina Wroldsen; Scherzinger; Freddie Perren; Dino Fekaris	Fair; Dave Audé; Quiz & Larossi; Scherzinger^{[a]}	4:13
17.	"Jai Ho! (You Are My Destiny)" (RF Mix) (with A. R. Rahman featuring Nicole Scherzinger)	Scherzinger; Dean; Fair; Evan Bogart; Erika Nuri; David Quiñones; Nailah Thorbourne; Nyanda Thorbourne; Candace Thorbourne	Rahman; Fair^{[c]}; Scherzinger^{[b]}	3:42
18.	"Top of the World"	Calvin Kenon; Quiñones; Bogart; Nuri	Calvo Da Gr8; The Writing Camp^{[a]}	3:14
19.	"Painted Windows"	Jerkins; Nwaneri; Harper; Johnson	Jerkins; Nwaneri; Harper^{[a]}; Johnson^{[a]}	3:34
Total length:				73:10

Deluxe edition bonus disc
No.	Title	Writer(s)	Producer(s)	Length
1.	"If I Was a Man" (Jessica Sutta solo)	Ridel; Miriam Nervo; Olivia Nervo; Michael Smith	Smidi; Fair; Ridel	3:31
2.	"Space" (Melody Thornton solo)	Andrew Frampton; Jack Kugell; Jamie Jones; Jason Pennock	Kugell; Jamie Jones; Pennock; Mischke^{[b]}	3:08
3.	"Don't Wanna Fall in Love" (Kimberly Wyatt solo)	Jane Child	David Frank; Mischke	3:21
4.	"Played" (Ashley Roberts solo)	Steve Diamond; Robbie Nevil	Nevil; Mischke	3:20
5.	"Until U Love U" (Nicole Scherzinger solo)	Diane Warren	Peter Stengaard; Fair	3:38
Total length:				16:58

=== Notes ===
- ^{^a} signifies a co-producer
- ^{^b} signifies a vocal producer
- ^{^c} signifies an additional producer
- Japanese edition pressings include "Lights, Camera, Action", J. R. Rotem remix of "Baby Love", and "Perhaps, Perhaps, Perhaps".
- Deluxe edition pressings include initial bonus tracks at the end of the second disc, depending on region.
- Initial Austrian, German and Swiss reissue pressings include the "We Love to Entertain You"-inspired version of "Takin' Over the World".
- Australian Doll Domination 2.0 pressings include tracks 1, 2, 4, 5, 10, and 16, alongside the four international reissue bonus tracks.
- UK Doll Domination 3.0 pressings include international reissue tracks 13, 17, and 19, alongside "Perhaps, Perhaps, Perhaps".
- In 2019, "Out of This Club" was removed from digital stores and streaming services, in the aftermath of sexual abuse allegations against R. Kelly. All subsequent physical pressings of Doll Domination also exclude the track.

Sample credits

- "When I Grow Up" contains elements of "He's Always There" by the Yardbirds.
- "Whatcha Think About That" contains samples from "Je M'appelle Jane" by Jane Birkin.

== Personnel ==
Credits adapted from the liner notes of Doll Domination.

=== Performance credits ===
- Nicole Scherzinger – all lead vocals, background vocals
- Melody Thornton – additional lead vocals, background vocals
- Jessica Sutta – additional background vocals
- Ashley Roberts – additional vocals
- Kimberly Wyatt – additional vocals
- Snoop Dogg – vocals (track 2)
- Missy Elliott – vocals (track 3)
- R. Kelly – vocals (track 6)
- Polow Da Don – vocals (track 6), additional vocals (track 7)
- New Kids on the Block – vocals (track 6)
- Rodney "Darkchild" Jerkins – additional vocals (track 1)
- Rock City – additional vocals (track 1)
- Candice Nelson – additional background vocals (tracks 9–11, 15)
- Pino Palladino – bass guitar
- Greg Phillinganes – keyboards, additional background vocals
- Steve Jordan – drums
- Captain Kirk Douglas – guitar

=== Technical and production ===
- Julian Peploe – art direction
- Matthew Rolston – photography
- Rodney "Darkchild" Jerkins – production (tracks 1, 12), vocal production, mixing (track 1)
- Paul Foley – recording (track 1)
- Mike "Handz" Donaldson – recording (track 1)
- Roberto "Tito" Vazquez – recording (track 1)
- Spike Stent – mixing (track 1)
- Sean "The Pen Garrett – production, instrumentation, programming (track 2)
- Fernando Garibay – production, instrumentation, programming (track 2)
- Clubba Langg – co-production (track 2)
- Miles Walker – recording (track 2)
- Chris Jackson – recording (track 2)
- Mike Hogue – assistant recording (track 2)
- Chris Kasych – assistant recording (track 2)
- Brian Schunck – assistant recording (track 2)
- Matt Wheeler – assistant recording (track 2), recording (tracks 3, 5, 14)
- Kennard Garrett – keyboards (track 2)
- Raymond "Rayza" Oglesby – keyboards, additional drum programming (track 2)
- Tony Maserati – mixing (track 2)
- Jamal "Polow Da Don" Jones – production (tracks 3, 7, 17)
- Ron Fair – production (tracks 4, 13, 16), vocal production (tracks 3, 4, 7, 13), string arrangement and conduct (tracks 3, 7, 13, 16), vocal arrangement (track 7) wind chimes (track 16)
- Ester Dean – vocal production (track 3)
- Mike "Angry" Eleopoulos – recording (tracks 3, 4, 13, 16)
- Tal Herzberg – recording (tracks 3, 4, 13), Pro Tools (tracks 3, 4, 13, 16) co-production (track 16)
- Tony Terrebonne – recording (track 3)
- Aubry "Big Juice" Delaine – recording (track 3)
- Tony Terrebonne – recording (track 3)
- Johnathan Merritt – assistant recording (tracks 3, 4)
- Bryan Morton – assistant recording (track 3)
- Jason Perry – keyboards (track 3)
- Melvin Jones – trumpet (track 3)
- Lissy Rosemond – banjo (track 3)
- Eric Florence – tuba (track 3)
- Dave Pensado – mixing (tracks 3–5, 12–14)
- Jaycen Joshua – mixing (tracks 3–5, 12–14)
- Andrew Wuepper – mixing assistant (tracks 3, 13)
- Jonas Jeberg – production, recording, instruments, programming (track 4)
- Peter Mokran – mixing (tracks 4, 7)
- Eric Weaver – mixing assistant (tracks 4, 7)
- Chase N Cashe – production (tracks 5, 14)
- Daniel Groover – guitars (track 5)
- R. Kelly – production, arrangement, mixing assistant (track 6)
- Ian Mereness – recording, programming (track 6)
- Abel Garibaldi – recording (track 6)
- Jeff Meeks – recording, programming (track 6)
- Eric Schlotzer – recording, programming (track 6)
- Donnie Lyle – guitars (track 6)
- Patrick Hayes – guitars (track 6)
- Eric Schlotzer – recording, programming (track 6)
- Donnie Lyle – guitars (track 6)
- Patrick Hayes – guitars (track 6)
- Steve Baughman – recording (track 7)
- Tony Terrebone – recording (track 7)
- Nicole Scherzinger – vocal arrangement (track 7)
- Shea Taylor – production (track 8)
- Shaffer "Ne-Yo" Smith – co-production (track 8)
- Mike Tocci – recording (track 8)
- Daniel Laporte – additional recording (track 8)
- Moses "Big Mo" Laporte – additional recording (track 8)
- Robert "R.T." Taylor – acoustic guitar (track 8)
- Bart Bucsko – electric guitar (track 8)
- Glenn Kamp – drums (track 8)
- Kevin "KD" Davis – mixing (track 8)
- Timbaland – production (tracks 9–11, 14)
- Jerome "Jroc" Harmon – production (tracks 9–11, 14)
- Chris Godbey – recording, mixing (tracks 9–11, 14)
- Julian Vasquez – recording (tracks 9–11, 14)
- Fareed Salamah – recording (tracks 9–11, 14)
- Ron Taylor – additional pro-tools editing (tracks 9–11, 14)
- Dan Warner – additional guitars (tracks 10, 11)
- Lashawn Daniels – vocal production (track 12)
- Jordan Omley – vocal production (track 12)
- Tito Vasquez – recording (track 12)
- Mike "Handz" Donaldson – recording (track 12)
- Paul Foley – recording (track 12)
- Quiz & Larossi – production, instruments, programming (track 13)
- Frank Wolf – strings recording (track 13)
- Jonathan Merrit – assistant engineers (tracks 13, 16)
- Keith Gretlein – assistant engineers (track 13)
- Greg De Pante – assistant engineers (track 13)
- Hit-Boy – productions (track 14)
- Kara Dioguardi – co-production (track 14)
- Allen Sides – string recording (track 16)
- Ryan Shanahan – assistant engineers (track 16)
- Mike Houge – assistant engineers (track 16)
- Gary Grin – piano (track 16)
- Gary Novak – piano (track 16)
- John Goux – guitar (track 16)
- Rusty Anderson – guitar (track 16)
- Jack Joseph Puig – mixing (track 16)
- Dean Nelson – mixing assistant (track 16)
- Nelly – vocal production (track 17)
- Adam Messinger – vocal production (track 17)

== Charts ==
=== Weekly charts ===
2008–2009 weekly chart performance
Chart	Peak position
Australian Albums (ARIA)	4
Australian Urban Albums (ARIA)	1
Austrian Albums (Ö3 Austria)	16
Belgian Albums (Ultratop Flanders)	17
Belgian Albums (Ultratop Wallonia)	22
Canadian Albums (Billboard)	3
Croatian Albums (HDU)	39
Czech Albums (ČNS IFPI)	23
Dutch Albums (Album Top 100)	24
European Top 100 Albums (Billboard)	8
Finnish Albums (Suomen virallinen lista)	38
French Albums (SNEP)	16
German Albums (Offizielle Top 100)	10
Greek International Albums (IFPI)	4
Irish Albums (IRMA)	6
Italian Albums (FIMI)	57
Japanese Albums (Oricon)	16
Mexican Albums (Top 100 Mexico)	55
New Zealand Albums (RMNZ)	8
Polish Albums (ZPAV)	32
Portuguese Albums (AFP)	25
Scottish Albums (Official Charts)	5
Spanish Albums (Promusicae)	38
Swiss Albums (Schweizer Hitparade)	7
Taiwanese Albums (Five Music)	2
UK Albums (Official Charts)	4
UK R&B Albums (Official Charts)	3
US Billboard 200	4

2009 weekly chart performance for Doll Domination 2.0
Chart	Peak position
Australian Albums (ARIA)	8
Australian Urban Albums (ARIA)	2

=== Year-end charts ===
2008 year-end chart performance
Chart	Position
Australian Albums (ARIA)	53
Australian Urban Albums (ARIA)	7
European Top 100 Albums (Billboard)	97
French Albums (SNEP)	118
Greek International Albums (IFPI)	40
Swiss Albums (Schweizer Hitparade)	96
UK Albums (OCC)	103

2009 year-end chart performance
Chart	Position
Belgian Albums (Ultratop Wallonia)	89
French Albums (SNEP)	65
UK Albums (OCC)	173
US Billboard 200	186

2009 year-end chart performance for Doll Domination 2.0
Chart	Position
Australian Albums (ARIA)	60
Australian Urban Albums (ARIA)	6

== Certifications ==
Certifications and sales
Region	Certification	Certified units/sales
Australia (ARIA) Doll Domination 2.0	Platinum	70,000^{^}
Belgium (BRMA)	Gold	15,000^{*}
Canada (Music Canada)	Platinum	80,000^{^}
France (SNEP)	Gold	75,000^{*}
Germany (BVMI)	Gold	100,000^{^}
Ireland (IRMA)	Platinum	15,000^{^}
New Zealand (RMNZ)	Platinum	15,000^{‡}
Russia (NFPF)	Platinum	20,000^{*}
Singapore (RIAS)	Gold	5,000^{*}
Switzerland (IFPI Switzerland)	Gold	15,000^{^}
United Kingdom (BPI)	Platinum	300,000^{‡}
United States	—	400,000
Summaries
GCC (IFPI Middle East)	Gold	3,000^{*}
^{*} Sales figures based on certification alone.^{^} Shipments figures based on certification alone.^{‡} Sales+streaming figures based on certification alone.

== Release history ==
Release dates and formats
Region	Date	Edition(s)	Format(s)	Label(s)	Ref.
Germany	September 19, 2008	Standard; deluxe	CD; double CD; digital download	Universal	
Australia	September 22, 2008	Standard; deluxe	CD; double CD; digital download	Universal	
United Kingdom	September 22, 2008	Standard	CD; digital download	Polydor	
United States	September 23, 2008	Standard; deluxe	CD; double CD; digital download	Interscope	
France	September 28, 2008	Standard	CD	Polydor	
Japan	October 15, 2008	Standard	CD	Universal	
Japan	December 10, 2008	Deluxe	Double CD	Universal	
Germany	April 13, 2009	Reissue	Digital download	Universal	
France	April 14, 2009	Reissue	CD	Polydor	
Taiwan	April 17, 2009	Reissue	CD	Universal	
Australia	April 24, 2009	2.0	CD; digital download	Universal	
Germany	April 24, 2009	Reissue	CD	Universal	
United Kingdom	August 3, 2009	3.0	CD; digital download	Polydor	
Various	April 5, 2019	Revised	CD; digital download; streaming	Interscope	
Various	May 8, 2026	Revised	Vinyl	Interscope; UM^{e}	
