= Whatcha Think About That =

2008 single by The Pussycat Dolls

Single by The Pussycat Dolls featuring Missy Elliott

from the album Doll Domination
- Released: August 29, 2008
- Studio: Boiler Room (Santa Monica); Zac (Atlanta)
- Genre: Electropop; R&B
- Length: 3:30
- Label: Interscope
- Songwriters: Jamal Jones; Ester Dean; Melissa Elliott; Mickaël Furnon
- Producer: Polow da Don

The Pussycat Dolls singles chronology
"When I Grow Up" (2008)	"Whatcha Think About That" (2008)	"I Hate This Part" (2008)

Missy Elliott singles chronology
"Bad Girl" (2008)	"Whatcha Think About That" (2008)	"Let's Just Do It" (2009)

Music video
- "Whatcha Think About That" on YouTube

"Whatcha Think About That" is a song recorded by American girl group the Pussycat Dolls for their second studio album, Doll Domination (2008). The song features a guest appearance from American rapper Missy Elliott, who co-wrote it with the song's producer Polow da Don, Ester Dean, and Mickaël Furnon. It was released on August 29, 2008, as the album's second single in the United States, and on February 23, 2009, as the third single in the United Kingdom. The electropop and R&B midtempo song samples "Je m'appelle Jane" by Jane Birkin and is built on a bhangra-inspired guitar riff. Lyrically, the Pussycat Dolls reverse roles towards an overbearing and controlling partner. Elliott references American singer Katy Perry and her song "I Kissed a Girl".

The song received moderate reviews from music critics; some praised the production and Elliott's contribution, while others had the opposite opinion. It did not enter the US Billboard Hot 100 but peaked at number eight on the US Bubbling Under Hot 100 chart. The song peaked at number 12 on the Irish Singles Chart and number nine on the UK singles chart, where it received a silver certification from the British Phonographic Industry (BPI). An accompanying music video was directed by Diane Martel and was released on October 6, 2008. It depicts the group performing Fosse-inspired choreography in a burlesque lounge. The Pussycat Dolls performed the song for a few televised appearances and on their 2009 Doll Domination Tour.

== Background and release ==
"Whatcha Think About That" was written by its sole producer Polow da Don, Ester Dean, Missy Elliott, and Mickaël Furnon of the French rock group Mickey 3D. It features a sample of "Je m'appelle Jane", written by Furnon and performed by Jane Birkin. Dean handled the vocal production as well, along with Ron Fair. The artist's vocals were recorded at Zac Studio in Atlanta, Georgia and The Boiler Room Studio in Santa Monica, California by Mike “Angry” Eleoploulos, Tal Herzberg, Tony Terrebonne, Aubry "Big Juice" Delaine, and Matt Wheeler, with the assistance of Johnathan Merritt and Bryan Morton. The song was mixed by Dave Pensado and Jayson Joshua. Elliott appears courtesy of The Goldmind Inc. and Atlantic Records. She is the first female rapper the Pussycat Dolls collaborated with, after previously working with male rappers such as Busta Rhymes and Snoop Dogg. According to lead singer, Nicole Scherzinger, Elliott's contribution to the song elevated the group to another level, acknowledging they always wanted to work with her. Fellow group member, Kimberly Wyatt has frequently stated Elliott is a dream collaboration of hers.

The song premiered through the Pussycat Dolls' website for streaming on August 29, 2008. Rap-Up unveiled the cover art, confirming that "Whatcha Think About That" was selected to be released as the follow-up to their single "When I Grow Up". The song impacted US contemporary hit radio stations on September 9, 2008, as the second single in the United States from Doll Domination, and a remixes version was made available for digital download in the country on October 21, 2008. In the United Kingdom, the song was released as a CD single on February 23, 2009, after "I Hate This Part", standing as the third single to coincide with the group's Doll Domination Tour run within the UK.

== Composition and lyrics ==
Musically, "Whatcha Think About That" is an electropop and R&B midtempo song, with elements of dance music and a sample of Birkin's "Je m'appelle Jane". Built around a bhangra-inspired guitar riff, the group adopts a "spunky attitude" and lay "down the law to a deadbeat boyfriend" who is overbearing and controlling. They partake in a gender-role reversal approach and propose different activities, such as the protagonist going out in a club, while her boyfriend stays home. A reviewer from Newsday noted the group sound "sleek and empowered", and where compared to M.I.A.'s vocals, resembling a near-tribal sound. Maura Johnston of Idolator wrote that the song is reminiscent of Whitney Houston's single "I'm Your Baby Tonight" (1990). "Whatcha Think About That" features three verses from Elliott, who joins the Pussycat Dolls "for a boy-baiting session", and uses risqué lyrics in her "brash" rap teasing, "You ain't gonna get no more pussy... cat". Elliott references singer Katy Perry and her song "I Kissed a Girl" (2008) during one of the verses with the line, "Up in that club it's just me and my girls, play like Katy Perry kissing on girls."

== Reception ==
=== Critical ===
Alex Fletcher from Digital Spy called "Whatcha Think About That" a "vibrant slice" of a song that finds the group "somewhere near the top of their game". Vancouver Province's Stuart Derdeyn wrote that "Whatcha Think About That" "is a far better tune" than "When I Grow Up" for its "all kinds of innuendo". The Sunday Times reviewer Elan Priya considered the former an exception to how Doll Domination "lacks any distinct personality" and highlighted Elliot's rap as "cheeky". Allison Stewart of The Washington Post wondered if it is the least objectionable song the Pussycat Dolls has recorded and described the track as a "nifty tale of sexual role reversal". BBC's Vicki Lutas attributed the song's catchiness to Elliott, adding that "she does make this song just that little bit more distinctive". Slant Magazine critic Sal Cinquemani labelled "Whatcha Think About That" as "pure filler" despite the presence of Elliott. Nic Oliver of musicOMH equated Elliott's contribution to someone who is sleepwalking, adding that the lyrics were written by a "sophomore student on a weekend bender". A reviewer from Entertainment.ie commented that Elliott lowers herself "to new levels of cheese" with her contribution. Nick Levine of Digital Spy wrote the song "is slightly disappointing after the hyperactive pop brilliance of 'When I Grow Up'". Johnston of Idolator criticized Scherzinger for "whining and preening", and Elliot for her weak contribution in the song.

=== Commercial ===
"Whatcha Think About That" did not enter the US Billboard Hot 100, though it peaked at number eight on the US Bubbling Under Hot 100 chart, for the week ending September 28, 2008. That same week, the song debuted and peaked at number 66 on the Canadian Hot 100 chart. In Europe, the track peaked at number 12 on the Irish Singles Chart on the week ending February 12, 2009, three weeks since its debut. In the UK, "Whatcha Think About That" debuted at number 36 on the UK Singles Chart, while their previous single "I Hate This Part" dropped out of the top-40. On its fifth week, the song peaked at number nine, giving Elliott her first top-10 entry since 2005 with "Lose Control". In October 2018, the song was certified silver by the British Phonographic Industry (BPI) for track-equivalent sales of 200,000 units in the UK. The Official Charts Company (OCC) ranks "Whatcha Think About That" as the Pussycat Dolls' ninth most successful song on the singles chart.

== Promotion ==
A scene of the music video, showing the Pussycat Dolls perform onstage against a backdrop of "burlesque house lighting".

The music video for "Whatcha Think About That" was directed by Diane Martel over the time span of two days, ending on September 10, 2008. The two-day shoot was exhausting for the group as they kept on dancing until the early morning and in return some of the members, like Wyatt, began to blister in their feet. Wyatt elaborated, "It can get kind of crazy, but when we’re tired as hell, we turn to each other for support, or maybe just a laugh." On September 15, 2008, the Pussycat Dolls released a sneak peek of the music video through AOL Music. The music video was released on October 6, 2008.

The music video is an ode to the group's burlesque origins, where they would frequently perform at Johnny Depp's Viper Room. During an interview with Rap-Up, member Melody Thornton described the choreography as Fosse-inspired and stylized. Throughout the video the group, wear different cabaret-inspired costumes, fishnets, along with black or white corsets. Scenes also feature the Pussycat Dolls on "dominatrix-style [...] swing[s]". According to a writer from Rap-Up, "the Pussycat Dolls turn up the heat in their smoldering [music video]".

The Pussycat Dolls and Elliott gave their first performance of "Whatcha Think About That" on October 28, 2008, on Dancing with the Stars. A writer for Rap-Up commented that the performers "sounded a mess". A week later, they performed the song on The Ellen DeGeneres Show. The following year, the group performed the song during their headlining Doll Domination Tour.

== Track listing and versions ==
- Digital download – Remixes
1. "Whatcha Think About That" (Urban Club Remix) featuring Missy Elliott – 3:48
2. "Whatcha Think About That" (Ron Fizzle Remix) – 3:33
- Digital download – Remixes EP
1. "Whatcha Think About That" featuring Missy Elliott – 3:48
2. "Whatcha Think About That" (Ron Fizzle Remix) – 3:32
3. "Whatcha Think About That" (Music video) – 3:48
- UK 3 mobile Exclusive
1. "Whatcha Think About That" (Wideboys Club Mix) featuring Missy Elliott – 6:26
- UK Orange Exclusive
1. "Whatcha Think About That" (Urban Club Mix) featuring Missy Elliott – 3:49
- UK T-Mobile Exclusive
1. "Whatcha Think About That" (Hybrid Remix) featuring Missy Elliott – 3:49
- UK Vodafone Exclusive
1. "Whatcha Think About That" (Dave Pensado Remix) featuring Missy Elliott – 3:33

== Credits and personnel ==
Credits adapted from the liner notes of Doll Domination.

Recording

- Recorded at Zac Studio (Atlanta, Georgia); The Boiler Room (Santa Monica, California)

Personnel

- Ester Dean – songwriter, vocal producer
- Aubry "Big Juice" Delaine – recording
- Mike "Angry" Eleopoulos – recording
- Missy Elliott – songwriter, background vocals
- Ron Fair – vocal producer, string arrangement and conduct
- Eric Florence – tuba
- Mickaël Furnon – songwriter
- Tal Herzberg – recording, Pro Tools
- Jamal Jones – songwriter, producer
- Jaycen Joshua – mixing
- Johnathan Merritt – assistant recording
- Bryan Morton – assistant recording
- Dave Pensado – mixing
- Jason Perry – keyboards
- Lissy Rosemond – banjo
- Tony Terrebonne – recording
- Matt Wheeler – recording
- Andrew Wuepper – mixing

== Charts ==
=== Weekly charts ===
Weekly peak performance for "Whatcha Think About That"
Chart (2008–09)	Peak position
Canada Hot 100 (Billboard)	66
Ireland (IRMA)	12
Mexico Airplay (Billboard)	43
Scottish Singles Sales (Official Charts)	3
Slovakia Airplay (ČNS IFPI)	64
UK Singles (Official Charts)	9
UK Hip Hop/R&B (Official Charts)	3
US Bubbling Under Hot 100 (Billboard)	8
US Pop 100 (Billboard)	70

=== Year-end charts ===
Year-end chart performance for "Whatcha Think About That"
Chart (2009)	Position
UK Singles (OCC)	104

== Certifications ==
Certifications and sales for "Whatcha Think About That"
Region	Certification	Certified units/sales
United Kingdom (BPI)	Silver	200,000^{‡}
^{‡} Sales+streaming figures based on certification alone.

== Release history ==
Release dates and formats for "Whatcha Think About That"
Region	Date	Format(s)	Version(s)	Label(s)	Ref.
Various	August 29, 2008	Streaming	Original	Interscope	
United States	September 9, 2008	Contemporary hit radio	Original	Interscope	
United States	September 9, 2008	Digital download	Original	Interscope	
United States	October 21, 2008	Digital download	Remixes	Interscope	
United Kingdom	February 23, 2009	CD	Original	Polydor	
