= Woman Up =

Woman Up may refer to:

- "Woman Up", a song by Ashley Roberts from her 2014 album Butterfly Effect
- "Woman Up", a song by Meghan Trainor from her 2016 album Thank You
