= Ashley Roberts =

British-American singer (born 1981)

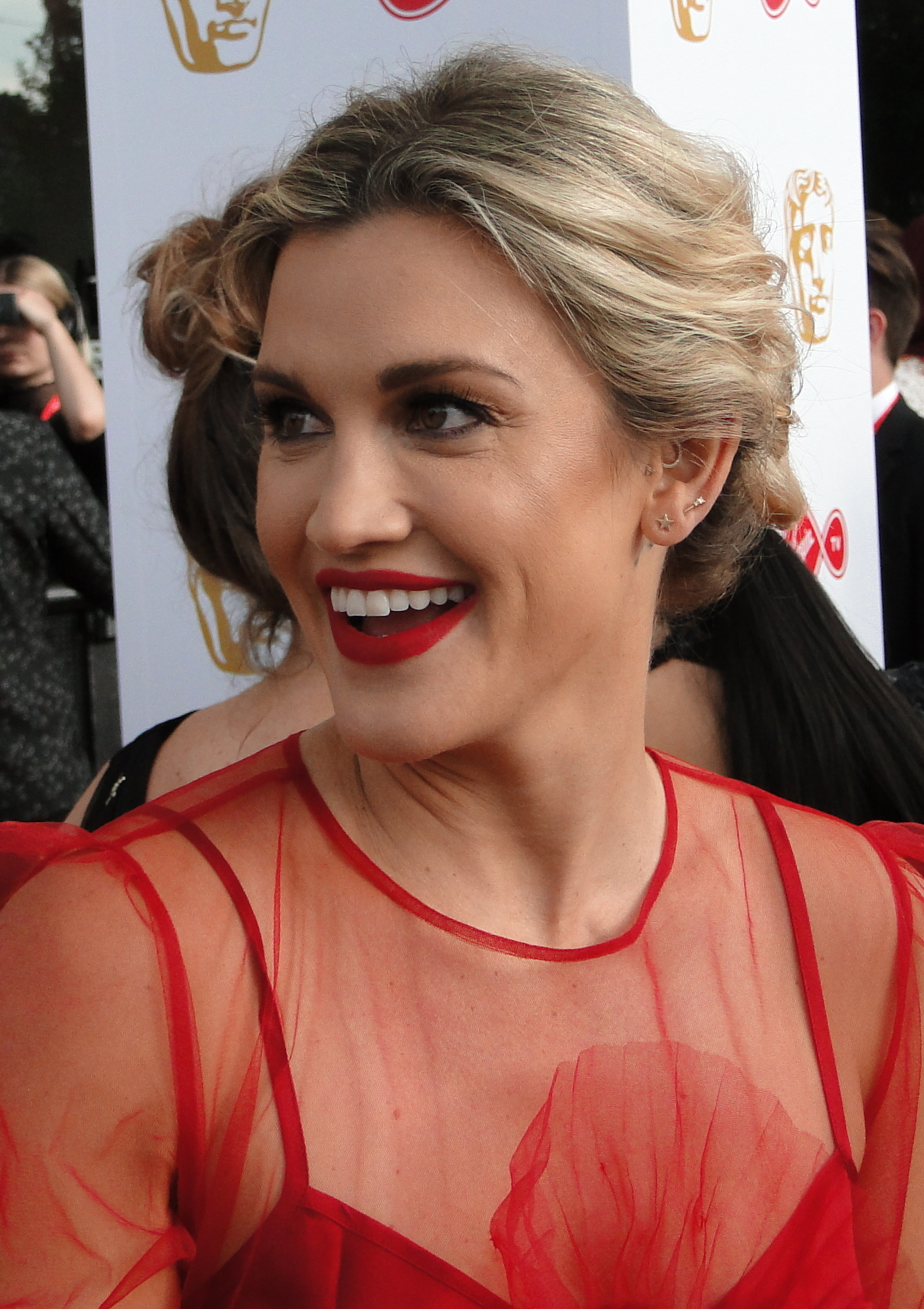
- Roberts in 2018

Background information
- Born: Ashley Allyn Roberts; September 14, 1981 (age 45); Phoenix, Arizona, U.S.
- Genres: Pop; R&B
- Occupations: television presenter; singer; dancer; actress
- Instrument: Vocals
- Years active: 2001–present
- Labels: Metropolis; Cherry Red
- Member of: The Pussycat Dolls

Ashley Allyn Roberts (born September 14, 1981) is an American television presenter, singer, dancer and actress. She is a member of the R&B and pop group the Pussycat Dolls. With two albums and over 55 million records sold worldwide, the Pussycat Dolls are one of the world's best-selling female groups of all time. Roberts also had a brief career as a solo singer with the album Butterfly Effect (2014).

Roberts has appeared as a contestant on reality television shows, including I'm a Celebrity...Get Me Out of Here! (2012), The Jump (2015), Strictly Come Dancing (2018), and I'm a Celebrity... South Africa (2026). As a television presenter, she hosted Ant & Dec's Saturday Night Takeaway (2013–2016), 1st Look (2016–2018), The Real Dirty Dancing UK (2021), and Dance Monsters (2022).

In 2019, Roberts made her West End debut as Dawn in the musical Waitress, and became the showbiz correspondent for the national Heart Breakfast radio show. Since 2022, she has been a presenter for Heart 00s, part of the Heart radio network.

== Early life ==
Ashley Roberts was born on September 14, 1981, and raised in Phoenix, Arizona. She is the daughter of Pat Roberts, a former drummer of the Mamas & the Papas, and Peggy Lorraine, a Pilates instructor. They split when she was 14. She has a younger brother, Jayce who at 16, was diagnosed with a severe mental illness after years of misdiagnosis. A DNA test revealed the family is of English, Irish, Swedish, and Spanish ancestry. She began studying styles such as contemporary, hip-hop, and jazz at an early age, which inspired her to pursue a career in the entertainment industry.

== Career ==
=== 2001–2009: The Pussycat Dolls ===
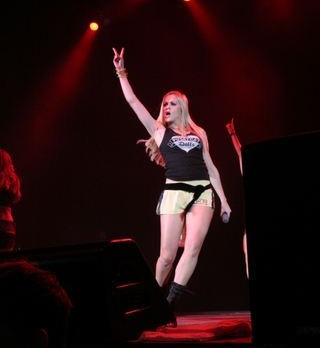
Roberts in December 2006

In 2001, Roberts relocated to Los Angeles, where she worked as a professional dancer in music videos for artists such as Aaron Carter, Josh Groban, and Counting Crows.

Through a friend, Roberts learned about the Pussycat Dolls, a modern burlesque dance ensemble founded in 1995 by choreographer Robin Antin. The troupe performed regularly at The Viper Room during that time. Roberts successfully auditioned and began performing with the group in 2002. The following year, Antin, struck a deal with Interscope Geffen A&M Records' Jimmy Iovine to develop the group into a brand and create a separate pop girl group. It ultimately consisted of six members: Carmit Bachar, Roberts, Nicole Scherzinger, Jessica Sutta, Melody Thornton, and Kimberly Wyatt who signed a contract with the Pussycat Dolls partnership, receiving a percentage of the group's revenues. Though it was later revealed that the members are actually salaried employees of the label. In April 2005, they released their first single, "Don't Cha" (featuring Busta Rhymes), which stands as the group's most successful single to date peaking at number two on the Billboard Hot 100 chart and reaching the top in 15 other countries. They released their self-titled debut album in September 2005. Subsequent singles "Stickwitu" and "Buttons" also reached the top five on the Billboard Hot 100 chart, with the former earning Roberts a Grammy Award nomination for Best Pop Performance by a Duo or Group with Vocals. The album went on to sell seven million copies worldwide (Note: Worldwide sales figures for PCD as of August 2008.) and established the group as viable in the music industry earning them a reputation among the century's few breakout successes.

Roberts played a supporting role in the dance film Make It Happen (2008), which starred Mary Elizabeth Winstead and Tessa Thompson. It was released in the UK on August 8, 2008, and went direct-to-video in the US on December 9, grossing $10.15 million at the box office. The group's second and final studio album Doll Domination was released in September 2008 and attained their highest position on the Billboard 200 (number four). The album is considered a commercial disappointment selling less than 400,000 copies in the US which propelled the label to reissue the album with new songs. (Note: US sales figures for Doll Domination as of April 2009.) The album and its reissues spawned three top-twenty singles: "When I Grow Up", "I Hate This Part", and "Jai Ho! (You Are My Destiny)". The latter sparked controversy and media attention as it credited Scherzinger as a featured artist, leading to internal friction within the group. The album was additionally promoted with their second headlining concert tour, Doll Domination Tour which grossed over $14 million. (Note: The gross takings from the 23 shows which were reported to Billboard Boxscore totalled $14.3 million.) The group would then confirm a hiatus towards the end of the year.

=== 2010–2018: Breakthrough on British television ===
In February 2010, Roberts announced her departure from the group in pursuit of acting and solo music. Her first solo release, a beat-driven cover of "Theme from A Summer Place," was released in September through B-Sharp Records and Saguaro Road Rhythm (SRR), part of Saguaro Road Records.

In 2012, Roberts signed to Cherry Red Records and released her debut single, "Yesterday" in November. The release coincided with her participation in the twelfth series of the British reality show I'm a Celebrity...Get Me Out of Here!, finishing as the runner-up. Although initially hesitant to participate, Roberts’ appearance on the show elevated her profile in the UK, establishing her as one of the breakout stars of that series and leading to subsequent television and commercial opportunities. The following year Roberts signed up as judge on the eighth series of Dancing on Ice and became a presenter on Ant & Dec's Saturday Night Takeaway, regularly appearing throughout the show to help judge the Ant vs Dec challenges and various other competitions. Furthermore, she made regular appearances on This Morning and became the face the online boutique, KEY Fashion.

In early 2014, Roberts continued her role as a judge on ninth and final series of Dancing on Ice. Later she released her first fragrance Ashley by Ashley Roberts, and launched a Spring/Summer 2014 collection for KEY Fashion. In May, she released her debut album's lead single, "Clockwork", a power ballad with "soaring strings, pounding drums and ethereal chant." It failed to enter the top 100 in the UK Singles Chart. A second single, "Woman Up", followed in August. The album titled, Butterfly Effect, was released on the following month. Nick Duerden of The Independent described it as a "airy and catchy" pop album, incorporating themes of female empowerment reminiscent to Katy Perry’s musical style. Released to little fanfare, it failed to reach the top 100 of the UK Albums Chart. She participated in Ant & Dec's Takeaway on Tour, hosting the Ant vs. Dec segment for a total of 34 shows between August 6 and September 13. The following year she was a contestant in The Jump where she was eliminated in the second week.

Roberts took over the hosting of the travel and lifestyle program 1st Look starting on January 9, 2016, on NBC owned-and-operated stations nationwide. She hosted the show until 2018, and was nominated for Outstanding Travel and Adventure Program at the 45th Daytime Emmy Awards. Named after her middle name, Roberts launched Allyn, a women's footwear brand for spring 2017. In September 2018, she was paired with professional partner, Pasha Kovalev for series 16 of Strictly Come Dancing. Her casting attracted criticism from viewers who felt her professional dance experience was unfair to the other contestants. Despite the controversy, Roberts would end up being the show's highest scored contestant and was announced as one of the runner-ups of the series.

=== 2019–present: Professional expansion ===
Roberts performing on the PCD Forever Tour in September 2026

In June 2019, Roberts made her West End debut, starring as Dawn, in the musical, Waitress. Her Strictly participation reignited her passion for live performances and was encouraged by the casting director, who was a fan of her appearances, to audition for the role. Roberts was drawn to the production's humor, progressive story, and music. Sandra Howell of London Theatre Direct complimented Roberts for capturing the character's anxious, awkward charm though noted her solo song was seen as vocally demanding, with stronger moments in ensemble pieces. That same month, she became the showbiz correspondent of the national Heart Breakfast radio show, hosted by Jamie Theakston and Amanda Holden.

On the finale of The X Factor: Celebrity, Roberts joined the Pussycat Dolls reunion, performing a live medley of their previous singles and their new song "React." British media regulator Ofcom received over 400 complaints from viewers who criticized the band's perceived provocative nature of their performance. "React" was released in February 2020 to moderate success. Their reunion tour, a 45-date run originally scheduled for April 2020, was postponed multiple times due to the COVID-19 pandemic and was ultimately cancelled in January 2022 amid a legal dispute between Scherzinger and Antin over the terms of the group's business arrangements. That same year she participated in the second series of Celebrity Gogglebox.

She subsequently hosted the British version of The Real Dirty Dancing (2021), a celebrity dance competition inspired by the film, presented Netflix's Dance Monsters (2022), a disguised dance contest, and Heart Radio's Heart 00s weekly show, a 2000s music station. In 2025, inspired by her Bali retreat and breathwork training, Roberts released her book, Breathwork: Techniques for better mental, emotional and physical health. The guide shares 10 techniques to tackle anxiety, burnout, and sleep issues.

In 2026, Roberts returned for the all-star South African edition of I'm a Celebrity...Get Me Out of Here!. Then she reunited with Scherzinger and Wyatt for a Pussycat Dolls reunion; they released comeback single "Club Song" in March, and embarked on the PCD Forever Tour in June. She will portray one of the members of the band Girlfriends alongside fellow performers from other girl groups in the film, Girl Group.

== Filmography ==
=== Television ===
Year	Title	Role	Notes	Ref.
2007	DanceLife	Guest judge	Episode: "Waiting on Love"	
2010	Dance Your Ass Off	Guest judge	Episode: "Temptation city"	
2012	90210	Penny	Episode: "Into the Wild"	
2012	I'm a Celebrity...Get Me Out of Here!	Contestant	Series 12	
2013–2014	Dancing on Ice	Judge	Series 8–9	
2013–2016	Ant & Dec's Saturday Night Takeaway	Presenter	Series 10–13	
2013–2022	Celebrity Juice	Panellist	14 episodes	
2014	WWE Legends’ House	Presenter	10 episodes	
2015	The Jump	Contestant	Series 2	
2015–2016	The Keith Lemon Sketch Show	Presenter / Various characters	Season 4	
2016–2017	1st Look	Presenter	Also producer	
2017	Let It Shine	Guest Judge	1 episode	
2018	Strictly Come Dancing	Contestant	Series 16	
2020	Celebrity Gogglebox	Painelist	Series 2	
2022	The Real Dirty Dancing	Presenter		
2022	Dance Monsters	Presenter		
2026	RuPaul's Drag Race: UK vs. the World	Guest judge	Series 3	
2026	I'm a Celebrity... South Africa	Contestant	Series 2	

=== Film ===
Year	Title	Role	Notes	Ref.
2005	Be Cool	Herself		
2008	Make It Happen	Brooke		
2015	Keith Lemon's Back T'Future	Lorraine	Television film	
2017	Who Shot Simon Cowell?	Party girl	Television film	
2026	Girl Group	TBA		

== Radio ==
Year	Title	Roles	Radio
2019–present	Heart Breakfast	Correspondent	Heart
2022–present	Heart 00s	Presenter	Heart

== Discography ==
=== Studio albums ===
List of albums, with selected chart positions and certifications
Title	Album details	Peak chart positions	
Title	Album details	UK	UK Indie
Butterfly Effect	Released: September 1, 2014; Label: Metropolis; Format: CD, digital download	159	36

=== Singles ===
List of singles, with selected chart positions and certifications
Title	Year	Peak chart positions			Album
Title	Year	UK	UK Indie	SCO	Album
"Yesterday"	2012	—	—	—	Non-album single
"Clockwork"	2014	175	18	88	Butterfly Effect
"Woman Up"	2014	—	—	—	Butterfly Effect
"—" denotes releases that did not chart or were not released in that territory.

=== Promotional singles ===
Title	Year	Album
"A Summer Place"	2010	Non-album single

=== Album appearances ===
List of album appearances, showing album name and year released
Title	Year	Other artists	Album(s)	Ref.
"Played" (Note: Each member was credited to a solo track on the European double-disc deluxe version of the album.)	2008	The Pussycat Dolls	Doll Domination	

=== Music videos ===
Title	Year	Other artist(s)	Director(s)	Ref.
As a lead artist
"Yesterday"	2012	—N/a	Don Tyler	
"Clockwork"	2014	—N/a	Ramy Dance	
"Woman Up"	2014	—N/a	Ramy Dance	
Guest appearances
"Trouble"	2003	Pink	Sophie Muller	
"Stars in Your Eyes"	2010	Her Majesty & the Wolves	Justin Harder	
"Goodbye"	2015	Bobby Newberry; Melody Thornton	Noel Maitland	

== Stage credits ==
Title	Year	Role	Notes	Ref.
Ant & Dec's Takeaway on Tour	2014	Host	"Ant vs. Dec" segment	
Waitress	2019	Dawn	West End debut, Adelphi Theatre	

== Awards and nominations ==
Year	Award	Work	Category	Result	Ref.
2007	Grammy Awards	"Stickwitu"	Best Pop Performance by a Duo or Group with Vocals	Nominated	
2014	Popjustice Readers' Poll	Roberts	Worst Attempt at Launching a Solo Career	10th place	
2018	Daytime Emmy Awards	1st Look	Outstanding Travel and Adventure Program (Note: as a producer.)	Nominated	

== Notes ==
Preceded by Audrina Patridge	1st Look host 2016–2018	Succeeded by Johnny Devenanzio
