= Butterfly Effect (Ashley Roberts album) =

Studio album by Ashley Roberts
- Released: September 1, 2014
- Recorded: 2013–June 2014
- Genre: Pop; R&B
- Length: 34:06
- Label: Metropolis London
- Producer: Red Triangle; The Elev3n; Charlie Holmes; The Invaders; Dan Vinci; Holter/Erixson; Frankmusik; Luke Armitage

Singles from Butterfly Effect
- 1. "Clockwork" Released: May 25, 2014; 2. "Woman Up" Released: August 25, 2014

Butterfly Effect is the debut solo studio album by American singer Ashley Roberts. It was released through Metropolis London on September 1, 2014. There are two singles released from the album: "Clockwork", on May 25, and "Woman Up" on August 25. It was produced by eight producers including Frankmusik.

== Background ==
In 2003, Roberts joined girl group The Pussycat Dolls. They released many hits through the years, like: "Don't Cha", "Buttons", "When I Grow Up" and "I Hate This Part". Seven years later, in 2010, the group broke up and Roberts released her debut single "A Summer Place".

In 2012, she released two singles: promotional song "Yesterday" in November, and a song for digital download for debut album, entitled "All in a Day". In late 2013, Roberts met eight new producers for her debut album. One of the producers was Red Triangle. The album was finished in June 2014 and there were ten songs that Roberts chose for the album. There are two singles from the album: "Clockwork" which released on May 25, 2014, and "Woman Up" which released August 25, 2014.

== Track listing ==
No.	Title	Writer(s)	Producer(s)	Length
1.	"Clockwork"	Rick Parkhouse, George Tizzard, John Newman, Jetta	Red Triangle	3:33
2.	"Woman Up"	Dave Rodrigues, James Morales, Matt Morales, Erika Nuri, Shane Stevens, Nash Overstreet	The Elev3n	3:17
3.	"Lonely Nights (Hey You)"	Ashley Roberts, Charlie Holmes, Norma Jean Martine	Charlie Holmes	4:15
4.	"All in a Day"	Bobby Newberry, Stanley Adams, Maria Graver, Steven Miller, Scott Jones	The Invaders	3:13
5.	"Ride or Die"	Ashley Roberts, Charlie Holmes, Dan Vinci, Paul Lewis, Nina Potiszil, Andrew Black	Dan Vinci	3:57
6.	"My Song"	Ashley Roberts, Oscar Holter, Jakob Erixson, Luke Armitage, J-Son	Holter & Erixson, Luke Armitage	3:19
7.	"Midas Touch"	Ashley Roberts, Frankmusik	Frankmusik	3:09
8.	"Wild Heart"	Ashley Roberts, Frankmusik	Frankmusik	3:35
9.	"Standing in the Rain"	Ashley Roberts, Frankmusik	Frankmusik	3:34
10.	"Face of Love"	Saul Ashby	Luke Armitage	3:35

Deluxe edition bonus tracks
No.	Title	Writer(s)	Producer(s)	Length
11.	"Clockwork (Cahill Edit)"	Parkhouse, Tizzard, Newman, Jetta	Cahill	3:45
12.	"Woman Up (Digital Dog Edit)"	Rodrigues, Morales, Morales, Stevens, Nuri, Overstreet	Digital Dog	3:06
13.	"My Song (Comets We Fall Remix)"	Roberts, Holter, Erixsen, Armitage, J-Son		4:15
14.	"Clockwork" (music video)			3:35
15.	"Woman Up" (music video)			3:21
16.	"Track by Track Interview"			7:37
17.	"Digital Booklet - Butterfly Effect"

== Chart performance ==
Chart (2014)	Peak position
UK Albums (OCC)	159
UK Independent Albums Chart	36

== Release history ==
Country	Date	Format	Label
Worldwide	August 29, 2014	Digital download	Metropolis London Music Limited
Worldwide	September 1, 2014	CD, download	Metropolis London Music Limited
