= Dreamboys =

Male revue brand with touring theatre shows and nightclub residencies

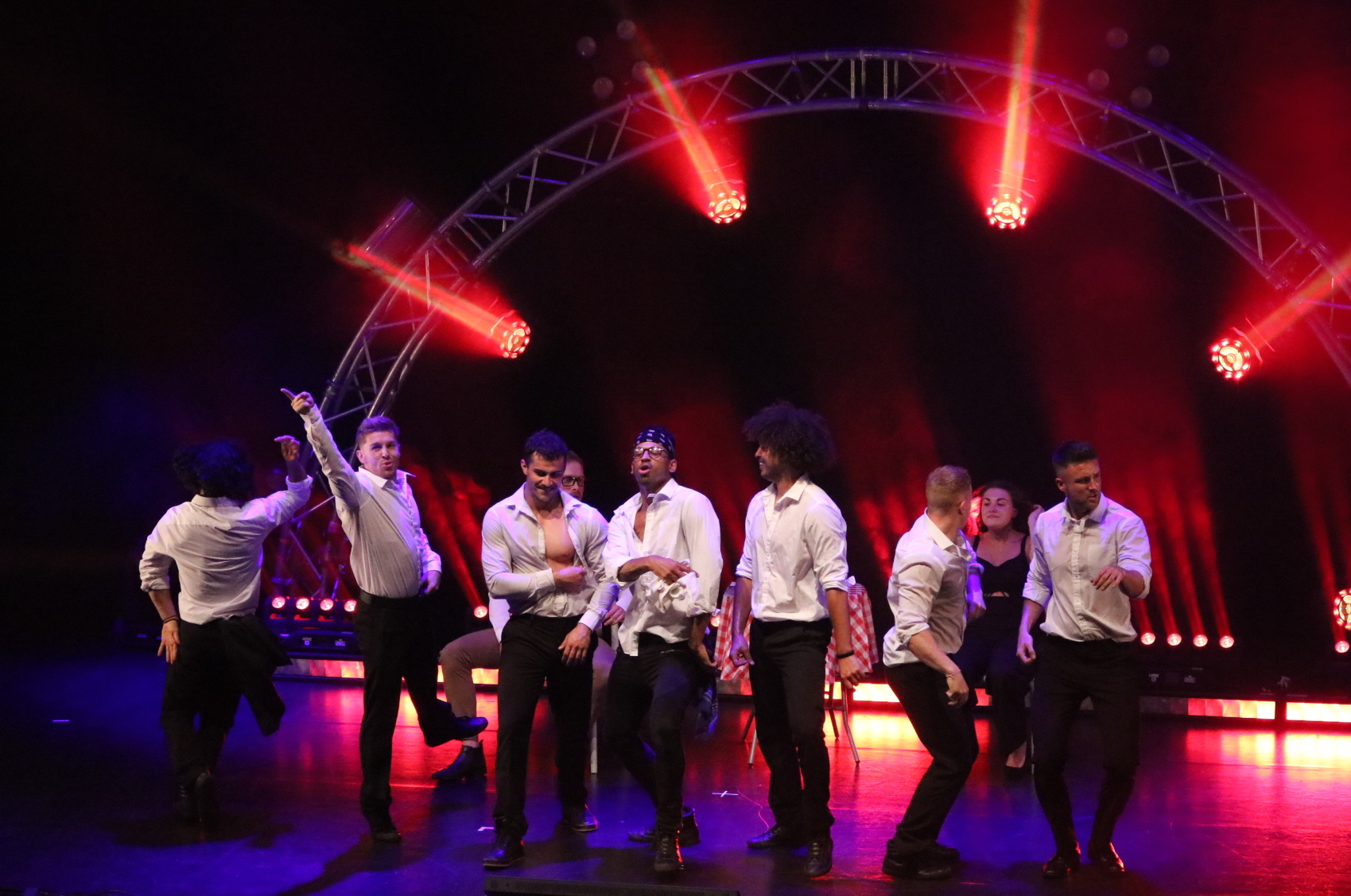
- The Dreamboys on Tour in 2019
- Formation: 1988
- Type: Theatre group
- Purpose: Erotic
- Location: United Kingdom
- Website: www.dreamboys.co.uk

The Dreamboys are a male revue brand with touring theatre shows and nightclub residencies. It was first created by Bari Bacco who no longer is associated to the present company. The Dreamboys are known for their male striptease performances and for their dancers' distinctive toned physiques. The brand currently perform over 600 shows per annum, with over 100 different performers and approximately 250,000 guests in attendance.

== Overview ==
Established in 1987 by Bari Bacco, Dreamboys were the first all-male stripping troupe in the UK. Bacco did not allow the Dreamboys to go fully nude in shows due to restrictions imposed by Westminster City Council. "The G-String is the dividing line between Obscenity and Eroticism. Its all what you don't see; not what you do see? Pictures in the mind that keeps the viewer coming back for more".

The Dreamboys first launched at the Peter Stringfellows venue, the London Hippodrome, to an audience of 2000 women. After the success of the show, the Dreamboys took up permanent residency at Jaquelines nightclub in Wardour St Soho London. Many celebrities visited the show in Soho including Cleo Rocos, Bananarama. The popularity of the Dreamboys followed through to hundreds of performances on television with major stars - Elton, Cliff, Dame Edna, Pamela Anderson, Amy Winehouse and TV charity shows 'Children in Need'. Soon after, major tours around the world were booked including Russia, Dubai, Germany, Malta, Denmark, Sweden, Cyprus, Turkey, and Greece. Billionaire Philip Green booked the Dreamboys for his 50th Birthday Party in Cyprus. The Dreamboys dressed in Roman Togas performed for the guests along with Rod Stewart, Tom Jones, Demis Roussos, George Benson, and Earth, Wind & Fire. The Grand Order of Lady Water Ratlings booked the Dreamboys to perform at the Grosvenor House Hotel on Londons Park Lane, for a host of celebrity stars. The evening was compered by Barbra Windsor who introduced the boys performance by saying "Who needs any American Strippers, when we have our own fabulous Dreamboys!". The pinnacle of their showbiz career was a presentation to PRINCESS DIANA and dance sequences with the SPICEGIRLS in the film 'SPICEWORLD'.

As of 2011, Bari Bacco is no longer associated with the Dreamboys.

Each year, the group releases an annual calendar featuring the current Dreamboys.

== Touring show ==
The Dreamboys produce a touring theatre show and have performed in the UK and internationally. The troupe tour the UK with a theatre show combining high-energy dance routines with male striptease and audience participation. As of 2017 the lead dancer and choreographer has been Jordan Darrell, a former backing dancer for Rita Ora. Various items of merchandise are produced in association with the touring show, including clothing, homewares, theatre programs and calendars.

In 2015 the management of Dreamboys commented that the depiction of male strip shows in Magic Mike XXL was a "public liability claim waiting to happen".

In 2018, the Dreamboys pushed the Guild Hall in Preston into administration, in order to secure funds owed to them by the venue.

== Nightclub residencies ==
The Dreamboys also perform in resident nightclubs across the UK. In 2018, Dreamboys was involved in a lawsuit over cancelled hen party bookings in Cardiff which they claim “tarnished” their reputation.

== Notable performers, dancers and hosts ==
- Gaz Beadle, reality television personality known for appearing in the MTV reality series Geordie Shore & Ex on the Beach.
- Scotty T, reality television personality known for appearing in the MTV reality series Geordie Shore & Celebrity Big Brother.
- Rogan O'Connor, reality television personality known for appearing on MTV's Ex on the Beach.
- Jake Quickenden, English singer, reality television personality and contestant on The X Factor in 2012 and 2014, I'm a Celebrity...Get Me Out of Here! and Dancing on Ice.
- Dan Osborne, former cast member of The Only Way Is Essex.
- Zac Smith, contestant on The Bridge, British version of El Puente.
- Michael Griffiths, reality television personality known for appearing on Love Island and MTV's Ex on the Beach.
- Jordan Darrell, choreographer and judge on The Real Dirty Dancing.

== In popular culture ==
- In 1991, the Dreamboys were invited to play gods in a scene with the British Youth Opera and Ballet at Whitehall Palace for a charity gala in celebration of Princess Diana's birthday. Princess Diana met the boys after the show and is reported to have said "You aren't wearing very much tonight." One of the boys replied "You should see us in our show".
- In 1997, the Dreamboys featured in Spice World, a 1997 British musical comedy film starring pop girl group the Spice Girls who all play themselves.
- In 1988 The Sun newspaper ran a double-page spread featuring a line-up of The Dreamboys. It was headlined "Who's got the best bot in Britain?" and called on readers to phone in with their preferences.
- In 2003 the British model Nell McAndrew launched the new Daily Play lottery game from Camelot with the help of The Dreamboys.
- In 2013 the Dreamboys were featured in an hour-long documentary special on Channel 4 titled "Confessions of a Male Stripper".
- In 2020 the Dreamboys were part of a week-long documentary series on Channel 5 (British TV channel) titled "Adults Only" exploring the lives of those with adult professions.
