= React (The Pussycat Dolls song) =

Single by the Pussycat Dolls
- Released: February 7, 2020
- Recorded: 2019
- Studio: Westlake (Hollywood, LA); 360 Mastering (Hastings, UK)
- Genre: Electropop; synth-pop
- Length: 3:24
- Label: Access
- Songwriters: Nicole Scherzinger; Georgia Buchanan; Johan Gustafsson; Will Simms; Hannah Wilson
- Producers: Will Simms; Johan Gustafson; Ivares

The Pussycat Dolls singles chronology
"Hush Hush; Hush Hush" (2009)	"React" (2020)	"Club Song" (2026)

Music videos
- "React" on YouTube; "React" (Cash Cash remix) on YouTube; "React" (acoustic) on YouTube

"React" is a song recorded by American girl group the Pussycat Dolls and was released by Access Records on February 7, 2020. It is the group's first song in over a decade, the last being 2009's "Hush Hush; Hush Hush", and is their first independent release since partnering with First Access Entertainment. "React" sees the return of Carmit Bachar who left the group before the release of their last album, Doll Domination (2008), although it does not feature Melody Thornton, who opted out of the reunion citing the desire to continue with her own solo music career. It was written by group member Nicole Scherzinger, along with Georgia Buchanan, Johan Gustafsson, William Simister, and Hannah Wilson. It was produced by Gustafson, Will Simms, and Swedish producer Ivares.

A pulsating electropop and synth-pop song, "React" is about a stagnant and turbulent relationship with lyrics that speak of wanting a more powerful reaction and excitement from one's lover. The group debuted "React" during a medley performance of their previous singles on The X Factor: Celebrity on November 30, 2019, and shortly after confirmed a concert tour for 2020 which was then pushed back due to the COVID-19 pandemic. The song was subsequently performed on Ant and Dec's Saturday Night Takeaway and G-A-Y as part of National Student Pride as well as being performed at other TV appearances in the UK and Australia. The X Factor performance generated in excess of 400 complaints with British broadcast regulator Ofcom regarding a perceived raunchy nature of the performance. The group subsequently answered complaints by noting that they were entertainers and their intention was to always be fierce, whilst empowering women to own their bodies.

"React" received praise for its uptempo production, drawing comparisons to the group's 2006 singles "Beep" and "Wait a Minute". An official music video was released on February 7, 2020, and features pyrotechnics and water, as well as a dance routine involving chairs, inspired by the 1983 film Flashdance. Critics called the release a successful return to music, further praising the video's synchronized choreography and backdrop of fire and water. Commercially, the song reached number two in Scotland, number nine in Hungary and Serbia, number ten in Israel, the top twenty on a number of international digital charts, as well as number 29 in the UK; becoming the group's eleventh top-forty single in the UK. Scherzinger noted that "React" could be followed by further new music from the group depending its success and their (then upcoming) concert tour. A remix of "React" produced by Cash Cash and an acoustic music video were also released in promotion of the song. Just over a year after the song's release, "React" was certified silver by the British Phonographic Industry (BPI), denoting 200,000 units shipped in the UK. In 2022, the group would cancel their tour due to COVID-19 and call time on their reunion citing contract disputes between Scherzinger and Antin.

== Background ==
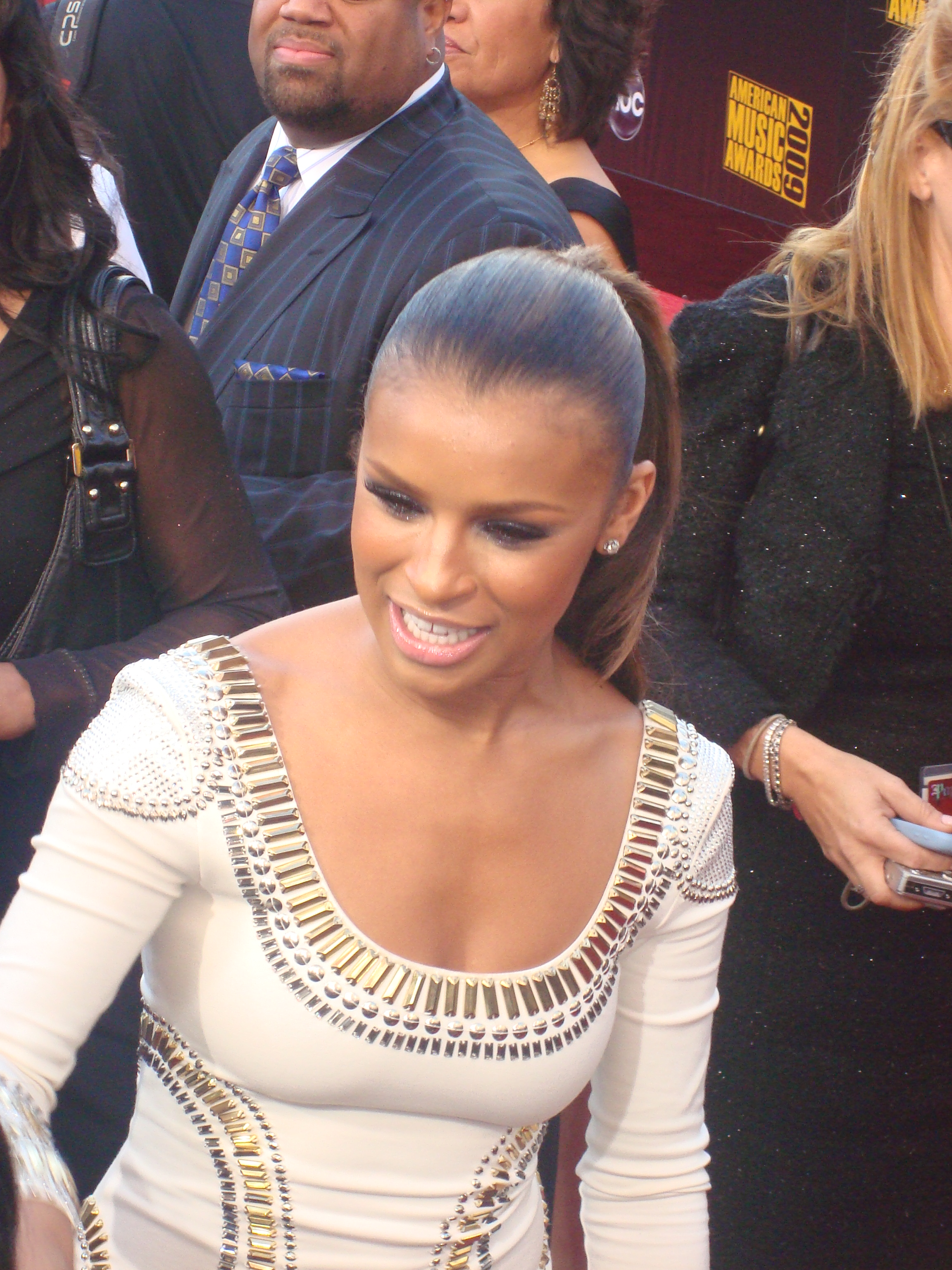
Former member Melody Thornton opted out of the reunion to focus on her solo career.

Following the re-release of Doll Domination (2008) and the group's single 2009 "Jai Ho! (You Are My Destiny)", tensions in the group rose due to Scherzinger being billed as a featured artist on the release. This would go on to lead to a public outburst by member Melody Thornton during the group's Doll Domination Tour. The group would then announce a hiatus, with group founder Robin Antin acknowledging that new members would be joining Scherzinger. By February 2010, Jessica Sutta, Ashley Roberts, Kimberly Wyatt and Thornton had announced their departures from the group, with Wyatt later acknowledging that "the group has fully disbanded." There was an attempt for new members to join Scherzinger in 2010, but by the end of 2010 Scherzinger too had left the group to pursue her solo career. Through 2017 and 2018, it was widely reported that the group were considering reforming.

In October 2017, social media sites were set up for the group, further fueling speculation of a reunion and tour. It would be almost 2 years before any further news emerged, when in September 2019, Entertainment Tonight reported that Scherzinger had joined members of the band for new studio sessions. UK The X Factor judge Louis Walsh confirmed that the Pussycat Dolls would be performing on the finale of The X Factor: Celebrity on November 30, 2019. The band then confirmed their reunion on British radio station Heart, confirming that Bachar, Roberts, Scherzinger, Sutta and Wyatt had been recording new music and have announced nine tour dates around the UK in 2020. During the interview Scherzinger remarked that it had been around 10 years since the group's last tour and that the time felt right, "it's been a long time coming, but this feels like the perfect time to remind the world what it means to be a Pussycat Doll." The group also confirmed that if the reception to "React" was positive there would be more music to come. The Tour was then pushed back into 2021 due to the COVID-19 pandemic.

It is the first time that new music from the group includes Carmit Bachar since her departure in early 2008, prior to the release of the group's last album Doll Domination (2008). According to group founder Antin, Thornton would not be taking part due to her feeling like the time was not right. The group stated that they are leaving the door open for Thornton and she would be welcome back if she decided to join them later down the line.

== Music and lyrics ==
"Coming back, we wanted to just do something that felt really new and fresh and something we'd never done. It's got that electro-pop feel and a great dance beat, so it's something we could dance hard to and do our own thing to, in regard to choreography."

— Scherzinger during an interview with Entertainment Weekly.

"React" is a pulsating electropop and synth-pop song, with a dance beat, written by group lead singer Nicole Scherzinger, as well as Georgia Buchanan, Johan Gustafsson, William Simister and Hannah Wilson. Gustafsson is part of Swedish record production outfit Trinity Music who have previously worked with Pussycat Doll member Sutta. Buchanan, also known as Call Me Loop, noted that "React" was the first song she wrote for another artist. Gustafson, Will Simms and Swedish producer Ivares are responsible for producing the song, which is set to a production of 120 beats per minute.

Scherzinger was working with Simms on new music and said that when she first heard "React" she was "excited to jump on it" because it was "really melodic, fresh, and current and new-sounding." "React" is themed around a turbulent relationship, where the lyrics "play with an overly nice man's emotions in the hopes of eliciting a more... powerful reaction". Lyrics include the phrases "Every time I leave, you pull me closer, I hang up the phone, you call me back. / Why don't you mess me 'round like you're supposed to? You're turning me cruel 'cause I'm just wanting you to react."

== Artwork ==
The artwork for "React" was first unveiled on the group's official Instagram account on January 27, 2020. It features the group facing the camera dressed all in black. Scherzinger's outfit included "long latex sleeves and was paired with loose-fitted pants". Roberts and Sutta were featured slightly side on with their arms on Scherzinger's shoulders. "Roberts' outfit was legless and sleeveless on opposite sides and also displayed her toned torso. Sutta rocked a leotard with cut-out tights on the side." Meanwhile, to the far left, Wyatt wore a "low-cut leotard with huge shoulder pads and fishnet tights underneath" while Bachar appears on the far right with "strapless corset bodysuit and skintight pants." An alternate version of the cover featuring a black background and white text was used for the Cash Cash remix of the song.

== Release ==
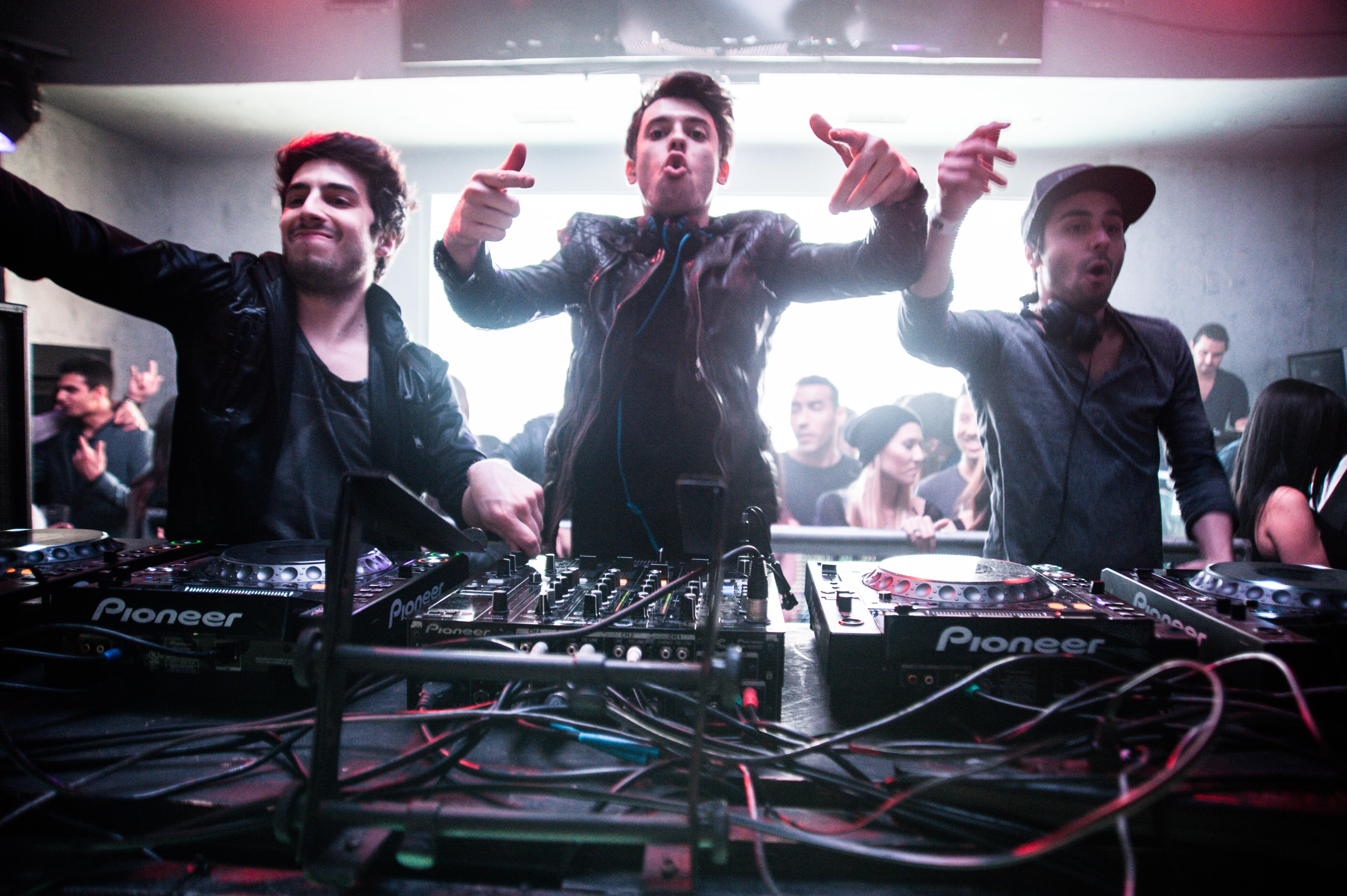
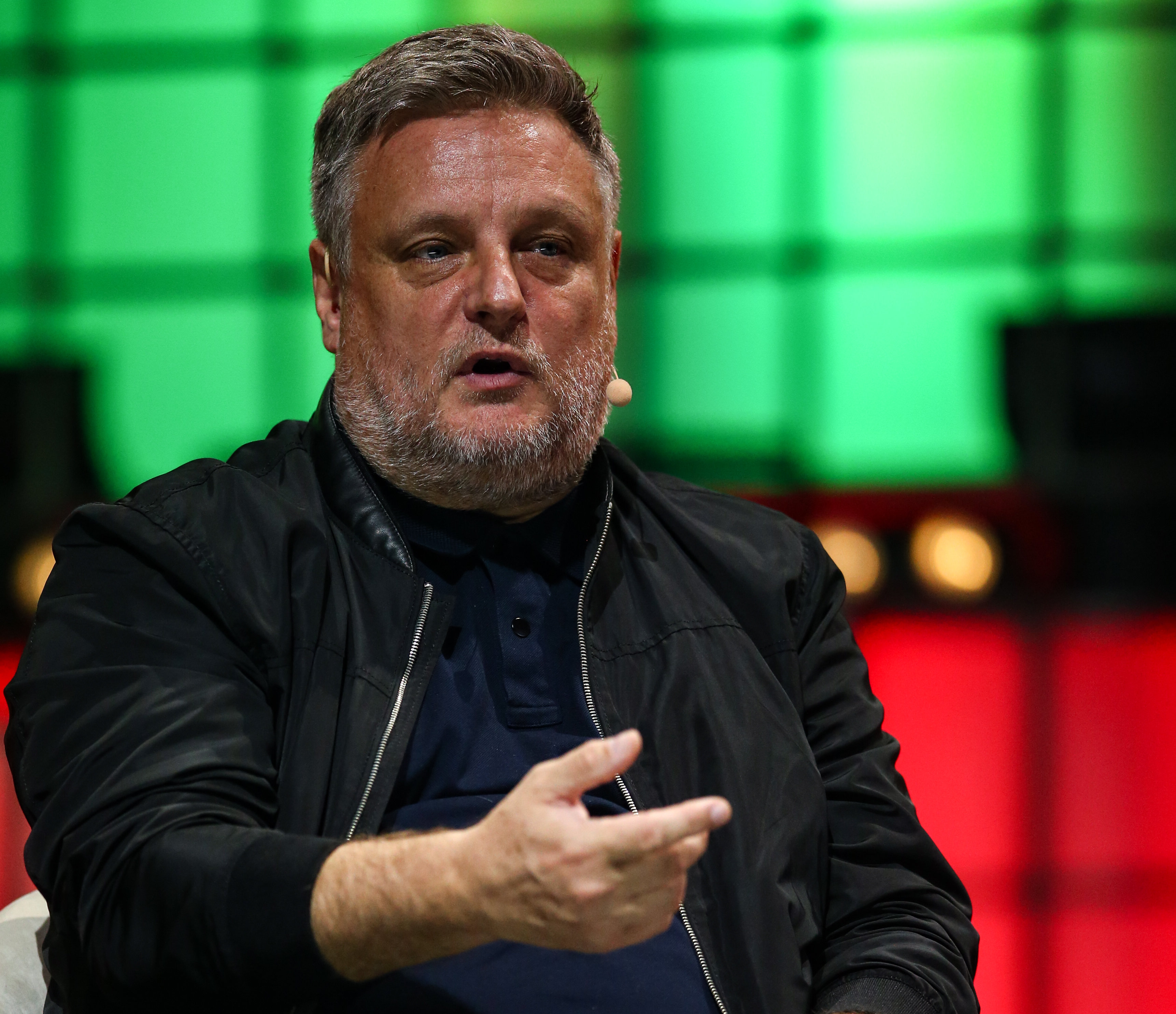
American electronic music trio Cash Cash (left) produced the official remix to "React", while Rankin directed an exclusive live acoustic performance.

In mid January 2020, an early unfinished version of the song leaked online featuring Scherzinger's vocals. The Official Charts Company's Robert Copsey commented that the release strategy was very reminiscent of the 2000–2009 decade as the song was not available to download or stream after the group's debut performance of the song and a rough demo of the song was leaked online. Copsey said "all are pretty much unheard of in 2020, but the nostalgia of it all somehow made it feel right." On January 27, 2020, it was confirmed that "React" would be released on February 7, 2020, and it was made available to pre-order for digital download and pre-save on streaming outlets. The release was confirmed on the group's Instagram account and included the cover art for the single too. The Official Charts Company confirmed the song was being released by Access Records, making it their first independent release and first release in over a decade. Scherzinger told Rap-Up that being "able to release our music independently at this moment in time feels incredibly empowering".

The group offered 20 fans the opportunity to learn the choreography for "React" at YouTube Space London, from choreographer Todrick Hall and get the opportunity to meet the group. Upon release of the song, the group celebrated the release with an exclusive photoshoot lensed by British fashion photographer Rankin, along with a featured spread in Hunger Magazine. Mushroom Records handled the release in Australia, which included the song being sent to radio stations for airplay. Scherzinger also released a TikTok video of her washing her hands to "React" on March 16, 2020, the feature covered by the Official Charts Company was part of a drive by celebrities to increase awareness of hygiene as part of tackling the COVID-19 pandemic. On April 3, 2020, the Cash Cash remix of "React" was released to digital outlets, and an exclusive acoustic performance was released by Hunger Magazine and Vero. On April 10, the group released a virtual breakdown video of the choreography for "React". Filmed during the COVID-19 pandemic, the video features members of the group taking it in turns to teach parts of the group choreography. Each of the girls filmed their part individually. According to Brazilian website POPline, the group had recorded a remix in partnership with Brabo Music and featuring Pabllo Vittar for their appearance at São Paulo's LGBTIQA+ parade in 2020. The parade and group's performance was cancelled due to the COVID-19 pandemic.

== Live performances ==
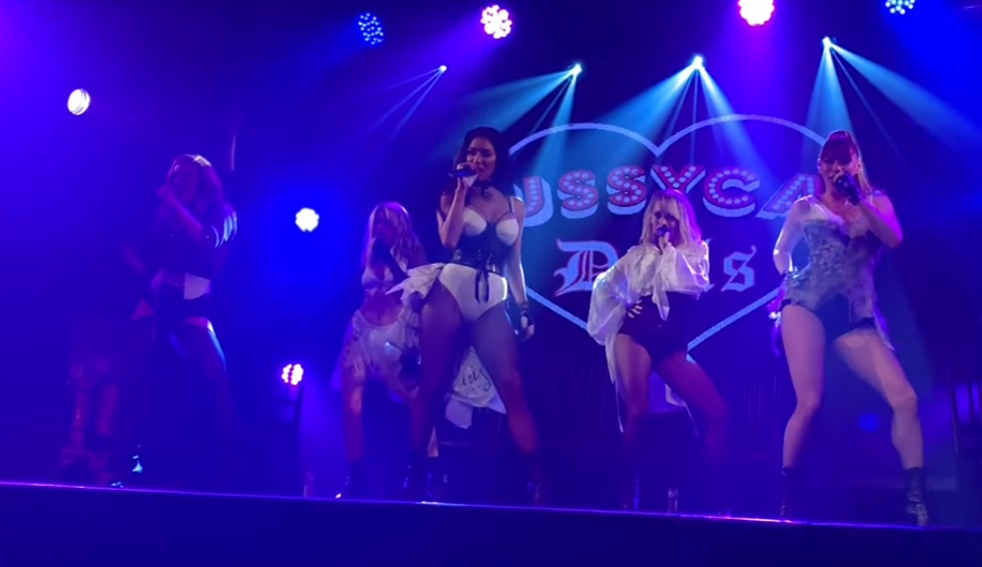
The Pussycat Dolls performing "React" live at G-A-Y for National Student Pride 2020

"React" was debuted as part of a live medley performance on The X Factor: Celebrity finale on November 30, 2019, where the group the song alongside previous singles including "Buttons", "When I Grow Up" and "Don't Cha". The performance featured fireworks and waterfalls from the ceiling. BuzzFeed's Matt Stopera said calling the performance "iconic was an understatement". These same elements would later be recreated during the song's official music video. The performance was also praised by Rose Dommu from Out who said the group "ate their performance" and noted that the performance was inspired by the film Flashdance (1983). E! also called the performance "epic", with Alyssa Morin saying that the group "made everyone's hearts flutter". Alongside the praise, 400 people complained to British media regulator Ofcom due to the "raunchy" nature of the performance and the group's decision to wear sheer PVC outfits on a family programme.

On February 22, 2020, the group performed "React" for the second time on British Television as part of a medley on series sixteen of Ant & Dec's Saturday Night Takeaway, along with "Buttons", "Beep" and "Don't Cha". The performance took the form of a comedy skit and was used to poke fun the controversy caused by their previous performance of "React". As part of the performance, a TV test card flashed up on screen from ITV reading "we're sorry for the disruption... we're working hard to fix the issue and will return to normal family-friendly, not at all sexy, uncontroversial programming soon." The test card was revealed to be a backdrop which the group jumped through. Later the same night, The Dolls performed "React" and their previous singles as part of their headlining set at G-A-Y for National Student Pride.

Later, during a performance on BBC 1's The One Show on February 26, the group experienced technical difficulties as "even though the track started playing and voices could be heard, the Dolls didn't move up on stage because it appeared that their earpieces weren't working." This led to some accusations from viewers that only Scherzinger was singing live, with Adam White writing for The Independent noting that during the technical issue, "some members of the group could be seen sharing concerned glances at one another, indicating that they could not hear the song". After being reintroduced to the audience, the song began to play at a louder volume. White remarked that it was noticeable how Scherzinger was "singing over the top of a separate pre-recorded track," however on the second go, "the group's performance went off without another hitch". The One Show since confirmed that the technical errors were the fault of the BBC and that the Pussycat Dolls were signing live over a backing track but could not hear the track due to an error on the production team's behalf.

On March 5, 2020, the group performed "React" as part of a medley of singles for Nova FM 96.9's Red Room at Glass Island Sydney Harbour, Australia. They also appeared live on the Sunrise breakfast TV show to perform. The group also performed together on March 13, 2020, during the live Sport Relief telecast charity event. On April 3, 2020, the group performed an exclusive acoustic version of "React" in partnership with Vero and Hunger Magazine.

== Critical reception ==
Rob Copsey from the Official Charts Company felt that the song was continuation of their discography from 2009, "it's a relief to be honest, as any attempt to fit in with the current pop landscape would have felt futile. That doesn't lessen the fact that 'React' is a proper, Pussycat Dolls banger." In writing for Yahoo! News Canada, Jazz Tangcay agreed with earlier sentiments saying that "React" is "a killer tune" with a "powerful dance beat".

"A supersized sassy banger" is how Idolator's Mike Reid described "React", drawing comparisons to the group's 2006 singles "Beep" and "Wait a Minute". Reid concluded that the song was one of the "first standout releases of 2020 and deserves to be a chart-dominating smash". Similarly Daniel Megarry from Gay Times called "React" a fierce comeback and an "electro-pop banger with a massive chorus that gives us everything we want from the iconic performers." Paper featured "React" in their 'Bops Only: 10 Songs You Need to Start Your Weekend Right' playlist, and praised the "electro-pop banger" for its "infectious energy [that] is sure to get a rise out of longtime fans and new ones alike." Hunger also named "React" as in their list of "the only tracks you need to hear right now" for the week beginning February 10, 2020. Brittany Spanos from Rolling Stone magazine praised the "catchy, bouncy pop tune" and stated "Thank God, the Pussycat Dolls are back". Matt Stopera from BuzzFeed called both the song and music video "instantly iconic".

In an article commenting on the Cash Cash remix of "React", Idolator's Mike Wass commented that "React" was "epic" and it was a crime against taste that it did not become a "chart topping smash" and that the group had also served one of the "best dance routines of 2020". The remix was praised for upping the beats per minute (BMP) and dramatic breakdown, saying all in all that Cash Cash did the remix justice.

== Media reception ==
=== Sexual image ===
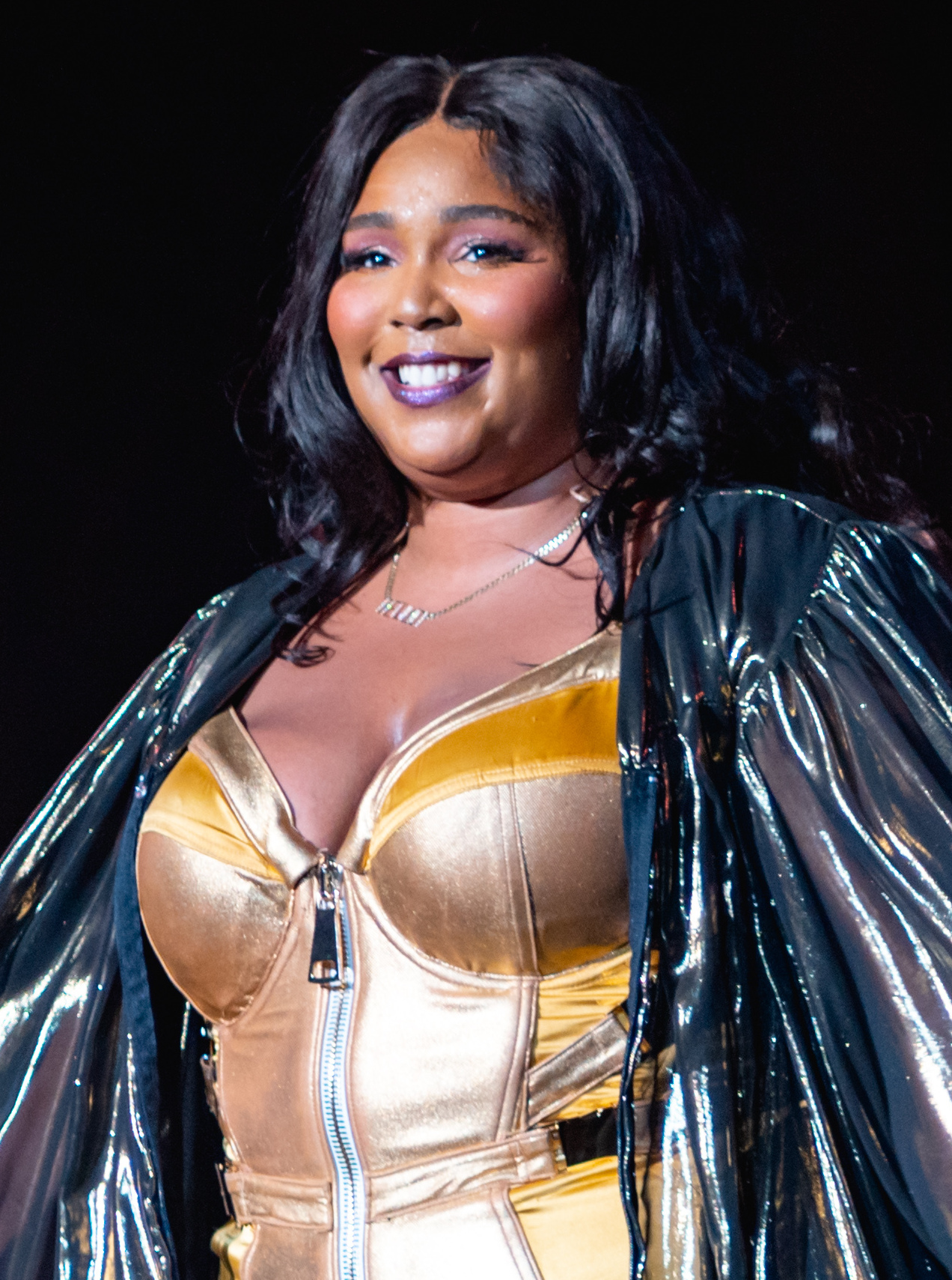
Scherzinger said the aim of their performances was to promote female empowerment and drew comparisons between the media coverage received by the group to that of fellow singer Lizzo.

The group received some negative reception, particularly towards the groups' perceived sexual nature and dance moves and costumes during live performances of "React". After their debut performance of the song on The X Factor: Celebrity, over 400 viewers complained to British broadcasting regulator Ofcom around the raunchy nature of the performance. Responding to the criticism, Scherzinger compared the group's desire to be empowering to American singer Lizzo who is a strong advocate for body consciousness, saying:

If you have people like Lizzo leading the movement of accepting yourself and they don't get any criticism, then why are we getting this criticism? When we perform, we perform from a place of passion and power. We're not floundering out there just trying to be cute. We come like warriors out there and people feel empowered by that."

— Scherzinger during an interview with Entertainment Tonight

During a performance on Ant & Dec's Saturday Night Takeaway, the group poked fun out of the negative attention they received by performing as part of a comedy skit where their performance was censored. Following the performance, member Carmit Bachar responded to reports that once again viewers had complained to Ofcom by saying "being on Ant & Dec's show was hysterical; they are so good at what they do and the way they made light of the whole censorship thing was amazing. It's great that we got to be silly with it and we had a blast." She supported early comments by Scherzinger that the intention and aims of the group's performances was always about empowerment, saying "everyone has an opinion on what we do, and while I think the power of a woman can be intimidating, it's all about the intention of our performances".

Despite the comedic nature of the performance, the group's appearance on Saturday Night Takeaway resulted in further complaints to Ofcom. Roberts likened the groups' outfits to costumes and responded by noting that the group were entertainers. She said "we are wearing costumes... and they are sassy and fierce. We are owning our femininity and celebrating ourselves as women". Later, despite the BBC working with the group to put on a suitable performance pre-watershed during The One Show, 119 viewers complained about the performance of "React". The BBC defended the performance and released a statement saying "The Pussycat Dolls are well known for their dance routines and outfits and we announced at the start of the show that they would be appearing... we felt it was appropriate for the time slot and wouldn't fall outside the expectations of most viewers. However, we appreciate that some viewers didn't agree."

=== Criticism of media coverage ===
In March 2020, during an interview with Network Ten's The Project, Scherzinger acknowledged that the costumes for their recent performances and the music video for "React" were provocative but said "but we are women now and like literally as we say, (our bums) were hanging out and it takes courage to be that, you know it is vulnerable wearing as much as that, it takes a lot of courage to do it and we always do everything with confidence with the intent of empowering others and all of our women out there and anyone who feels they relate to us". Articles for both News.com.au and Junkee criticized hosts of The Project for focusing on a perceived sexual nature of their dance moves and for making the interview with Scherzinger awkward. One of The Project's hosts Waleed Aly asked questions such as whether the girls "fight over who wore the best tube tops and low rise jeans?".

Jared Richards (from Junkee) said "it's a mess, absolutely dismissive of Scherzinger as a person and The Pussycat Dolls as an act... While sex appeal is a big part of The Pussycat Dolls, a group which started as a burlesque performance, there's a right and a wrong way to ask about it." During the closing segment of the interview, Scherzinger was cut off as she said "if you watch us, we dance with heart, we dance like warriors, we come from a real place of power..." As the music played, Scherzinger could be heard asking if the interview was about to cut to another segment. Viewers of the programme also disapproved of the hosts for the misogynistic nature of the interview. Music News also reported that hundreds of viewers complained about the segment via Twitter.

=== Second break-up ===
Following delays to the planned concert tour due to COVID-19 pandemic, subsequent reports emerged of a rift between Scherzinger and the group's founder Robin Antin. The media reported that Scherzinger was refusing to tour until contracts were renegotiated whereas Scherzinger claimed financial impropriety by Antin. Both parties would go on to sue each other for breach of contract. The tour was subsequently cancelled, making "React" the first and only song the group would release since reforming until the group reformed for a second time in 2026.

== Chart performance ==
"React" performed best on the Scottish Singles Chart where it opened at number two behind "Blinding Lights" by Canadian singer The Weeknd. The song also debuted in the top-ten on the Media Forest Singles Chart in Israel, and Single Top 40 chart in Hungary. It made a number of top-ten and top-twenty debuts on Digital singles charts including number ten on the Australian Digital Tracks chart, number 12 on both the US Digital Songs and Canadian Digital Songs charts and then number 19 on New Zealand Hot Singles Chart. In the UK, "React" entered the UK Singles Chart at number 29 becoming the group's first chart entry since 2009's "Hush Hush; Hush Hush" and although it is their 11th top-forty entry, it is their first to miss the top-twenty. Hugh McIntyre from Forbes noted that all of the group's singles released in the UK to date have charted in the top-forty. As an independent release, the song was eligible for the UK Indie Chart where it debuted at number four. It also peaked at number three on the UK Digital Songs chart. The track peaked at number 23 in Ireland. In Switzerland, the song debuted at number 75, becoming their 11th chart entry but their lowest peak since "Wait a Minute" featuring Timbaland in 2007 which reached number 41.

== Music video ==
=== Main video ===
==== Development ====
The Pussycat Dolls flew to Los Angeles the week of January 14, 2020, to film the music video for "React". The video was inspired by their The X Factor: Celebrity performance where the group performed on chairs and had a choreographed dance scene involving water; the video would incorporate some of these same elements. During the shoot, Scherzinger threw her back out, she said, "we worked so hard on the video in fact, I threw my back out, I threw a couple of ribs out but it is all for the love... we did it because did not want to disappoint!" "React" was directed by British duo Bradley & Pablo, with Robin Antin and Mikey Minden serving as creative directors. Scherzinger took a lead role in choreographing the routine alongside the other members of the group. During an interview with Entertainment Weekly, she said "The girls are all very experienced professional dancers so they always have their say on choreography as well. Everybody kinda has their own strengths and we really work well collectively as a group. But, yeah, I'm very opinionated and, as the girls know, I come with a lot of ideas and then we all work together to see what's best for business."

==== Concept and synopsis ====
The music video recreates the chair and water routine from the group's performance on The X Factor: Celebrity which was noted as being reminiscent of the film, Flashdance (1983).

On February 4, The Dolls released images from the music video showing the group "dressed in beige skintight PVC lingerie with matching thigh high boots, being drenched with water as they straddle chairs. Another image taken from the video shows the group in black leather outfits, reminiscent of the "Buttons" music video. The video is sequenced from several scenes and predominately features the group in two sets of leather and latex outfits, the first in black and the second in nude. In between the dance scenes, close-ups of the girls in on their own and in subgroups are shown, with some additional solo choreography performed by Scherzinger. Entertainment Weekly's Ruth Kinane described the overall concept of the video as "wild choreography" all performed while "drenched in water, backlit by flames".

Rolling Stone described the accompanying visuals as a "dance-heavy video full of gravity-defying choreography." The video and dance routine also includes a move called the "human teepee" where the girls perform a split upside down. Pyrotechnics were also involved in the video, with Wyatt saying "it was the most intense thing I've ever done. We were in close proximity to the fire and we had soot coming out of our noses by the end of the shoot." CNN's Alaa Elassar summarised the overall synopsis and sequencing of the video's scenes as "fire, leather outfits, and lots of seductive dancing in the rain".

==== Release and reception ====
The music video for "React" was released on February 7, 2020, simultaneously alongside the song. Ruth Kinane from Entertainment Weekly described the video as full of "impressive and racy dance moves". Vulture's Zoe Haylock compared Scherzinger to looking like Kim Kardashian during some of the video, stating that "React" was a "2000s-choreography-focused video with costuming from 2020". She summed up her review by saying "we'll see what other high bars the Pussycat Dolls wanna set as they roll out the rest of their reunion". Similarly Chicago Tribune's Jazz Tangcay agreed, saying that the video was a throwback to previous music videos with "everything fans loved about them in the first place: great choreography". Also comparing the song to previous single, "Buttons", Tangcay said the group "display[ed] their fiery hot moves amid flames, water and, most dangerous of all, chairs". In writing for People, Dave Quinn praised the video saying "in true Pussycat Dolls fashion, the video is jam-packed with steamy visuals and killer choreography".

Daniel Welsh from the Huffington Post called it "their most provocative video yet" and even though "Scherzinger takes centre stage", each "of the five band members get their moment in the spotlight". A review for CNN called the music video a sultry comeback for the group. Along a similar theme, 97.1 Wave FM's Ali Hill called the video "steamy" and a "worthwhile wait". Meanwhile, following a positive review of the song, Gay Times' Daniel Megarry said "[...] and don't even get us started on the music video. The outfits! The choreography! The hair flips! Our wigs? SNATCHED." GMA News also praised the video for proving that the group are "hotter than ever". By the end of the first day, the video had received over 1.5 million views.

=== Remix videos ===
On April 1, 2020, an alternative music video premiered on YouTube for the song's official remix which was produced by American electronic music trio Cash Cash. The remix video features the same footage and scenes from the original video with additional visual effects and edited sequencing.

On April 3, 2020, an exclusive acoustic performance of "React" was directed by British photographer Rankin for the social media app Vero and Hunger magazine at Rankin's East London Studio. Writing for CelebMix, Katrina Rees said the "acoustic performance makes the sizzling single sound even better than before." She praised the new version of the song for putting the group's harmonies center stage ahead of dancing. The new version of "React" features a black and white music video with the girls sat on chairs, backed by a piano-led production. OK!'s Aylo Soguksu noted that the group's new version of "React" came with a "black and white video" that shows the group "performing in sexy black outfits".

== Track listing and versions ==
Digital download / Streaming

1. "React" – 3:24

Digital download / Streaming – Cash Cash remix

1. "React" (Cash Cash Remix) 3:16

Streaming (video) – acoustic

1. "React" (acoustic) [presented by Vero] – 2:21

Brabo music remix^{[a]}

1. "React" (Brabo music) (featuring Pabllo Vittar) – 2:45

DJ club remix

1. "React" (Trace Adam remix)

Ligotti Bootleg remix

1. "React" (Pussycat Dolls vs David Puentez)

Notes

- ^{^[a]} The Brabo remix of "React" was produced for the group's appearance at the LGBTIQA+ Parade in São Paulo which was cancelled due to the COVID-19 pandemic. This version was never officially released.

== Personnel and credits ==
Song

- Carmit Bachar – vocals
- Matthew Brownlie – engineer
- Georgia Buchanan – songwriter
- Wez Clarke – mixing
- Brian Cruz – Engineer
- Leyre Granda – A&R, coordination
- Andy Guerrero – assistant engineer
- Johan Gustafson – bass, songwriter, drums, keyboards, producer, programming, sound effects, synthesizer
- Ivares – producer
- Paul Kennedy – coordination, production manager
- Ashley Roberts – vocals
- Nicole Scherzinger – lead vocals, songwriter
- Jessica Sutta – vocals
- Will Simms – bass, songwriter, drums, engineer, keyboards, producer, programming, sound effects, synthesizer
- Dave Turner – mastering
- Hannah Wilson – songwriter
- Kimberly Wyatt – vocals

Song credits adapted from AllMusic and press release.

Music video

- Bradley & Pablo – directors
- Danny Hiele – director of photography
- Ed Hoadley – post producer
- George K – grading
- Juliette Larthe – executive producer
- Ross Levine – producer
- Chris Roebuck – editor
- Ted Thornton – executive producer

Video credits taken from Bradley and Pablo website and Promonews.

Live acoustic performance (video)

- Rankin – director

Credits taken from YouTube.

== Charts ==
Chart performance for "React"
Chart (2020)	Peak position
Australia Digital Tracks (ARIA)	10
Belgium (Ultratip Bubbling Under Wallonia)	19
Belgium (Ultratop 50 Airplay (Wallonia))	48
Canadian Digital Song Sales (Billboard)	12
Euro Digital Song Sales (Billboard)	4
France Downloads (SNEP)	21
Germany Downloads (Official German Charts)	12
Greece International (IFPI)	35
Hungary (Single Top 40)	9
Ireland (IRMA)	23
Israel (Media Forest)	10
New Zealand Hot Singles (RMNZ)	19
North Macedonia Airplay (Radiomonitor)	15
Romania (Airplay 100)	38
Scottish Singles Sales (Official Charts)	2
Serbia Airplay (Radiomonitor)	9
Switzerland (Schweizer Hitparade)	75
UK Singles (Official Charts)	29
UK Indie (Official Charts)	4
US Dance Club Songs (Billboard)	34
US Digital Song Sales (Billboard)	12

== Certifications ==
Certifications for "React"
Region	Certification	Certified units/sales
Australia (ARIA)	Gold	35,000^{‡}
United Kingdom (BPI)	Silver	200,000^{‡}
^{‡} Sales+streaming figures based on certification alone.

== Release history ==
Release formats and dates for "React"
Country	Date	Format	Song Version	Label	Ref.
Various	February 7, 2020	Digital download; streaming	Original	Access^{[a]}	
Australia	February 7, 2020	Airplay	Original	Mushroom	
United Kingdom	February 22, 2020	Adult contemporary radio	Original	Access^{[a]}	
Various	February 26, 2020	Digital download; streaming	Trace Adam remix	Access^{[a]}	
Various	March 6, 2020	Digital download; streaming	Ligotti Bootleg remix	Access^{[a]}	
Various	April 3, 2020	Digital download; streaming	Cash Cash remix	Access^{[a]}	
Various	April 3, 2020	YouTube streaming	Acoustic performance	Access^{[a]}	

Notes

- ^{^[a]} except Australia where Mushroom Records handled the release.
