= Call Me Loop =

English singer and songwriter

- Born: Georgia Elisabeth Laura Buchanan; 23 December 1990 (age 35); Surrey, England
- Education: Guildford High School; University of Exeter
- Occupations: Singer; songwriter
- Years active: 2016–present
- Musical career
- Genres: Pop
- Instrument: Vocals
- Website: callmeloop.com

Georgia Elisabeth Laura Buchanan (born 23 December 1990), known professionally as Georgia Bunchanan or Call Me Loop, is an English singer and songwriter. Following the release of her debut single "Looking at You" in 2016, she independently released two extended plays, Call Me Loop (2017) and Drama (2019). In 2023, she announced her decision to stop releasing her own music and instead focus on writing material for other artists.

== Early life ==
Call Me Loop was born as Georgia Buchanan on 23 December 1990. She began writing songs and performing at the age of five, and participated in talent shows at school and summer camp. For her fourteenth birthday, her parents paid for the opportunity to record her first song in a professional recording studio. After attending Guildford High School, from which she graduated from in 2009, she studied drama at the University of Exeter. After her graduation, she relocated from Surrey to South London in order to pursue a career in music.

== Career ==
Originally known by the name Loop, Buchanan rebranded herself as Call Me Loop. In April 2016, Call Me Loop independently released her debut single, "Thinking of You". This was followed by various single releases including "Losing My Mind", "As If" and "Know Me Better". "As If" received attention from the public when Elton John selected the song to play on his Beats 1 radio show. In May 2017, she supported English DJ Jonas Blue on his European tour. Later that month, she released a self-titled extended play, which was acclaimed by critics. Later that year, she released "Maybe I'm a Liar", which Popjustice described as a "sprightly, R&B‑infused tropical slinker".

Following the release of more singles including "Give 'n' Take", "Love the Lie", "Business" and "Silly Boy", Call Me Loop released her second extended play, Drama. Georgia Maher of The Line of Best Fit described Drama as a "solid collection of vibrant, infectious pop wonders", and titled her a "rising pop maverick", complimenting her songwriting ability. In 2020, "React", a song she co-wrote, was released by The Pussycat Dolls. She expressed her excitement at writing for them, commenting: "To have written it for an iconic girl band that I grew up listening to is just mind-blowing." This was followed by the release of her next singles, "Downhill From Here" and "Strike". She returned in 2022 with the singles "Year of the Ex" and "Painkiller". In 2023, she released her final single, "Goodbye Song". She explained that independently releasing music was no longer financially viable for her and began focusing on writing material for other artists.

== Discography ==
=== Extended plays ===
Title	Details
Call Me Loop	Released: 12 May 2017; Label: Independent; Format: Digital download
Drama	Released: 8 March 2019; Label: Independent; Format: Digital download

=== Singles ===
Title	Year	Album
"Looking at You"	2016	Non-album single
"Losing My Mind"	2016	Call Me Loop
"As If"	2017	Call Me Loop
"Know Me Better"	2017	Call Me Loop
"Maybe I'm a Liar"	2017	Non-album singles
"Give 'n' Take"	2018	Non-album singles
"Love the Lie"	2018	Non-album singles
"Cut & Run"	2018	Non-album singles
"Business"	2018	Drama
"Cry Like Kim K" (with Lisa Ajax)	2018	Non-album single
"Silly Boy"	2019	Drama
"Self Love"	2019	Non-album singles
"Downhill From Here"	2020	Non-album singles
"Strike"	2020	Non-album singles
"Rosé"	2020	Non-album singles
"Year of the Ex"	2022	Non-album singles
"Painkiller"	2022	Non-album singles
"Pattern of Behaviour"	2022	Non-album singles
"Walls"	2023	Non-album singles
"Butterflies"	2023	Non-album singles
"Goodbye Song"	2023	Non-album singles

=== Songwriting credits ===
Year	Title	Artist	Album	Notes
2020	"React"	The Pussycat Dolls	Non-album single	Co-writer
2022	"Cool (Your Rainbow)"	Nmixx	Entwurf	Co-writer
