= When I Grow Up (The Pussycat Dolls song) =

2008 single by The Pussycat Dolls

Single by the Pussycat Dolls

from the album Doll Domination
- Released: May 27, 2008
- Recorded: 2007–2008
- Studio: 2nd Floor (Orlando); Chalice (Los Angeles)
- Genre: Electropop; R&B
- Length: 4:05
- Label: Interscope
- Songwriters: Rodney "Darkchild" Jerkins; Theron Thomas; Timothy Thomas; Jim McCarty; Paul Samwell-Smith
- Producer: Darkchild

The Pussycat Dolls singles chronology
"Wait a Minute" (2006)	"When I Grow Up" (2008)	"Whatcha Think About That" (2008)

Music video
- "When I Grow Up" on YouTube

"When I Grow Up" is a song by American girl group the Pussycat Dolls from their second studio album Doll Domination (2008). It was released by Interscope Records on May 27, 2008, as the lead single from the album. It was first written for Britney Spears, but was rejected. It was then considered and recorded for Nicole Scherzinger's planned solo project, Her Name Is Nicole, but after its cancellation and Scherzinger's return to the group, she felt that the song was better suited for the group. "When I Grow Up" was written by Theron Thomas, Timothy Thomas, and Rodney "Darkchild" Jerkins, who also produced the song. It is an uptempo electropop and R&B song, sampling the 1966 song, "He's Always There" by British rock band The Yardbirds. "When I Grow Up" speaks about the desire to be famous, and was described as being "autobiographical" by Scherzinger.

"When I Grow Up" was their first single following the departure of the group's longest-standing member Carmit Bachar. It was received favorably by contemporary music critics, many of whom highlighted it as a stand-out. It peaked at number nine on the US Billboard Hot 100, becoming the group's highest-charting single since "Buttons" (2006). The song has sold over two million digital copies in the United States, making the Pussycat Dolls the first female group in digital history to have three singles pass the two million mark in digital sales. The song reached the top five in countries such as Australia, Canada, France, Ireland, New Zealand, and the United Kingdom, and the top ten in Austria, Denmark, Germany, and Switzerland.

The song's accompanying music video premiered on June 13, 2008. Directed by Joseph Kahn, it portrays the Pussycat Dolls in a traffic jam on Hollywood Boulevard. It was complimented for its dance breakdown, and was nominated in five categories at the 2008 MTV Video Music Awards, the most of that ceremony, and went on to win Best Dance Video. The Pussycat Dolls performed the song on television shows including Jimmy Kimmel Live! and So You Think You Can Dance, as well as several awards shows including the 2008 American Music Awards, and throughout their Doll Domination Tour (2009).

== Background ==
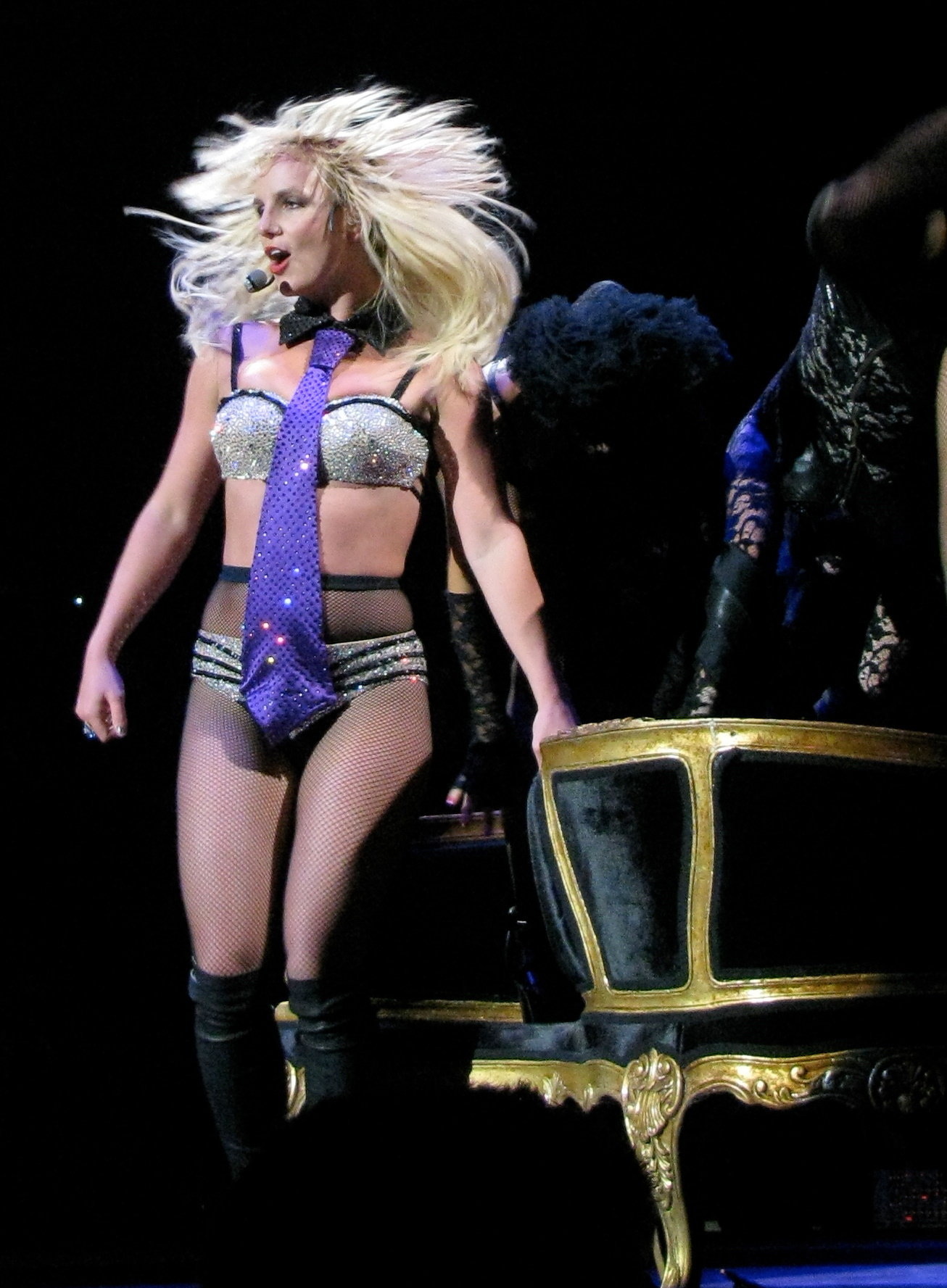
The song was originally written for Britney Spears (pictured) for either her 2007 album Blackout or 2008 album Circus. The lyrics were loosely based on her 2007 breakdown.

Following the commercial success of PCD (2005), and over the course of two years (2005–07), Scherzinger recorded 75-100 songs for Her Name Is Nicole, her planned solo debut album. Her work as lead singer furthered Scherzinger's popularity as she began work on her own music. She stated that she enjoyed collaborating with many different artists and that although she had been writing songs for over ten years, she felt as if she was at a different level while working with such A-list writers and producers. Following the moderate success of "Baby Love", the complete lack of success of the singles such as "Whatever U Like" and numerous delays, Scherzinger decided to halt production on her debut album. She then returned her focus back on the Pussycat Dolls, and recording commenced for their second studio album. During the process of recording Her Name is Nicole, Scherzinger would state that many of the songs were better suited to the Pussycat Dolls including "When I Grow Up".

"For me it was what I wanted to do. I'm a relentless perfectionist and I realised that a lot of the songs from my record should be Pussycat Dolls songs including 'When I Grow Up'. Next year I want to put out my solo album and I think the two will be able to co-exist nicely together."

— Scherzinger on why she halted production of her solo album.

"When I Grow Up" was written by Theron and Timothy Thomas, along with Rodney "Darkchild" Jerkins, who also produced the song. It was written for Britney Spears, and the original lyrics of the song included her name and related more to her 2007 breakdown. It was considered for either her Blackout or Circus albums, but they were rejected. Scherzinger recorded the song her then titled debut album Her Name is Nicole but ultimately decided it was a better fit for the Dolls' second album, Doll Domination. Paul Foley, Mike "Handz" Donaldson and Roberto "Tito" Vazquez tooled the song at 2nd Floor Studios in Orlando and Chalice Studios in Los Angeles, and was mixed by Spike Stent and Rodney "Darkchild" Jerkins at Chalice Studios in Los Angeles. The Yardbirds' drummer Jim McCarty and bassist Paul Samwell-Smith both received co-writing credits for the song, for its sample of "He's Always There" (1966). "When I Grow Up" made its world premiere online on May 16, 2008, and was issued as a digital download in North America on May 27. It was later serviced to contemporary hit radio in the United States on June 1, 2008. The release of "When I Grow Up" came after the departure of member Carmit Bachar. It was officially confirmed, after months of speculation, on March 4, 2008, that Bachar had left the group to follow "other performance interests". At the time of her departure, she had been the longest member of the group, joining in 1995 when they were a burlesque act.

== Composition ==
"When I Grow Up"
A 24-second sample of the chorus of "When I Grow Up", which features the Pussycat Dolls lead singer Nicole Scherzinger expressing a crave for fame, while later warning the listener of the "high cost" of it.

"When I Grow Up" is an uptempo electropop and R&B song that lasts four minutes and five seconds. Built around "bouncy synth lines" and a "thudding" bassline, the song features a heavy use of sirens, handclaps, and pitch-shifted vocals. Scherzinger was cited as adopting Britney Spears' breathiness against the song's sirens, shouts and "pumping beat". Jaime Gill from Yahoo Music UK described "When I Grow Up" as a "dark, dissonant club banger", while Rudy Klapper from Sputnikmusic compared the song's composition to that of Basement Jaxx's 2003 track "Plug It In". "When I Grow Up" contains a sample of the main riff of "He's Always There" by British rock band The Yardbirds, from their third studio album Roger the Engineer (1966). The song's writers, Jim McCarty and Paul Samwell-Smith, were honored for their contributions to the song at the American Society of Composers, Authors and Publishers (ASCAP).

According to the sheet music published by Sony/ATV Music Publishing, "When I Grow Up" is set in common time with a tempo of 120 beats per minute. It is composed in the key of E minor, with Scherzinger's vocal range spanning from the low note of E_{3} to the high note of G_{5}. Lyrically, the song is centered around the desire to be famous when one grows up. Using satirical and autobiographical lines, Scherzinger begins the song's first verse with: "Now I've got a confession / When I was young I wanted attention". The "repetitive and catchy chorus" follows, where she sings the lines: "When I grow up / I wanna be famous / I wanna be a star / I wanna be in movies". MTV News commented that the song contains a theme that is "getting plenty of traction these days – beware the high cost of fame." Meanwhile, group member Melody Thornton said of the song's concept: "If you strive for higher and bigger things – along with that – comes hard work and dealing with a lot of stuff that you'd never assume you'd have to. So yeah, while the song is meant to be playful, it still does have that little warning twist to it". Bill Lamb from About.com named "When I Grow Up" a possible answer song to Pink's "Stupid Girls" (2006). Music critics were initially confused by the line "I wanna have groupies" in the chorus; mistaking the line as saying "I wanna have boobies". American comedian Ellen DeGeneres also pointed this out when they performed the song on her talk show on September 23, 2008. Nicole Scherzinger said that "All of us started with a dream...I know when I was young, and I would sign people's notebooks, I wrote, 'Remember me when I'm famous,' and I don't know of a little kid who hasn't aspired to be someone"

== Remixes ==
A number of remixes were commissioned by Interscope Records to accompany the song. On July 23, 2008, a remix of "When I Grow Up" featuring a rap verse from American rapper Eve was released. Later that same day, a second remix was released online. Entitled the "Darkchild Remix", it features an entirely different beat than the original, with added vocals from American rappers Diddy, Lil Wayne and Fatman Scoop, as well as the song's producer Rodney "Darkchild" Jerkins. Elements of Michael Jackson's "Thriller" (1984) were heavily sampled throughout the remix, most noticeably in the song's introduction. Lil Wayne's verse was later removed and replaced by a new verse by the song's composers, Rock City, due to issues with it being cleared in time for its commercial release as a B-side to "Whatcha Think About That", the second single from Doll Domination. For unknown reasons, the remix was never released. Additional "club" and "dub" remixes of "When I Grow Up" by DJs Dave Audé, Digital Dog, Dirty South and Ralphi Rosario, and the electronic band Wideboys were also released in a series of Compact Disc single and digital download releases.

== Commercial performance ==
In the United States, the song debuted on the Billboard Hot 100 at number 76 on the issue dated June 14, 2008. On its second week, the song sold 34,000 digital downloads and ascended to number 31. In its fourth week, it reached its peak position of number nine, becoming the group's highest-charting single since "Buttons" which peaked at number three in 2006. It became their fourth and last top-ten hit. The song topped the Hot Dance Club Play chart, the issue dated August 2, 2008. The song has sold over 2,180,000 digital downloads in the United States to date, according to Nielsen Soundscan, making the Pussycat Dolls the first all-female group in digital history to have three singles—along with "Don't Cha" and "Buttons"—pass the two million mark in digital sales. In Canada, the song debuted at number fifteen on the Canadian Hot 100. On the chart dated September 6, 2008, "When I Grow Up" ascended and peaked at number three.

In Australia, the song debuted at number 45, on June 22, 2008. In its sixth week, the song peaked at number two and stayed there for three consecutive weeks. "When I Grow Up" was certified platinum by the Australian Recording Industry Association (ARIA) for shipments of 70,000 copies. In New Zealand, the song debuted on the chart at number 33. It reached number five a few weeks later. and was certified gold by the Recording Industry Association of New Zealand (RIANZ) for selling over 7,500 copies. In the United Kingdom "When I Grow Up" debuted and peaked at number three on the UK Singles Chart with sales of 29,688. On the Billboard European Hot 100 Singles the song peaked at number three, and also peaked at number nine in Germany. Also in Europe, and particularly in France, the song performed successfully and strongly and stayed at number two the first week of October 2008 and remained during three weeks at the second spot, blocked by "Beggin'" by Madcon, becoming Pussycat Dolls's first top five in the country, their longest-running single and their highest charting song, previously held by their 2005 single "Don't Cha". In the Netherlands and Belgium, the song debuted at number three.

== Critical response ==
"When I Grow Up" received favorable reviews from music critics. Bill Lamb from About.com listed "When I Grow Up" among the top tracks on Doll Domination, stating that the song "bursts out of the blocks", and that it was of no surprise that it "landed in the pop top 10 with ease". On a separate review, Lamb gave the song three out of five stars. He noted that the "anonymous nature" of the group's vocals and "sexual lyrical tease" is starting to wear thin, stating: "This is more of the same, not a step forward". Lamb, however, did compliment the song as being a "catchy dance workout", and stated that the song carries their "usual sassiness" and "pounding dance beats". Nick Levine from Digital Spy echoed Lamb's comments, noting that the song is a "bolshy, hyperactive pop stomper that works just as well in the aerobics class as it does on the dance-floor." He continued: "If they keep releasing singles as infectious as this, they could last longer than we'd think." August Brown from Los Angeles Times called the song as the "ideological centerpiece" of Doll Domination.

Sal Cinquemani from Slant Magazine described the song as a "catchy, full-throttle club track" and commented that it is "a perfectly concocted blend of camp and vamp for the famous burlesque troupe". Steve Perkins from BBC Music awarded the song four out of five stars writing: "It's good to see that the dynamics of the group remain fundamentally unchanged" and that the song was a strong comeback. He also noted that: "The whole song seems to be centred around the desire to be famous when you grow up, which while not my favourite of all messages to give out to The Kids". He ended his review writing "but in all fairness: who cares? It's hella catchy, and really, who's the bigger fool here – the Pussycat Dolls lyricist who wrote some vaguely nonsensical lyrics, or the reviewer who expected anything different?" Dan Cairns from The Times said that "if every song here were as batty and brilliant as this, Doll Domination would be one of the great pop records of 2008." However, Nic Oliver from MusicOMH, in a review of Doll Domination, did not favor the song, saying that the song would embarrass Paris Hilton, but "sets the template for the rest of the album."

== Music video ==
The song's music video was shot on Hollywood Boulevard in Los Angeles, with director Joseph Kahn. American recording artist Britney Spears filmed a cameo appearance for the video on June 4 at the Warner Bros. lot in Los Angeles. An on set "insider" said that Spears' scene was short, only consisting of her driving in a passing car and waving to the other girls. On June 12, 2008, it was announced by MTV News that the cameo had been cut from the final video. Scherzinger was asked why Spears got cut from the video. She said: "I honestly am not so sure. You shoot a lot of things when you do a video. Some things stay in but other things don't make the cut and Britney just didn't make it. I've seen a little clip of her performance and she looked adorable so I really wish she was in it! Hopefully we'll work together in the future." A short clip of the music video was released online on June 12, 2008; a day before the video's premiere on June 13, 2008, on FNMTV.

In the video, the Pussycat Dolls are shown sitting in a car in the middle of a traffic jam, where Scherzinger flashes a ring that says "famous". They sing the introduction of the song in the car before jumping out. When the chorus kicks in, the women leave the car and stand on the roofs of the other cars and start dancing a routine. Then they walk down a street of Hollywood stars with bubbles floating all around them. As they walk down the street, they also stop to sing on a bench. As the second chorus starts, the Dolls climb scaffolding and begin to dance. During Scherzinger's solo, she stands in a small area with the Pussycat Dolls logo to the left and a mirror to the right, with lights flashing. The Dolls then dance in the breakdown section with the logo behind them and the camera zooms out to reveal filming equipment and playback screens.

Nick Levine from Digital Spy, wrote that: "The Pussycat Dolls have a novel way of amusing themselves during traffic jams" and described the dance breakdown as "entertaining" and "nostalgic". In Australia, the video was criticized for the video being too raunchy. On August 17, 2008, it was announced that the video was nominated for Video of the Year, Best Dance Video, Best Art Direction, Best Cinematography, and Best Choreography at the 2008 MTV Video Music Awards, having the most VMA nominations of that year. The ceremony was held on September 7, 2008, and the video won the award for the Best Dancing. The music video was the fifteenth-most streamed video on MTV.com in 2008.

== Live performances ==
"When I Grow Up" debuted live on American talk show Jimmy Kimmel Live! on May 20, 2008. On May 27, 2008, MTV News reported that the Pussycat Dolls were among many set to perform at the 2008 MTV Movie Awards on June 1, 2008. Scherzinger talked about the performance saying: "This is a big deal for us. We just want to kill it. It's all about the Dolls right now, and we're coming strong." The girls performed wearing spandex-and-leather getups, while a backdrop was displayed in the background with images of flashbulbs, tabloid headlines and diamonds. They were joined by America's Best Dance Crew winners the Jabbawockeez who descended from the ceiling wearing matching red T-shirts with stark-white masks covering their faces, and baseball caps perched at 45-degree angles atop their heads. Of the performance, Geoff Boucher from the Los Angeles Times commented: "the Pussycat Dolls' set climaxed with a powerful pyro display that left celebs in the first few rows feeling a bit roasted". MTV Buzzworthy described the performance as "sexy" and "sultry". However, Tod Martens, in another review for the Los Angeles Times, criticized their performance. He commented: "[They appeared] onstage looking like they had escaped a taping for a sexed-up Jazzercise video." He also wrote that Scherzinger never commanded the song except on "the cut's final seconds when she turned her vocals up to a growl" and noted JabbaWockeez's appearance as "annoy[ing]".

"When I Grow Up" was also performed on So You Think You Can Dance on June 13, 2008. On August 2, 2008, the Dolls performed the song and presented at the MTV Asia Awards 2008 in Kuala Lumpur, Malaysia, along with "Buttons" (2005). The group then performed the song at the Walmart Soundcheck, along with "I Hate This Part", "Takin' Over the World", "Buttons" and "Don't Cha". On November 21, they performed a medley of "I Hate This Part" and "When I Grow Up" at the 2008 American Music Awards. The performance included stripper poles, and the girls donned all-rubber outfits. The Pussycat Dolls also performed "When I Grow Up" on the Doll Domination Tour (2009). Maureen Ellis of the Evening Times said that the "high-energy encore of 'Don't Cha' and 'When I Grow Up' ensured the Dolls reigned supreme."

On November 26, 2019, they performed "When I Grow Up" in a medley on The X Factor: Celebrity with "Buttons", "Don't Cha" & "React" to promote their 2020 reunion tour. On February 22, 2020, they performed "When I Grow Up" in their performance at G-A-Y.

== Formats and track listings ==
- Digital download
1. "When I Grow Up" – 4:05
- Digital single
1. "When I Grow Up" – 3:58
2. "When I Grow Up" (Video) – 4:09
- Digital EP
1. "When I Grow Up" – 4:06
2. "When I Grow Up" (Dave Audé Audacious Club Dub) – 7:56
3. "When I Grow Up" (Wideboys Remix Club Dub) – 6:36
- European CD single
1. "When I Grow Up" (Main) – 4:07
2. "When I Grow Up" (Dave Audé Audacious Radio Mix) – 3:40
- German CD single
1. "When I Grow Up" (Main) – 4:02
2. "When I Grow Up" (Dave Audé Club Dub Remix) – 7:56
3. "When I Grow Up" (Wideboys Club Dub Remix) – 6:39
4. "When I Grow Up" (Video) – 4:09
- Italian 12-inch single

A1. "When I Grow Up" (Digital Dog Remix Club) – 6:42
A2. "When I Grow Up" (Wideboys Remix Full Club) – 6:35
B1. "When I Grow Up" (Dirty South Remix) – 8:45
B2. "When I Grow Up" (Ralphi Rosario Remix Club) – 9:36
B3. "When I Grow Up" (Main) – 3:59

- UK "The Remixes" CD single
1. "When I Grow Up" (Dave Audé Audacious Mixshow) – 6:04
2. "When I Grow Up" (Digital Dog Club Mix) – 6:24
3. "When I Grow Up" (Wideboys Club Mix) – 6:36
4. "When I Grow Up" (Dave Audé Audacious Club Dub) – 7:56
5. "When I Grow Up" (Dave Audé Audacious Radio) – 3:42
6. "When I Grow Up" (Main) – 4:09
- US 12-inch vinyl

A1. "When I Grow Up" (Main) – 3:58
A2. "When I Grow Up" (Instrumental) – 3:58
B1. "When I Grow Up" (Main) – 3:58
B2. "When I Grow Up" (Instrumental) – 3:58

== Credits and personnel ==
Credits are adapted from the Doll Domination liner notes.

Technical

- Recorded at: 2nd Floor Studios, Orlando and Chalice Studios, Los Angeles.
- Contains elements of the composition: "He's Always There", written by Jim McCarty and Paul Samwell-Smith.

Personnel

- Rodney "Darkchild" Jerkins – songwriting, producer, additional vocals, audio mixing
- Rock City (Theron and Timothy Thomas) – songwriting, additional vocals
- Jim McCarty – songwriting
- Paul Samwell-Smith – songwriting
- Paul Foley – recording
- Mike "Handz" Donaldson – recording
- Roberto "Tito" Vazquez – recording
- Spike Stent – audio mixing

== Charts ==
=== Weekly charts ===
Weekly chart performance for "When I Grow Up"
Chart (2008–2009)	Peak position
Australia (ARIA)	2
Australian Urban (ARIA)	1
Austria (Ö3 Austria Top 40)	7
Belgium (Ultratop 50 Flanders)	2
Belgium (Ultratop 50 Wallonia)	3
Canada Hot 100 (Billboard)	3
Canada CHR/Top 40 (Billboard)	3
Canada Hot AC (Billboard)	15
Czech Republic Airplay (ČNS IFPI)	1
Denmark (Tracklisten)	6
European Hot 100 Singles (Billboard)	3
Finland (Suomen virallinen lista)	9
France (SNEP)	2
Germany (GfK)	7
Hungary (Rádiós Top 40)	2
Hungary (Dance Top 40)	1
Ireland (IRMA)	2
Netherlands (Dutch Top 40)	25
Netherlands (Single Top 100)	2
New Zealand (Recorded Music NZ)	5
Norway (VG-lista)	13
Scottish Singles Sales (Official Charts)	3
Slovakia Airplay (ČNS IFPI)	12
Sweden (Sverigetopplistan)	9
Switzerland (Schweizer Hitparade)	10
UK Singles (Official Charts)	3
UK Hip Hop/R&B (Official Charts)	1
US Billboard Hot 100	9
US Dance Club Songs (Billboard)	1
US Pop Airplay (Billboard)	8
US Pop 100 (Billboard)	5
US Rhythmic Airplay (Billboard)	28
Venezuela Pop Rock (Record Report)	1

=== Year-end charts ===
2008 year-end chart performance for "When I Grow Up"
Chart (2008)	Position
Australia (ARIA)	13
Australian Urban (ARIA)	4
Austria (Ö3 Austria Top 40)	47
Belgium (Ultratop 50 Flanders)	34
Belgium (Ultratop 50 Wallonia)	69
Canada (Canadian Hot 100)	15
Canada CHR/Top 40 (Billboard)	11
Croatia International Airplay (HRT)	6
European Hot 100 Singles (Billboard)	19
France (SNEP)	20
Germany (Media Control GfK)	43
Hungary (Rádiós Top 40)	89
New Zealand (RIANZ)	29
Switzerland (Schweizer Hitparade)	54
UK Singles (OCC)	46
UK Urban (Music Week)	13
US Billboard Hot 100	49

2009 year-end chart performance for "When I Grow Up"
Chart (2009)	Position
European Hot 100 Singles (Billboard)	72
Hungary (Rádiós Top 40)	96

=== Decade-end charts ===
Decade-end chart performance for "When I Grow Up"
Chart (2000–2009)	Position
Australia (ARIA)	53

== Certifications and sales ==
Certifications and sales for "When I Grow Up"
Region	Certification	Certified units/sales
Australia (ARIA)	Platinum	70,000^{^}
Canada	—	120,000
Germany (BVMI)	Gold	150,000^{‡}
New Zealand (RMNZ)	Platinum	15,000^{*}
United Kingdom (BPI)	Platinum	792,000
United States	—	2,180,000
^{*} Sales figures based on certification alone.^{^} Shipments figures based on certification alone.^{‡} Sales+streaming figures based on certification alone.

== Release history ==
Release dates and formats for "When I Grow Up"
Region	Date	Format(s)	Label(s)	Ref.
United States	May 27, 2008	Digital download	Interscope	
United States	June 1, 2008	Contemporary hit radio	Interscope	
Australia	July 14, 2008	CD; digital download	Universal Music	
United States	July 29, 2008	12-inch vinyl	Interscope	
Germany	August 29, 2008	Maxi CD	Universal Music	
United Kingdom	September 8, 2008	CD	Polydor	
Belgium	September 9, 2008	CD	Polydor	
France	September 29, 2008	CD	Polydor	
Italy	September 29, 2008	12-inch vinyl	Time	
Japan	October 1, 2008	CD	Universal Music Japan	

== See also ==
- List of number-one dance singles of 2008 (U.S.)
- List of best-selling singles of the 2000s (Australia)
