= The Pussycat Dolls Tour =

Cancelled 2021 concert tour by the Pussycat Dolls

- Cancelled tour by The Pussycat Dolls
- The second promotional poster for the tour, adapted for the new dates after initial dates were postponed due to the COVID-19 pandemic

The Pussycat Dolls concert chronology
- Doll Domination Tour (2009); The Pussycat Dolls Tour; PCD Forever Tour (2026)

The Pussycat Dolls Tour (also informally known as The Unfinished Business Tour) was the planned third concert tour by American girl group the Pussycat Dolls. It was announced in 2019, when Nicole Scherzinger, Ashley Roberts, Carmit Bachar, Kimberly Wyatt and Jessica Sutta revealed that they were reforming for new music and a brand new concert tour. Former member Melody Thornton declined to reunite and decided to continue with her career as a solo recording artist. The announcement followed the release of "React", the first new song by the group in more than a decade.

The tour was due to begin in April 2020 with 10 arena dates around the UK and Ireland, but these were postponed until the Autumn and then Spring-Summer 2021 due to the worldwide COVID-19 pandemic. It was then scheduled to begin on May 21, 2021, with ten dates across the UK and Ireland. A number of festival dates were cancelled all together including a headline slot at Brighton Pride (UK), So Pop Festival (Australia and New Zealand), Untold Festival (Romania), and Superbloom Festival (Germany), while some international dates in Japan, Brazil, and the Philippines were postponed pending further confirmation. Following further delays which were down to the pandemic, breach of contracts and logistics, the tour was ultimately cancelled in January 2022 with the fate of the Pussycat Dolls unknown pending the legal dispute between Scherzinger and Antin regarding the terms of the group's business ventures.

== Background ==
Pussycat Dolls members reuniting for the tour

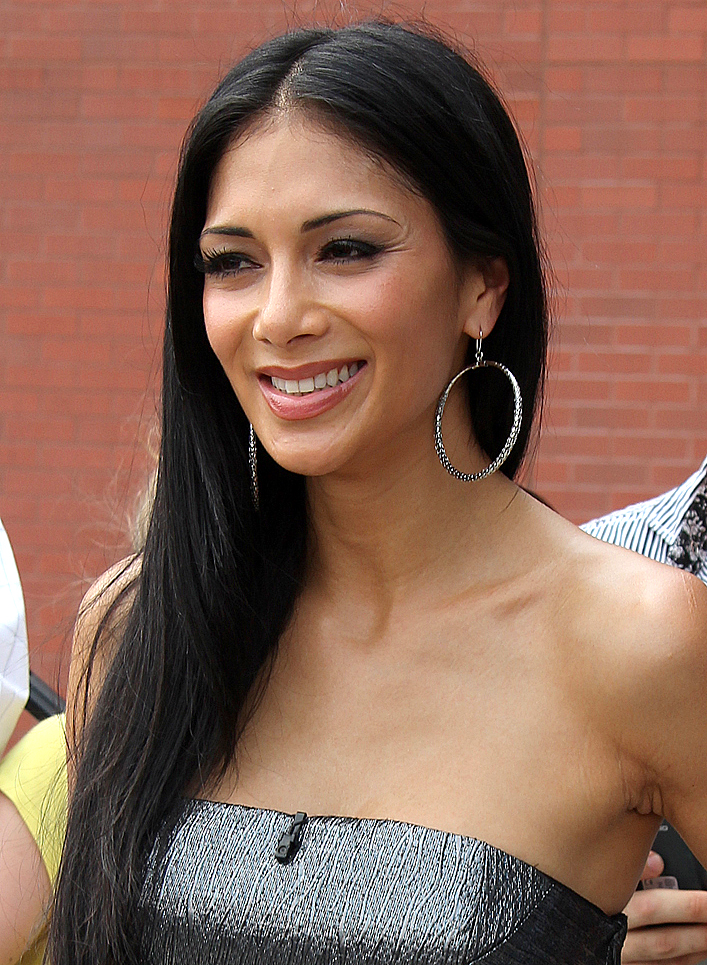
Nicole Scherzinger

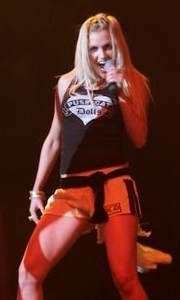
Ashley Roberts

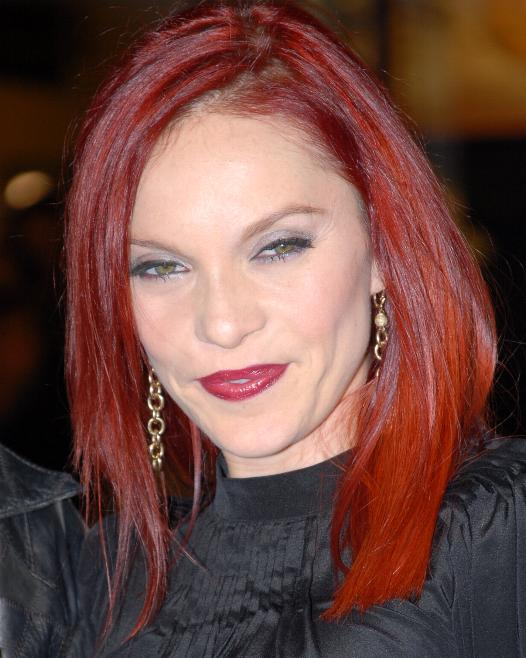
Carmit Bachar

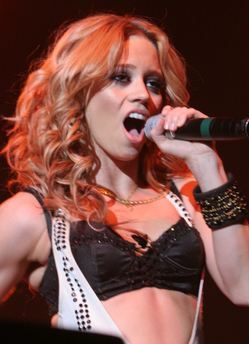
Kimberly Wyatt

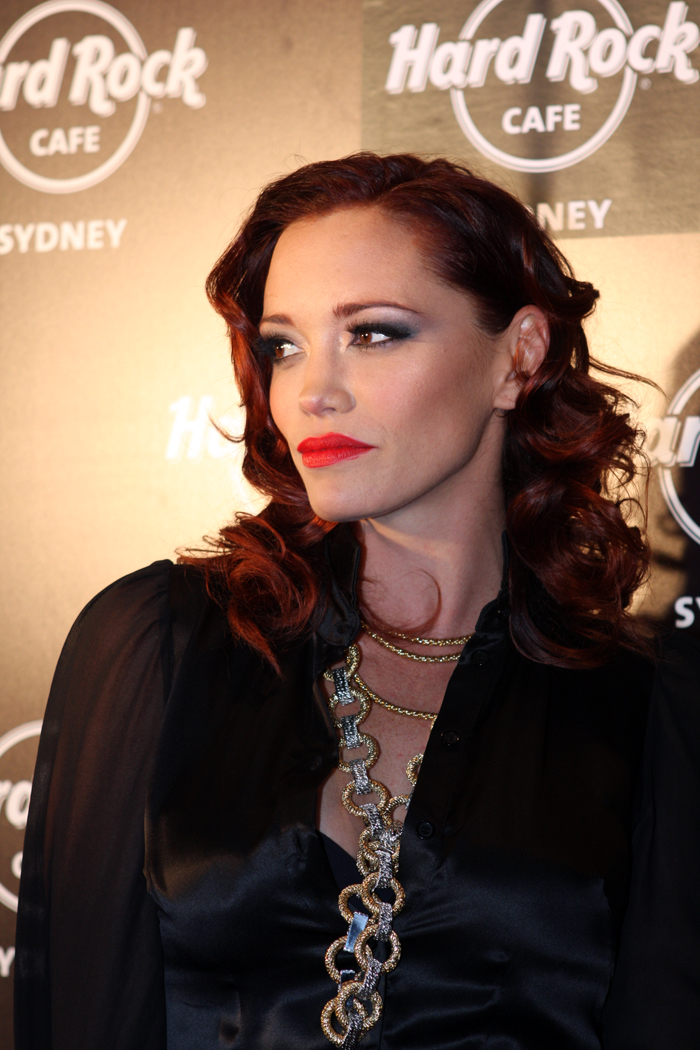
Jessica Sutta

The Pussycat Dolls reunited in November 2019 for a performance on the finale of UK reality TV competition The X Factor: Celebrity, where alongside previous singles, they also performed a new song "React". Following the performance, it was confirmed that new music was in production alongside a UK and Ireland concert tour. The tour would be the group's first since 2009's Doll Domination Tour, and "React" was the first release by the group in more than a decade. Former member, Melody Thornton decided not to reunite with them in order to focus on her solo career.

Speaking on their decision to tour the UK, Roberts told the BBC, "L.A. was our home, but the U.K. was our second home because the British just scooped us up. So, our lives ended up here as well, some of us, so the fans have just been holding on strong with wanting this reunion and our biggest fanbase is over here." In the same interview, Wyatt noted that the Pussycat Dolls had been talking about a reunion for some years, "it's been a few years in the making, and the tour was dubbed Unfinished Business, supported by comments made by both Roberts and Wyatt. Wyatt said "I think ultimately there's some unfinished business with The Pussycat Dolls" and Roberts agreed, noting that it had "been 10 years ... we just all were ready to do it". The tour was also known as the Unfinished Business Tour. As part of the tour, the group was confirmed to be headlining the second day of Fabuloso Pride in the Park, Brighton's Pride celebrations on August 2, 2020.

== Changes to scheduling ==
The Pussycat Doll Tour's first leg was supposed to begin in April 2020, visiting nine venues around the UK and Ireland, plus an appearance at Fabuloso Pride in the Park (Brighton) in August. However, by March 2020 the UK was being impacted by the COVID-19 pandemic, leading to social restrictions making the tour impossible to go ahead; new dates were planned for October. Following the same guidance regarding social restrictions, organisers of Pride in the Park announced the event was being delayed 2021, with the Pussycat Dolls returning to headline.

The tour was then scheduled to begin in July 2020 with a number of festival and racecourse events through the UK and Ireland, as well as the Untold Festival in Romania, and Superbloom Festival in Germany. The arena dates for the UK and Ireland would then follow in October, beginning with Newcastle on October 19 and ending in Dublin, Ireland on November 2. However, on July 2, 2020, the tour was confirmed to have been pushed back into 2021, with dates now spanning May and June. Other previously announced 2020 international appearances including in the Philippines, Japan, and Brazil were either postponed or cancelled all together. A third announcement came in March 2021, several months ahead of the new scheduled dates. Ticketmaster informed customers that the tour was being rescheduled once again at the request of the organisers. No new dates were announced but there was the promise of further announcements to follow in due course.

== Legal dispute and cancellation ==
"There's some fighting going on between the creator Robin and Nicole. And so I have no idea what's going to happen but I'm trying to stay optimistic. I feel like we've built such an epic moment of this comeback performance and this comeback tour and all the fans are so excited around the world right along with us."

— Wyatt during an interview with Loose Women.

In September 2021, it was reported that Scherzinger was refusing to take part in the tour and had been subsequently sued by Robin Antin, founder of the Pussycat Dolls. The media reported that Scherzinger had originally agreed to 49% of the tour's earnings but was now refusing to take part unless this rose to 75% and included overall creative control. Documents filed at the Los Angeles Superior Court found that the basis of the agreement was a Memorandum of Understanding that Scherzinger had committed to 45 shows, under terms that she would receive 32.5% of earnings from the tour, with Sutta, Roberts, Wyatt and Antin also receiving 12.5% and Bachar receiving 5%, reflecting that she left before the release of the group's second album, Doll Domination (2008). The legal dispute came from Scherzinger wanting to negotiate the terms of PCD Worldwide, a new business venture that would handle future earning from the group and brand from existing terms of 49% to an increased 75%, to reflect "opportunities she would have to forego to continue to engage in "the partnership with Antin".

Scherzinger's lawyer released a counter-statement to Antin's claims. Amongst the response was details of $600,000 advance from Live Nation that Antin had received to support the tour and now "won't or can't repay", as well as accusing her of "trading on Nicole's name without her consent" and public release of the group's financial arrangements for the tour. Scherzinger concluded that the lawsuit was "ludicrous and false", and that under those circumstances, the tour cannot happen. In January 2022, Scherzinger officially confirmed the tour's cancellation on an Instagram stories post. The official reasons cited "evolving circumstances surrounding the pandemic". Not long after, group members Sutta and Bachar confirmed that they had only learnt about the tour's cancellation from Scherzinger's Instagram post, writing their own statement, saying: "We want to say how incredibly disappointed we are to learn of an announcement made on Instagram that The Pussycat Dolls reunion tour is canceled. As of now, there has been no official notification of that." Antin also confirmed the tour's cancellation stating that "all of us have made personal & financial sacrifices" and later confirming that there were "truths to this situation" which may see the light of day one day. Despite referring to the tour cancellation as "the end of a chapter", Sutta and Bachar remained optimistic about the future of the group, stating that "[it] is not the end of the Dolls story, [we have] created a sisterhood that will live on"." Wyatt has expressed she has "done all [she] can", as she was the motivator for the reunion for years. She confirmed that both she and Roberts still want the tour to happen.

== Reception ==
When the tour was announced for April 2020, the group were only intending to play one date at The O2 Arena. However, due to strong demand an additional date was added for April 19, 2020.

== Tour dates ==
=== Arena shows ===
List of postponed concerts, showing date, city, country, venue and reason for postponement
Date	City	Country	Venue	Cancellation reason(s) (Note: All UK and Ireland arena dates were rescheduled from their original dates in April 2020 to October 2020 due to the COVID-19 pandemic. Dates were then pushed back again into April and May 2021.)	Ref.
May 9, 2020	Pasay	Philippines	Mall of Asia Arena	COVID-19 pandemic	
May 14, 2020	Osaka	Japan	Namba Hatch	COVID-19 pandemic	
May 15, 2020	Tokyo	Japan	Tokyo Garden Theatre	COVID-19 pandemic	
June 13, 2020	São Paulo	Brazil	Unimed Hall	COVID-19 pandemic	
June 16, 2020	Uberlândia	Brazil	Arena Sabiazinho	COVID-19 pandemic	
June 18, 2020	Ribeirão Preto	Brazil	Arena Eurobike	COVID-19 pandemic	
July 26, 2020	Dundee	Scotland	Slessor Gardens	COVID-19 pandemic	
May 21, 2021	Cardiff	Wales	Motorpoint Arena	COVID-19 pandemic	
May 22, 2021	Nottingham	England	Motorpoint Arena	COVID-19 pandemic	
May 23, 2021	Birmingham	England	Resorts World Arena	COVID-19 pandemic	
May 25, 2021	Leeds	England	First Direct Arena	COVID-19 pandemic	
May 26, 2021	Manchester	England	AO Arena	COVID-19 pandemic	
May 28, 2021	London	England	The O2 Arena	COVID-19 pandemic	
May 29, 2021 (Note: Before the tour was delayed due to the COVID-19 pandemic, this show was originally due to take place on April 19, 2020 but in February 2020, it was brought forward by one day due to scheduling conflicts.)	London	England	The O2 Arena	COVID-19 pandemic	
May 30, 2021	Dublin	Ireland	3Arena	COVID-19 pandemic	
June 1, 2021	Newcastle	England	Utilita Arena Newcastle	COVID-19 pandemic	
June 2, 2021	Glasgow	Scotland	SSE Hydro	COVID-19 pandemic	

=== Festival and international shows ===
List of cancelled concerts, showing date, city, country, venue and reason for cancellation
Date	City	Country	Venue	Cancellation Reason(s)	Note(s)	Ref.
April 24, 2020	Brisbane	Australia	Brisbane Entertainment Centre	COVID-19 pandemic	Part of So Pop Festival	
April 25, 2020	Sydney	Australia	Qudos Bank Arena	COVID-19 pandemic	Part of So Pop Festival	
April 28, 2020	Adelaide	Australia	Adelaide Entertainment Centre	Scheduling issues	Part of So Pop Festival	
April 29, 2020	Perth	Australia	HBF Stadium	COVID-19 pandemic	Part of So Pop Festival	
May 1, 2020 (Note: Prior to the cancellation of the So Pop Festival, the Melbourne Arena in Melbourne was originally scheduled to take place on April 30, 2020 before being rescheduled to the following day.)	Melbourne	Australia	Melbourne Arena	COVID-19 pandemic	Part of So Pop Festival	
May 2, 2020	Auckland	New Zealand	Spark Arena	COVID-19 pandemic	Part of So Pop Festival	
May 3, 2020	Christchurch	New Zealand	Horncastle Arena	COVID-19 pandemic	Part of So Pop Festival	
July 4, 2020	Llanelli	Wales	Parc y Scarlets	Scheduling issues	A suitable date could not be found for a rescheduled show	
July 5, 2020	Northampton	England	Franklin's Gardens	COVID-19 pandemic	–	
July 17, 2020	Suffolk	England	Newmarket Racecourse	COVID-19 pandemic	–	
July 18, 2020	Merseyside	England	Haydock Park Racecourse	COVID-19 pandemic	–	
July 22, 2020	Esher	England	Sandown Park Racecourse	COVID-19 pandemic	–	
July 24, 2020	York	England	York Racecourse	COVID-19 pandemic	–	
July 25, 2020	Newcastle	England	Newcastle Racecourse	COVID-19 pandemic	–	
July 30, 2020	Cluj-Napoca	Romania	Cluj Arena	COVID-19 pandemic	Part of the Untold Festival	
August 1, 2020	Lingfield	England	Lingfield Park Resort	COVID-19 pandemic	–	
August 2, 2020	Brighton	England	Preston Park	COVID-19 pandemic	Part of Fabuloso Pride in the Park	
August 21, 2020	Wolverhampton	England	Wolverhampton Racecourse	COVID-19 pandemic	–	
September 5, 2020	Munich	Germany	Olympic Park	COVID-19 pandemic	Part of the Superbloom festival	
