= Carmit Bachar =

American dancer, choreographer and singer (born 1974)

Carmit
- כרמית בכר
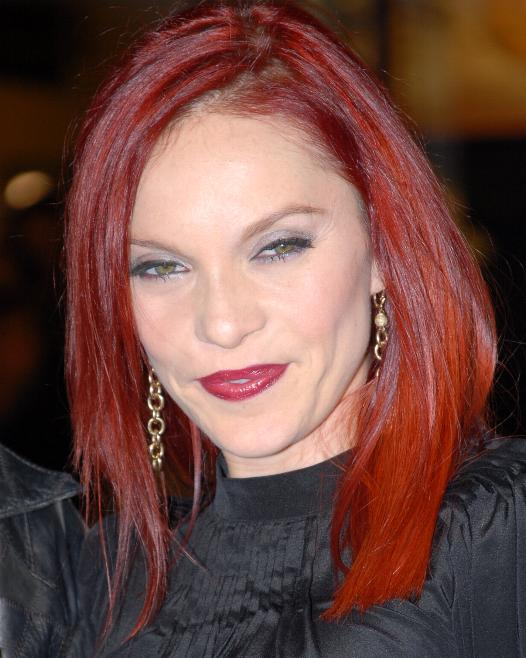
- Bachar at the premiere of 27 Dresses, 2008
- Born: Carmit Maile Bachar; September 4, 1974 (age 52); Los Angeles, California, U.S.
- Occupations: Dancer; choreographer; singer
- Years active: 1993–present
- Spouse: Kevin Whitaker (m. 2008)
- Children: 1
- Musical career
- Genres: Pop; electropop
- Label: Access
- Formerly of: The Pussycat Dolls; LadyStation
- Website: www.doll2dame.com

Carmit Maile Bachar (Hebrew: כרמית בכר; born September 4, 1974) is an American dancer, choreographer and singer. She is a former member of the pop groups the Pussycat Dolls (2003–2008, 2019–2022) and LadyStation (2011–2016). As a dancer, she has been on tour with Beyoncé, Janet Jackson, Ricky Martin and No Doubt and in music videos for various artists, such as Michael Jackson, Jennifer Lopez, the Black Eyed Peas, the Offspring, Aaliyah and Beyoncé.

== Early life ==
Bachar was born in Los Angeles, her father is of Jewish Israeli descent and her mother is of Dutch, Indonesian, and Chinese descent. She was born with a cleft lip and cleft palate. She was raised in Encino, California. Both parents were dancers; her mother worked as a dance teacher at Bancroft Middle School of Performing Arts and her father worked with Elvis Presley and Marcel Marceau. Bachar competed internationally as a rhythmic gymnast for 10 years, and placed 5th in the U.S. Olympic trials in 1992. During her career competing on the U.S. National Team, she attended Hamilton Academy of Music in Los Angeles, studying music, dance, piano and viola. But throughout the years of talent, she endured the years of cleft surgery and was also the victim of bullying.

== Career ==
=== 1993–2008: Career beginnings and the Pussycat Dolls ===
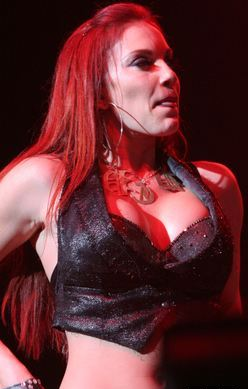
Bachar performing live in 2006

In 1993 Bachar began a successful career as dancer, appearing in television commercials and movie dance scenes, such as And the Band Played On (1993), North (1994) and Good Burger (1997). In 1995 choreographer Robin Antin asked Bachar to join her new project, the Pussycat Dolls, a burlesque dance troupe, with a repertoire of 1950s and 1960s popular music and dressed in pin-up costumes. In the following years, they performed live weekly at The Roxy Theatre, in West Hollywood, and were featured in magazines, specials for MTV and ad campaigns. During that time, she also participated on tours for Ricky Martin, No Doubt and Beyoncé, and danced in various music videos, such as Michael Jackson's "Blood on the Dance Floor", Jennifer Lopez's "Ain't It Funny", the Black Eyed Peas's "Shut Up", Aaliyah's "Rock the Boat" and Beyoncé's "Crazy in Love" and "Baby Boy".

As the Pussycat Dolls grew in popularity, music producers Jimmy Iovine and Ron Fair became involved in 2003 to transform the dance troupe into a musical group. After some reformulations and tests with singers and dancers, the musical group was formed by Nicole Scherzinger, Melody Thornton, Ashley Roberts, Kimberly Wyatt, Jessica Sutta and Bachar – the only troupe member remained in the final lineup. The group achieved worldwide success with the singles "Don't Cha", "Buttons" and Grammy Award–nominee "Stickwitu", and their multi-platinum debut album PCD (2005). Despite their commercial success, the group was plagued by internal conflict due to the emphasis on Scherzinger and the subordinate treatment of the other members, causing Bachar's departure from the group in March 2008.

=== 2008–2018: LadyStation and solo releases ===
In 2008, Bachar said that she was recording her debut solo album. On her MySpace, she uploaded two solo songs: "Overrated" and "Carmasutra". In 2009, Bachar announced that her album would be called Formerly Of... and would be released that year. The album was being produced by Grammy Awards–winner Jared Lee Gosselin and would feature songs like “Cupid”, “Love Is a Weapon”, “Me” and “Cream”. Despite this, Bachar failed to sign a record deal and the album was cancelled. Two unreleased songs, "Fierce" and "Cream", were reused on rapper Detroit Diamond's 2010 EP, with Bachar featured on three songs. In 2011 Bachar formed the electropop duo LadyStation, along with DJ Sammy J (Samantha Powell), and they released their debut single, "Body in Motion".

In the following years, they released other singles, such as "Loud", "Motivation" and "Nurse U Back to Life", and performed live at electronic music festivals and nightclubs. LadyStation's last release before disbanding in 2016 was the EP Voices on June 1, 2015. On February 24, 2017, Bachar release her debut solo single, "It's Time", as an independent artist. On April 18, 2018 she released her second single "How Far".

=== 2019–current: The Pussycat Dolls reunion and solo career ===
On November 29, 2019, the Pussycat Dolls confirmed their comeback and, on February 7, 2020, they released a new single, "React", with a live performance on the finale of The X Factor: Celebrity. They announced a 36-date world tour, but plans were canceled due the worsening situation arising from the COVID-19 pandemic and the group ended the reunion in 2021.

On May 27, 2021 she released her third single, a cover of Chris Brown's 2017 single, "Questions".

She released her first solo extended play, Carmit, on May 22, 2026. The project features previously released songs from her early solo career, as well as some unreleased songs.

== Personal life ==
Bachar married Kevin Whitaker in 2008 and they have a daughter, Keala Rose (2011).

=== Philanthropy ===
It has been reported that she wishes to form a non-profit organization called "Smile With Me": "I want to have my own charity for children and adults who are born with a cleft palate. I was born with one and I want to educate and inspire people by saying that inner beauty is more important than looks." Bachar is an ambassador of "Operation Smile", a worldwide children's medical charity that helps improve the health and lives of children and young adults born with facial deformities. In November 2007, she participated in an Operation Smile international medical mission in Bolivia, where she and her team organized creative stations for the kids like face and body painting, bookmaking, music and dance.

== Discography ==
=== With LadyStation ===
==== EPs ====
List of albums
Title	Album details
Voices	Released: July 19, 2015; Label: Self-release; Format: Digital download

==== Singles ====
Title	Year	Album
"Body in Motion"	2011	non-album singles
"Loud"	2012	non-album singles
"Motivation" (with Paul Thomas)	2012	non-album singles
"A Taste of"	2013	non-album singles
"Nurse U Back to Life"	2015	Voices

=== As solo artist ===
==== EPs ====
List of albums
Title	Album details
Limited Edition (with Detroit Diamond)	Released: March 18, 2010; Label: The Antithesis Records; Format: Digital download
Carmit	Released: May 22, 2026; Label: Gold Teeth Brigade Records; Format: Digital download
Carmit - Part II	Released: September 3, 2026; Label: Gold Teeth Brigade Records; Format: Digital download

==== Singles ====
Title	Year	Album
"It's Time"	2017	non-album singles
"How Far"	2018	non-album singles
"Questions"	2021	non-album singles
"Fierce (DVRKO remix)"	2025	Carmit - Part II
"Cream (DVRKO remix)"	2025	Carmit - Part II
"Voodoo" (with Hector Fonseca)	2025	HF25
"Body" (with Hector Fonseca)	2026	Non-album single
"Keep on Smiling"	2026	We Are Golden

As a featured artist

Title	Year	Artist
"Cali Sober"	2026	Manifesto Collection

==== Other appearances ====
Title	Year	Other artists	Album
"Marcia Baila" (backing vocals)	1998	Ricky Martin	Vuelve
"Lo-Down"	2008	Storm Lee	Soulfillapopkilla
"Something 'Bout You"	2010	Detroit Diamond	Limited Edition
"Cream"	2010	—N/a	Limited Edition
"Fierce"	2010	—N/a	Limited Edition

== Filmography ==
Unreferenced section

=== Film ===
Year	Title	Role
1993	And the Band Played On	Dancer
1994	North	Dancer
1997	Good Burger	Dancer
1998	Living Out Loud	Dancer
2002	The Hot Chick	Dancer
2003	Charlie's Angels 2	Dancer
2004	Along Came Polly	Dancer
2004	13 Going on 30	Dancer
2017	Cherry Pop	Kelly Smith

=== Television ===
Year	Title	Role	Notes
1996	Red Shoe Diaries	Dancer	Episode: "The Forbidden Zone"
2001	Nikki	Dancer	Episode: "Milli Vanikki"
2008–2009	Dancing with the Stars	Herself	Guest performer; Seasons 7 and 9
2022	Winning Time: The Rise of the Lakers Dynasty	Horn Nightclub Singer	Episode: “The Swan”
2024	Palm Royale	Beautiful Woman	Episode: “Pilot”

=== Music videos ===
- Appearances in music videos as a dancer

Year	Song	Artist
1997	"Blood on the Dancefloor"	Michael Jackson
1998	"Too Close"	Next
1998	"One Week"	Barenaked Ladies
1999	"Pretty Fly (For a White Guy)"	The Offspring
1999	"Why Don't You Get a Job?"	The Offspring
1999	"Take Me There"	Blackstreet and Mýa
1999	"You Need a Man"	Shanice
1999	"Every Morning"	Sugar Ray
1999	"All n My Grill"	Missy Elliott
2000	"You're an Ocean"	Fastball
2000	"Bathwater"	No Doubt
2001	"Perfect Gentleman"	Wyclef Jean
2001	"Ain't It Funny"	Jennifer Lopez
2001	"Rock the Boat"	Aaliyah
2001	"Sexual Revolution"	Macy Gray
2001	"Hey Baby"	No Doubt
2002	"Freeek!"	George Michael
2003	"Crazy In Love"	Beyoncé
2003	"Baby Boy"	Beyoncé
2003	"Shut Up"	The Black Eyed Peas
2006	"Friend"	Scarlett
2009	"Snap, Crackle, Pop"	Chonique Sneed
2010	"Nancy Lee"	Vintage Trouble

== Concert tours ==
Tours where Bachar was a dancer:

- Livin' la Vida Loca Tour – Ricky Martin (2000)
- All for You Tour – Janet Jackson (2001)
- Rock Steady Tour – No Doubt (2003)
- Dangerously in Love Tour – Beyoncé (2003)

Other events

- Janet Jackson's Super Bowl half-time show (2004)

== Awards and nominations ==
Ceremony	Year	Award	Work	Result	Ref.
Grammy Awards	2007	Best Pop Performance by a Duo or Group with Vocals	"Stickwitu"	Nominated	
