= List of songs recorded by the Pussycat Dolls =

American girl group the Pussycat Dolls have recorded songs for two studio albums, and have collaborated with other artists for featured songs on their respective albums. Originally a burlesque cabaret act, the Pussycat Dolls transformed into a recording act under the supervision of Robin Antin and then-A&M Records president and producer Ron Fair. After recruiting lead singer Nicole Scherzinger, they began to work with Fair who executive produced their 2005 debut album, PCD. The album contains 12 songs of which the majority was co-produced by Fair and Tal Herzberg. The most part of the album contains original songs produced by Cee Lo Green, will.i.am, Timbaland, Rich Harrison. It also includes cover versions of songs by Donna Summer, the Supremes and Soft Cell.

Their second and currently final album Doll Domination was released on September 19, 2008. Several songs on the album were originally recorded for Scherzinger's debut solo album, Her Name is Nicole, which was eventually shelved. They were then reworked for the group. In 2020, the group reformed as a five-piece, after member Melody Thornton chose not to return. They released a collaboration with Meghan Trainor as well as the single "React", but plans for more music were canceled due to the COVID-19 pandemic. In 2026, they reformed as a trio, with members Scherzinger, Ashley Roberts and Kimberly Wyatt, and released the song "Club Song".

== List of songs ==
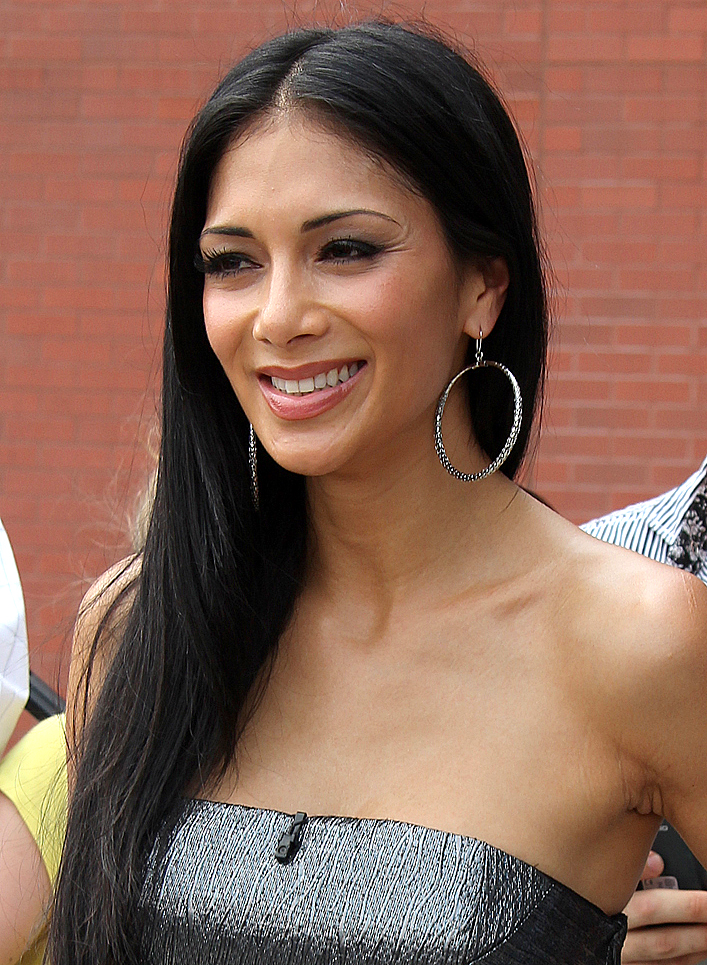
Lead singer Nicole Scherzinger is the only member that is credited as a songwriter on both albums. She was later billed as a featured artist on "Jai Ho! (You Are My Destiny)" and "Hush Hush; Hush Hush" which caused controversy and led to an internal strife within the group.

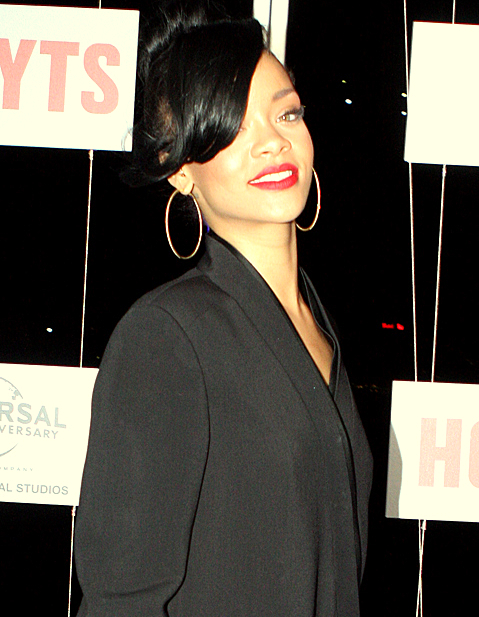
"Bad Girl" was initially recorded by Barbadian recording artist Rihanna and American recording artist Chris Brown for the soundtrack of the film Confessions of a Shopaholic (2009), but was excluded in favor of The Pussycat Dolls.

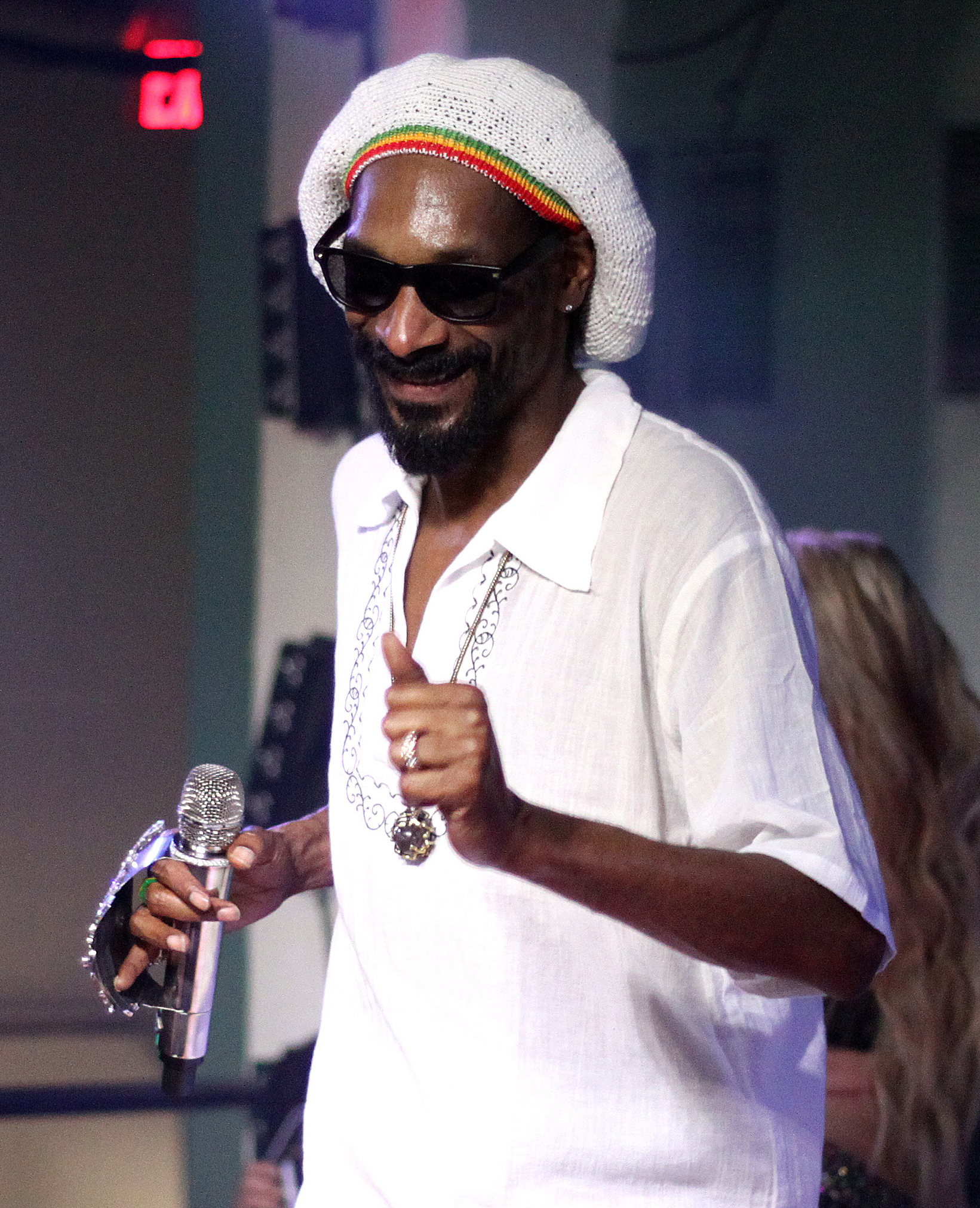
Snoop Dogg co-wrote "Buttons", on which he appears as a featured vocalist.

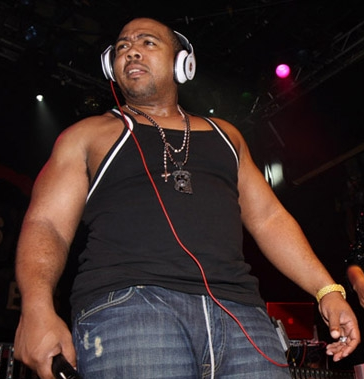
Timbaland (pictured) and Keri Hilson co-wrote "Wait a Minute", in which he appears as a featured artist. He has also contributed to several songs on their sophomore album.

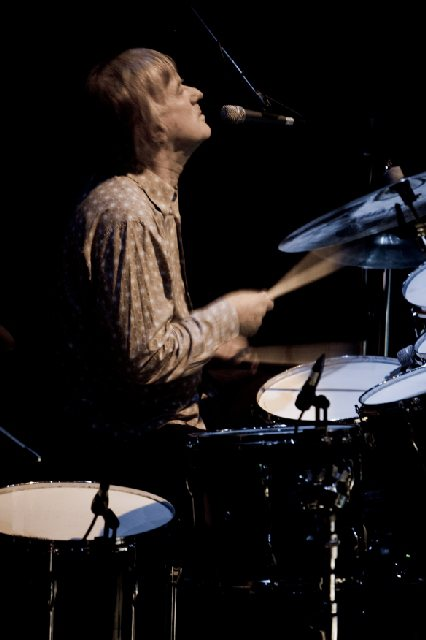
"When I Grow Up" contains a sample of the main riff of the Yardbirds' song "He's Always There". Due to the inclusion of the sample, the Yardbirds' drummer Jim McCarty (pictured) and bassist Paul Samwell-Smith received co-writing credits for the song.

Key
†	Indicates single release

List of songs recorded by The Pussycat Dolls
Song	Artist(s)	Writer(s)	Album(s)	Year	Ref.
"All I Ever Wanted"	The Pussycat Dolls	Sam Watters; Louis Biancaniello; Dameon Aranda	—N/a	—N/a	
"Bad Girl"	The Pussycat Dolls	Chris Brown; Darnell Dalton; Eric Florence; Ester Dean; Jamal Jones; Lamar Raynard Taylor	Confessions of a Shopaholic	2009	
"Beep" †	The Pussycat Dolls featuring will.i.am	William Adams; Kara DioGuardi; Jeff Lynne	PCD	2005	
"Bite the Dust"	The Pussycat Dolls	Keri Hilson; Kwamé Holland	PCD	2005	
"Bottle Pop" †	The Pussycat Dolls featuring Snoop Dogg	Sean Garrett; Fernando Garibay; Nicole Scherzinger	Doll Domination	2008	
"Buttons"	The Pussycat Dolls	Sean Garrett; Jamal Jones; Jason Perry; Nicole Scherzinger	PCD	2005	
"Buttons" † (Final Edit Version)	The Pussycat Dolls featuring Snoop Dogg	Jamal Jones; Jason Perry; Nicole Scherzinger; Calvin Broadus	PCD: Tour Edition	2005	
"Calling All Angels"	The Pussycat Dolls	Sam Watters; Louis Biancaniello; Rico Love; Wayne Wilkins	—N/a	—N/a	
"Club Song" †	The Pussycat Dolls	Nicole Scherzinger; Mike Sabath; Caroline Ailin; Solly	TBA	2026	
"Cute as Shit"	The Pussycat Dolls	Wayne Lucas	—N/a	—N/a	
"Don't Cha" †	The Pussycat Dolls featuring Busta Rhymes	Thomas Callaway; Trevor Smith; Anthony Ray	PCD	2005	
"Don't Cha" (More Booty Remix)	The Pussycat Dolls featuring Busta Rhymes	Thomas Callaway; Trevor Smith; Anthony Ray	PCD: Tour Edition	2006	
"Edge of the Earth"	The Pussycat Dolls	Louis Biancaniello; Karen Poole; Sam Watters	—N/a	—N/a	
"Elevator"	The Pussycat Dolls	Rodney Jerkins; Crystal Johnson; Stefani Germanotta	Doll Domination	2008	
"Feeling Good"	The Pussycat Dolls	Leslie Bricusse; Anthony Newley	PCD	2005	
"Flirt"	The Pussycat Dolls	Kara DioGuardi; Nicole Scherzinger; Greg Wells	PCD	2005	
"Genetics"	Meghan Trainor featuring The Pussycat Dolls	Meghan Trainor; Ryan Trainor; Justin Tranter; Mike Sabath	Treat Myself	2020	
"Glamour Girl"	The Pussycat Dolls	Stephen Garrett; Scott Storch	—N/a	—N/a	
"Grown Man"	New Kids on the Block featuring The Pussycat Dolls and Teddy Riley	Adida Kavarro; Allen Toussaint; Don Covay; Deja Riley; Richard Stanard; Tyler Thurmond	The Block	2008	
"Halo"	The Pussycat Dolls	Timothy Mosley; Jerome Harmon; Ezekiel Lewis; Balewa Muhammad; Patrick "J.Que" Smith; Candice Nelson	Doll Domination	2008	
"Happily Never After"	The Pussycat Dolls	Shaffer Smith; Shea Taylor	Doll Domination	2008	
"Here for You"	The Pussycat Dolls	Stephen Garrett; Scott Storch	—N/a	—N/a	
"Hot Stuff (I Want You Back)"	The Pussycat Dolls	Pete Bellotte; Harold Faltermeyer; Keith Forsey; Siobhan Fahey; Clare Kenny; Steven Gallifent; Will Blanchard	PCD	2005	
"How Many Times, How Many Lies"	The Pussycat Dolls	Diane Warren	PCD	2005	
"Hush Hush"	The Pussycat Dolls	Andreas Romdhane; Josef Larossi; Ina Wroldsen; Nicole Scherzinger	Doll Domination	2008	
"Hush Hush; Hush Hush" †	The Pussycat Dolls	Andreas Romdhane; Josef Larossi; Ina Wroldsen; Nicole Scherzinger; Dino Fekaris; Frederik Perren	Doll Domination	2009	
"I Don't Need a Man" †	The Pussycat Dolls	Rich Harrison; Nicole Scherzinger; Kara DioGuardi	PCD	2005	
"I Hate This Part" †	The Pussycat Dolls	Wayne Hector; Lucas Secon; Jonas Jeberg; Mich Hansen	Doll Domination	2008	
"In Person"	The Pussycat Dolls	Timothy Mosley; Jerome Harmon; Ezekiel Lewis; Balewa Muhammad; Patrick "J.Que" Smith; Candice Nelson	Doll Domination	2008	
"I'm Done"	The Pussycat Dolls	Stefanie Ridel; Tommy James; Ashlynne Huff	Doll Domination	2008	
"It's on Tonight"	The Pussycat Dolls	Stephen Garrett; Scott Storch	—N/a	—N/a	
"Jai Ho! (You Are My Destiny)" †	A. R. Rahman & The Pussycat Dolls featuring Nicole Scherzinger	Nicole Scherzinger; Ester Dean; Ron Fair; Evan Bogart; Erika Nuri; David Quiñones; Nailah Thorbourne; Nyanda Thorbourne; Candace Thorbourne	Doll Domination	2009	
"Just Say Yes"	The Pussycat Dolls	Garrett Lee; Gary Lightbody	—N/a	—N/a	
"Keep It Movin'"	The Pussycat Dolls	Stephen Garrett; Scott Storch	—N/a	—N/a	
"Let It Go"	The Pussycat Dolls	Gregory Bruno; Miriam Makeba; Mark Rooney; Daniel Shea	—N/a	—N/a	
"Lick My Lips"	The Pussycat Dolls	Jevon Hill; Theron Thomas; Timothy Thomas	—N/a	—N/a	
"Lights, Camera, Action"	The Pussycat Dolls featuring New Kids on the Block	Jamal Jones; Brian Kennedy; Cornell Haynes; Jasper Cameron; Lloyd Politte	Doll Domination	2008	
"Love the Way You Love Me"	The Pussycat Dolls	Chauncey Hollis; Jesse Woodard; Kara DioGuardi; Kasia Livingston	Doll Domination	2008	
"Magic"	The Pussycat Dolls	Timothy Mosley; Jerome Harmon; Ezekiel Lewis; Balewa Muhammad; Patrick "J.Que" Smith; Candice Nelson	Doll Domination	2008	
"Mr. Operator"	The Pussycat Dolls	Stephen Garrett; Unknown	—N/a	—N/a	
"My Ambition"	The Pussycat Dolls	Bruno Gregory; Miriam Makeba; Mark Rooney	—N/a	—N/a	
"Out of This Club" †	The Pussycat Dolls featuring R. Kelly and Polow da Don	R. Kelly; Jamal Jones	Doll Domination	2008	
"Painted Windows"	The Pussycat Dolls	Rodney Jerkins; Osinachi Nwaneri; Kaleena Harper; Crystal Johnson	Doll Domination	2009	
"Perhaps, Perhaps, Perhaps"	The Pussycat Dolls	Osvaldo Farrés; Joe Davis	Doll Domination	2008	
"Pin Up Girl"	The Pussycat Dolls	Jamie Hartman; Vicky Karagiorgos; Erick Morillo; Jose Nunez; Harry Romero; Jessica Sutta	—N/a	—N/a	
"Purrr"	The Pussycat Dolls	Jevon Hill; Theron Thomas; Timothy Thomas	—N/a	—N/a	
"React" †	The Pussycat Dolls	Nicole Scherzinger; Georgia Buchanan; Johan Gustafsson; William "Simms" Simister; Hannah Wilson	—N/a	2020	
"Right Now"	The Pussycat Dolls	Herbie Mann; Carl Sigman	PCD	2005	
"Right Now" (NBA Version)	The Pussycat Dolls	Herbie Mann; Carl Sigman	Promotional release only	2005	
"Santa Baby"	The Pussycat Dolls	Joan Javits; Philip Springer; Tony Springer	Now That's What I Call Christmas! 3, Stickwitu (single)	2006	
"Show Me What You Got"	The Pussycat Dolls	Nicole Scherzinger; Jamal Jones	Live from London	2006	
"Space"	The Pussycat Dolls	Andrew Frampton; Jack Kugelln; Jamie Jones; Jason Pennock	Doll Domination	2009	
"Stickwitu" †	The Pussycat Dolls	Franne Golde; Kasia Livingston; Robert Palmer	PCD	2005	
"Stickwitu" † (Avant Remix)	The Pussycat Dolls featuring Avant	Franne Golde; Kasia Livingston; Robert Palmer	PCD: Tour Edition	2006	
"Streetlife"	The Pussycat Dolls	Stephen Garrett; Scott Storch	—N/a	—N/a	
"Sway" †	The Pussycat Dolls	Pablo Beltran Ruiz; Norman Gimbel	Shall We Dance?	2004	
"Ta-ta"	The Pussycat Dolls	Stephen Garrett; Unknown	—N/a	—N/a	
"Tainted Love/Where Did Our Love Go"	The Pussycat Dolls	Leslie Bricusse; Anthony Newley; Lamont Dozier; Eddie Holland	PCD	2005	
"Takin' Over the World"	The Pussycat Dolls	Jesse Woodard; Tiffany Gouche; Davion Faris; Danniel Farris; Myles Sims; Emmanuell Chisolm; Daniel Groover	Doll Domination	2008	
"Too Woman"	The Pussycat Dolls	Stephen Garrett; Unknown	—N/a	—N/a	
"Top of the World"	The Pussycat Dolls	Evan Bogart; Erika Nuri; David Quiñones; Calvin Cenon	Doll Domination	2009	
"U Don't Own Me"	The Pussycat Dolls	Stephen Garrett; Unknown	—N/a	—N/a	
"Wait a Minute" †	The Pussycat Dolls featuring Timbaland	Timothy Mosley; Keri Hilson	PCD	2005	
"We Went as Far as We Felt Like Going"	The Pussycat Dolls	Bob Crewe; Kenny Nolan; Harold Clayton; Sigidi	Shark Tale; I Don't Need a Man (single)	2004	
"Whatchamacallit"	The Pussycat Dolls	Timothy Mosley; Jerome Harmon; Ezekiel Lewis; Balewa Muhammad; Patrick "J.Que" Smith; Candice Nelson	Doll Domination	2008	
"Whatcha Think About That" †	The Pussycat Dolls featuring Missy Elliott	Jamal Jones; Ester Dean; Melissa Elliott; Mickael Furnon	Doll Domination	2008	
"Whatever Happens"	The Pussycat Dolls	Louis Biancaniello; Ryan Tedder; Sam Watters	—N/a	—N/a	
"When I Grow Up" †	The Pussycat Dolls	Rodney Jerkins; Theron Thomas; Timothy Thomas; Jim McCarty; Paul Samwell-Smith	Doll Domination	2008	
"Who's Gonna Love You"	The Pussycat Dolls	Nicole Scherzinger; Jamal Jones; Kara DioGuardi	Doll Domination	2008	
"Why Would I Ever"	The Pussycat Dolls	Louis Biancaniello; Michael Mani; Jordan Omley; Sam Watters	—N/a	—N/a	

== See also ==
- The Pussycat Dolls discography
