= The Pussycat Dolls discography =

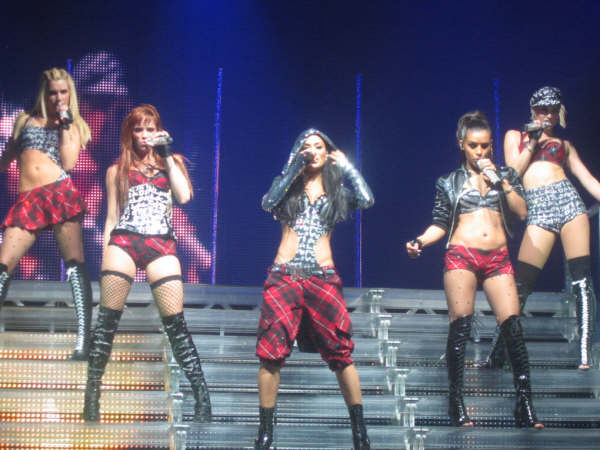
- The Pussycat Dolls performing "Buttons" during the Doll Domination Tour, 2009
- Studio albums: 2
- Extended plays: 3
- Singles: 15
- Video albums: 2
- Music videos: 15
- Reissued albums: 3
- Remix albums: 1

The discography of American girl group the Pussycat Dolls consists of two studio albums, three extended plays, two video albums, 15 singles, two promotional singles, three reissued albums, one remix album and 15 music videos. To date, the group has sold 15 million albums and 40 million singles worldwide.

In 2003, Robin Antin struck a joint venture with Interscope Records to develop the Pussycat Dolls into a recording group. In 2004, the group made their musical debut by releasing a cover of "Sway" for the soundtrack of the film Shall We Dance?.

Their self-titled debut album was released in September 2005 and it peaked at number five on the Billboard 200. It earned a four times platinum certification in the United States by the Recording Industry Association of America (RIAA), 3× Platinum in Australia by the Australian Recording Industry Association (ARIA), and 4× Platinum in the United Kingdom by the British Phonographic Industry (BPI). The album's lead single, "Don't Cha", peaked atop the charts in 15 countries and reached number two on the Billboard Hot 100 and was certified platinum by the RIAA. Its follow-up singles, "Stickwitu" and "Buttons", were also a commercial success peaking in the top five on charts worldwide. After the success of their debut album, the Pussycat Dolls released their first video album, PCD Live from London, in 2006 to coincide with the group's headlining world tour. As of 2008, PCD has sold nearly three million copies in the United States. and sold a total of 9 million worldwide.

After a three-year hiatus in hopes to further Scherzinger's own solo career, the group reunited to release their second and final studio album, Doll Domination, in September 2008. Scherzinger began to receive a larger input in the recording process as co-writer and co-producer of the album. Doll Domination garnered a higher peak position than PCD of number four on Billboard 200, but failed to match its predecessor's commercial success. Its lead single, "When I Grow Up", became another top ten single for the group. "I Hate This Part" was released as the second single and managed to attain similar success. In early 2009, Doll Domination was re-released as two compilation albums. The lead single from Doll Domination 2.0 was "Jai Ho! (You Are My Destiny)", which reached number one in seven countries. The follow-up single, "Hush Hush; Hush Hush", reached the top 20 worldwide. In 2010, the original recording group line-up disbanded.

A 20th anniversary reissue of their debut album, titled PCD Forever, was released on May 6, 2026, along with a re-release of Doll Domination. A remix album titled, PCD (Remixed), was released on April 17, 2026.

== Studio albums ==
List of studio albums, with selected chart positions, sales figures, and certifications
Title	Album details	Peak chart positions										Sales	Certifications
Title	Album details	US	AUS	BEL (FL)	CAN	FRA	GER	IRE	NZ	SWI	UK	Sales	Certifications
PCD	Released: September 12, 2005; Label: A&M; Formats: CD, LP, digital download	5	8	5	11	23	8	7	1	9	7	US: 2,900,000 (Note: United States sales figures for PCD as of September 2008.); NZ: 30,000 (Note: As of May 2009, PCD sold more than 30,000 copies in New Zealand.); UK: 1,300,000 (Note: United Kingdom sales figures for PCD as of June 2019.)	RIAA: 4× Platinum; ARIA: 3× Platinum; BEA: Platinum; BPI: 4× Platinum; BVMI: 2× Platinum; IFPI SWI: Gold; IRMA: 2× Platinum; MC: 2× Platinum; RMNZ: 4× Platinum; SNEP: Gold
Doll Domination	Released: September 19, 2008; Label: Interscope; Formats: CD, digital download	4	4	17	3	16	10	6	8	7	4	US: 400,000 (Note: As of April 2009, Doll Domination sold less than 400,000 copies in the United States.); NZ: 6,000 (Note: New Zealand sales figures for Doll Domination as of May 2009.); UK: 300,000 (Note: United Kingdom sales figures for Doll Domination as of June 2023.)	ARIA: Platinum; BEA: Gold; BPI: Platinum; BVMI: Gold; IFPI SWI: Gold; IRMA: Platinum; MC: Platinum; RMNZ: Platinum; SNEP: Gold

=== Reissues ===
List of reissues, with selected chart positions and certifications
Title	Album details	Peaks		Certifications
Title	Album details	AUS	AUS URB	Certifications
Doll Domination 2.0	Released: April 24, 2009 (AUS); Label: Universal Music; Formats: Digital download	8	2	ARIA: Platinum (Note: In Australia, Doll Domination 2.0 was combined with the original chart entry for Doll Domination, and thus re-entered the chart as one release.)
Doll Domination 3.0	Released: August 10, 2009 (UK); Label: Polydor; Formats: CD, digital download	—	—	
PCD Forever	Released: May 6, 2026; Label: A&M; Formats: CD, digital download	—	—	
"—" denotes a title that did not chart, or was not released in that territory.

=== Remix albums ===
List of remix albums
Title	Album details
PCD (Remixed)	Released: April 17, 2026; Label: A&M; Format: Digital download

== Video albums ==
List of video albums, with selected chart positions, and certifications
Title	Album details	Peak chart positions					Certifications
Title	Album details	US	AUS	JPN	NLD	UK	Certifications
PCD Live from London	Released: December 1, 2006 (GER); Label: A&M, Universal Music; Formats: DVD	12	12	252	26	24	ARIA: Platinum
The Pussycat Dolls: Live from Control Room	Released: April 6, 2007 (US); Label: A&M; Formats: Digital download	—	—	—	—	—	
"—" denotes a title that did not chart, or was not released in that territory.

== Extended plays ==
List of extended plays, with selected chart positions, sales figures, and certifications
Title	Extended play details	Peaks		Sales	Certifications
Title	Extended play details	CAN	UK	Sales	Certifications
Sessions@AOL	Released: July 4, 2006 (US); Label: A&M; Formats: Digital download	—	—		
Doll Domination – The Mini Collection	Released: April 24, 2009 (IRE); Label: Polydor; Formats: CD, digital download	58	9	UK: 70,000 (Note: United Kingdom sales figures for Doll Domination – The Mini Collection as of June 2009.)	BPI: Gold
Celebrating Pride: The Pussycat Dolls	Released May 28, 2022; Label: Universal Music; Formats: Digital download, streaming	—	—		
"—" denotes a title that did not chart, or was not released in that territory.

== Singles ==
List of singles, with selected chart positions and certifications, showing year released as single, and album name
Title	Year	Peak chart positions										Sales	Certifications	Album
Title	Year	US	AUS	BEL (FL)	CAN	FRA	GER	IRE	NZ	SWI	UK	Sales	Certifications	Album
"Don't Cha" (featuring Busta Rhymes)	2005	2	1	1	1	6	1	1	1	1	1	FRA: 157,979 (Note: France sales figures for "Don't Cha" as of December 2009.); UK: 1,580,000	RIAA: 5× Platinum; ARIA: 2× Platinum; BPI: 2× Platinum; BVMI: 2× Platinum; IFPI SWI: Gold; RMNZ: 4× Platinum	PCD
"Stickwitu"	2005	5	2	5	3	17	11	2	1	6	1	FRA: 52,999 (Note: France sales figures for "Stickwitu" as of December 2009.); UK: 677,000	RIAA: 3× Platinum; ARIA: Platinum; BPI: Platinum; RMNZ: 2× Platinum	PCD
"Beep" (featuring will.i.am)	2006	13	3	1	5	10	5	2	1	6	2	FRA: 94,755 (Note: France sales figures for "Beep" as of December 2009.)	RIAA: Platinum; ARIA: Gold; BPI: Gold; BVMI: Gold; RMNZ: Gold	PCD
"Buttons" (featuring Snoop Dogg)	2006	3	2	4	5	12	4	4	1	3	3	FRA: 60,833 (Note: France sales figures for "Buttons" as of December 2009.); UK: 836,000	RIAA: 5× Platinum; ARIA: Platinum; BEA: Gold; BPI: Platinum; BVMI: Gold; RMNZ: 2× Platinum	PCD
"I Don't Need a Man"	2006	93	6	7	67	12	20	9	7	15	7	FRA: 33,990 (Note: France sales figures for "I Don't Need a Man" as of December 2009.)	ARIA: Gold; BPI: Silver	PCD
"Wait a Minute" (featuring Timbaland)	2006	28	16	18	24	—	27	—	24	41	108		RIAA: Platinum	PCD
"When I Grow Up"	2008	9	2	3	3	2	7	2	5	10	3	FRA: 113,909 (Note: France sales figures for "When I Grow Up" as of December 2009.); UK: 792,000	ARIA: Platinum; BPI: Platinum; BVMI: Gold; RMNZ: Platinum	Doll Domination
"Out of This Club" (featuring R. Kelly and Polow da Don)	2008	— (Note: "Out of This Club" did not enter the Billboard Hot 100, but peaked at number four on the Bubbling Under R&B/Hip-Hop Singles chart.)	—	—	—	—	—	—	—	—	—			Doll Domination
"Whatcha Think About That" (featuring Missy Elliott)	2008	— (Note: "Whatcha Think About That" did not enter the Billboard Hot 100, but peaked at number eight on the Bubbling Under Hot 100 Singles chart, which acts as a 25-song extension to the Hot 100.)	—	—	—	—	—	—	12	—	9		BPI: Silver	Doll Domination
"I Hate This Part"	2008	11	10	5	5	3	12	9	9	9	12	FRA: 169,550 (Note: France sales figures for "I Hate This Part" as of December 2009.)	RIAA: Platinum; ARIA: Gold; BPI: Gold; BEA: Gold; RMNZ: Gold	Doll Domination
"Jai Ho! (You Are My Destiny)" (with A. R. Rahman)	2009	15	1	3	4	3	29	1	2	7	3	FRA: 105,508 (Note: France sales figures for "Jai Ho" as of December 2009.); UK: 1,000,000	ARIA: 4× Platinum; BPI: Platinum; RMNZ: Platinum	Doll Domination
"Bottle Pop"	2009	— (Note: "Bottle Pop" did not enter the Billboard Hot 100, but peaked at number one on the Hot Dance Club Songs chart.)	17	— (Note: "Bottle Pop" did not enter the Ultratop 50, but peaked at number nine on the Flemish Ultratip chart.)	88	—	—	—	17	—	—			Doll Domination
"Hush Hush; Hush Hush"	2009	73	10	6	41	5	44	13	—	30	17	FRA: 67,212 (Note: France sales figures for "Hush Hush, Hush Hush" as of December 2009.)	ARIA: Gold; BPI: Silver	Doll Domination
"React"	2020	— (Note: "React" did not enter the Billboard Hot 100, but peaked at number 12 on the Digital Songs Sales chart.)	— (Note: "React" did not enter the ARIA Top 50 Singles Chart, but peaked at number 10 on the ARIA Digital Track Chart.)	—	— (Note: "React" did not enter the Billboard Canadian Hot 100, but peaked at number 12 on the Hot Canadian Digital Song Sales chart.)	—	—	23	— (Note: "React" did not enter the NZ Top 40 Singles Chart, but peaked at number 19 on the NZ Hot Singles Chart.)	75	29		ARIA: Gold; BPI: Silver	Non-album singles
"Club Song"	2026	—	—	—	—	—	—	—	— (Note: "Club Song" did not enter the NZ Top 40 Singles Chart, but peaked at number 31 on the NZ Hot Singles Chart.)	—	— (Note: "Club Song" did not enter the UK Singles Chart Top 100, but debuted at number 25 on the UK Singles Downloads Chart, peaking one week later at number 10 on that chart.)			Non-album singles
"—" denotes a title that did not chart, or was not released in that territory.

=== Promotional singles ===
List of singles, with selected chart positions
Title	Year	Peak chart positions		Album
Title	Year	US	CAN	Album
"Sway"	2004	—	—	Shall We Dance?
"Right Now" (NBA version)	2005	—	—	PCD
"Top of the World"	2009	79	53	Doll Domination

== Other charted songs ==
List of songs, with selected chart positions
Title	Year	Peaks	Album
Title	Year	US Jazz	Album
"Feelin' Good"	2006	23	PCD

== Other appearances ==
List of non-single guest appearances, with other performing artists, showing year released and album name
Title	Year	Other performer(s)	Album	Ref.
"We Went as Far as We Felt Like Going"	2004	—N/a	Shark Tale	
"Grown Man"	2008	New Kids on the Block; Teddy Riley	The Block	
"Bad Girl"	2009	—N/a	Confessions of a Shopaholic	
"Genetics"	2020	Meghan Trainor	Treat Myself	

== Music videos ==
List of music videos, showing year released, and directors
Title	Year	Other performers	Director(s)	Ref.
"Sway"	2004	—N/a	Steve Antin	
"Don't Cha"	2005	Busta Rhymes	Paul Hunter	
"Stickwitu"	2005	—N/a	Nigel Dick	
"Beep"	2005	will.i.am	Benny Boom	
"Buttons"	2006	Snoop Dogg	Francis Lawrence	
"I Don't Need a Man"	2006	—N/a	Chris Applebaum	
"Wait a Minute"	2006	Timbaland	Marc Webb	
"When I Grow Up"	2008	—N/a	Joseph Kahn	
"Whatcha Think About That"	2008	Missy Elliott	Diane Martel	
"I Hate This Part"	2008	—N/a	Joseph Kahn	
"Bottle Pop"	2009	—N/a	Thomas Kloss	
"Jai Ho! (You Are My Destiny)"	2009	A. R. Rahman; Nicole Scherzinger	Thomas Kloss	
"Hush Hush; Hush Hush"	2009	—N/a	Rich Lee	
"React"	2020	—N/a	Bradley and Pablo	
"Santa Baby"	2020	—N/a	Hans Carrillo	
