= Tori Alamaze =

American singer

- Born: July 7, 1977 (age 47); Detroit, Michigan, US
- Occupations: Singer; backing vocalist

Tori Alamaze (born July 7, 1977) is an American singer best known as a backing vocalist for the hip hop duo OutKast.

Hailing from Detroit, Alamaze worked as a make-up artist for about 10 years, including work for musicians Faith Evans, Erykah Badu, TLC, Xscape, Monica, Outkast, and Busta Rhymes. After her first recording deal, she worked in the studio on her debut album and opened for The Black Eyed Peas.

Alamaze was briefly signed to Universal Records as a solo artist. Her first single, "Don't Cha" (2004), was written and produced by Cee-Lo Green. After mediocre national success, only peaking at No. 53 on the Billboard R&B Singles Chart, Alamaze's label dropped her, and the track was re-recorded by The Pussycat Dolls including a rap from Busta Rhymes. The new version climbed to No. 2 on the Billboard Hot 100 and the Club mix version peaked at No. 1 on the Hot Dance Music/Club Play chart.

== Discography ==
- Magick, Blessings & Bullsht Vol. 2 (2022)
- Magick, Blessings & Bullsht Vol. 1 (2021)

=== Singles ===
| Single | Year | Peak chart positions | | | | Album |
| Single | Year | US | US R&B/ HH | US Rhyth. | US Sales | Album |
|---|---|---|---|---|---|---|
| "Don't Cha" | 2004 | — (Note: "Don't Cha" failed to chart on the Billboard Hot 100 chart, but reached number two on its Bubbling Under Hot 100 extension.) | 53 | 20 | 4 | Non-album singles |
| "Control" (featuring Mobb Deep) | 2004 | — | — | — | — | Non-album singles |
"—" denotes a recording that did not chart or was not released in that territory.
