= PCD Live from London =

Video by the Pussycat Dolls
- Released: December 1, 2006
- Recorded: June 26, 2006
- Venues: Windsor Racecourse (London, UK)
- Label: A&M
- Directors: Jeff Gripe; Ginger Ramsey-Grippe

The Pussycat Dolls chronology
PCD (2005)	PCD Live from London (2006)	Doll Domination (2008)

PCD Live from London is the first video album by American girl group the Pussycat Dolls. It was directed by Jeff Gripe and Ginger Ramsey-Grippe, and was executively produced by Ron Fair and Jimmy Iovine. It was first released on December 1, 2006, by A&M Records. The DVD features their concert at Windsor Racecourse in London, United Kingdom, as part of the Vodafone TBA secret gigs. It also features six music videos, backstage footage and candid interviews with each member.

Live from London debuted within the top twenty on three national music video charts. The DVD was certified platinum by the Australian Recording Industry Association and Music Canada. It was also certified gold by the Brazilian Association of Record Producers and the Recording Industry Association of New Zealand.

== Background and development ==
Live from London was filmed at Windsor Racecourse, London, as part of the Vodafone secret gigs. Most of the songs on Live from London originate from their debut album PCD, but it also contains an interlude titled "Show Me What You Got", which was written by Nicole Scherzinger and Polow da Don where they engage in a sing-song dance game whilst individually introducing themselves and their talents at hand.

== Reception ==
People magazine contributors Chuck Arnold and Ivory Jeff Clinton wrote that the Pussycat Dolls "[push] all the right buttons" and described the live performance as "fun" and "frivolous." On the contrary, Tony Clayton-Lea of the Irish Times wrote that the group come as "trailer-trash cousins" in comparison to fellow girl groups, Sugababes and Girls Aloud. He continued writing that the Pussycat Dolls are about fulfilling male fantasies with "push-up bras, stilettos and various other accouterments." He criticized the live performance for being "tatty, amateur and, questionably, overtly sexually provocative." However, Clayton-Lea praised the group's catalog, highlighting "Stickwitu" "as one of the best pop ballads of recent years."

In the United States, PCD Live from London debuted and peaked at number 12 on the Music Video Sales chart on December 23, 2006. It spent a total of 12 weeks on the chart. On the ARIA Top 40 Music DVDs chart in Australia, the DVD debuted at number 13 on the week commencing December 11, 2006. It remained in the top 40 for 22 non-consecutive weeks, before reappearing in June 2009 and achieving a new peak of 12. It was certified platinum by the Australian Recording Industry Association (ARIA) for selling 7,500 copies. PCD Live from London moderately in select European countries; it debuted and peaked at numbers 20 and 24 on the Czech Republic Music DVD and Music DVD Top 30 in the Netherlands respectively. In the United Kingdom, PCD Live from London debuted at number 26 on the Official Video Chart, a list compiled by the Official Charts Company on the week ending December 16, 2006. Four weeks later the DVD attained a peak of 24.

== Track listing ==
PCD Live from London
No.	Title	Writer(s)	Length
1.	"Buttons" (live show)	Sean Garrett; Jamal Jones; Jason Perry; Nicole Scherzinger	3:54
2.	"Beep" (live show; featuring will.i.am)	William Adams; Kara DioGuardi; Jeff Lynne	5:53
3.	"I Don't Need a Man" (live show)	Rich Harrison; Scherzinger; DioGuardi; Vanessa Brown	4:34
4.	"Feeling Good" (live show)	Leslie Bricusse; Anthony Newley	1:55
5.	"Stickwitu" (live show)	Franne Golde; Kasia Livingston; Robert Palmer	4:17
6.	"Show Me What You Got (Interlude)" (live show)	Scherzinger; Jones	2:07
7.	"Wait a Minute" (live show; featuring Timbaland)	Timothy Mosley; Keri Hilson	3:10
8.	"Don't Cha" (live show)	Anthony Ray; Thomas Callaway	4:51
9.	"Don't Cha" (music video; featuring Busta Rhymes)		4:44
10.	"Stickwitu" (music video)		3:34
11.	"Beep" (music video; featuring will.i.am)		4:09
12.	"Buttons" (music video; featuring Snoop Dogg)		3:58
13.	"I Don't Need a Man" (music video)		3:41
14.	"Wait a Minute" (music video; featuring Timbaland)		3:52
15.	"Beep" (Behind the Scenes)		2:01
16.	"Buttons" (Behind the Scenes)		4:02
17.	"Meet the Dolls – Nicole"		2:17
18.	"Meet the Dolls – Kimberly"		2:03
19.	"Meet the Dolls – Melody"		1:43
20.	"Meet the Dolls – Jessica"		2:02
21.	"Meet the Dolls – Ashley"		1:53
22.	"Meet the Dolls – Carmit"		1:51
23.	"The Rise of the Dolls"		2:57
24.	"PCD the Music"		4:28
25.	"Don't Cha" (Karaoke version)		4:37

== Credits and personnel ==
Credits adapted from the liner notes of PCD Live from London. Live performance and interview footage are courtesy of Vodafone TBA.

Recording and editing

- Edited at Cut + Run, Santa Monica, California.
- Bonus content mixed at Lime Studios, Santa Monica, California
- Mastered at Bernie Grundman Mastering.

=== Personnel ===
Art credits

- Jeff Grippe – DVD creative direction
- Anthony Mandler – photography
- Julian Peploe – package design
- Ginger Ramsey-Grippe – DVD creative direction

PCD interviews

- Mace Cahme – producer
- Donn Viola – director

Music videos

- Michael Angelos – producer (track 14)
- Chris Applebaum – director (track 13)
- Benny Boom – director (track 11)
- Nigel Dick – director (track 10)
- Nina Dluhy – producer (track 10)
- John Hardin – producer (track 13)
- Paul Hunter – director (track 9)
- Francis Lawrence – director (track 12)
- Ron Mohrhoff – producer (track 9)
- Roger Ubina – producer (track 11)
- Marc Webb – director (track 14)
- Lynn Zekanis – producer (track 12)

Audio mixing credits

- Robin Antin – co-producer
- Ron Fair – showtape producer
- Brian Gardner – mastering
- Michael Minden – co-producer
- Brian Malouf – mixing and Pro Tools editing
- Polow da Don – showtape producer

Editing credits

- Franco Castilla – assistant editor
- Luc Giddens – assistant editor
- Chris Gigard – producer
- Jeff Grippe – editing
- Thomas Han – additional editing
- Kimberly Hoffman – assistant editor
- Erin Nordstorm – additional editing
- Jen Tiexiera – additional editing
- Megan Welsh – producer

Tour credits

- Joe Bonanno – video director live
- Zac Cromwell – lightning tech
- Bryan "Froggy" Cross – tour manager, production manager, audio engineer
- Dustin Delker – audio system tech
- Roy Fountain – video tech
- Sara Gepp – audio system tech
- Brian Graham – audio system tech
- Barry Lather – creative designer
- Charity Lomax – road manager
- Scott Warner – lightning designer

== Charts ==
Chart (2006–09)	Peak position
Australian Music DVD (ARIA)	12
Czech Republic Music DVD (ČNS IFPI)	20
Dutch Music DVD (MegaCharts)	26
UK Music Video (OCC)	24
US Music Video Sales (Billboard)	12

== Certifications ==
Region	Certification	Certified units/sales
Australia (ARIA)	Platinum	15,000^{^}
Brazil (Pro-Música Brasil)	Gold	15,000^{*}
Canada (Music Canada)	Platinum	10,000^{^}
New Zealand (RMNZ)	Gold	2,500^{^}
^{*} Sales figures based on certification alone.^{^} Shipments figures based on certification alone.

== Release history ==
Country	Date	Format	Label
Germany	December 1, 2006	DVD	Universal Music Group
Netherlands	December 1, 2006	DVD	Universal Music Group
Australia	December 2, 2006	DVD	Universal Music Group
Sweden	December 4, 2006	DVD	Universal Music Group
Canada	December 5, 2006	DVD	Universal Music Group
United States	December 5, 2006	DVD	A&M Records
France	December 11, 2006	DVD	Universal Music Group
