= Bad Girl (Confessions of a Shopaholic song) =

2009 song by the Pussycat Dolls

Song by the Pussycat Dolls

from the album Confessions of a Shopaholic
- Released: February 10, 2009
- Length: 2:28
- Label: Hollywood
- Songwriters: Jamal Jones; Chris Brown; Ester Dean; Darnell Dalton; Lamar Taylor; Jason Perry
- Producer: Polow da Don

"Bad Girl" is a song recorded by American girl group the Pussycat Dolls for the soundtrack of the film Confessions of a Shopaholic (2009). The song is about an addiction to shopping, and more specifically, buying shoes and handbags.

The song was initially recorded by Barbadian singer Rihanna and American singer Chris Brown. Their version of the song was excluded from the soundtrack, in favor of a version performed by the Pussycat Dolls. Rihanna and Brown's version of the song was leaked on the internet on January 6, 2009. Hollywood Records' decision to not include Rihanna and Brown's version was criticized by Ryan Brockington for the New York Post, but Michael Quinn for BBC Music was complimentary of the Pussycat Dolls' version. Rihanna and Brown's version charted at number 55 on the US Hot R&B/Hip-Hop Songs.

== Background ==
"Bad Girl" was written by Jamal Jones, Chris Brown, Ester Dean, Darnell Dalton, Lamar Taylor and Jason Perry. Production of the song was helmed by Jones under his production name, Polow da Don. It was recorded by Rihanna and Brown for inclusion on the soundtrack album for the film Confessions of a Shopaholic (2009).

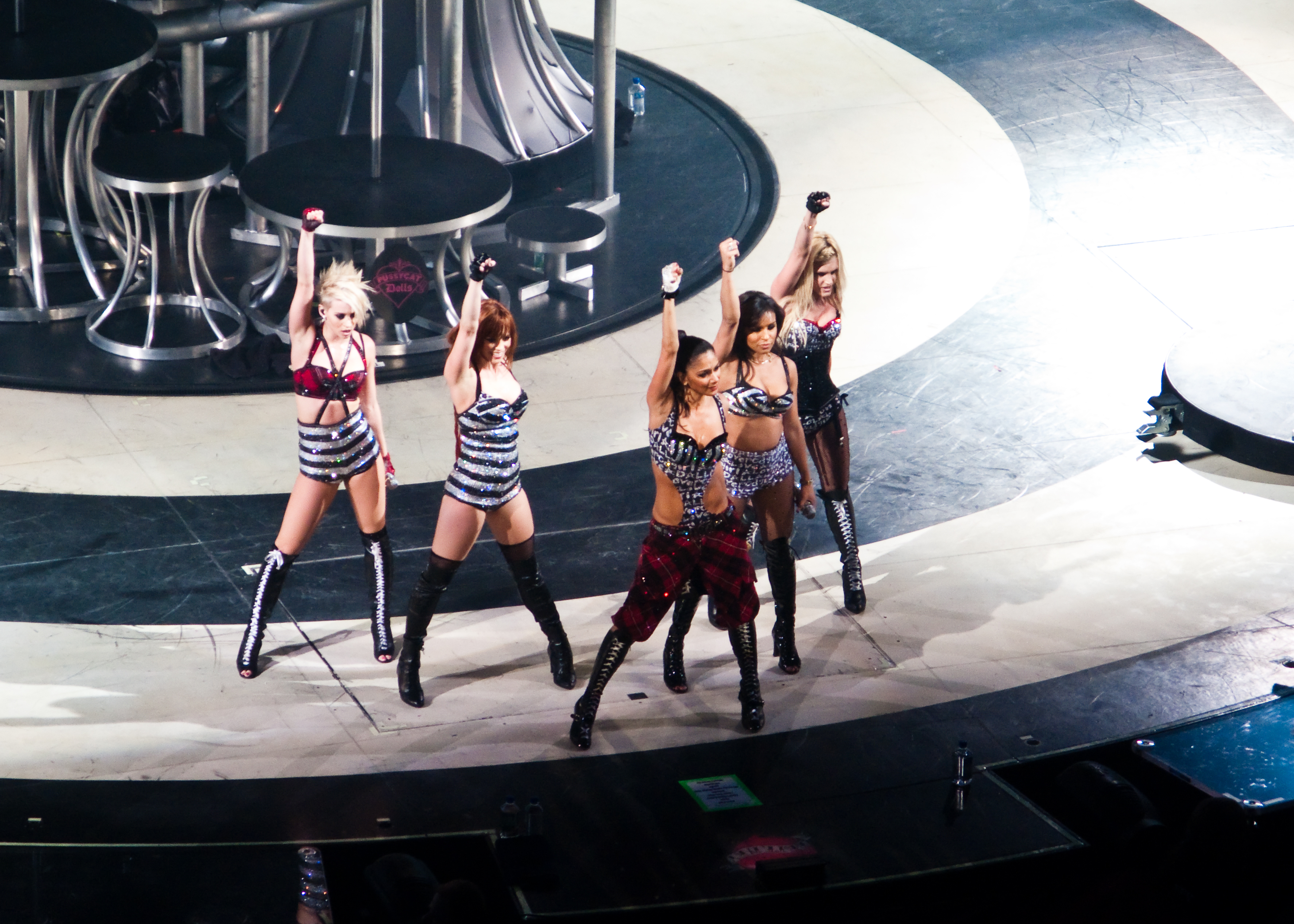
Rihanna and Brown's version of "Bad Girl" was replaced by a version performed by the Pussycat Dolls (pictured).

In an interview with Jayson Rodriguez for MTV News, da Don explained how he conceptualized the song, saying "I came from a Jerry Bruckheimer meeting after seeing the movie, and they were telling us all the music they needed for all the scenes and the characters. So that night I went to the studio and I was telling Chris about (the meeting). And he was like, 'Let's get on it.' It was crazy, because Jerry Bruckheimer's dream was to have a song from Rihanna (for the movie), and I delivered Rihanna and Chris Brown in 24 hours. So they were like, 'Wow, that's crazy.'" He continued to explain how he, Rihanna and Brown developed the song in the recording studio, saying "When her, Chris and myself were in the room, it's fun. That's when the music isn't work at all. It's all freestyle. Chris comes up with an idea; I come up with one. Rihanna will weigh in. And we build." The song leaked on January 6, 2009. Their version of the song was excluded from the soundtrack, in favor of a version performed by the American girl group the Pussycat Dolls.

== Music and lyrics ==
The lyrics of "Bad Girl" revolve around the protagonist's addiction to shopping, particularly for shoes and handbags. Rihanna sings the lyric "Need no bargain, need no sale/ I want the best, I dress me well," and is joined by Brown at the end of the song, who raps "She's a walking sto', I'm talking about her clothes/ I just pause, I'm in awe, cause she's a fashion show." The song's producer, Polow da Don, stated in his interview with MTV News that Rihanna's vocal performance was "unique", as well as saying how Brown delivers his rap with a high amount of energy and conviction.

== Critical response ==
Ryan Brockington for the New York Post was critical of Hollywood Records decision to not include Rihanna and Brown's version on the soundtrack, writing "the Pussycat Dolls are listed as the artist, and as much as I wanted to believe it was a typo, I pressed play, and there was Nicole Scherzinger and her kittens singing away." Brockington continued to express his distaste, writing "Now I have to listen to some overproduced vocals by a pack of hyenas and their booty-slap noises."

He noted that Polow da Don had also produced songs for Brown and the Pussycat Dolls, including the latter's "Buttons", and that he might have had a part in deciding who he wanted to record the song which would ultimately be included on the soundtrack. Michael Quinn for BBC Music was complimentary of the Pussycat Dolls cover, writing that their version managed to be "sultry and raucous" at the same time.

== Credits and personnel ==
- Songwriting – Chris Brown, Darnell Dalton, Eric Florence, Ester Dean, Jamal Jones, Lamar Raynard Taylor.
- Production – Polow da Don

== Charts ==
Following the leak of Rihanna and Chris Brown's version of "Bad Girl", it debuted at number 55 on the US Hot R&B/Hip-Hop Songs chart on the week of February 28, 2009.

Chart (2009)	Peak position
US Hot R&B/Hip-Hop Songs (Billboard)	55
