= Confessions of a Shopaholic (soundtrack) =

Confessions of a Shopaholic (Original Soundtrack)

Soundtrack album by various artists
- Released: February 17, 2009
- Recorded: 2008
- Genres: Pop; dance-pop; electropop; hip hop; R&B
- Length: 46:44
- Label: Hollywood

Singles from Confessions of a Shopaholic (Original Soundtrack)
- 1. "Unstoppable" Released: January 22, 2009; 2. "Stuck with Each Other" Released: February 10, 2009

Confessions of a Shopaholic (Original Soundtrack) is the soundtrack to the 2009 film Confessions of a Shopaholic. It was released on February 17, 2009, by Hollywood Records. The album accompanies various pop, hip-hop and R&B tracks performed by an assortment of artists such as Lady Gaga, Shontelle, Akon, the Pussycat Dolls, amongst others.

== Background ==
The soundtrack featured 13 songs including works from popular artists, such as Lady Gaga, Jessie James Decker, Adrienne Bailon-Houghton, Kat DeLuna, Shontelle, Akon, The Pussycat Dolls, Natasha Bedingfield, Trey Songz, Greg Laswell and Macy Gray. The album also features a suit composed by James Newton Howard.

"Fashion"
A 17-second sample of "Fashion", where Lady Gaga sings the chorus.

"Fashion" was originally written by Gaga with music producer-songwriter RedOne in 2007, and the latter gave the song to Heidi Montag; a leaked version featuring her vocals had received poor response, which prompted the team to re-record it with Gaga. Initially the song was set to be featured in the soundtrack of Sex and the City (2008), but it was then featured in the third season of Ugly Betty in the episode "Bad Amanda", and then again in this film's soundtrack, releasing as a promotional single on January 13, 2009. After, Gaga's version released, Montag in 2022, called out Gaga for allegedly stealing that song and sabotaging her career, despite the negative response for her version.

The song "Unstoppable" by Kat Deluna was released as single on January 22, 2009, followed by "Stuck with Each Other" from Shonette featuring Akon, on February 10, 2009. The track "Bad Girl" was also issued on the same date. It was originally recorded by Rihanna and Chris Brown but their version was scrapped in favor of a version performed by the Pussycat Dolls.

== Reception ==
Eric Schneider of AllMusic described the Confessions of a Shopaholic soundtrack as a compilation of accessible, consumer-themed pop songs that align closely with the film's retail-centric narrative and tone. He highlighted Lady Gaga's "sassy" track, "Fashion", and Adrienne Bailon's "enthusiastically materialistic" rendition of "Big Spender". Michael Quinn of BBC noted that the album "scores considerably higher" than the Sex and the City soundtrack.

== Track listing ==
Confessions of a Shopaholic: Original Soundtrack track listing
No.	Title	Writer(s)	Performer	Length
1.	"Accessory"	Rodney Jerkins; Michael Mani; Jordan Omley	Jordyn Taylor	3:06
2.	"Fashion"	Stefani Germanotta; RedOne	Lady Gaga	2:51
3.	"Blue Jeans"	Jessie James; Julian Bunetta	Jessie James	3:56
4.	"Uncontrollable"	Dernst Emile; Lazonate Franklin	Adrienne Bailon	3:30
5.	"Calling You"	RedOne; Frankie Storm; Kat DeLuna	Kat DeLuna	3:20
6.	"Stuck with Each Other"	Diane Warren	Shontelle featuring Akon	3:20
7.	"Unstoppable"	RedOne; Kinnda "Kee" Hamid	Kat DeLuna	3:49
8.	"Big Spender"	Jerkins; Kalenna Harper	Adrienne Bailon	3:49
9.	"Bad Girl"	Ester Dean; Jamal Jones; Lamar Taylor; Darnell Dalton; Jason Perry; Eric Florence; Chris Brown	The Pussycat Dolls	2:27
10.	"Again"	Ray Romulus; Jonathan Yip; Jeremy Reeves; Jerkins; Peter Hernandez; Philip Lawrence	Natasha Bedingfield	3:57
11.	"Takes Time to Love"	Dean; Brown; Jones; Dalton; Taylor	Trey Songz	2:45
12.	"Girls Just Want to Have Fun"	Robert Hazard	Greg Laswell	2:37
13.	"Don't Forget Me"	Harry Nilsson	Macy Gray	2:37
14.	"Shopaholic Suite"	James Newton Howard	James Newton Howard	4:40
Total length:				46:44

== Chart performance ==
Chart (2009)	Peak position
UK Compilation Albums (OCC)	74
UK Album Downloads (OCC)	93
UK Soundtrack Albums (OCC)	11
US Billboard 200	135
US Top Soundtracks (Billboard)	11
