= I Don't Need a Man =

2006 single by the Pussycat Dolls

Single by the Pussycat Dolls

from the album PCD
- B-side: "We Went as Far as We Felt Like Going"
- Released: September 25, 2006
- Studio: Record Plant (Los Angeles)
- Genre: Post-disco
- Length: 3:39
- Label: A&M; Interscope
- Songwriters: Rich Harrison; Nicole Scherzinger; Kara DioGuardi; Vanessa Brown
- Producer: Rich Harrison

The Pussycat Dolls singles chronology
"Buttons" (2006)	"I Don't Need a Man" (2006)	"Wait a Minute" (2006)

Music video
- "I Don't Need a Man" on YouTube

"I Don't Need a Man" is a song recorded by American girl group the Pussycat Dolls for their debut studio album, PCD (2005). It was written and produced by Rich Harrison, with additional writing from Nicole Scherzinger, Kara DioGuardi, and Vanessa Brown. The song was released as the fifth single from the album on September 25, 2006, by A&M Records and Interscope Records. Musically, it draws from 1980s music and includes elements of dance, pop, and R&B. Inspired by Destiny's Child's "Independent Women Part I" (2000), the song is a post-disco that features feminist themes and rejects objectification and co-dependency, while part of the chorus alludes to masturbation. It has been compared to works by Beyoncé and Inner City.

"I Don't Need a Man" was met with a warm reception from music critics for its catchiness, themes, and sound. Commercially, it gave the Pussycat Dolls fifth consecutive top-ten single in Australia, Belgium, Ireland, the Netherlands, New Zealand, and the United Kingdom. Over the years, the song has appeared on lists of the best feminist songs and best songs about masturbation by various publications. The song's accompanying music video, directed by Chris Applebaum, highlights the group members' femininity, and was compared to the film Grease (1978) by member Ashley Roberts. Retrospectively, critics have noted the song's influence on recordings by artists such as Beyoncé.

== Background ==
The Pussycat Dolls originated as a burlesque dance ensemble founded by choreographer Robin Antin in 1993. Over the years, the troupe gained popularity which resulted in Antin striking a deal with Jimmy Iovine—then president of Interscope Geffen A&M Records—to develop the Pussycat Dolls into a brand and create a pop girl group, with Iovine assigning the project to producer Ron Fair. Iovine considered the Pussycat Dolls as one of the "label's high-priority projects" and began enlisting various producers and songwriters to "ensure [a] maximum radio friendl[y]" sound for the debut album, PCD (2005). Amongst the recruits, Rich Harrison wrote and produced "I Don't Need a Man". Additional songwriters include, lead singer Nicole Scherzinger, who assumed the majority of the vocals and is the only member of the group to have songwriting credits on their album, Kara DioGuardi, and Vanessa "VV" Brown. Brown was hired by Fair to record backing vocals for the group's album. During one session, she unintentionally wrote the song's middle-eight while improvising the improvising bassline. Brown was surprised her contribution was kept. Fair provided additional and vocal production for the song. Tal Herzberg engineered and used Pro-Tools for the track. Further engineering was carried out by Scotty Beats, JD Andrew, Mike Hogue, and Mike "Angry" Eleopoulos. Peter Mokran mixed "I Don't Need a Man" at the Record Plant studios in Los Angeles. Member Ashley Roberts first confirmed on the group's website that "I Don't Need a Man" would be released as the fifth single in Europe.

== Music and lyrics ==
"I Don't Need a Man"
A 23-second sample of the chorus of "I Don't Need a Man", whose instrumentation also consists of "blaring horns."

Musically, "I Don't Need a Man" is a post-disco song, featuring elements of dance, pop and R&B while channeling 1980s tropes. The uptempo track, is backed by "blaring horns", "shuffling coconut beat", glockenspiel, synths, the piano, and the Wurlitzer. It has a length of 3:39 and is composed in the key of D minor and set in common time, with a moderate groove of 105 beats per minute. The group's vocal range spans from the low note of A_{3} to the high note of D_{5}. Critics have liken the sound to the works of Beyoncé and Inner City. Scherzinger was inspired to write "I Don't Need a Man" after Destiny's Child's "Independent Women Part I" (2000), which featured feministic themes such as economic independence from men. Similarly, "I Don't Need a Man" advocates for female empowerment and reminds listeners "that there’s a difference between wanting a man and needing one." The song also rejects objectification and co-dependency, while the chorus ends with lyrics alluding to masturbation: "I don't need a ring around my finger / To make me feel complete / So let me break it down / I can get off when you ain't around." Thematically, critics have noted the song is a prequel to Beyoncé's "Single Ladies (Put a Ring on It)" (2008) and Meghan Trainor's "No" (2016).

== Reception ==
=== Critical ===
Following, PCD's release, Elysa Gardner from USA Today highlighted "I Don't Need a Man" as one of the album's "better tracks" adding it "[sparkles] despite [the group's] superficiality." Linda McGee of RTÉ was confident would "get much airplay in the future" noting it grabs the listener's attention instantly. Likewise, Emily Tan from Idolator wrote that after "one round of listening to [the song], single women, gay men and the like will be ready to get dolled up for a great night out." Chuck Arnold and Ralph Novak from People magazine lauded the song's themes and production, deeming it as one of the album's best songs. AllMusic's Stephen Thomas Erlewine regarded the songs as one of the album's catchiest songs. Nick Butler from Sputnikmusic found the song to be a departure in theme from the rest of the album, although still deemed it a good song. John Murphy from MusicOMH appreciated its synth instrumentation. Spence D. from IGN acknowledged the attempts to sound unique but felt it ultimately blends with other pop songs in mainstream radio. A writer for The Irish Times criticized the song for its formulaic themes writing, "It's the oldest chick trick in the book - act all independent and we'll come running back, begging like dogs. The laugh is, we fall for it every time."

=== Commercial ===
In the United Kingdom, "I Don't Need a Man" debuted at number 21 one on the UK Singles Chart in the last week of September 2006, selling 5,448 digital downloads. The following week it peaked at number seven, selling an additional 13,220 copies, giving the Pussycat Dolls their fifth consecutive top-ten single on that chart. Furthermore, the song peaked at number one on the UK R&B Chart and eight on the Scottish Singles Charts, which are compiled by the Official Charts Company's (OCC). That same week, its parent album, PCD, crossed the one million mark in sales in the UK. The OCC ranks "I Don't Need a Man" as the Pussycat Dolls' tenth most successful song on the singles chart. In May 2021, it garnered a silver certification from the British Phonographic Industry (BPI) for selling more than 200,000 copies in the UK. The song was also the Pussycat Dolls fifth consecutive top-ten single in Australia—where it received gold certification from the Australian Recording Industry Association (ARIA) for shifting more than 35,000 units)—, Belgium (Flanders and Wallonia), Ireland, the Netherlands, and New Zealand. The song reached the top 20 in Austria, Finland, France, Germany, Italy, and Switzerland, and failed to enter the top twenty in Canada, the Commonwealth of Independent States (CIS), the Czech Republic, Denmark, Sweden, and the United States.

=== Recognition ===
"I Don't Need a Man" on listicles
Publication	List	Rank	Ref.
BuzzFeed	50 Girl Power Anthems To Pump Up Your Life	17	
Cosmopolitan	50 Feminist Songs That’ll Have You Feeling So Damn Powerful	26	
Glamour	50 Girl Power Anthems To Pump Up Your Life	Listed	
HuffPost	22 Sexy Songs That Give Female Masturbation The Love It Deserves	9	
Marie Claire	40 Galentine's Day Songs That Are All About Female Empowerment	19	
Nylon	The 12 Best Girl-power Anthems Of the Aughts	Listed	
Pitchfork	The 13 Best Pop Songs About Women Masturbating	8	
Pride.com	20 Girl Anthems That Made Me A Feminist	19	
Thought Catalog	50 Girl Power Anthems To Pump Up Your Life	38	

== Music video ==
The music video for "I Don't Need a Man" was shot towards the end of July 2006. The following month, Chris Applebaum was confirmed to be the director for the visual. In a blog entry, Roberts deduced that the music video was feminine and simple comparing it to "a modern day scene from Grease (1978). She elaborated the showed their "female ways" in the video like, doing their hair and makeup and shaving their legs. The group performs choreographed dance routines which include a seated one, mimicking a hair salon scene. A writer for The Irish Times described the videos as "raunchy". At the 2007 MTV Australia Video Music Awards the video received a Sexiest Video nomination.

== Track listings and formats ==
UK digital download and European CD single

1. "I Don't Need a Man" – 3:40
2. "We Went as Far as We Felt Like Going" – 3:52

International digital EP

1. "I Don't Need a Man" – 3:40
2. "I Don't Need a Man" (instrumental) – 3:29
3. "We Went as Far as We Felt Like Going" – 3:52

Australian and UK maxi CD single

1. "I Don't Need a Man" – 3:40
2. "I Don't Need a Man" (instrumental) – 3:29
3. "We Went as Far as We Felt Like Going" – 3:52
4. "I Don't Need a Man" (music video) – 3:40

US Hit 3 Pack EP

1. "I Don't Need a Man" – 3:40
2. "Don't Cha" (featuring Busta Rhymes) – 4:33
3. "Buttons" (featuring Snoop Dogg) – 3:51

== Credits and personnel ==
Credits adapted from the liner notes of PCD and Tidal.

Recording

- Mixed at The Record Plant (Hollywood, California)

Personnel

- JD Andrews – engineer
- Scotty Beats – engineer
- Vanessa Brown – background vocals, songwriter
- Kara DioGuardi – songwriter
- Mike "Angry" Eleopoulos – engineer
- Ron Fair – incidental additional producer, vocal producer, vocal arranger, glockenspiel, piano, Wurlitzer
- Gary Grant – horns
- Rich Harrison – songwriter, producer, track programmer
- Tal Herzberg – engineer, Pro Tools, bass
- Jerry Hey – horn arrangement, horns
- Dan Higgins – horns
- Mike Hogue – assistant mix engineer
- Peter Mokran – mix engineer
- Bill Reichenbach – horns
- Nicole Scherzinger – songwriter

== Charts ==
=== Weekly charts ===
Weekly chart performance for "I Don't Need a Man"
Chart (2006–2007)	Peak position
Australia (ARIA)	6
Australian Urban (ARIA)	2
Austria (Ö3 Austria Top 40)	19
Belgium (Ultratop 50 Flanders)	7
Belgium (Ultratop 50 Wallonia)	8
Canada Hot 100 (Billboard)	67
CIS Airplay (TopHit)	137
Czech Republic Airplay (ČNS IFPI)	62
Denmark (Tracklisten)	32
Finland (Suomen virallinen lista)	17
France (SNEP)	12
Germany (GfK)	20
Greece (IFPI)	21
Hungary (Rádiós Top 40)	7
Hungary (Dance Top 40)	12
Ireland (IRMA)	9
Italy (FIMI)	13
Netherlands (Single Top 100)	5
Netherlands (Dutch Top 40)	4
New Zealand (Recorded Music NZ)	7
Poland (Nielsen Music Control)	3
Romania Airplay (Media Forest)	4
Scotland Singles (OCC)	8
Slovakia Airplay (ČNS IFPI)	16
Sweden (Sverigetopplistan)	27
Switzerland (Schweizer Hitparade)	15
UK Singles (OCC)	7
UK Hip Hop/R&B (OCC)	1
US Billboard Hot 100	93

=== Year-end charts ===
2006 year-end performance for "I Don't Need a Man"
Chart (2006)	Position
Australia (ARIA)	55
Australian Urban (ARIA)	21
Belgium (Ultratop 50 Flanders)	85
Belgium (Ultratop 50 Wallonia)	95
Hungary (Rádiós Top 40)	97
Netherlands (Dutch Top 40)	33
Netherlands (Single Top 100)	73
UK Singles (OCC)	138

2007 year-end performance for "I Don't Need a Man"
Chart (2007)	Position
Australian Urban (ARIA)	43
France (SNEP)	78
Romania (Romanian Top 100)	83

== Certifications ==
Certifications for "I Don't Need a Man"
Region	Certification	Certified units/sales
Australia (ARIA)	Gold	35,000^{^}
United Kingdom (BPI)	Silver	200,000^{‡}
^{^} Shipments figures based on certification alone.^{‡} Sales+streaming figures based on certification alone.

== Release history ==
Release dates and formats for "I Don't Need a Man"
Region	Date	Format(s)	Label(s)	Ref.
Netherlands	September 25, 2006	CD	Universal Music	
United Kingdom	September 25, 2006	CD; digital download; maxi CD	Polydor	
Germany	October 9, 2006	Digital download (EP)	Universal Music	
Australia	October 30, 2006	CD	Universal Music	
Germany	November 10, 2006	CD	Universal Music	
France	February 26, 2007	CD	Universal Music	
United States	June 19, 2007	Digital download (Hit 3 Pack)	A&M; Interscope	
