= Buttons (The Pussycat Dolls song) =

2006 single by the Pussycat Dolls

Single by the Pussycat Dolls featuring Snoop Dogg

from the album PCD
- B-side: "Flirt"
- Released: April 11, 2006
- Genre: R&B; hip-hop; pop
- Length: 3:52 (single version); 3:45 (album version)
- Label: A&M; Interscope
- Songwriters: Sean Garrett; Jamal "Polow da Don" Jones; Jason Perry; Nicole Scherzinger; Calvin Broadus (Note: Final Edit version)
- Producers: Polow da Don; Sean Garrett; Ron Fair

The Pussycat Dolls singles chronology
"Beep" (2006)	"Buttons" (2006)	"I Don't Need a Man" (2006)

Snoop Dogg singles chronology
"Say Somethin'" (2006)	"Buttons" (2006)	"Go to Church" (2006)

Music video
- "Buttons" on YouTube

"Buttons" is a song recorded by American girl group the Pussycat Dolls from their debut studio album, PCD (2005). It was written by Sean Garrett, Jamal Jones, Jason Perry and group member Nicole Scherzinger, and produced by the former two alongside Ron Fair. It is a hip hop-influenced R&B and pop track featuring synthesizers and a Middle Eastern rhythm, with the group pleading a reluctant man to help them undress whilst adopting a submissive stance. A remix version featuring American rapper Snoop Dogg was released as the album's fourth single on April 11, 2006, by A&M Records and Interscope Records.

"Buttons" received mixed to positive reviews from contemporary music critics, who praised its sex appeal and energy but criticized the production as familiar and unoriginal. The song was featured on 2006 year-end lists by Rolling Stone and Vibe. A commercial success, the song reached number one in Austria, Hungary and New Zealand, where it became the group's fourth consecutive number-one. It also peaked within the top ten in 12 other countries, including the UK Singles Chart and US Billboard Hot 100, where it peaked at number three. With "Buttons" selling two million digital copies in the US, the Pussycat Dolls became the first girl group in digital history to have three singles cross that mark. The single has been certified quintuple platinum by the Recording Industry Association of America (RIAA).

The accompanying music video, directed by filmmaker Francis Lawrence, is an ode to the group's burlesque origin and features multiple dance sequences, including a Bollywood-inspired routine towards the end choreographed by Tovaris Wilson and Lena Giroux. It received two nominations at the 2006 MTV Video Music Awards, ultimately winning one for Best Dance Video. To further promote "Buttons", the group performed the song during several television programs and awards shows, including Fashion Rocks and the 2006 American Music Awards, where clips from their performances went viral in 2020, for the perceived tension between Scherzinger and Melody Thornton onstage.

== Writing and production ==
"Buttons" was written and produced by Sean Garrett and Jamal "Polow da Don" Jones, with additional writing by Jason Perry and the group's lead singer Nicole Scherzinger, and additional production by Ron Fair. According to Garrett, "Buttons" was conceived in a short amount of time, with Scherzinger in mind saying: "[she] is very sexy so the concept of loosening up her buttons,—every guy would want that and women wouldn't have a problem with guys loosening up their buttons." Moreover, he credits PCD executive producer Jimmy Iovine for "[pushing] me to be creative and the more creative I am, the more he likes it." Fair and Young Smoke handled the vocal and additional production respectively with Tal Herzberg being credited as a co-producer. Herzberg also operated Pro-Tools and engineering along with J.D. Andrew and Mike "Angry" Eleopoulos, with the assistance of Ariel Chobaz.

"Buttons" was mixed by Dave Pensado at the Larrabee Sound Studios in Burbank, California, where the tracks where handed to him at different stages. Trans-X Multi plug-in was used on the loop to give it a more transient feeling. Scherzinger's lead vocals were processed through Line 6's Echo Farm by adding distortion. Pensado wanted to give Scherzinger's voice more edge without the need to scream over the microphone. The leads' vocal delay was formed by Tel-ray Variable Delay and is within the 16th range. For the effects of the lead vocals, Pensado wanted to minimize the use of effects, and give them a "chorus-like sound" through Waves' Metaflanger.

"Buttons" was included on PCD as the fifth track. Following the success of "Don't Cha" and "Beep", which featured American rappers Busta Rhymes and will.i.am respectively, Snoop Dogg was recruited for its single release. Scherzinger confirmed the collaboration at the Grammy Style Studio event in February 2006. They first collaborated at the 2005 Radio Music Awards, where the Pussycat Dolls performed "Santa Baby"; as part of the "racy rendition", Snoop Dogg joined them onstage dressed as Santa Claus.

== Music and lyrics ==
"Buttons"
A 24-second sample of "Buttons"

"Buttons" runs for a total of three minutes and 52 seconds, and is composed in 4/4 time and the key of D minor, with a moderate groove of 102 beats per minute. It is an R&B and pop song with elements of hip hop. Influenced by Timbaland's early works with Indian music, production consists of Middle Eastern music elements, drum loop, "snaky" synthesizers, electric violin, and percussion.

The Pussycat Dolls' vocal range spans from the low note of G_{3} to the high note of A_{4}, with members Scherzinger adopting breathy vocals and Melody Thornton providing ad-libs. The group takes a submissive stance towards Snoop Dogg who "seems to be as the object of affection for the girls, who ask him to 'loosen up [our] buttons' and to not 'leave [us] asking for more'."

== Release ==
The remix version of "Buttons" featuring rapper Snoop Dogg was released on April 11, 2006, via digital download, as the fourth single from PCD. The song also impacted US contemporary hit and rhythmic radio formats on May 8, through A&M Records and Interscope Records. The remix, subtitled "Final Edit Version", was included on the tour edition of PCD later that year.

== Critical reception ==
In his review of PCD, Spence D. of IGN commented that the Middle Eastern elements in "Buttons" may be "familiar and funky, but it doesn't present anything new to the realm of female soul pop." Writing for Sputnikmusic, Nick Butler deemed "Buttons" as "enjoyable enough," but felt it "doesn't work as well as ['Don't Cha and 'Beep'], and sonically [is] not far from being all over the place." Slant Magazine's Sal Cinquemani described the song as "degrading material" noting "[they] are a bit easier to swallow thanks, in part, to the group's cartoonish image." Miriam Zendle of Digital Spy was unimpressed with "Buttons" labelling "as awful as [their] debut single, 'Don't Cha'," adding the song's sexual vibe "leaves the listener feeling somewhat sullied."

Sean Fennessey of Pitchfork criticized Dogg's appearance for his "indolent" verse. Conversely, a writer for Vibe magazine favored the song for "[oozing] sexuality." Rolling Stone highlighted the song's chorus, labelling it as "hot", and Snoop Dogg's appearance. Chris Courtney of Chicago Tribune described "Buttons" as a "summer sizzler." Kelley Carter of the Detroit Free Press commented that the song is a "the kind of song that makes the clubbers go crazy."

== Accolades ==
=== Rankings ===
"Buttons" on lists
Publication	Year	List	Type	Rank	Ref.
New York Post	2006	206 Best Songs to Download from 2006	Song	15	
Rolling Stone	2006	The 100 Best Songs of 2006	Song	91	
Vibe	2006	60 songs of '06	Song	28	
Tom Breihan (The Village Voice)	2006	The Year's Best Music Videos	Music video	10	
Playboy	2014	The 40 Sexiest Music Videos of All Time	Music video	35	

=== Awards and nominations ===
Awards and nominations for "Buttons"
Ceremony	Year	Award	Result	Ref.
ASCAP Pop Music Awards	2006	Most Performed Songs	Won	
Mnet Asian Music Awards	2006	Best International Artist	Won	
MTV Video Music Awards	2006	Best Dance Video	Won	
MTV Video Music Awards	2006	Best Choreography	Nominated	
Teen Choice Awards	2006	Choice Music: R&B/Hip-Hop Track	Nominated	
TMF Awards (the Netherlands)	2006	Radio 538 Single Award	Nominated	
Myx Music Awards	2007	Favorite International Video	Nominated	
MTV Australia Video Music Awards	2007	Best Hook Up	Nominated	
MuchMusic Video Awards	2007	People's Choice: Favourite International Group	Nominated	
Music Video Production Association Awards	2007	Best Choreography	Won	
BMI Pop Awards	2008	Award-Winning Song	Won	

== Commercial performance ==
In the United States, "Buttons" debuted at number 71, achieving the highest debut of the week on the Billboard Hot 100 on May 27, 2006 The song eventually peaked at number three in September 2006 and spent a total of 30 weeks on the chart. On Billboard's component charts, it topped the Hot Dance Club Songs and Mainstream Top 40 charts, and peaked at number three on the Dance/Mix Show Airplay and four on the Rhythmic rankings. In March 2026, it received a quintuple platinum certification from the Recording Industry Association of America (RIAA) for sales of five million units. A month earlier, "Buttons" received a BDS Certified Spin Award for receiving 300,000 radio spins in the US. In January 2010, "Buttons" surpassed digital sales of two million units, following "Don't Cha" (2005) and "When I Grow Up" (2008), making the Pussycat Dolls the first girl group in history to have three songs achieve that feat. IN 2011, chart data revealed that "Buttons" was Snoop Dogg's fourth most successful song on the Billboard charts.

In Australia, "Buttons" peaked at number two on the ARIA Singles Chart and was certified platinum by Australian Recording Industry Association (ARIA) for sales of 70,000 units. In New Zealand, "Buttons" entered the singles chart at number 38 solely based on airplay. In its third week, the song climbed 31 places and displaced Gnarls Barkley's "Crazy" from number-one, becoming the chart's 501st number-one song and the group's fourth consecutive number-one, following "Don't Cha", "Stickwitu" and "Beep". "Buttons" logged their twelfth week at the top, becoming the most successful new act in local chart history. It also gave Snoop Dogg's second number-one, after "Drop It Like It's Hot" (2004). It was certified double platinum by Recorded Music NZ (RMNZ), denoting sales of 60,000 equivalent units. It also reached the peak in Austria and Hungary.

In the United Kingdom, "Buttons" debuted at number 11 in June 2006 on the UK Singles Chart. Following its physical release, the song peaked at number three, selling 25,718 units and giving the Pussycat Dolls their fourth consecutive top-three hit. In June 2023, the song was certified platinum by the British Phonographic Industry (BPI) for track-equivalent sales of 600,000 units. The Official Charts Company (OCC) ranks "Buttons" as their third most successful song on the UK Singles Chart, and the 73rd best-selling song by a girl group. The single also reached number three in Scotland and Switzerland, number four in Belgium (Flanders), Germany, Ireland, and Slovakia, number six in Belgium (Wallonia) and the Netherlands, and number eight in the Czech Republic.. Equally, the song reached the top twenty in Finland, France, Italy and Russia.

== Music video ==
Francis Lawrence directed the music video for "Buttons" on the week of March 20, 2006, over a period of three days. During an interview with the New York Post Scherzinger said that the group was to return to their burlesque roots. "We wanted to go back to the roots of the Dolls, go with the corset vibe and have it be a little rawer and hotter." In a behind-the-scenes footage included on their live album PCD Live from London (2006), member Kimberly Wyatt agreed saying, "so, for our fifth video, we decided to turn it up a notch. It was time to see, what we are all about. Tom Breihan of The Village Voice described the accompanying music video as a "big, glossy pop video" that consists of "flashy editing, decent choreography, [and] a distinct look." The video include routines within a tunnel and a Bollywood-esque dance routine towards the end. Samantha Friedman of VH1 described the dance routine as "intriguing and sexy and sassy."

The video begins with Snoop Dogg performing his rap while Scherzinger dances around him seductively. As the first chorus begins, the group, dressed in suggestive black outfits, walking towards a tunnel where they later perform a striptease. As the second chorus begins, they are seen performing upon a horizontal bar. Towards the end of the chorus, Scherzinger separates herself from the group and performs against a backdrop of curtains made from jewelry then proceeds to dance around a chair. Before the chorus begins, four additional chairs and the group performs a dance routine. Melody Thornton is separated from the rest doing her melismatic ad-libs on the chorus. When Snoop Dogg's verse begins, the Pussycat Dolls are shown walking towards him. During the breakdown, the girls dance while smoke is filled and halfway through the video, the floor turns on fire. The video ends with the group walking away. The music video for the song has over 1 billion views as of December 19, 2025.

== Live performances ==
Following the song's official release, it was included in concerts while supporting The Black Eyed Peas' Honda Civic Tour in the US and Canada. After supporting the Peas in the UK, they flew back to the US on June 30, 2006, and appeared on Good Morning America's Summer Concert Series to perform the song along with "Don't Cha" and "Stickwitu". On September 8, 2006, they performed the track at the annual international charity fundraiser event, Fashion Rocks with American rapper Jibbs. In 2020, a clip of performance went viral highlighting the tension between Scherzinger and Thornton.

On November 21, 2006, the Pussycat Dolls performed the song in sparkly, sequined mini-dress on 2006 American Music Awards, in which they included routines involving chairs and pyrotechnics during their dance breakdown. The group initially performed as quintet, before being joined by Thornton in the final 30 seconds of the performance to do her ad-libs. The Daily Telegraph's Adam White wrote the group did a "messy rendition" of the song highlighting Thornton crashing the performance and Jessica Sutta falling of her chair. Thornton's vocals were described as "if she was Christina Aguilera stuck in a wind tunnel" adding she was singing loudly over Scherzinger's. Following the performance going viral in 2020, Thornton explained to Entertainment Tonight that travelling issues caused her to miss rehearsals and the only solution was for her to appear at the end and do her part. "Buttons" was also used as the opening number during their PCD World Tour (2006–07) and Aguilera's Back to Basics Tour (2007).

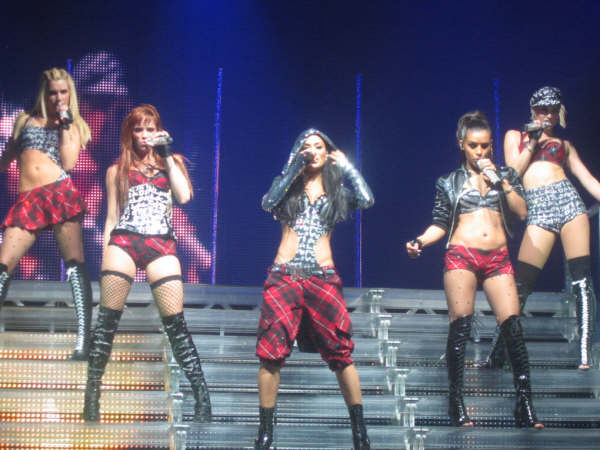
The Pussycat Dolls performing "Buttons" on top of the stairs during their Doll Domination Tour (2009)

On August 2, 2008, the Pussycat Dolls performed "Buttons" and "When I Grow Up" at the opening of the MTV Asia Awards, where they also presented an award, in Malaysia. The song was included on their Doll Domination Tour and The Circus Starring Britney Spears (both in 2009); their dance routine consisted of "full of stomping and syncopated strutting." While reviewing their headlining tour, Colene McKessick of Press and Journal wrote that their performance of "Buttons" "[set] the crowd into a frenzy." Scherzinger performed the song as part of a Pussycat Dolls medley during concerts of her first solo tour in support of her debut studio album, Killer Love (2011).

On November 30, 2019, the Pussycat Dolls reunited on The X Factor: Celebrity finale, and performed a medley of "Buttons", "When I Grow Up", "Don't Cha", and their first new song in over a decade, "React". Shortly after, British media regulator Ofcom received 400 complaints from viewers who criticized the band's revealing outfits and provocative choreography. On February 22, 2020, the group appeared on series sixteen of Ant & Dec's Saturday Night Takeaway, and performed "Buttons" as part of a medley with "Don't Cha", "Beep" and "React". The performance was set within the context of a comedy sketch where they poked fun at the controversy that aroused following their The X Factor: Celebrity. As part of the performance, a TV test card flashed up on screen from ITV reading "we're sorry for the disruption... we're working hard to fix the issue and will return to normal family-friendly, not at all sexy, uncontroversial programming soon." The test card was revealed to be a backdrop which the group jumped through.

== Resurgence ==
In 2022, a remix of "Buttons" known as the "Showmusik remix" garnered heavy attention on the video-sharing platform TikTok along with other remixes of the song. Nicole Scherzinger posted herself wearing a bikini doing a viral dance challenge to the remix in a TikTok video that same year which gained many views.

== Track listings and formats ==
- Australian and German maxi CD single
1. "Buttons" (featuring Snoop Dogg) (final edit version) – 3:52
2. "Buttons" (album version) – 3:46
3. "Flirt" – 2:57
4. "Buttons" (music video) – 4:04
- German CD single
1. "Buttons" (featuring Snoop Dogg) (final edit version) – 3:52
2. "Flirt" – 2:57
- UK CD single
1. "Buttons" – 3:52
2. "Don't Cha" (live) – 3:31
- US 12-inch vinyl
1. "Buttons" (featuring Snoop Dogg) (final edit version) – 3:51
2. "Buttons" (instrumental) – 3:46
3. "Buttons" (a cappella) (featuring Snoop Dogg) – 3:48
4. "Buttons" (album version) – 3:46
5. "Buttons" (instrumental) – 3:46
6. "Buttons" (a cappella) – 3:46

== Credits and personnel ==
Credits are adapted from the liner notes of PCD.

Mixing

- Mixed at Larrabee North (North Hollywood, Los Angeles).

Personnel

- JD Andrews – engineering
- Charlie Bisharat – electric violin
- Ariel Chobaz – assistant mix engineer
- Luis Conte – percussion
- Mike "Angry" Eleopoulos – engineering
- Ron Fair – production, vocal production
- Jamal "Polow da Don" Jones – songwriting, production, track arrangement and programming
- Sean Garrett – songwriting, production
- Tal Herzberg – co-production, engineering, Pro Tools
- Dave "Hard Drive" Pensado – mixing
- Jason Perry – songwriting
- Nicole Scherzinger – songwriting
- Young Smoke – vocal production

Remixes

- Showmusik - remixer, producer, instrument arranger, vocal arrangement
- Ste (previously SteJR) - remixer, producer, vocalist, instrument arranger, vocal arrangement
- Steven James Roberts - songwriter

== Charts ==
=== Weekly charts ===
Chart (2006–2007)	Peak position
Australia (ARIA)	2
Australian Urban (ARIA)	1
Austria (Ö3 Austria Top 40)	1
Belgium (Ultratop 50 Flanders)	4
Belgium (Ultratop 50 Wallonia)	6
Canada (Nielsen SoundScan)	5
Canada CHR/Top 40 (Billboard)	3
Canada Hot AC (Billboard)	38
Croatia International Airplay (HRT)	3
Czech Republic Airplay (ČNS IFPI)	8
Denmark (Tracklisten)	14
European Hot 100 Singles (Billboard)	6
Finland (Suomen virallinen lista)	11
France (SNEP)	12
Germany (GfK)	4
Hungary (Rádiós Top 40)	1
Hungary (Dance Top 40)	4
Ireland (IRMA)	4
Italy (FIMI)	18
Netherlands (Dutch Top 40)	6
Netherlands (Single Top 100)	7
New Zealand (Recorded Music NZ)	1
Romania (Romanian Top 100)	9
Russia Airplay (TopHit)	14
Scottish Singles Sales (Official Charts)	3
Slovakia Airplay (ČNS IFPI)	4
Switzerland (Schweizer Hitparade)	3
Sweden (Sverigetopplistan)	36
UK Singles (Official Charts)	3
UK Hip Hop/R&B (Official Charts)	2
US Billboard Hot 100	3
US Adult Pop Airplay (Billboard)	33
US Dance Club Songs (Billboard)	1
US Dance Airplay (Billboard)	3
US Pop Airplay (Billboard)	1
US Rhythmic Airplay (Billboard)	4

2025 weekly chart performance for "Buttons"
Chart (2025)	Peak position
Moldova Airplay (TopHit)	64

=== Year-end charts ===
Chart (2006)	Position
Australia (ARIA)	15
Australian Urban (ARIA)	4
Austria (Ö3 Austria Top 40)	14
Belgium (Ultratop 50 Flanders)	18
Belgium (Ultratop 50 Wallonia)	21
Canada CHR/Top 40 (Radio & Records)	6
Brazil (Crowley)	46
European Hot 100 Singles (Billboard)	20
France (SNEP)	90
Germany (Media Control GfK)	23
Hungary (Dance Top 40)	13
Hungary (Rádiós Top 40)	30
Netherlands (Dutch Top 40)	38
Netherlands (Single Top 100)	29
Romania (Romanian Top 100)	4
Russia Airplay (TopHit)	79
New Zealand (RIANZ)	8
Switzerland (Schweizer Hitparade)	18
UK Singles (OCC)	57
UK Urban (Music Week)	12
US Billboard Hot 100	15
US Dance Club Play (Billboard)	10
US Rhythmic Airplay (Billboard)	31
US All-Format (Radio & Records)	19
US CHR/Top 40 (Radio & Records)	7
US Rhythmic (Radio & Records)	31

Chart (2007)	Position
Brazil (Crowley)	27
Russia Airplay (TopHit)	148

Chart (2023)	Position
Hungary (Rádiós Top 40)	86

=== Decade-end charts ===
Decade-end chart performance for "Buttons"
Chart (2000–2009)	Position
Austria (Ö3 Austria Top 40)	97

== Certifications and sales ==
Region	Certification	Certified units/sales
Australia (ARIA)	Platinum	70,000^{^}
Belgium (BRMA)	Gold	25,000^{*}
Brazil (Pro-Música Brasil) DMS	Gold	30,000^{*}
Brazil (Pro-Música Brasil)	Platinum	60,000^{‡}
Denmark (IFPI Danmark)	Platinum	8,000^{^}
Germany (BVMI)	Gold	150,000^{‡}
New Zealand (RMNZ)	2× Platinum	60,000^{‡}
United Kingdom (BPI)	Platinum	836,000
United States (RIAA)	5× Platinum	5,000,000^{‡}
United States (RIAA) Mastertone	Platinum	1,000,000^{*}
^{*} Sales figures based on certification alone.^{^} Shipments figures based on certification alone.^{‡} Sales+streaming figures based on certification alone.

== Release history ==
Release dates and formats for "Buttons"
Region	Date	Format(s)	Label(s)	Ref.
United States	April 11, 2006	Digital download	A&M; Interscope	
United States	May 2, 2006	12-inch vinyl	A&M; Interscope	
United States	May 8, 2006	Contemporary hit radio; rhythmic contemporary radio	A&M; Interscope	
United Kingdom	June 26, 2006	CD; digital download	Polydor	
Germany	July 7, 2006	CD; maxi CD	Universal Music	
France	October 2, 2006	Maxi CD	Polydor	

== See also ==
- List of number-one hits of 2006 (Austria)
- List of number-one singles from the 2000s (New Zealand)
- List of Billboard Hot Dance Club Play number ones of 2006
- List of Billboard Mainstream Top 40 number-one songs of 2006
