= Don't Cha =

2004 single by Tori Alamaze and, later, the Pussycat Dolls

"Don't Cha" is a song written by Sir Mix-a-Lot, Busta Rhymes and CeeLo Green, and produced by the latter. The song was originally recorded and published in 2004 by Tori Alamaze, former backing vocalist for OutKast, and was released as her debut single. After minor success, and dissatisfaction with Universal Records, Alamaze gave up her rights to the song.

The Pussycat Dolls, an American burlesque dance troupe who were poised to reinvent themselves as a pop music girl group, were offered the song from Universal. The group recorded a new version of "Don't Cha" with raps from Busta Rhymes and released it in 2005 as the lead single from their debut studio album, PCD. The Pussycat Dolls' version received positive reviews from music critics, many of whom highlighted it as a standout track from the album; however, some of them criticized Busta Rhymes' appearance. The song was a commercial success, peaking at number two on the US Billboard Hot 100 and atop the Dance Club Songs and Pop 100 charts. Outside the United States, "Don't Cha" topped the charts in 15 countries. An accompanying music video for the song was directed by Paul Hunter.

== Tori Alamaze version ==
"Don't Cha"

Single by Tori Alamaze
- Released: November 30, 2004
- Recorded: January 2004
- Studio: Basement (Atlanta)
- Genre: Dance
- Length: 4:25
- Label: Radiculture; Universal
- Songwriters: Anthony Ray; Thomas Callaway
- Producer: Cee-Lo Green

Tori Alamaze singles chronology
"Don't Cha" (2004)	"Control" (2004)

=== Writing and production ===
In January 2004, American recording artist and producer CeeLo Green finished writing and producing "Don't Cha", the chorus of which reprises the hook from "Swass" by Sir Mix-a-Lot from his album Swass (1988). The song was recorded in a basement studio in Atlanta, Georgia by Tori Alamaze, a former backing vocalist for the hip-hop duo OutKast in the same month. She had signed to his imprint label Radiculture Records. Billboard's Rashaun Hall described her version of "Don't Cha" as a "midtempo dance gem" that is "backed by a driving minimalist bassline".

=== Release ===
During recording sessions, at Jermaine Dupri’s studio in Atlanta, DJ Felli Fel from Power 106 in Los Angeles heard "Don't Cha" and started to play on his show. As requests increased, the song gained some regional prominence. In November 2004, Alamaze signed a record deal with Universal Motown Records, a part of Universal Music Group. “Don’t Cha” was featured in the film Beauty Shop. Around spring of 2005, while Tori was promoting the song, she discovered that the label decided to give "Don't Cha" to the Pussycat Dolls.

=== Critical reception ===
Alamaze's version of "Don't Cha" received positive reviews from critics. Saptosa Foster of Vibe described it as "sultry", while Salon's Thomas Bartlett commented that the song is "strange, sad and astonishingly good." A Rolling Stone writer preferred Alamaze's version over the Pussycat Dolls'. Stylus Magazine included it on their ranking of the best singles from 2005 at number 30, adding that "at the core, Alamaze remains defiantly sexy over a tight bump-n-grind rhythm."

=== Charts ===
Weekly chart performance for "Don't Cha"
Chart (2005)	Peak position
US Bubbling Under Hot 100 Singles (Billboard)	2
US Hot R&B/Hip-Hop Songs (Billboard)	53
US Rhythmic (Billboard)	20

=== Release history ===
Release dates and formats for "Don't Cha"
Region	Date	Format(s)	Label(s)	Ref.
United States	November 30, 2004	Urban contemporary radio	Universal	

== The Pussycat Dolls version ==
"Don't Cha"
- One of US artworks

Single by The Pussycat Dolls featuring Busta Rhymes

from the album PCD
- Released: April 19, 2005
- Genre: R&B
- Length: 4:47 (single version); 4:32 (album version); 4:03 (radio edit; no rap)
- Label: A&M
- Songwriters: Anthony Ray; Thomas Callaway; Trevor Smith
- Producer: Cee-Lo Green

The Pussycat Dolls singles chronology
"Don't Cha" (2005)	"Stickwitu" (2005)

Busta Rhymes singles chronology
"What's Happenin'" (2004)	"Don't Cha" (2005)	"Where's Your Money?" (2005)

Music video
- "Don't Cha" on YouTube

Alternative cover
- Non-US artwork, later used in 2020s US reissue An editor has nominated the above file for discussion of its purpose and/or potential deletion. You are welcome to participate in the discussion and help reach a consensus.

In 2004, choreographer Robin Antin had struck a joint venture with Interscope Records to develop the Pussycat Dolls, a burlesque cabaret act that was performing in various venues in Hollywood, into a brand. In cooperation with then-chairman of Interscope Geffen A&M Records, Jimmy Iovine, and record producer Ron Fair, Antin formed a separate group consisting of six members based on the burlesque dance revue created by Antin. To successfully transition into a major-label recording act, Fair felt it would be best to deviate from "straight-ahead burlesque" and transition into a more traditional pop group with contemporary R&B influences. At the suggestion of Doug Morris,—then chairman of Universal Music Group—"Don't Cha" was given to the Pussycat Dolls as the label was trying to reinvent the girl group. They asked Green to rerecord the song with the Pussycat Dolls, who was initially skeptical. "I didn't know too much about them, but when I found out that [Universal-owned] Interscope Records was involved, that was an alliance I didn't hesitate to make." "Don't Cha" was initially offered to both Sugababes and Paris Hilton, but both declined. In 2006, Hilton claimed that she was presented with the track, but was not impressed with it. "I think I did hear the song, but not in the format that we all came to know and love. If I'd heard that, of course I'd have jumped at the chance". The song is considered to be the group's signature hit.

=== Composition ===
"Don't Cha" is an R&B song that lasts four minutes and thirty-two seconds. The song was written by Thomas Callaway, Anthony Ray, and Trevor Smith and produced by Callaway. According to the sheet music published by Sony/ATV Music Publishing, "Don't Cha" was composed using common time in the key of B♭ minor, and set in a moderate hip hop tempo of 120 beats per minute. Naomi West described Busta Rhymes' rap as "garrulous".

Speaking of their collaboration, Scherzinger said, "He is so much fun. He's so humble and he just makes you feel good. We are so grateful that [Busta] did it and was a part of it with us. We feel blessed." The song's lyrics are about "taunting a hapless man with the lyrics, "Don't cha wish your girlfriend was hot like me / Don't cha wish your girlfriend was a freak like me". The chorus of the song is based on Sir Mix-a-Lot's song "Swass" (1988). Maeve McDermott distinguished "Don't Cha" from other girl group songs like the Spice Girls' "Wannabe", Destiny's Child's "Independent Women Part I" and TLC's "No Scrubs" which promote female camaraderie. Marisa Meltzer of The Daily Beast felt that the song's lyrics "put forward the belief that a woman's worth lies solely in her appearance and sexual permissiveness and just furthers the notion that women are in competition with one another over men."

=== Reception ===
==== Reviews ====
"Don't Cha" received mainly positive reviews. Sal Cinquemani of described the song as "brassy and sassy" adding that, "the Pussycat Dolls have certainly carved a niche for themselves in 21st century pop history. Stephen Thomas Erlewine also favored the song saying "there has never been a sex song quite as knowingly ironic yet undeniably sexy as this." Writing for musicOMH, John Murphy described "Don't Cha" as "a silky, sexy little number that will become ubiquitous by the end of the month." However, he added that Busta Rhymes is annoying. "It's a shame that Busta Rhymes is as typically annoying as ever, but he doesn't spoil the song too much." Spence D. from IGN wrote that the track's "sultry swagger-n-shuffle is the type of stuff that nasty boys and girls might enjoy grinding to." A reviewer from Contactmusic.com gave the song 4 out 5 stars favoring the "serious dose of high energy and raunchy message," while criticized the song for not having "any vocal talent." Lisa Haines from BBC described the track as "memorable". She continued saying "[it's] a groovy R&B duet with Busta Rhymes, is easily the best." Isaac McCalla from About.com praised the song. "This single is a serious dose of high energy, wickedly fun and slammin' house music." Azeem Ahmad also from musicOMH in a separate review commented, "strangely enough 'Don't Cha' isn't purely eye candy." However, he was critical stating: "not even Busta Rhymes' cameo appearance can prevent 'Don't Cha' from seeming like nothing more than a promo for some generic product aimed at young males." Chuck Arnold and Ralph Novak of People magazine wrote that the group is "responsible for [2005's] guiltiest pleasure."

==== Accolades and recognition ====
The song was nominated for Top Selling Single of the Year at the 2005 Billboard Music Awards. At the 2006 Billboard R&B/Hip-Hop Awards the song won the award in the category for Hot R&B/Hip-hop Songs Sales. At the 21st International Dance Music Awards, the song was nominated in the Best R&B/Urban Dance Track and Best Pop Dance Track categories, winning the former. In May and August the song was listed as one of the recipients of the Broadcast Music, Inc. (BMI) Pop Awards and Urban Awards. The same year, the song was nominated for Best R&B/Soul Single, Group, Band or Duo at the 2006 Soul Train Music Awards.

VH1 ranked "Don't Cha" at number 96 on their list of the 100 Greatest Songs of the 2000s. The Daily Telegraph listed the song at number 58 on the "100 songs that defined the Noughties." Billboard magazine ranked "Don't Cha" at number 30 on their list of the 100 Greatest Girl Group Songs of All Time; Frank Digiacomo wrote that, despite Tori Alamaze exuding "the sinewy sexual tension that the song's refrain, [...] It took the star power of the Dolls, to get it all the way to [number two]." Based on chart performance on the Billboard Hot 100, "Don't Cha" is the 29th most successful song by a girl group on the chart.

In September 2011, Billboard ranked "Don't Cha" third best song of the Summer of 2005. To acknowledge the most popular films, television shows, celebrities and music of the 2000s decade, "Don't Cha" was featured in VH1's I Love the 2000s. Billboard also ranked the song number 29 on the list of Top 40 Girl Group Songs Of All Time, and third on the Favorite Girl Group Single poll the same week. "Don't Cha" has appeared on multiple Fuse countdowns including number 41 on Girls Who Run The World, number 51 on Top 100 Pop Breakthroughs, number 14 on Top 100 Sexy Beats. and number 17 on 4Music's Biggest R&B Hits of the Naughties.

=== Chart performance ===
In the United States, "Don't Cha" debuted at number 95 on the Billboard Hot 100 on the issue dated May 7, 2005. In its tenth week, "Don't Cha" entered the top ten at number eight. The track reached number two in its sixteenth week, becoming their highest-charting single in the country. The song stayed there for three consecutive weeks, behind Mariah Carey's smash "We Belong Together". Despite the song not reaching the top position on the Billboard Hot 100, it reached number one spot on the Hot Dance Club Play and Pop 100 and charts for three and seven consecutive weeks respectively. "Don't Cha" set the record for the highest-charting single by a girl group on Billboard's Hot Digital Songs. "Don't Cha" took three-and-a-half years to reach the two million mark in paid downloads, and by May 2011 the song has sold three million copies according to Nielsen Soundscan. The song was certified quintuple platinum by the Recording Industry Association of America (RIAA), for sales of five million units.

In Australia, "Don't Cha" debuted at number one on the ARIA Singles Chart and remained in the pole position for seven non-consecutive weeks between August and September earning the group a distinction for having the longest stay at number one since Eminem's "Lose Yourself" which topped the chart for 12 weeks in 2002–03. Moreover, it was one of the three songs to remain in the top ten for 14 weeks. It has been certified double times platinum by the Australian Recording Industry Association (ARIA). In New Zealand, the song reached number one in its first week and spent more than half of its time on the chart in the top ten. It was certified gold, selling over 7,500 copies, according to the Recording Industry Association of New Zealand (RIANZ).

Across Europe, "Don't Cha" was a massive hit, topping the European Hot 100 Singles for four weeks, alongside Germany, Flanders (Belgium), Denmark, Austria, Norway, Switzerland. The single reached top ten in others Euro countries, including Italy, France, the Netherlands, Sweden, Hungary and Finland. In the United Kingdom, prior its single release "Don't Cha" peaked at number 44 on import. The following week, the song peaked at the top of the UK singles chart, making the Pussycat Dolls the first American female group to top the UK singles chart since Destiny's Child's "Survivor" (2001) and the first single under A&M Records to reach number one since Black Eyed Peas and Justin Timberlake's "Where Is the Love? (2003). It sold 85,021 copies, displacing the Gorillaz' "Dare" by nearly four times as many sales. In its second week, the song the single had a decline in sales of 23% to 65,122 copies, but remained on the top outselling the rest of the singles by a margin of greater than two to one as PCD debuted at number eight on the UK Albums Chart. In its final week atop, sales dipped by 31.1% selling 44,897 copies, surpassing 195,164 copies after 20 days, and becoming the seventh highest seller of the year at that point. The British Phonographic Industry (BPI) awarded a platinum certification to the track for shipping 600,000 copies in the UK. According to the Official Charts Company (OCC), "Don't Cha" is the 147th best-selling single of the 21st century. As of March 2026, "Don't Cha" remains the group's best-selling single, with combined sales of 1.58 Million.

In Ireland, the song debuted at number one on the Irish Singles Chart and stayed for four consecutive weeks. The song has also reached the peak in a number of European countries including Belgium (Flanders), Germany, Norway and Switzerland. According to Nielsen Soundscan, by the end of 2005 "Don't Cha" was the tenth best selling song in digital downloads across Europe.

=== Music video ===
The music video for "Don't Cha" was filmed during the week of April 11, 2005, by Paul Hunter. During an interview with MTV News, Scherzinger elaborated that the video focuses on confidence and fun. "The lyrics are: 'Don't Cha wish your girlfriend was hot like me,' But if you see the video, it's all about being who you are, having fun and being confident – and feeling hot. It's not so much about looking hot ... although looking hot is important." Scherzinger further praised Busta Rhymes for their collaboration on the set of music video, saying "Busta Rhymes is pretty phat, man. He is so much fun. He's so humble and he just makes you feel good. When you're around him, you feel magical. [...] We are so grateful that [Busta] did it and was a part of it with us."

The video begins with the Pussycat Dolls drag racing on jeeps, one of which is a Ford Bronco, in the Los Angeles River. Then, the group is seen arriving at an underground party where they do different activities such as jumping on a trampoline. The video is inter-cut with sequences of close-ups of the girls and Rhymes performing the song, while impromptu dance routines are featured on the chorus. Inspired by pole-dancing, the dance routine also includes a move called the slutdrop. The music video is credited as the origin of the slutdrop, which later became popular among contemporary female artists. Throughout the video Scherzinger is seen wearing a hoodie that emblazons the song's lyrics are emblazons across the top while the other members are wearing "barely there miniskirts and bare midriffs." The Pussycat Dolls' creator Robin Antin and the song's producer CeeLo Green make cameo appearances towards the end.

==== Reception and accolades ====
The music video was widely popular, receiving heavy rotation on MTV, and established the group as mainstays for subsequent videos. VH1 listed "Don't Cha" as the fourteenth most viewed video of 2005. Billy Johnson Jr. of Yahoo! Music wrote that the video is "a fantasy come true" adding "front and center, the stunning Nicole Scherzinger, surrounded by good company, pranced around in tank tops and short shorts while drag racing in convertible jeeps. They raised the bar." Richard Harrington of The Washington Post described the video as "hot-hot-hot." The Wall Street Journal's Ethan Smith commented that the video "is somewhat less racy than the average hip-hop video." Naomi West of The Telegraph wrote that the video "is no more titillating than any of Jennifer Lopez's or Beyoncé's, and a good deal less than Christina Aguilera's sweat-drenched 'Dirrty' promo." Billboard regarded it as the best music video of the Pussycat Dolls career.

In 2005, it won Best Video at the Smash Hits Poll Winners Party. The following year, it earned nominations for Best R&B Video at the 2006 MTV Australia Video Music Awards, Best International Video – Group and People's Choice: Favourite International Group at the 2006 MuchMusic Video Awards, and Best Dance Video at the 21st Annual International Dance Music Awards. Billboard's Andrew Unterberger included the music video on its list of "Top 10 Most Iconic Girl Group Music Videos" commenting that "it was inevitable that the song and video would become massive, and become massive they did" as "Don't Cha" presented them "as a virtually unstoppable army of seduction."

=== Live performances ===
On May 14, 2005, the Pussycat Dolls closed KIIS-FM's Wango Tango at the Angel Stadium in Los Angeles, California with "Don't Cha". Prior their performance Scherzinger said, "We are so psyched [to play tonight]. We can't wait. It's going to be amazing." MTV's Brandee J. Tecson commented, "like a lot of the day's performers, the Dolls were newcomers to the Wango stage, but ended the night like veterans." On August 14, 2005, The Pussycat Dolls performed "Don't Cha" at the 2005 Teen Choice Awards. On November 4, 2005, the group appeared at the 2005 MTV Europe Music Awards at the Pavilhão Atlântico in Lisbon, Portugal, and performed "Don't Cha" with a house remix at the end. On December 7, 2005, the Pussycat Dolls performed at the annual KIIS-FM Jingle Ball at the Shrine Auditorium in Los Angeles, California with some members wearing "festive candy-cane-striped belly shirts and red-and-green capri pants." The set list included "Don't Cha", 'Stickwitu" and "Wait a Minute".

On January 27, 2006, during the results show of Dancing with the Stars the Pussycat Dolls performed "Sway" and "Don't Cha". On June 30, 2006, The Pussycat Dolls performed on Good Morning America as part of its Summer Concert Series along with "Buttons" and "Stickwitu". Busta Rhymes included the song on his set list while opening for Mariah Carey's The Adventures of Mimi tour. On July 7, 2007, The Pussycat Dolls together with other artists performed at the Live Earth Concerts, which were held to raise awareness of global warming. They performed "Don't Cha", "Stickwitu", and "Buttons". The group then performed the song at the Walmart Soundcheck, along with "I Hate This Part", "Buttons", "When I Grow Up" and "Takin' Over the World". The Pussycat Dolls also performed "Don't Cha" at the Doll Domination Tour (2009). Maureen Ellis of the Evening Times said that the "high-energy encore of 'Don't Cha' and 'When I Grow Up' ensured the Dolls reigned supreme."

On November 30, 2019, the Pussycat Dolls reunited on The X Factor: Celebrity finale, marking their first live performance together in a decade and performed a medley of "Buttons", "When I Grow Up", "Don't Cha", and "React". Shortly after, British media regulator Ofcom received 400 complaints from viewers who criticized band's revealing outfits and provocative choreography. On February 22, 2020, the group appeared on series sixteen of Ant & Dec's Saturday Night Takeaway, and performed "Don't Cha as part of a medley with "Buttons", "Beep" and "React". The performance was set within the context of a comedy sketch where they poked fun at the controversy that aroused following their The X Factor: Celebrity performance. As part of the performance, a TV test card flashed up on screen from ITV reading "we're sorry for the disruption… we're working hard to fix the issue and will return to normal family-friendly, not at all sexy, uncontroversial programming soon." The test card was revealed to be a backdrop which the group jumped through.

=== Cover versions ===
American singer Colbie Caillat performed "Don't Cha" throughout her US tour in support of her second studio album, Breakthrough (2009). In 2019, Ezra Miller's band, Sons of an Illustrious Father, recorded their own version of "Don't Cha" with the intent to "ridicule and invert" the heterosexual nature of the tune. The accompanying music video was filmed in an empty warehouse where the band members are dressed in black leotards and are dancing against dim, colorful neon lights.

In 2006, "Weird Al" Yankovic covered part of the song as part of one of his polka parodies, "Polkarama" from Straight Outta Lynwood.

The song was used in the 2011 film Gnomeo & Juliet.

=== Track listings and formats ===
- Australian, German and UK maxi CD single
1. "Don't Cha" (main mix) (featuring Busta Rhymes) – 4:47
2. "Don't Cha" (More Booty Mix) (featuring Busta Rhymes) – 4:48
3. "Don't Cha" (radio edit) – 4:02
4. "Don't Cha" (music video)
- German and UK CD single
1. "Don't Cha" (main mix) (featuring Busta Rhymes) – 4:47
2. "Don't Cha" (radio edit) – 4:02
- US CD single and 12-inch vinyl
1. "Don't Cha" (radio edit) (featuring Busta Rhymes) – 3:40
2. "Don't Cha" (radio edit) – 4:02
- US maxi CD single
1. "Don't Cha" (Ralphi's Hot Freak Radio Mix) – 4:17
2. "Don't Cha" (Kaskade Radio Edit) – 3:34
3. "Don't Cha" (Ralphi's Hot Freak 12" Vox Mix) – 9:52
4. "Don't Cha" (Kaskade Club Mix) – 6:48
5. "Don't Cha" (DJ Dan's Sqweegee Dub) – 8:20
- UK 12-inch vinyl
1. "Don't Cha" (main mix) (featuring Busta Rhymes) – 4:47
2. "Don't Cha" (radio edit) – 4:02
3. "Don't Cha" (instrumental) – 4:43

=== Credits and personnel ===
Credits adapted from the liner notes of PCD.

Sample

- Contains interpolations of "Swass" performed and written by Sir Mix-a-Lot.

Personnel

- Steve Baughman – mixing
- Bill Churchville – trumpet
- The Pussycat Dolls – primary artist
- CeeLo Green – songwriter, producer
- John Goux – guitar
- Ray Herrmann – saxophone
- Nick Lane – trombone
- Ethan Mates – engineer
- Anthony "Sir Mix-a-Lot" Ray – songwriter
- Busta Rhymes – songwriter, featured artist
- Chris Tedesco – trumpet and horn contractor

=== Charts ===
==== Weekly charts ====
Weekly chart performance for "Don't Cha"
Chart (2005–2006)	Peak position
Australia (ARIA)	1
Australian Club (ARIA)	11
Australian Urban (ARIA)	1
Austria (Ö3 Austria Top 40)	1
Belgium (Ultratop 50 Flanders)	1
Belgium (Ultratop 50 Wallonia)	4
Canada (Nielsen SoundScan)	1
Canada CHR/Pop Top 30 (Radio & Records)	4
Canada Hot AC Top 30 (Radio & Records)	27
CIS Airplay (TopHit)	36
Czech Republic Airplay (ČNS IFPI)	8
Denmark (Tracklisten)	1
European Hot 100 Singles (Billboard)	1
Finland (Suomen virallinen lista)	7
France (SNEP)	6
Germany (GfK)	1
Greece (IFPI)	9
Hungary (Rádiós Top 40)	6
Hungary (Dance Top 40)	1
Ireland (IRMA)	1
Italy (FIMI)	5
Netherlands (Dutch Top 40)	2
Netherlands (Single Top 100)	2
New Zealand (Recorded Music NZ)	1
Norway (VG-lista)	1
Romania (Romanian Top 100)	1
Russia Airplay (TopHit)	25
Scottish Singles Sales (Official Charts)	1
Sweden (Sverigetopplistan)	5
Switzerland (Schweizer Hitparade)	1
UK Singles (Official Charts)	1
UK Airplay (Music Week)	3
UK Hip Hop/R&B (Official Charts)	1
US Billboard Hot 100	2
US Dance Club Songs (Billboard) R. Rosario/Kaskade/DJ Dan Mixes	1
US Dance Singles Sales (Billboard) R. Rosario/Kaskade/DJ Dan Mixes	1
US Dance Airplay (Billboard)	1
US Hot R&B/Hip-Hop Songs (Billboard)	8
US Pop Airplay (Billboard)	2
US Pop 100 (Billboard)	1
US Rhythmic Airplay (Billboard)	15

==== Year-end charts ====
2005 year-end chart performance for "Don't Cha"
Chart (2005)	Position
Australia (ARIA)	2
Australian Urban (ARIA)	1
Austria (Ö3 Austria Top 40)	11
Belgium (Ultratop 50 Flanders)	12
Belgium (Ultratop 50 Wallonia)	22
CIS (TopHit)	84
European Hot 100 Singles (Billboard)	2
France (SNEP)	37
Germany (Media Control GfK)	8
Hungary (Rádiós Top 40)	67
Ireland (IRMA)	7
Italy (FIMI)	27
Netherlands (Dutch Top 40)	15
Netherlands (Single Top 100)	16
New Zealand (RIANZ)	5
Romania (Romanian Top 100)	30
Russia Airplay (TopHit)	107
Sweden (Hitlistan)	31
Switzerland (Schweizer Hitparade)	5
UK Singles (OCC)	5
UK Airplay (Music Week)	25
UK Urban (Music Week)	19
US Billboard Hot 100	9
US Dance Club Play (Billboard)	1
US Dance Singles Sales (Billboard)	2
US Hot Dance Airplay (Billboard)	7
US Pop 100 (Billboard)	5

2006 year-end chart performance for "Don't Cha"
Chart (2006)	Position
Brazil (Crowley)	2
European Hot 100 Singles (Billboard)	77
Germany (Media Control GfK)	95
Hungary (Dance Top 40)	36
Hungary (Rádiós Top 40)	64
UK Singles (OCC)	125

==== Decade-end charts ====
Decade-end chart performance for "Don't Cha"
Chart (2000–2009)	Position
Australia (ARIA)	31
Germany (Media Control GfK)	90
UK Singles (OCC)	73
US Dance Club Songs (Billboard)	16

==== Century charts ====
Century chart performance for "Don't Cha"
Chart (21st century)	Position
UK Singles (OCC)	147

=== Certifications and sales ===
Region	Certification	Certified units/sales
Australia (ARIA)	2× Platinum	140,000^{^}
Austria (IFPI Austria)	Gold	15,000^{*}
Belgium (BRMA)	Gold	25,000^{*}
Brazil (Pro-Música Brasil) DMS	Gold	30,000^{*}
Brazil (Pro-Música Brasil)	Platinum	60,000^{‡}
Denmark (IFPI Danmark)	Platinum	8,000^{^}
Germany (BVMI)	2× Platinum	600,000^{‡}
Italy (FIMI) sales since 2009	Gold	50,000^{‡}
New Zealand (RMNZ)	4× Platinum	120,000^{‡}
Spain (Promusicae)	Gold	30,000^{‡}
Sweden (GLF)	Gold	10,000^{^}
Switzerland (IFPI Switzerland)	Gold	20,000^{^}
United Kingdom (BPI)	2× Platinum	1,580,000
United States (RIAA)	5× Platinum	5,000,000^{‡}
United States (RIAA) Mastertone	Platinum	1,000,000^{*}
^{*} Sales figures based on certification alone.^{^} Shipments figures based on certification alone.^{‡} Sales+streaming figures based on certification alone.

=== Release history ===
Release dates and formats for "Don't Cha"
Region	Date	Format(s)	Label(s)	Ref.
United States	April 19, 2005	Contemporary hit radio; digital download; rhythmic contemporary radio	A&M; Interscope	
United States	April 26, 2005	12-inch vinyl; CD	A&M; Interscope	
United States	July 26, 2005	Digital download (EP); maxi CD	A&M; Interscope	
Australia	August 22, 2005	Maxi CD	Universal Music	
Germany	August 29, 2005	Maxi CD	Universal Music	
Germany	September 5, 2005	12-inch vinyl; CD	Universal Music	
United Kingdom	September 5, 2005	Maxi CD	Polydor	
France	September 19, 2005	CD	Universal Music	

== See also ==
- List of best-selling singles of the 2000s (decade) in the United Kingdom
- List of best-selling singles of the 2000s in Australia
- List of Billboard Hot 100 top-ten singles in 2005
- List of Billboard Hot Dance Club Play number ones of 2005
- List of European number-one hits of 2005
- List of number-one dance airplay hits of 2005 (U.S.)
- List of number-one hits of 2005 (Germany)
- List of number-one singles from the 2000s (New Zealand)
- List of number-one singles of 2005 (Australia)
- List of number-one singles of 2005 (Canada)
- List of number-one singles of 2005 (Ireland)
- List of number-one singles of the 2000s (Switzerland)
- List of Romanian Top 100 number ones
- List of UK singles chart number ones of the 2000s
- List of UK top-ten singles in 2005
- List of Ultratop 50 number-one singles of 2005
