= Will.i.am discography =

will.i.am discography
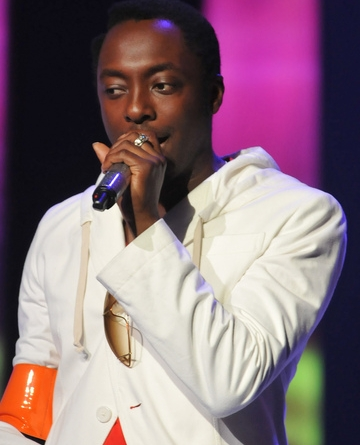
- will.i.am performing at the 2011 Walmart Shareholders Meeting at the Walton Arena in Fayetteville, Arkansas
- Studio albums: 4
- Compilation albums: 1
- Singles: 59
- Music videos: 58
- Promotional singles: 9

American musician will.i.am has released four studio albums, one compilation, 59 singles (including 42 as a featured artist), nine promotional singles, and 58 music videos.

will.i.am's debut album, Lost Change, was released in October 2001 on Atlantic Records. The album spawned one single, "I Am". His second studio album, Must B 21, was released on September 23, 2003. No singles were released from the album. His third album, Songs About Girls, was released on September 25, 2007. The album's first single was "I Got It from My Mama", which peaked at number 31 on the US Billboard Hot 100. The album also spawned the singles, "Heartbreaker" and "One More Chance". His fourth studio album, #willpower, was released on April 19, 2013. Will.i.am released the single "T.H.E. (The Hardest Ever)", featuring American singer Jennifer Lopez and British musician Mick Jagger in 2012. It peaked at number 36 on the Billboard Hot 100 and number three on the UK Singles Chart. Three singles have been released from #willpower: "This Is Love", topped the Irish and UK singles charts; "Scream & Shout" – a collaboration with American singer Britney Spears – which topped numerous singles charts worldwide and became his first solo single to reach the top 10 of the Billboard Hot 100, peaking at number three; and "#thatPOWER", with Canadian singer Justin Bieber.

== Albums ==
=== Studio albums ===
List of studio albums, with selected chart positions, sales figures and certifications
Title	Album details	Peak chart positions										Sales	Certifications
Title	Album details	US	US R&B	US Rap	AUS	FRA	IRL	NLD	NZ	SWI	UK	Sales	Certifications
Lost Change	Released: October 2, 2001; Label: Atlantic Records; Format: CD, digital download	—	—	—	—	—	—	—	—	—	—		
Must B 21	Released: September 23, 2003; Label: Atlantic Records, Beat Generation, will.i.am; Format: CD, digital download	—	—	—	—	—	—	—	—	—	—		
Songs About Girls	Released: September 25, 2007; Label: Interscope, will.i.am; Format: CD, digital download	38	14	9	58	89	—	—	—	27	68		
#willpower	Released: April 23, 2013; Label: Interscope, will.i.am; Format: CD, digital download	9	—	—	9	5	5	25	5	10	3	US: 64,000	BPI: Gold; RMNZ: Platinum
"—" denotes releases that did not chart or were not released in that territory.

=== Compilation albums ===
List of compilation albums
Title	Album details
The Black Eyed Peas Family Best	Released: June 9, 2008; Label: Universal; Format: CD, digital download

== Singles ==
=== As lead artist ===
List of singles as lead artist, with selected chart positions and certifications, showing year released and album name
Title	Year	Peak chart positions										Certifications	Album
Title	Year	US	AUS	CAN	FRA	GER	IRL	NLD	NZ	SWI	UK	Certifications	Album
"I Am"	2001	—	—	—	—	—	—	—	—	—	—		Lost Change
"Take It" (featuring KRS-One)	2004	—	—	—	—	—	—	—	—	—	—		Must B 21
"I Got It from My Mama"	2007	31	19	18	49	33	—	46	—	77	38		Songs About Girls
"One More Chance"	2007	—	—	—	—	—	—	—	—	—	97		Songs About Girls
"The Girl Is Mine 2008" (with Michael Jackson)	2008	—	60	76	22	21	38	12	—	47	32		Thriller 25
"Heartbreaker" (featuring Cheryl Cole)	2008	—	—	—	—	—	7	—	—	—	4	BPI: Gold	Songs About Girls
"Check It Out" (with Nicki Minaj)	2010	24	21	14	—	—	14	67	—	—	11	BPI: Silver	Pink Friday
"T.H.E. (The Hardest Ever)" (featuring Jennifer Lopez and Mick Jagger)	2011	36	57	10	—	—	13	—	—	41	3	BPI: Silver	Non-album single
"Great Times"	2011	—	—	—	—	—	—	—	—	—	—		#willpower
"This Is Love" (featuring Eva Simons)	2012	— (Note: "This Is Love" did not enter the Billboard Hot 100, but peaked at number 10 on the Bubbling Under Hot 100 Singles chart, which acts as an extension to the Hot 100.)	7	14	2	54	1	2	5	8	1	ARIA: 2× Platinum; BPI: Gold; IFPI SWI: Gold; RMNZ: Platinum	#willpower
"Scream & Shout" (with Britney Spears)	2012	3	2	1	1	1	1	1	1	1	1	RIAA: 3× Platinum; ARIA: 6× Platinum; BPI: 2× Platinum; BVMI: 4× Platinum; IFPI SWI: 2× Platinum; RMNZ: 3× Platinum; SNEP: Platinum	#willpower
"#thatPower" (featuring Justin Bieber)	2013	17	6	6	11	7	5	17	16	23	2	ARIA: 2× Platinum; BPI: Gold; BVMI: Gold; RMNZ: Platinum	#willpower
"Fall Down" (featuring Miley Cyrus)	2013	58	14	15	43	48	17	—	15	59	34	ARIA: Platinum; RMNZ: Platinum	#willpower
"Bang Bang"	2013	—	84	—	53	—	14	—	—	—	3	BPI: Platinum	#willpower
"Feelin' Myself" (featuring Miley Cyrus, French Montana and Wiz Khalifa)	2013	96	34	—	50	55	3	—	16	—	2	BPI: Platinum; RMNZ: Platinum	#willpower
"It's My Birthday" (featuring Cody Wise)	2014	—	4	—	167	41	25	—	16	—	1	ARIA: Platinum; BPI: Platinum; BVMI: Gold; RMNZ: Gold	Non-album singles
"Boys & Girls" (featuring Pia Mia)	2016	—	53	—	46	39	42	—	—	—	21	BPI: Silver	Non-album singles
"Solo" (with Willy William and Lali)	2022	—	—	—	—	—	—	—	—	—	—		Non-album singles
"The Formula" (with Lil Wayne)	2023	—	—	—	—	—	—	—	—	—	—		Non-album singles
"Mind Your Business" (with Britney Spears)	2023	—	—	—	—	—	—	26	— (Note: "Mind Your Business" did not enter the NZ Top 40 Singles Chart, but peaked at number 27 on the NZ Hot Singles Chart.)	—	— (Note: "Mind Your Business" did not enter the UK Singles Top 100 Chart but debuted and peaked at number 10 on the UK Singles Downloads Chart Top 100 Chart on 28 July 2023.)		Non-album singles
"East LA" (with Taboo)	2025	—	—	—	—	—	—	—	—	—	—		Non-album singles
"—" denotes releases that did not chart or were not released in that territory.

=== As featured artist ===
List of singles as featured artist, with selected chart positions and certifications, showing year released and album name
Title	Year	Peak chart positions										Certifications	Album
Title	Year	US	US R&B	AUS	CAN	GER	IRL	NLD	NZ	SWI	UK	Certifications	Album
"Vocal Artillery" (Ozomatli featuring Medusa, will.i.am and Kanetic Source)	2001	—	—	—	—	—	—	—	—	—	—		Embrace the Chaos
"Sunny Hours" (Long Beach Dub All Stars featuring will.i.am)	2001	—	—	—	—	—	—	—	—	—	—		Wonders of the World
"La Patte" (Saïan Supa Crew featuring will.i.am)	2005	—	—	—	—	—	—	—	—	—	—		Hold Up
"Beep" (The Pussycat Dolls featuring will.i.am)	2005	13	—	3	3	5	2	2	1	6	2	ARIA: Gold; BPI: Silver; BVMI: Gold; RMNZ: Gold	PCD
"I Love My Bitch" (Busta Rhymes featuring Kelis and will.i.am)	2006	41	18	22	—	38	18	43	8	22	8		The Big Bang
"That Heat" (Sérgio Mendes featuring Erykah Badu and will.i.am)	2006	—	—	—	—	—	—	—	—	—	—		Timeless
"Keep Bouncin'" (Too Short featuring will.i.am and Snoop Dogg)	2006	—	93	—	—	—	—	—	—	—	—		Blow the Whistle
"Fergalicious" (Fergie featuring will.i.am)	2006	2	71	4	24	23	38	35	5	29	105	RIAA: 4× Platinum; RIAA: Platinum (Mastertone); ARIA: 2× Platinum; BPI: Gold; BVMI: Gold; RMNZ: 2× Platinum	The Dutchess
"Hip Hop Is Dead" (Nas featuring will.i.am)	2006	41	48	84	—	84	27	—	28	—	36		Hip Hop Is Dead
"A Dream" (Common featuring will.i.am)	2006	—	— (Note: "A Dream" did not enter the Hot R&B/Hip-Hop Songs chart, but peaked at number 16 on the Bubbling Under R&B/Hip-Hop Singles chart, which acts as an extension to the Hot R&B/Hip-Hop Songs chart.)	—	—	—	—	—	—	—	108		Freedom Writers soundtrack
"Baby Love" (Nicole Scherzinger featuring will.i.am)	2007	— (Note: "Baby Love" did not enter the Billboard Hot 100, but peaked at number eight on the Bubbling Under Hot 100 Singles chart, which acts as an extension to the Hot 100.)	—	58	—	5	15	56	—	14	14		Non-album single
"Hot Thing" (Talib Kweli featuring will.i.am)	2007	—	— (Note: "Hot Thing" did not enter the Hot R&B/Hip-Hop Songs chart, but peaked at number two on the Bubbling Under R&B/Hip-Hop Singles chart, which acts as an extension to the Hot R&B/Hip-Hop Songs chart.)	—	—	—	—	—	—	—	—		Eardrum
"Wait a Minute (Just a Touch)" (Estelle featuring will.i.am)	2007	—	—	—	—	—	—	—	—	—	—		Shine
"Be OK" (Chrisette Michele featuring will.i.am)	2007	—	61	—	—	—	—	—	—	—	—		I Am
"I Want You" (Common featuring will.i.am)	2007	— (Note: "I Want You" did not enter the Billboard Hot 100, but peaked at number 12 on the Bubbling Under Hot 100 Singles chart, which acts as an extension to the Hot 100.)	32	—	—	—	—	—	—	—	—		Finding Forever
"In the Ayer" (Flo Rida featuring will.i.am)	2008	9	— (Note: "In the Ayer" did not enter the Hot R&B/Hip-Hop Songs chart, but peaked at number five on the Bubbling Under R&B/Hip-Hop Singles chart, which acts as an extension to the Hot R&B/Hip-Hop Songs chart.)	19	13	50	13	—	9	—	29	RIAA: 2× Platinum; MC: Platinum	Mail on Sunday
"Funky Bahia" (Sérgio Mendes featuring will.i.am and Siedah Garrett)	2008	—	—	—	—	—	—	93	—	—	—		Encanto
"What's Your Name" (Usher featuring will.i.am)	2008	—	—	91	84	—	—	—	—	—	—		Here I Stand
"All My Life (In the Ghetto)" (Jay Rock featuring Lil Wayne and will.i.am)	2008	—	— (Note: "All My Life (In the Ghetto)" did not enter the Hot R&B/Hip-Hop Songs chart, but peaked at number 10 on the Bubbling Under R&B/Hip-Hop Singles chart, which acts as an extension to the Hot R&B/Hip-Hop Songs chart.)	—	—	—	—	—	—	—	—		Follow Me Home
"Touch Your Button (Carnival Jam)" (Wyclef Jean featuring will.i.am and Melissa Jiménez)	2008	—	—	—	—	—	—	—	—	—	—		Carnival Vol. II: Memoirs of an Immigrant
"Straighten Up and Fly Right" (Nat King Cole featuring Natalie Cole and will.i.am)	2009	—	—	—	—	—	—	—	—	—	—		Re: Generations
"3 Words" (Cheryl Cole featuring will.i.am)	2009	—	—	5	—	27	7	32	—	—	4	ARIA: 2× Platinum; BPI: Silver	3 Words
"I'm in the House" (Steve Aoki featuring will.i.am as Zuper Blahq)	2010	—	—	—	—	—	—	40	—	—	29		Non-album single
"OMG" (Usher featuring will.i.am)	2010	1	3	1	2	27	1	39	1	38	1	RIAA: 8× Platinum; ARIA: 6× Platinum; BPI: Platinum; BVMI: Gold; MC: 2× Platinum; RMNZ: 2× Platinum	Raymond v. Raymond
"Wavin' Flag" (Celebration Mix) (K'naan featuring will.i.am and David Guetta)	2010	—	—	—	—	—	—	—	—	—	—	MC: 3× Platinum; IFPI SWI: 2× Platinum; BPI: Platinum; BVMI: 3× Gold	Troubadour: Champion Edition
"Forever" (Wolfgang Gartner featuring will.i.am)	2011	—	—	—	—	—	—	—	—	—	43		Weekend in America
"Free" (Natalia Kills featuring will.i.am)	2011	—	—	—	—	15	—	96	—	—	118	BVMI: Gold	Perfectionist
"Hall of Fame" (The Script featuring will.i.am)	2012	25	—	4	25	2	1	16	3	3	1	RIAA: 2× Platinum; ARIA: 10× Platinum; BPI: 4× Platinum; BVMI: 2× Platinum; IFPI SWI: 2× Platinum; NVPI: Gold; RMNZ: 5× Platinum	#3
"In My City" (Priyanka Chopra featuring will.i.am)	2012	—	—	—	—	—	—	—	—	—	—		Non-album singles
"Problem" (The Monster Remix) (Becky G featuring will.i.am)	2012	—	—	—	—	—	—	—	—	—	—		Non-album singles
"Burn the Disco" (Felix da Housecat featuring will.i.am)	2012	—	—	—	—	—	—	—	—	—	—		Non-album singles
"Better Than Yesterday" (Sidney Samson featuring will.i.am)	2012	—	—	—	—	—	—	84	—	—	—		Non-album singles
"Crazy Kids" (Kesha featuring will.i.am)	2013	40	—	32	48	56	14	—	—	—	27	RIAA: Platinum; ARIA: Gold	Non-album singles
"Something Really Bad" (Dizzee Rascal featuring will.i.am)	2013	—	—	—	—	65	—	—	—	—	10		The Fifth
"Provocative" (Brit Smith featuring will.i.am)	2013	—	—	—	—	—	—	—	—	—	—		Non-album single
"It Should Be Easy" (Britney Spears featuring will.i.am)	2014	—	—	—	88	—	—	—	—	71	—		Britney Jean
"Home" (Leah McFall featuring will.i.am)	2014	—	—	—	—	—	—	—	—	—	56		Weird to Wonderful
"Ew!" (Jimmy Fallon featuring will.i.am)	2014	26	—	—	14	—	—	—	—	—	—		Non-album single
"I'm So Excited" (Anja Nissen featuring will.i.am and Cody Wise)	2014	—	—	42	—	—	—	—	—	—	—		Non-album single
"Born to Get Wild" (Steve Aoki featuring will.i.am)	2014	—	—	—	—	—	—	—	—	—	—		Neon Future I
"Embrace" (NXTGEN featuring will.i.am)	2019	—	—	—	—	—	—	—	—	—	—		Non-album single
"Love You More" (Steve Aoki featuring Lay and will.i.am)	2020	—	—	—	—	—	—	—	—	—	—		Neon Future IV
"—" denotes releases that did not chart or were not released in that territory.

=== Promotional singles ===
List of promotional singles, with selected chart positions, showing year released and album name
Title	Year	Peak chart positions				Album
Title	Year	US	CAN	NZ	UK	Album
"Here I Come" (Fergie featuring will.i.am)	2008	— (Note: "Here I Come" did not enter the Billboard Hot 100, but peaked at number 22 on the Bubbling Under Hot 100 Singles chart, which acts as an extension to the Hot 100.)	—	39	—	The Dutchess
"Yes We Can"	2008	—	—	—	—	Non-album single
"It's a New Day"	2008	78	84	—	—	Change is Now
"America's Song"	2009	—	—	—	—	Non-album single
"I Wanna Go Crazy" (David Guetta featuring will.i.am)	2009	—	83	—	92	One Love
"Go Home" (featuring Mick Jagger and Wolfgang Gartner)	2012	—	—	—	—	Non-album single
"Reach for the Stars (Mars Edition)"	2012	—	—	—	—	#willpower
"Fiyah"	2017	—	—	—	—	Non-album singles
"Pretty Little Thing" (featuring Lady Leshurr, Lioness and Ms Banks)	2019	—	—	—	—	Non-album singles
"—" denotes releases that did not chart or were not released in that territory.

== Other charted and certified songs ==
List of songs, with selected chart positions, showing year released and album name
Title	Year	Peak chart positions							Certifications	Album
Title	Year	US Dance	AUS	BEL (WA)	CAN	SVK	SWI	UK	Certifications	Album
"I Like to Move It"	2008	—	—	—	—	—	—	—	BPI: Silver; RMNZ: Platinum	Madagascar: Escape 2 Africa soundtrack
"On the Dancefloor" (David Guetta featuring will.i.am and apl.de.ap)	2009	—	62	24	87	—	—	—		One Love
"Boy Like You" (Cheryl Cole featuring will.i.am)	2010	—	—	—	—	—	—	105		3 Words
"Heaven" (Cheryl Cole featuring will.i.am)	2010	—	—	—	—	—	—	122		3 Words
"Best Night" (LMFAO featuring will.i.am, GoonRock and Eva Simons)	2012	—	—	—	—	68	—	—		Sorry for Party Rocking
"Let's Go" (featuring Chris Brown)	2013	38	—	—	—	—	—	—		#willpower
"—" denotes releases that did not chart or were not released in that territory.

== Other guest appearances ==
List of non-single guest appearances, with other performing artists, showing year released and album name
Title	Year	Other performer(s)	Album
"Merry Muthafuckin' Xmas"	1992	Eazy-E, Atban Klann	5150: Home 4 tha Sick
"Niggaz and Jewz (Some Say Kikes)"	1993	Blood of Abraham, Eazy-E	Future Profits
"Secrets"	2002	—N/a	Dexter's Laboratory: The Hip-Hop Experiment
"I Know"	2004	Destiny's Child	Unity: The Official Athens 2004 Olympic Games Album
"Dance to the Music"	2005	Sly and the Family Stone	Different Strokes by Different Folks
"CB (Sangue Bom)"	2005	Marcelo D2	Acústico MTV (MTV Unplugged)
"About You"	2005	Mary J. Blige, Nina Simone	The Breakthrough
"The Frog"	2006	Sérgio Mendes, Q-Tip	Timeless
"Let Me"	2006	Sérgio Mendes, Jill Scott	Timeless
"Bananeira (Banana Tree)"	2006	Sérgio Mendes, Mr. Vegas	Timeless
"Surfboard"	2006	Sérgio Mendes	Timeless
"Loose Ends"	2006	Sérgio Mendes, Justin Timberlake, Pharoahe Monch	Timeless
"Ei Menina (Hey Girl)"	2006	Sérgio Mendes	Timeless
"Yes, Yes Y'All"	2006	Sérgio Mendes, Black Thought, Chali 2na, Debi Nova	Timeless
"Weekend"	2006	Kelis	Kelis Was Here
"What's That Right There"	2006	Kelis	Kelis Was Here
"Damn Girl"	2006	Justin Timberlake	FutureSex/LoveSounds
"All That I Got (The Make Up Song)"	2006	Fergie	The Dutchess
"Compton"	2006	The Game	Doctor's Advocate
"Do It"	2006	Ciara	Ciara: The Evolution
"Treat Me Like Your Money"	2007	Macy Gray	Big
"Streets"	2007	Bone Thugs-n-Harmony, The Game	Strength & Loyalty
"Picture Perfect"	2007	Chris Brown	Exclusive
"P.Y.T. (Pretty Young Thing) 2008"	2008	Michael Jackson	Thriller 25
"Theme of 019"	2008	SMAP	Super.Modern.Artistic.Performance
"The Traveling Song"	2008	—N/a	Madagascar: Escape 2 Africa soundtrack
"Big and Chunky"	2008	—N/a	Madagascar: Escape 2 Africa soundtrack
"She Loves Me"	2008	—N/a	Madagascar: Escape 2 Africa soundtrack
"Best Friends"	2008	—N/a	Madagascar: Escape 2 Africa soundtrack
"Alex On The Spot"	2008	Hans Zimmer	Madagascar: Escape 2 Africa soundtrack
"Heaven"	2009	Cheryl Cole	3 Words
"Boy Like You"	2009	Cheryl Cole	3 Words
"Photographs"	2009	Rihanna	Rated R
"I Can't Wait"	2010	Mary J. Blige	Stronger with Each Tear
"Let's Get Down"	2010	Cheryl Cole	Messy Little Raindrops
"Big Fat Bass"	2011	Britney Spears	Femme Fatale
"Nothing Really Matters"	2011	David Guetta	Nothing but the Beat
"We Ain't"	2012	N.O.R.E.	Crack on Steroids
"Craziest Things"	2012	Cheryl Cole	A Million Lights
"Fall in Love"	2012	Rita Ora	Ora
"Alone"	2012	K'naan	Country, God or the Girl
"Grounded for Life"	2013	—N/a	Tarzan soundtrack
"All Hustle No Luck"	2015	French Montana, Lil Durk	Casino Life 2: Brown Bag Legend
"Don't Trip"	2015	The Game, Ice Cube, Dr. Dre	The Documentary 2
"LA"	2015	The Game, Snoop Dogg, Fergie	The Documentary 2
"The Ghetto"	2015	The Game, Nas	The Documentary 2
"The End"	2026	A$AP Rocky, Jessica Pratt	Don't Be Dumb

== Music videos ==
=== As lead artist ===
List of music videos as lead artist, showing year released and director
Title	Year	Director(s)
"I Am"	2001	Marcos Siega
"Secrets"	2002	Primal Screen
"I Got It from My Mama"	2007	Bryan Barber
"I Got It from My Mama" (Remix) (featuring The Paradiso Girls)	2007	—N/a
"Yes We Can"	2008	Jesse Dylan
"We Are the Ones"	2008	Jesse Dylan
"Heartbreaker" (featuring Cheryl Cole)	2008	Toben Seymour
"One More Chance"	2008	—N/a
"In My Name"	2008	Oxfam
"It's a New Day"	2008	Ben Mor
"She Loves Me"	2008	—N/a
"For Whom the Bell Tolls"	2009	Jason Goldwatch
"Check It Out" (with Nicki Minaj)	2010	Rich Lee
"T.H.E. (The Hardest Ever)" (featuring Jennifer Lopez and Mick Jagger)	2011	Rich Lee
"Great Times"	2012	Ben Mor
"This Is Love" (featuring Eva Simons)	2012	will.i.am
"Scream & Shout" (featuring Britney Spears)	2012	Ben Mor
"Scream & Shout" (Hit-Boy Remix) (featuring Britney Spears, Hit-Boy, Waka Flocka Flame, Lil Wayne and Diddy)	2013	Ben Mor
"#thatPOWER" (featuring Justin Bieber)	2013	Ben Mor
"Bang Bang"	2013	Igor Kovalik
"Feelin' Myself" (featuring Miley Cyrus, French Montana and Wiz Khalifa)	2013	Michael Jurkovac, Pasha Shapiro
"It's My Birthday" (featuring Cody Wise)	2014	Ben Mor
"Boys & Girls" (featuring Pia Mia)	2016	Unknown
"FIYAH" (featuring India Love)	2017	Shadae Lamar Smith

=== As featured artist ===
List of music videos as featured artist, showing year released and director
Title	Year	Director(s)
"Sunny Hours" (Long Beach Dub All Stars featuring will.i.am)	2001	Marcus Lawrence
"Vocal Artillery" (Ozomatli featuring Medusa, will.i.am, and Kanetic Source)	2001	Gabalazitaz Tiernaz
"La Patte" (Saïan Supa Crew featuring will.i.am)	2005	J.G. Biggs
"Beep" (Pussycat Dolls featuring will.i.am)	2006	Benny Boom
"That Heat" (Sérgio Mendes featuring Erykah Badu and will.i.am)	2006	Syndrome, Nabil Elderkin
"I Love My Bitch" (Busta Rhymes featuring Kelis and will.i.am)	2006	Benny Boom, Busta Rhymes
"Fergalicious" (Fergie featuring will.i.am)	2006	Fatima Robinson
"Hip Hop Is Dead" (Nas featuring will.i.am)	2006	Nas, Ulysses Terrero
"A Dream" (Common featuring will.i.am)	2006	Nabil Elderkin
"Baby Love" (Nicole Scherzinger featuring will.i.am)	2007	Francis Lawrence
"Hot Thing" (Talib Kweli featuring will.i.am)	2007	Bernard Gourley
"Wait a Minute (Just a Touch)" (Estelle featuring will.i.am)	2007	Neon
"Be OK" (Chrisette Michele featuring will.i.am)	2007	Lil X
"I Want You" (Common featuring will.i.am)	2007	Kerry Washington, Sanji
"In the Ayer" (Flo Rida featuring will.i.am)	2008	Shane Drake
"Funky Bahia" (Sérgio Mendes featuring will.i.am and Siedah Garrett)	2008	Neon
"All My Life (In the Ghetto)" (Jay Rock featuring Lil Wayne and will.i.am)	2008	Michael "The Greek" Mihail, Jonathan Silver
"3 Words" (version 1) (Cheryl Cole featuring will.i.am)	2009	Vincent Haycock
"3 Words" (version 2) (Cheryl Cole featuring will.i.am)	2009	Saam Farahmand
"I'm in the House" (Steve Aoki featuring will.i.am as Zuper Blahq)	2010	Jam Sutton
"OMG" (Usher featuring will.i.am)	2010	Anthony Mandler
"Wavin' Flag" (Celebration Mix) (K'naan featuring will.i.am and David Guetta)	2010	Nabil Elderkin
"Forever" (Wolfgang Gartner featuring will.i.am)	2011	Nabil Elderkin
"Free" (version 1) (Natalia Kills featuring will.i.am)	2011	—N/a
"Free" (version 2) (Natalia Kills featuring will.i.am)	2011	Guillaume "G" Doubet
"Problem" (The Monster Remix) (Becky G featuring will.i.am)	2012	P. R. Brown
"Burn the Disco" (Felix da Housecat featuring will.i.am)	2012	High5Collective
"Home" (Leah McFall featuring will.i.am)	2014	Elisha Smith-Leverocke
"Ew!" (Jimmy Fallon featuring will.i.am)	2014	—N/a
"I'm So Excited" (Anja Nissen featuring will.i.am and Cody Wise)	2014	Ernest Weber, Pasha Shapiro
"Born to Get Wild" (Steve Aoki featuring will.i.am)	2014	Dan Packer

=== Guest appearances ===
Title	Year	Artist	Director(s)	Ref.
"Imagine" (UNICEF: World version)	2014	Various	Michael Jurkovac	

== See also ==
- will.i.am production discography
- The Black Eyed Peas discography
