= Will.i.am production discography =

The following list is the discography of production and co-production by will.i.am. It includes a list of songs produced, co-produced and remixed by year, artist, album and song title. Alongside this, will.i.am was also a member of the production duo Jawbreakers.

== 1998 ==
=== Black Eyed Peas - Behind the Front ===
- "Fallin' Up"
- "Clap Your Hands"
- "Joints & Jam"
- "The Way U Make Me Feel" (featuring Kim Hill)
- "Movement"
- "Karma"
- "Be Free" (featuring Kim Hill)
- "Say Goodbye"
- "Duet" (featuring Redfoo)
- "Communication"
- "What It Is" (featuring Kim Hill)
- "¿Que Dices?"
- "A8"
- "Love Won't Wait" (featuring Macy Gray)
- "Head Bobs"
- "Positivity"

== 2000 ==
=== Black Eyed Peas - Bridging the Gap ===
- "Weekends" (feat. Esthero)
- "Get Original" (feat. Chali 2na)
- "Cali to New York" (feat. De La Soul)
- "Lil' Lil'"
- "On My Own" (feat. Les Nubians and Mos Def)
- "Go Go"
- "Bringing It Back"
- "Tell Your Mama Come"
- "Request + Line" (feat. Macy Gray)

=== Macy Gray - (CDS) ===
- "Why Didn't You Call Me (Black Eyed Peas Remix)"

== 2001 ==
=== will.i.am - Lost Change ===
- "Ev Rebahdee" (feat. Planet Asia)
- "Lay Me Down" (feat. Terry Dexter)
- "Possessions"
- "Tai Arrive"
- "If You Didn't Know" (feat. Mykill Miers)
- "Money" (feat. The Horn Dogs, Huck Fynn and Oezlem)
- "Lost Change"
- "I Am"
- "Hooda Hella U" (feat. Medusa)
- "Lost Change in E Minor"
- "Yadda Yadda"
- "Em A Double Dee" (feat. Mad Dogg)
- "Control Tower"
- "Lost Change in D Minor"

== 2003 ==
=== will.i.am - Must B 21 ===
- "Take It" (featuring KRS-One)
- "Nah Mean" (featuring Phife)
- "B Boyz" (featuring MC Supernatural)
- "Here to Party" (featuring Flii, Planet Asia and Kron Don)
- "Bomb Bomb" (Interlude)
- "Bomb Bomb" (featuring MC Supernatural)
- "Swing by My Way" (featuring John Legend)
- "It's OK" (featuring Triple Seven and Dante Santiago)
- "Mash Out" (Interlude)
- "Mash Out" (featuring MC Lyte and Fergie)
- "Ride Ride" (featuring John Legend)
- "Sumthin' Special" (featuring Niu, Dante Santiago and Taboo)
- "Sumthin' Special" (Interlude)
- "I'm Ready (Y'All Aint Ready for This)" (featuring Tash and MC Supernatural)
- "We Got Chu" (featuring Planet Asia & Flii)
- "Go!" (Interlude)
- "Go!"

=== The Black Eyed Peas - Elephunk ===
- "Hands Up"
- "Labor Day (It's a Holiday)"
- "Let's Get Retarded"
- "Hey Mama"
- "Shut Up"
- "Smells Like Funk"
- "Latin Girls" (feat. Debi Nova)
- "Sexy"
- "Fly Away"
- "The Boogie That Be"
- "The Apl Song"
- "Anxiety" (feat. Papa Roach)
- "Where Is the Love?"

=== Sting & Mary J. Blige - (CDS) ===
- "Whenever I Say Your Name (Will.I.Am Remix)"

=== Burning Star - Burning Star ===
- "On My Own"

== 2004 ==
=== Sting - (CDS) ===
- "Stolen Car (Take Me Dancing) (Remix)"

=== John Legend - Get Lifted ===
- "She Don't Have to Know"
- "Ordinary People"

=== Juanes - Mi Sangre ===
- "La paga" (feat. Taboo)

== 2005 ==
=== Carlos Santana - All That I Am ===
- "I Am Somebody" (feat. will.i.am)

=== The Black Eyed Peas - Monkey Business ===
- "Pump It"
- "Don't Phunk with My Heart"
- "Don't Lie"
- "My Humps"
- "Like That" (feat. Q-Tip, Talib Kweli, Cee-Lo and John Legend)
- "Dum Diddly" (feat. Dante Santiago)
- "Gone Going" (feat. Jack Johnson)
- "They Don't Want Music" (feat. James Brown)
- "Bebot"
- "Audio Delite at Low Fidelity"
- "Union" (feat. Sting)

=== Pussycat Dolls - PCD ===
- "Beep" (feat. will.i.am)

=== Hitch Original Soundtrack ===
- "Don't You Worry Bout a Thing" (John Legend feat. will.i.am)

=== Stealth Original Soundtrack ===
- "Dance to the Music" (Sly and the Family Stone feat. will.i.am)

=== Mary J. Blige - The Breakthrough ===
- "About You" (feat. Nina Simone and will.i.am)

=== Shaggy - Clothes Drop ===
- "Shut Up & Dance" (feat. Fergie and will.i.am)

=== Ricky Martin - Life ===
- "It's Alright"
- "Drop It on Me" (feat. Daddy Yankee and Taboo)

=== Sarah McLachlan - Bloom: Remix Album ===
- "Just Like Me (will.i.am Mix)" (feat. DMC)

=== Earth, Wind & Fire - Illumination ===
- "Lovely People" (feat. will.i.am)

== 2006 ==
=== Sérgio Mendes - Timeless ===
- "Mas Que Nada" (feat. The Black Eyed Peas)
- "That Heat" (feat. Erykah Badu and will.i.am)
- "The Frog" (feat. Q-Tip and will.i.am)
- "Let Me" (feat. Jill Scott and will.i.am)
- "Surfboard" (feat. will.i.am)
- "Loose Ends" (feat. Justin Timberlake, Pharoahe Monch and will.i.am)
- "Yes, Yes Y'All" (feat. Black Thought, Chali 2na, Debi Nova and will.i.am)

=== Busta Rhymes - The Big Bang ===
- "I Love My Bitch" (feat. Kelis and will.i.am)

=== Justin Timberlake - FutureSex/LoveSounds ===
- "Damn Girl" (feat. will.i.am)
- "Pose" (feat. Snoop Dogg)
- "Boutique in Heaven"

=== Too Short - Blow The Whistle ===
- "Keep Bouncin'" (feat. Snoop Dogg and will.i.am)

=== Fergie - The Dutchess ===
- "Fergalicious" (feat. will.i.am)
- "Clumsy"
- "All That I Got (The Make Up Song)" (feat. will.i.am)
- "Voodoo Doll"
- "Here I Come" (feat. will.i.am)
- "Velvet"
- "Big Girls Don't Cry"
- "Mary Jane Shoes"

=== Kelis - Kelis Was Here ===
- "What's That Right There?" (feat. will.i.am)
- "Till the Wheels Fall Off"
- "Weekend" (feat. will.i.am)
- "Fuck Them Bitches"

=== Diddy - Press Play ===
- "Special Feeling"
- "All Night Long" (feat. Fergie)

=== John Legend - Once Again ===
- "Save Room"
- "Each Day Gets Better"
- "Slow Dance"
- "Coming Home"

=== The Game - Doctor's Advocate ===
- "Compton" (feat. will.i.am)
- ""I'm Chillin'" (feat. Fergie and will.i.am)

=== Ciara - Ciara: The Evolution ===
- "Do It" (feat. will.i.am)
- "Get In, Fit In"

=== Nas - Hip Hop Is Dead ===
- "Hip Hop Is Dead" (feat. will.i.am)
- "Who Killed It?"
- "Can't Forget About You"

== 2007 ==
=== Freedom Writers Original Soundtrack ===
- "A Dream" (Common feat. will.i.am)
- "Colors" (will.i.am)
- "Bus Ride" (will.i.am)
- "Riots" (Mark Isham feat. Miri Ben-Ari and will.i.am)

=== Bone Thugs-n-Harmony - Strength & Loyalty ===
- "Streets" (feat. The Game and will.i.am)

=== Macy Gray - Big ===
- "Finally Made Me Happy"
- "Okay"
- "Glad You're Here" (feat. Fergie)
- "Ghetto Love"
- "One for Me"
- "Strange Behaviour"
- "Get Out"
- "Treat Me Like Your Money" (feat. will.i.am)
- "Everybody"

=== Chrisette Michele - I Am ===
- "Be Ok"
- "Let's Rock"

=== Daddy Yankee - El Cartel: The Big Boss ===
- "Who's Your Daddy?"
- "Plane to PR" (feat. will.i.am)

=== Common - Finding Forever ===
- "I Want You" (feat. will.i.am)

=== Talib Kweli - Eardrum ===
- "Hot Thing" (feat. will.i.am)
- "Say Something"

=== Wyclef Jean - The Carnival II: Memoirs of an Immigrant ===
- "Touch Your Button Carnival Jam: Let Me Touch Your Button"

=== Brick & Lace - Love Is Wicked ===
- "Buss a Shot"

=== Chris Brown - Exclusive ===
- "Picture Perfect" (feat. will.i.am)

=== LA Symphony - Unleashed ===
- "Idle Times"

=== will.i.am - Songs About Girls ===
- "Over"
- "Heartbreaker"
- "I Got It from My Mama"
- "Get Your Money"
- "The Donque Song" (feat. Snoop Dogg)
- "Impatient" (feat. Dante Santiago)
- "Invisible"
- "Fantastic"
- "Fly Girl"
- "Dynamite Interlude"
- "Make It Funky"
- "S.O.S (Mother Nature)"

=== Nicole Scherzinger - (CDS) ===
- "Baby Love"

== 2008 ==
=== Michael Jackson - Thriller 25 ===
- "The Girl Is Mine 2008" (feat. will.i.am)
- "P.Y.T. (Pretty Young Thing) 2008" (feat. will.i.am)
- "Beat It 2008" (feat. Fergie)

=== Flo Rida - Mail on Sunday ===
- "In the Ayer" (feat. will.i.am)

=== Estelle - Shine ===
- "Wait a Minute (Just a Touch)" (feat. will.i.am)
- "American Boy" (feat. Kanye West)

=== Murs - Murs for President ===
- "Lookin' Fly" {co-producer}

=== Mariah Carey - E=MC² ===
- "Heat"

=== Usher - Here I Stand ===
- "What's Your Name?" (feat. will.i.am)

=== SMAP - Super Modern Artistic Performance ===
- "Theme of 019" (feat. will.i.am)
- "Here Is Your Hit"

=== John Legend - Evolver ===
- "Cross the Line"
- "Satisfaction"
- "I Love, You Love"

=== Sérgio Mendes - Encanto ===
- "The Look of Love" (feat. Fergie)
- "Funky Bahia" (feat. will.i.am and Siedah Garrett)
- "Água De Beber" (feat. will.i.am)

== 2009 ==
=== Nat King Cole - Re:Generations ===
- "Straighten Up and Fly Right"

=== U2 - No Line on the Horizon ===
- "I'll Go Crazy If I Don't Go Crazy Tonight"

=== Flo Rida - R.O.O.T.S. ===
- "Available" (feat. Akon and will.i.am)

=== The Black Eyed Peas - The E.N.D. ===
- "Boom Boom Pow"
- "Rock That Body"
- "Meet Me Halfway"
- "Imma Be"
- "I Gotta Feeling"
- "Alive"
- "Missing You"
- "Party All the Time"
- "Out of My Head"
- "Electric City"
- "Now Generation"
- "One Tribe"
- "Rockin to the Beat"

=== Cheryl Cole - 3 Words ===
- "3 Words (song)" (feat. will.i.am)
- "Heaven" (feat. will.i.am)
- "Make Me Cry"
- "Boy Like You" (feat. will.i.am)
- "Heartbreaker"

=== Rihanna - Rated R ===
- "Photographs" (feat. will.i.am)

=== Mary J. Blige - Stronger with Each Tear ===
- "I Can't Wait" (feat. will.i.am)

== 2010 ==
=== Kelis - Flesh Tone ===
- "Brave"

=== Usher - Raymond v. Raymond ===
- "OMG" (feat. will.i.am)

=== Nicki Minaj - Pink Friday ===
- "Check It Out" (feat. will.i.am)

=== Cheryl Cole - Messy Little Raindrops ===
- "Live Tonight"
- "Let's Get Down" (feat. will.i.am)

=== The Black Eyed Peas - The Beginning ===
- "The Time (Dirty Bit)"
- "Light Up the Night"
- "Love You Long Time"
- "XOXOXO"
- "Someday"
- "Whenever"
- "Fashion Beats"
- "Don't Stop the Party"
- "The Best One Yet (The Boy)" (feat. David Guetta)
- "Just Can't Get Enough"
- "The Coming"
- "Own It"
- "Phenomenon"
- "Take It Off"

== 2011 ==
=== Britney Spears - Femme Fatale ===
- "Big Fat Bass" (feat. will.i.am)

== 2012 ==
=== Usher - Looking 4 Myself ===
- "Can't Stop Won't Stop"

=== Cheryl Cole - A Million Lights ===
- "Craziest Things" (feat. will.i.am)

=== Rita Ora - Ora ===
- "Fall in Love" (feat. will.i.am)

=== K'naan - Country, God, or the Girl ===
- "Alone" (feat. will.i.am)

=== Priyanka Chopra - In My City ===
- "In My City" (feat. will.i.am)

=== Kesha - Warrior ===
- "Crazy Kids"

== 2013 ==
=== will.i.am - #willpower ===
- "Good Morning"
- "Hello"
- "This Is Love" (feat. Eva Simons)
- "Scream & Shout" (feat. Britney Spears)
- "Gettin' Dumb" (feat. apl.de.ap and 2NE1)
- "Geekin'"
- "Freshy" (feat. Juicy J)
- "#thatPower" (feat. Justin Bieber)
- "Great Times Are Coming"
- "The World Is Crazy" (feat. Dante Santiago)
- "Love Bullets" (feat. Skylar Grey)
- "Far Away from Home" (feat. Nicole Scherzinger)
- "Reach for the Stars"
- "Smile Mona Lisa"
- "Bang Bang"

=== The Great Gatsby: Music from Baz Luhrmann's Film ===
- "Bang Bang" (will.i.am)

=== Dizzee Rascal - The Fifth ===
- "Something Really Bad" (feat. will.i.am)

=== Miley Cyrus - Bangerz ===
- "Do My Thang"

=== Britney Spears - Britney Jean ===
- "Work Bitch"
- "Perfume"
- "It Should Be Easy" (featuring will.i.am)
- "Body Ache"
- "Til It's Gone"
- "Chillin' with You" (featuring Jamie Lynn)
- "Don't Cry"
- "Now That I Found You"

=== Robin Thicke - Blurred Lines ===
- "Feel Good"
- "Go Stupid 4 U"

=== Lady Gaga - ARTPOP ===
- "Fashion!"

== 2014 ==
=== will.i.am - Birthday ===
- "Birthday" (feat. Cody Wise)

=== Anja Nissen - I'm So Excited ===
- "I'm So Excited" (feat. will.i.am and Cody Wise)

=== Nicki Minaj - The Pinkprint ===
- "Grand Piano"

== 2015 ==
=== The Game - The Documentary 2 ===
- "Don't Trip" (featuring Dr. Dre, Ice Cube, & will.i.am)
- "LA" (featuring Snoop Dogg, Fergie, & will.i.am)
- "The Ghetto" (featuring Nas & will.i.am)

=== PSY - 칠집싸이다 ===
- "Daddy" (featuring CL of 2NE1)
- "ROCKnROLLbaby" (featuring will.i.am)

== 2016 ==
=== will.i.am - N/A ===
- 00. "Boys & Girls" (featuring Pia Mia)

== 2017 ==
Fergie - Double Dutchess

- "Like It Ain't Nuttin'" {co-producer}
- "You Already Know"

== 2018 ==
=== Black Eyed Peas - Masters of the Sun Vol. 1 ===
- "Back 2 Hiphop" (Nas)
- "Yes or No"
- "Get Ready"
- "4ever" (Esthero)
- "Constant pt.1 pt.2" (Slick Rick)
- "Dopeness" (CL)
- "All Around the World"
- "New Wave"
- "Vibrations pt.1 pt.2"
- "Wings"
- "Ring the Alarm pt.1 pt.2 pt.3"
- "Big Love"

=== LGP Qua - Voice of the Youth Vol. 1 ===
- "INSOMNIAC (woke)" (featuring will.i.am)

== 2024 ==
=== ¥$ (Kanye West and Ty Dolla Sign) – Vultures 1 ===
- 14. "Good (Don't Die)" (Produced with Ye, Ty Dolla Sign and Johnny Goldstein)

== 2025 ==
=== Xzibit – Kingmaker ===
- 16. "Success"

== 2026 ==
=== ASAP Rocky – Don't Be Dumb ===
- 15. "The End (featuring will.i.am & Jessica Pratt)" (Produced with ASAP Rocky, Emile Haynie and Zach Fogarty)

== Produced singles from will.i.am ==
Year	Song	Artist
1998	"Fallin' Up/¿Que Dices?"	The Black Eyed Peas
1998	"Joints & Jam"	The Black Eyed Peas
1998	"Karma"	The Black Eyed Peas
2000	"BEP Empire/Get Original"	The Black Eyed Peas
2000	"Weekends"	The Black Eyed Peas
2001	"Request + Line"	The Black Eyed Peas (featuring Macy Gray)
2003	"Where Is the Love?"	The Black Eyed Peas
2003	"Shut Up"	The Black Eyed Peas
2004	"Hey Mama"	The Black Eyed Peas
2004	"Let's Get It Started"	The Black Eyed Peas
2004	"Ordinary People"	John Legend
2005	"Don't Phunk with My Heart"	The Black Eyed Peas
2005	"Don't Lie"	The Black Eyed Peas
2005	"My Humps"	The Black Eyed Peas
2005	"Pump It"	The Black Eyed Peas
2006	"Beep"	Pussycat Dolls (featuring will.i.am)
2006	"Play with Fire"	Hilary Duff
2006	"I Love My Chick"	Busta Rhymes (featuring Kelis & will.i.am)
2006	"Fergalicious"	Fergie (featuring will.i.am)
2006	"Mas Que Nada"	Sérgio Mendes featuring The Black Eyed Peas
2006	"Hip Hop Is Dead"	Nas (featuring will.i.am)
2006	"Save Room"	John Legend
2007	"Can't Forget About You"	Nas (featuring Chrisette Michelle)
2007	"A Dream"	Common (featuring will.i.am)
2007	"Big Girls Don't Cry"	Fergie
2007	"I Got It from My Mama"	will.i.am
2007	"Baby Love"	Nicole Scherzinger (featuring will.i.am)
2007	"Hot Thing"	Talib Kweli (featuring will.i.am)
2007	"Wait a Minute (Just a Touch)"	Estelle (featuring will.i.am)
2007	"I Want You"	Common (featuring will.i.am)
2008	"American Boy"	Estelle (featuring Kanye West)
2008	"In the Ayer"	Flo Rida (featuring will.i.am)
2008	"What's Your Name"	Usher (featuring will.i.am)
2009	"I Need a Dance"	Samman with David Guetta & will.i.am (featuring Paris)
2009	"Boom Boom Pow"	The Black Eyed Peas
2009	"Meet Me Halfway"	The Black Eyed Peas
2009	"3 Words"	Cheryl Cole (featuring will.i.am)
2010	"Imma Be"	The Black Eyed Peas
2010	"Rock That Body"	The Black Eyed Peas
2010	"OMG"	Usher (featuring will.i.am)
2010	"Check It Out"	Nicki Minaj (featuring will.i.am)
2010	"The Time (The Dirty Bit)"	The Black Eyed Peas
2011	"Just Can't Get Enough"	The Black Eyed Peas
2011	"Don't Stop the Party"	The Black Eyed Peas
2011	"Forever"	will.i.am (featuring Wolfgang Gartner)
2012	"T.H.E. (The Hardest Ever)"	will.i.am (featuring Jennifer Lopez & Mick Jagger)
2012	"This Is Love"	will.i.am (featuring Eva Simons)
2012	"Scream & Shout"	will.i.am (featuring Britney Spears)
2013	"Take The World On"	2NE1
2013	"#thatPOWER"	will.i.am (featuring Justin Bieber)
2013	"Bang Bang"	will.i.am
2023	"I'm Every Woman"	Jen & Liv
