= PHNX =

PHNX or phnx may refer to:

- Phnx (script), the Phoenician alphabet
- ISO 15924:Phnx, the Paleo-Hebrew alphabet and Phoenician script
- PHNX, the trading mark of the company Phoenix Group on the London Stock Exchange
- PHNX aka Féfé (born 1976), French rapper of Niger origin
