= X Raisons =

X-Raisons

Studio album by Saïan Supa Crew
- Released: December 10, 2001
- Genre: Hip hop
- Length: 65:14
- Label: Virgin France

Saïan Supa Crew chronology
KLR (1999)	X-Raisons (2001)	Hold-Up (2005)

Professional ratings
Review scores
Source	Rating
Drowned In Sound	4/5 stars
BBC Collective	7/10 stars

X Raisons (pronounced [iks ʁezɔ̃]) is the second album from the French hip hop band Saïan Supa Crew, released in 2001. The album's international version was promoted by Roots Manuva and Brand Nubian.

== Track listing ==
No.	Title	Length
1.	"Intro"	0:34
2.	"Ils Etaient une Fois"	4:53
3.	"19, 20 Ans"	4:25
4.	"Polices"	5:14
5.	"Maladie"	3:54
6.	"Interluce"	0:05
7.	"14.02.2002"	4:32
8.	"Voodoo Child (Slight Return)"	1:06
9.	"J'Entends Dire"	4:01
10.	"Dernière Séance"	3:04
11.	"Au Nom de Quoi"	3:36
12.	"Soldat 1"	3:28
13.	"Soldat 2"	4:44
14.	"A Demi-Nue"	4:40
15.	"Mohammed et Sebastien"	1:09
16.	"J'Avais"	4:36
17.	"Tourner la Page"	3:15
18.	"...Mitaw Tao"	1:15
19.	"A Co' Mow (Hamisow Boh)"	3:35
20.	"Le Chanteur Fou"	0:46
21.	"Xraísons"	4:21
22.	"Dernière Séance"	5:45
