= Elevator (Flo Rida song) =

2008 single by Flo Rida featuring Timbaland

Single by Flo Rida featuring Timbaland

from the album Mail on Sunday
- Released: February 12, 2008
- Recorded: 2007
- Genre: Hip-hop
- Length: 3:50 (album version); 3:36 (radio edit)
- Label: Atlantic
- Songwriters: Tramar Dillard; Timothy Mosley; Hannon Lane
- Producers: Hannon Lane; Timbaland

Flo Rida singles chronology
"Low" (2007)	"Elevator" (2008)	"Move Shake Drop" (2008)

Timbaland singles chronology
"Release" (2008)	"Elevator" (2008)	"In the Ayer" (2008)

Music video
- "Elevator" on YouTube

"Elevator" is Flo Rida's overall second single (after "Low", which was from the soundtrack of the 2008 movie Step Up 2: The Streets), and the first single from Flo Rida's debut album Mail on Sunday. It was produced by Timbaland, who also features on the track. The piano intro features a melody based on the Halloween theme by John Carpenter and the second verse imitates the chorus of "The Donque Song" by will.i.am featuring Snoop Dogg. The song features Timbaland's signature percussion and vocals, as well as former Beatclub recording artist Kiley Dean on the background vocals. The song is similar in structure, key, and rhythm to the Timbaland-produced "4 Minutes" by Madonna featuring Justin Timberlake and Timbaland. The song was featured in the plot for the episode "Desperately Seeking Serena" of teen drama Gossip Girl.

== Music video ==
The music video was directed by Gil Green and it premiered on February 17, 2008, featuring cameo appearances by DJ Khaled, Rick Ross, Brisco, Gunplay of Triple C's, Dre, Lil Boosie, Christina Milian and DJ Kronik..

== Release history ==
Region	Date
United States	February 12, 2008
Chile	April 25, 2008
United Kingdom	June 23, 2008

== Track listing ==
Maxi Single

1. "Elevator [feat. Timbaland]" (Album Version) - 3:51
2. "Low [feat. T-Pain]" (Travis Barker Remix) - 4:15
3. "Gotta Eat" (Non-Album Track) - 3:53
4. "Jealous" (Ray Seay Mix) (Explicit) - 4:06
5. "Elevator [feat. Timbaland]" Video

== Chart performance ==
In the U.S., "Elevator" debuted on the Billboard Hot 100 at #100 and then later peaked at #16. In New Zealand, the single peaked at #10 in its seventh chart week, making Flo Rida's second single in the RIANZ top 10. The track debuted on the Hot Digital Songs chart at #10 with 64,000 downloads. It has had moderate success on the Irish Singles Chart, peaking at 11.

In Canada, the song debuted as a "Hot Shot Debut" at number 12 on the Canadian Hot 100 on the issue of March 1, and then rose to number 10 the next week based on digital sales. In the UK, the song peaked at number 20.

In Australia, it peaked at 13 and has been certified Gold.

=== Weekly charts ===
Chart (2008)	Peak position
Australia (ARIA)	13
Austria (Ö3 Austria Top 40)	69
Belgium (Ultratop 50 Flanders)	47
Canada Hot 100 (Billboard)	10
Czech Republic Airplay (ČNS IFPI)	31
European Hot 100 Singles (Billboard)	46
Germany (GfK)	34
Hungary (Rádiós Top 40)	21
Ireland (IRMA)	11
New Zealand (Recorded Music NZ)	10
Sweden (Sverigetopplistan)	19
Switzerland (Schweizer Hitparade)	92
UK Singles (OCC)	20
US Billboard Hot 100	16
US Hot R&B/Hip-Hop Songs (Billboard)	52
US Hot Rap Songs (Billboard)	10
US Pop Airplay (Billboard)	34
US Rhythmic Airplay (Billboard)	10

=== Year-end charts ===
Chart (2008)	Position
Australia (ARIA)	62
Canada (Canadian Hot 100)	72
UK Singles (Official Charts Company)	149
Chart (2009)	Position
Hungary (Rádiós Top 40)	84

=== Certifications ===
Region	Certification	Certified units/sales
Australia (ARIA)	Gold	35,000^{^}
Canada (Music Canada)	Gold	40,000^{*}
United States (RIAA)	Platinum	1,000,000^{‡}
^{*} Sales figures based on certification alone.^{^} Shipments figures based on certification alone.^{‡} Sales+streaming figures based on certification alone.

== Release history ==
Release dates and formats for "Elevator"
Region	Date	Format	Label(s)	Ref.
United States	April 8, 2008	Mainstream airplay	Atlantic	
