= Kat Graham =

American actress and singer (born 1989)

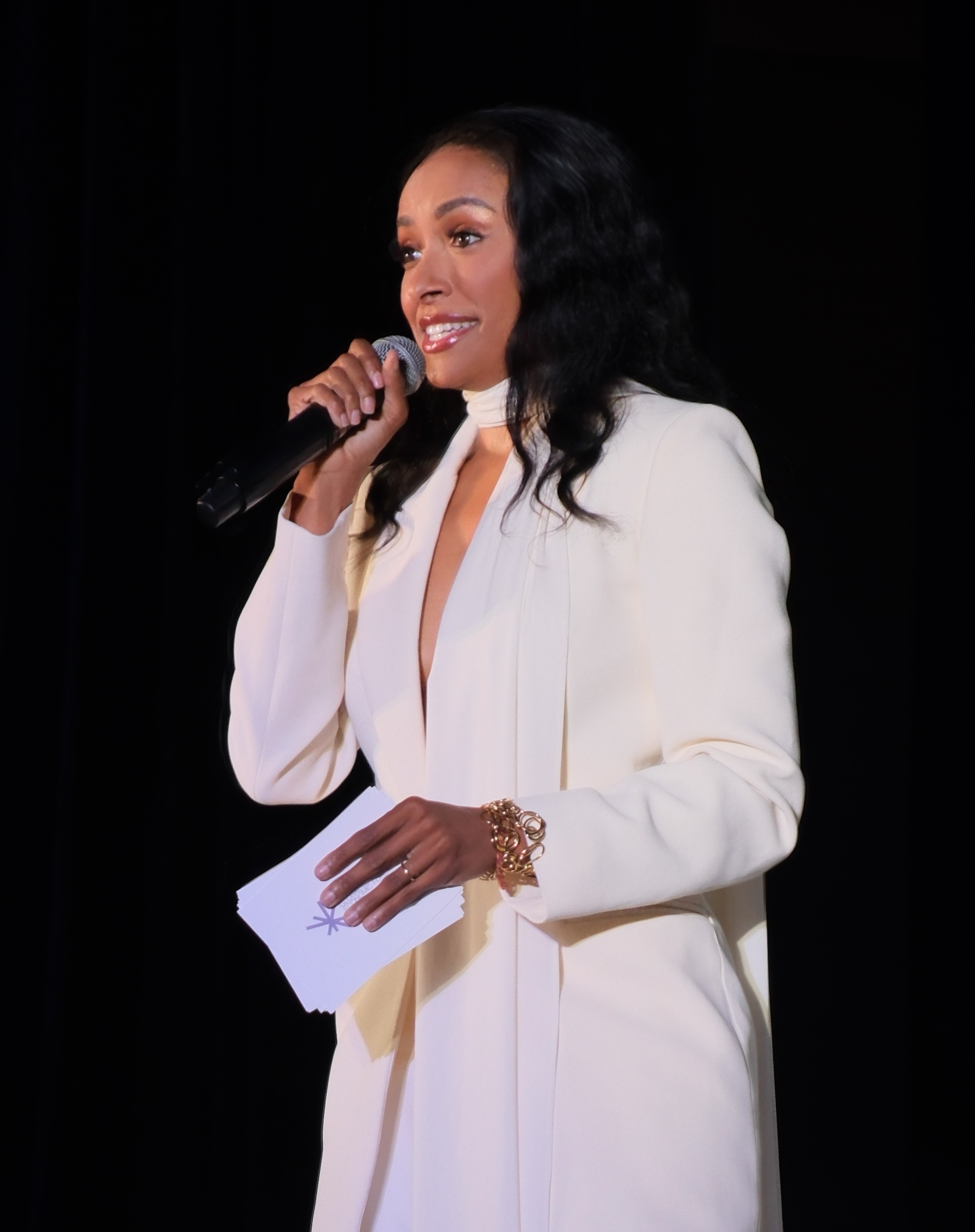
- Kat Graham at Essence Festival of Culture 2025
- Born: Katerina Alexandre Hartford Graham; September 5, 1989 (age 37); Geneva, Switzerland
- Occupations: Actress; singer; dancer; model
- Years active: 1995–present
- Known for: Playing Bonnie Bennett on The Vampire Diaries
- Spouse: Bryant Wood (m. 2023)
- Children: 1
- Musical career
- Also known as: Toro Gato
- Genres: R&B; pop; hip hop; soul; dance
- Instrument: Vocals
- Years active: 1998–present
- Labels: A&M/Octone (2012–2013); Interscope (2014–2015); Sound Zoo (2015–present)
- Website: www.KatGraham.com

Katerina Alexandre Hartford Graham (born September 5, 1989) is a Swiss-born American actress, singer, and dancer. She played Bonnie Bennett on the CW supernatural drama series The Vampire Diaries (2009–2017). Her film credits include The Parent Trap (1998), 17 Again (2009), The Roommate (2011), Honey 2 (2011), Addicted (2014), and All Eyez on Me (2017). Graham has released two EPs and four studio albums.

== Early life ==
Katerina Alexandre Hartford Graham was born on September 5, 1989, in Geneva, Switzerland, and raised in Los Angeles, California, United States. Her father, Joseph, is of Americo-Liberian descent, and her mother, Natasha, was Jewish (from a family from Poland and Russia). Graham's father was a music executive and the godfather of two of producer Quincy Jones' children. Her paternal grandfather was a UN Ambassador, serving for 40 years in the Netherlands, Sweden, Romania, and Kenya. Graham disclosed in an interview that her father left the music industry to work as a journalist under his father for the UN. Her maternal and paternal grandparents were refugees from the Holocaust and Liberia, respectively, and she credits them as an inspiration for her work as a Goodwill Ambassador for UNHCR.

Her parents divorced when she was 5 years old. During a 2025 episode of the podcast Baby, This is Keke Palmer, Graham revealed she and her father were estranged. She has one half-brother, Yakov, born in Tel Aviv, Israel. Graham was raised in her mother's Jewish religion and attended a Hebrew school.

== Career ==
=== Commercials and dancing ===
Graham began her career in the entertainment industry at age 6. Within the following eight years, she appeared in numerous television commercials, including advertisements for Barbie, Edison, K-Mart, and Pop-Tarts. At age 15, Graham caught the eye of choreographer Fatima Robinson, and was asked to perform at the BET Awards as a background dancer for hip-hop rapper Bow Wow. Graham followed her BET Awards appearance with work as a background dancer for Missy Elliott, Pharrell Williams, Jamie Foxx, and choreographers Hi-Hat and Michael Rooney. At age 17, Graham participated in a national marketing campaign to advertise Coca-Cola's soda brand Fanta. Graham appeared in the marketing campaign as a member of the "Fantanas", known as Capri, also known as Strawberry. Graham has appeared in several music videos, including Ying Yang Twins' "Salt Shaker", Akon's "Lonely", Christina Milian's "Dip It Low", Justin Bieber and Usher's "Somebody to Love (Remix)", 112's "What If", John Legend's "Used to Love U", B2K's "Why I Love You", Musiq Soulchild's "B.U.D.D.Y.", Nelly's "Just A Dream" and Diddy – Dirty Money with Usher's "Looking for Love".

=== Television and film ===
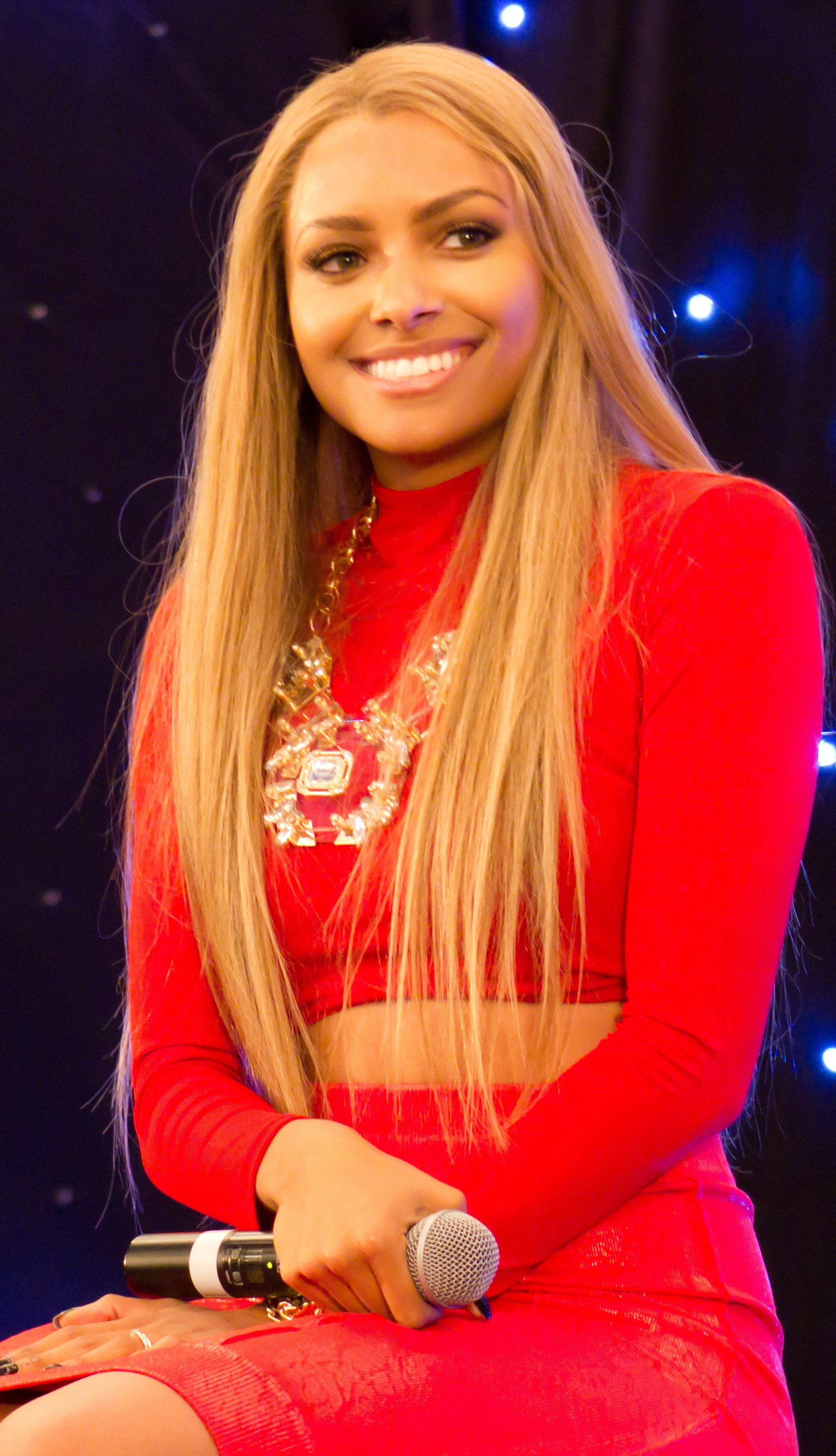
Graham in June 2013

In 1998, Graham made her film debut in the remake of The Parent Trap alongside Lindsay Lohan. Graham plays the role of Jackie, a Camp Walden camper. In 2002, Graham made her television debut on the Disney Channel teen comedy series Lizzie McGuire. Graham went on to appear on various television series, including CSI: Crime Scene Investigation, The O.C., Malcolm in the Middle, Joan of Arcadia, Grounded For Life, and Greek. In 2008, she appeared in the musical comedy series Hannah Montana playing the role of a girlfriend to Jason Earles's character Jackson Stewart as a guest appearance for three episodes. Graham has also had well-known supporting roles in films such as 17 Again and The Roommate.

In December 2008, Graham began filming sci-fi/dance film Boogie Town in Los Angeles. However, shooting the film was put on hold that same month due to payroll issues with background performers. In April 2009, principal photography was stopped due to schedule conflicts with some of her co-stars and other projects. The film is a retelling of the tragedy Romeo and Juliet and is set in a futuristic New York City where dance battles are permanently banned. Graham plays the role of Ingrid. The film was set to be released in theaters worldwide October 2011; however, it was set to be originally released in June 2009.

In March 2009, Graham was cast in The CW supernatural drama series The Vampire Diaries based on the book series of the same name. Graham plays the role of Bonnie Bennett, a young witch, which is considered her breakout role. The series premiered on September 10, 2009, to 4.91 million viewers and received mixed reviews for its progression from critics. In May 2012, the series was renewed for the show's fourth season. She took over as the female lead in 2015 after the Canadian actress Nina Dobrev departed for the seventh season. In 2011, Graham won "Choice TV Female Scene Stealer" at the Teen Choice Awards for her role on the show.

In August 2010, The Hollywood Reporter announced that Graham was cast in the Universal Pictures dance drama film Honey 2. The film is a sequel to the 2003 film Honey. The film follows a troubled girl and aspiring dancer who joins a dance crew. The film was released theatrically in selected countries for a limited release and went on to make over US$8 million worldwide. In June 2011, the film was released direct-to-DVD in North America to negative reviews from critics though Graham's performance and dancing was praised. Later that year, Graham starred in the dance-oriented comedy film, Dance Fu, in which she appeared as the female lead.

In 2017, she played actress Jada Pinkett Smith in the Tupac biopic All Eyez on Me.

Graham starred in the Netflix romantic comedy films The Holiday Calendar (2018), Operation Christmas Drop (2020), and Love in the Villa (2022). She has also appeared in the 2018 apocalyptic thriller How It Ends. Graham is set to play singer and actress Diana Ross in the Michael Jackson biopic Michael.

In 2022, Graham competed in season eight of The Masked Singer as "Robo-Girl". After besting Mario Cantone as "Maize" and Gloria Gaynor as "Mermaid" on "Andrew Lloyd Webber Night", she was eliminated on "Muppet Night" alongside Jerry Springer as "Beetle".

=== Music ===
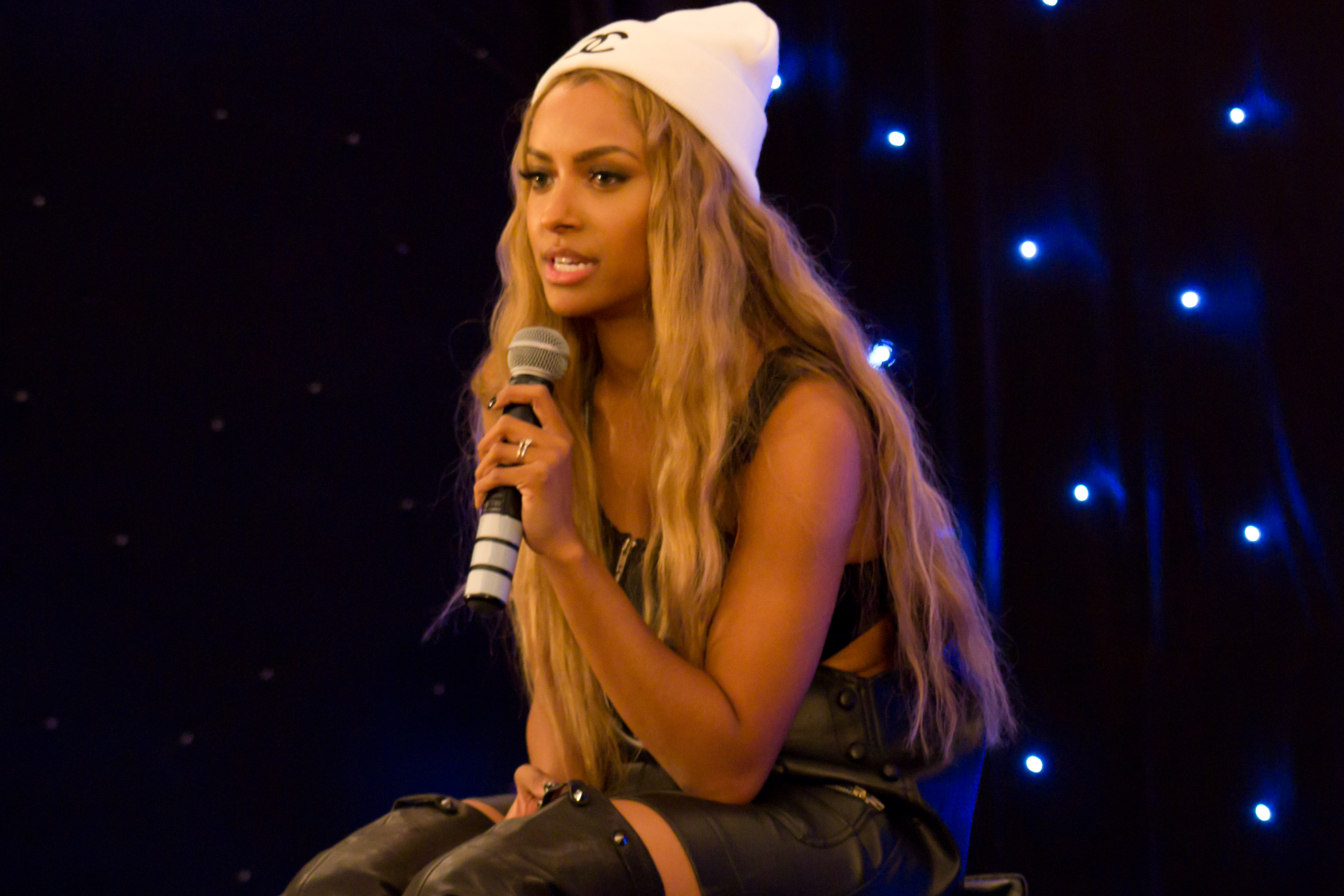
Kat Graham

In 2002, she wrote a song titled "Derailed", which was featured in the Jean-Claude Van Damme film of the same title. In 2006, Graham pursued a career as a musical artist. Graham found her break in 2007 when she was featured on "The Donque Song" and "I Got It From My Mama" on singer/rapper will.i.am's third studio album Songs About Girls. The move saw Graham embark on a world tour with The Black Eyed Peas as a supporting act for the Black Blue & You Tour. In April 2010, the song "My Boyfriends Back" released on YouTube and got over 1 million views. In October 2010, Graham released her debut single "Sassy". A music video for the song premiered that same month, but the track performed poorly and it failed to chart. She then went on to release covers of artists such as Janet Jackson and Paula Abdul which garnered Graham the attention of Paula who praised her cover. Graham contributed a cover of the Garbage song "Only Happy When It Rains" to The Vampire Diaries soundtrack. The song premiered in December 2010 in an episode of the series titled "The Sacrifice". In March 2011, Graham released another single titled "I Want It All". The music video released in May 2011.

In February 2012, Graham signed a recording contract with A&M/Octone Records, her first major label signing. In March 2012, Graham released "Put Your Graffiti On Me". The song itself received positive reviews from critics. In the same month, the music video premiered and as of October 19, 2012, had reached 4,843,458 views on YouTube. The song peaked at #5 on the US Billboard Hot Dance Club Songs chart. On May 29, Graham performed the track on The Ellen DeGeneres Show. This was marked as her first televised musical performance ever. On that same day Graham released her first EP Against The Wall which debuted at #54 on the iTunes Music Album Chart. The music video for her second single "Wanna Say" was directed by Benny Boom and produced by London Alley. She also appeared on the song "Dog Day Afternoon" from the Ras Kass & Doc Hollywood free collaborative digital album Spit No Evil. On June 25, 2013, Graham gave the opportunity to five fans to release the name of her new single on Twitter, and released the single premiere of "Power" at Billboard.com the next day. As stated on Billboard.com, Graham also released a new single titled "1991" on March 10, 2015.

On September 25, 2015, Graham released her first studio album, Roxbury Drive. Her second studio album, Love Music Funk Magic, was released on June 2, 2017. Throughout 2018, Graham released The Dance Collective, a series of short dance videos for old songs, including some unrealized songs, on her YouTube channel.

Graham released her debut as Toro Gato, a new identity embracing her West African culture and ancestry, the EP Toro Gato on September 10, 2021, as a part of her NFT collection. A music video of her first single, "Swim," from the album was uploaded onto a separate YouTube channel under the same name as her EP a month prior. She released Toro Gato Pt. II on January 28, 2022; only a day following the upload of the music video for "White Flag," her second single from the project. The full album Toro Gato: Part II (Deluxe Edition) was released the same day in 3 versions, and includes unreleased songs and short films, as well as vinyls, cassettes, and exclusive merchandise. Both albums are exclusively available on the YellowHeart NFT platform for a limited time as a part of the Toro Gato collection. This project is the first time ever that audio and video content is exclusive to view and experience only on an owned NFT.

On June 3, 2022, she released her fourth album titled Long Hot Summer, and announced her first solo world tour in partnership with GLAAD. On September 13, 2023, Graham announced the TIME World Tour 2023/2024, where she intends to perform songs from her entire career.

== Other ventures ==
On August 31, 2011, Graham released her debut book, a collection of Neruda styled poems, The Blue Sky Chronicles.

In collaboration with Frank Elaridi and Bryant Wood, Kat Graham founded the wellness company Modern Nirvana in 2019. On October 18, 2022, in collaboration with Jennifer Sodini, Frank Elardi, Bryant Wood, and Illustrator Natalee Miller, Graham released The Modern Nirvana Oracle Deck: Awaken Your Intuition and Deepen Your Awareness -50 Cards & Guidebook.

She hosted with Deepak Chopra The Consciousness Collective Podcast from 2019 to 2020.

On June 7, 2023, Graham announced the release of her upcoming self-help book titled Seasons of You. It was released on November 14 the same year.

== Artistry ==
Graham cites Destiny's Child, The Beatles, Janet Jackson, M.I.A., Gwen Stefani, Spice Girls, Madonna, Grace Jones, and Prince as musical influences. She describes her sound as "vintage '90s with a modern twist."

== Personal life ==
Due to her multilingual upbringing, Graham speaks English, French, and Spanish, as well as some Hebrew and Portuguese.

Graham began dating actor Cottrell Guidry in 2008; they became engaged in October 2012. By December 2014, they had ended their relationship. From 2017 to 2023, Graham was in a relationship with producer and director Darren Genet, whom she was engaged to from 2022 until their breakup. In October 2023, it was announced that Graham had married her business partner, Bryant Wood, in Los Angeles. In March 2026, Graham announced that the couple welcomed a son.

Graham has been a vegan since 2012, having previously been vegetarian.

Since 2017, Graham has resided in Atlanta, Georgia, having previously lived in the Hollywood Hills neighborhood of Los Angeles.

In a 2023 interview with Kelly Clarkson, Graham disclosed that her mother had recently died from an unnamed illness.

== Filmography ==
=== Film ===
Year	Title	Role	Notes
1998	The Parent Trap	Jackie	
2004	Johnson Family Vacation	Dancer	
2009	17 Again	Jamie	
2011	The Roommate	Kim Johnson	
2011	Honey 2	Maria Ramirez	
2011	Dance Fu	Chaka Lovebell	Direct-to-video film
2012	Boogie Town	Ingrid	
2014	Addicted	Diamond	
2015	Muse	Muse	Short film and also producer
2017	All Eyez on Me	Jada Pinkett	
2017	Where's the Money	Alicia	
2018	How It Ends	Samantha	
2018	The Holiday Calendar	Abby Sutton	
2019	The Poison Rose	Rose	
2020	Cut Throat City	Demyra	
2020	Emperor	Delores	
2020	Operation Christmas Drop	Erica Miller	
2022	Rise of the Teenage Mutant Ninja Turtles: The Movie	April O'Neil (voice)	
2022	Heatwave	Claire Valens	Also executive producer
2022	Love in the Villa	Julie Hutton	
2025	Tyler Perry's Duplicity	Marley	
2025	The Move	Lee	Short film, also executive producer and directorial debut
2026	Michael	Diana Ross	Scenes deleted

=== Television ===
Year	Title	Role	Notes
2002	Lizzie McGuire	Posse Member #2	Episode: "You're a Good Man, Lizzie McGuire"
2003	Strong Medicine	Ashley Collins	Episode: "Degeneration"
2003	Malcolm in the Middle	Val	Episode: "Watching the Baby"
2004	Joan of Arcadia	Angela	Episode: "No Bad Guy"
2004	Like Family	Girl	Episode: "Romancing the Home"
2004	Grounded for Life	Laura	Episode: "Psycho Therapy"
2006	The O.C.	Kim	Episode: "The Undertow"
2006	CSI: Crime Scene Investigation	Tisha	Episode: "Poppin' Tags"
2007	Greek	Dancer	Episode: "The Rusty Nail"
2007	Hell on Earth	Felicia	Television film
2008–2009	Hannah Montana	Allison	3 episodes
2008	Our First Christmas	Bernie	Television film
2009–2017	The Vampire Diaries	Bonnie Bennett	Main cast
2012	Ridiculousness	Herself	Episode #2.12
2012	Oh Sit!	Herself	Episode #1.10
2013	Hell's Kitchen	Herself	Episode: "Winner Chosen"
2013	The Show with Vinny	Herself	Episode #1.7
2014	Whose Line Is It Anyway?	Herself	Episode #10.1
2015	Stalker	Christine Harper	Episode: "Love Kills"
2018–2020	Rise of the Teenage Mutant Ninja Turtles	April O'Neil	Main voice role
2019	Drop the Mic	Herself	Episode: "Kat Graham vs. Shameik Moore / Nikki Glaser vs. Brad Williams"
2019	Robot Chicken	Alex	Voice role; Episode: "Garfield Stockman in: A Voice Like Wet Ham"
2020	Fashionably Yours	Lauren	Television film
2020–present	Trolls: TrollsTopia	Rhythm & Blues	Main voice role
2021	Nickelodeon's Unfiltered	Herself	Episode: "Otter Docs & Polka Dots"
2022	The Masked Singer	Robogirl	Episode: "Muppets Night"

== Discography ==
=== Studio albums ===
Title	Year
Roxbury Drive	Released: September 25, 2015; Label: Sound Zoo Records; Formats: Digital download
Love Music Funk Magic	Released: June 2, 2017; Label: Sound Zoo Records; Formats: Digital download
Toro Gato: Part II (Deluxe Edition) (as Toro Gato)	Released: January 28, 2022; Label: Toro Gato; Formats: NFT, Cassette tape+Vinyl+NFT
Long Hot Summer	Released: June 3, 2022; Label: Sound Zoo Records; Formats: Digital download

=== EPs ===
Title	Year	Peak chart positions
Title	Year	US Heat
Remixes	Released: July 26, 2011; Label: Perezcious Records; Format: Free digital download	—
Against the Wall	Released: May 29, 2012; Label: A&M/Octone Records; Formats: CD, digital download	4
TORO GATO: PART I (as Toro Gato)	Released: September 10, 2021; Label: Toro Gato; Formats: NFT	—
TORO GATO: PART II (as Toro Gato)	Released: January 28, 2022; Label: Toro Gato; Formats: NFT	—
The Broken Hearts Club	Released: November 1, 2024; Label: Sound Zoo Records; Formats: digital download	—

=== Singles ===
==== As lead artist ====
Title	Year	Peak chart positions			Album
Title	Year	US	US Dance	UK Pop Club	Album
"I Want It All"	2010	—	—	—	Kat Graham (shelved)
"Sassy"	2010	—	—	—	Kat Graham (shelved)
"Cold Hearted Snake"	2010	—	—	—	Kat Graham (shelved)
"Put Your Graffiti on Me"	2012	—	5	—	Against the Wall
"Wanna Say"	2012	—	25	—	Against the Wall
"Power"	2013	—	—	—	Non-album single
"1991"	2015	—	—	—	Roxbury Drive
"Secrets" (featuring Babyface)	2015	—	—	—	Roxbury Drive
"All Your Love"	2016	—	—	—	Love Music Funk Magic
"Sometimes"	2017	—	4	6	Love Music Funk Magic
"If Eye Could Get UR Attention"	2018	—	—	2	Love Music Funk Magic
"SWIM" (as Toro Gato)	2021	—	—	—	TORO GATO: PART I
"Oprah Rich"	2022	—	—	—	Long Hot Summer
"Long Hot Summer"	2022	—	—	—	Long Hot Summer

==== As featured artist ====
Title	Year	Peak chart positions		Album
Title	Year	US	UK	Album
"I Got It from My Mama" (will.i.am featuring uncredited vocals by Kat Graham)	2007	31	38	Songs About Girls
"One More Chance" (will.i.am featuring uncredited vocals by Kat Graham)	2007	—	97	Songs About Girls
"The Donque Song" (will.i.am featuring Snoop Dogg and uncredited vocals by Kat Graham)	2007	—	—	Songs About Girls
"Dog Day Afternoon" (Ras Kass with Doc Hollywood featuring Kat Graham and Dirt Nasty)	2012	—	—	Spit No Evil

=== Music videos ===
==== As lead artist ====
Title	Year	Director(s)
"Boom Kat"	2009	Adam Forstadt
"My Boyfriend's Back"	2009	Kevin Boston
"I Want It All"	2010	Lance Drake
"Sassy"	2010	Adam Forstadt and Paul Hogan
"Cold Hearted Snake"	2010	Kevin Boston
"Love Will Do Without An Escapade"	2011	Bille Woodruff
"Heartkiller" (Lyric Video)	2012	Roi Hernandez
"Put Your Graffiti on Me"	2012	Benny Boom
"Wanna Say"	2013	Benny Boom
"Power" (Lyric Video)	2013	Kat Graham
"Power"	2013	Byron Atienza
"1991"	2015	Dano Cerny
"1991" (Cities at Night Remix Version)	2015	Laurence Shanet and Morgan Miller
"Secrets"	2015	Darren Genet
"Star F*cker"	2016	Roi Hernandez by Electric Giant Limited
"All Your Love"	2016	Darren Genet
"Sometimes"	2017	Marc Cleary and Oskar Rodriguez
"Magic"	2017	Dennis Leupold
"Time = $"	2018	Marc Cleary and Oskar Rodriguez
"Baby"	2018	Marc Cleary and Oskar Rodriguez
"Off"	2018	Marc Cleary and Oskar Rodriguez
"Just Luv Me"	2018	Marc Cleary and Oskar Rodriguez
"Glory"	2018	Marc Cleary
"Dia De Los Muertos"	2018	Marc Cleary
"SWIM"	2021	Darren Genet ASC
"White Flag"	2022	Darren Genet ASC
"The Broken Hearts Club"	2024	Santiago Traverso
"Revenge"	2025	—N/a

==== As featured artist ====
Participation in music videos as actress, dancer, singer, etc.
Title	Year	Other artist(s)	Director(s)
"Slacker"	2002	Tech N9ne	Ben Mor
"Why I Love You"	2002	B2K	Erik White
"Wanna B Where U R (ThisIzzaLuvSong)"	2003	Floetry featuring Mos Def	Nzingha Stewart
"No L.O.V.E."	2003	Jhené Aiko	None
"Salt Shaker"	2003	Ying Yang Twins featuring Lil Jon & The East Side Boyz	Nzingha Stewart
"The Way I Am"	2003	Knoc-Turn'al featuring Snoop Dogg	Gil Green
"Used to Love U"	2004	John Legend	Ben Mor
"Lonely"	2005	Akon	Gil Green
"What If"	2005	112	Fat Cats
"What You Want (When U Want It)"	2006	The Frontline	Rock Jacobs
"B.U.D.D.Y."	2007	Musiq Soulchild	Sanaa Hamri
"One More Chance"	2008	will.i.am	Scott Speer
"Siempre Ausente"	2008	AKWID	Sam Ketay and Zosimo Maximo
"Somebody to Love (Remix)"	2010	Justin Bieber featuring Usher	Dave Meyers
"Just a Dream"	2010	Nelly	Sanji
"Looking for Love"	2011	Diddy & Dirty Money featuring Usher	Colin Tilley
"Broken Down"	2011	Kevin Hammond	Tim Nackashi
"Black and Jewish (Black and Yellow Parody)"	2011	Kali Hawk and Kat Graham	James Davis and Rachel Goldenberg
"Really Don't Care"	2014	Demi Lovato featuring Cher Lloyd	Ryan Pallotta

== Tour ==
- The Fantanas (2004–2006)
- The Black Eyed Peas Black Blue & You Tour (2007)
- The Vampire Diaries Tour – Q&A With The Cast (2010)
- 2012 National Promo Tour (2012)
- Long Hot Summer World Tour (2022)
- The TIME Tour (2023–2024)

== Awards and nominations ==
Year	Award	Category	Work	Result
2010	Teen Choice Awards	Scene Stealer Female	The Vampire Diaries	Nominated
2011	Teen Choice Awards	Scene Stealer Female	The Vampire Diaries	Won
2011	Youth Rock Awards	Rockin' Actress (TV)	The Vampire Diaries	Nominated
2012	Teen Choice Awards	Actress Fantasy/Sci-Fi	The Vampire Diaries	Nominated
2013	Teen Choice Awards	Actress Fantasy/Sci-Fi	The Vampire Diaries	Nominated
2014	Teen Choice Awards	Actress Fantasy/Sci-Fi	The Vampire Diaries	Nominated
2014	Black Women in Film Association	Creative Award	Contributions in the industry	Won
2015	MTV Fandom Awards	MTV Ship of The Year (with Ian Somerhalder)	The Vampire Diaries	Nominated
2015	Teen Choice Awards	Choice TV: Chemistry (with Ian Somerhalder)	The Vampire Diaries	Nominated
2015	Teen Choice Awards	Choice TV: Scene Stealer	The Vampire Diaries	Nominated
2016	Teen Choice Awards	Actress Fantasy/Sci-Fi	The Vampire Diaries	Nominated
2016	Teen Choice Awards	Choice TV: Chemistry (with Ian Somerhalder)	The Vampire Diaries	Nominated
2017	Teen Choice Awards	Choice Sci-Fi/Fantasy TV Actress	The Vampire Diaries	Won
2019	Westfield Film Festival	Humanitarian award	Work with refugees, animals and human rights activism	Won
2020	PETA: 40th Anniversary and Holiday Party	Humanitarian Award	Animal activism	Won
2021	World Influencers and Bloggers Awards	Human Rights Advocate		Won
2024	Outdoor Film Festival	Taurus Award	Contribution to Film	Won
