= Put Your Graffiti on Me =

Single by Kat Graham

from the EP Against the Wall
- Released: March 26, 2012
- Genre: Dance-pop
- Length: 2:51
- Label: A&M/Octone
- Songwriters: Lewis Hughes, Nicholas Audino, Matthew Bair, Samuel Watters

Kat Graham singles chronology
"Cold Hearted Snake" (2010)	"Put Your Graffiti on Me" (2012)	"Wanna Say" (2012)

"Put Your Graffiti on Me" is the official debut single from actress Kat Graham. It is taken from her debut extended play Against the Wall (2012). The song was produced by Australian Production Duo Twice as Nice. It was released for digital download on March 26, 2012, with the music video being released the following day. "Graffiti" became Graham's first charting song, after it debuted on the Billboard Hot Dance Club Songs chart in the United States. The song peaked at number 5, after spending six weeks on the chart.

== Music video ==
The music video was released on March 27, 2012, and was meant to heavily involve dancing. Sheryl Murakami was the choreographer for the video.

== Charts ==
Chart (2012)	Peak position
US Dance Club Songs (Billboard)	5
