= Dante Santiago =

American music executive (born 1970)

- Also known as: The Voice; 5th Pea; The Stamp
- Born: Danté Hauve Santiago; November 9, 1970 (age 55); Inglewood, California, U.S.
- Genres: Pop; hip hop; R&B
- Occupations: Singer; songwriter; record producer; record executive
- Instrument: Vocals
- Years active: 1988–present
- Labels: Ghettro Inc; will.i.am; Ruthless; Interscope
- Formerly of: Black Eyed Peas; Broshigeez
- Spouse: Catherine Santiago (m. 2015)

Dante Hauve Santiago (born November 9, 1970) is an American music executive, singer and co-owner of Ghettro Inc. He is best known for his work with Black Eyed Peas, being a founding member of the group during the early 1990s and as A&R and vocalist in the 2000s for will.i.am Music Group. Throughout his career, Santiago has worked with a number of musical artists, including Michael Jackson, Whitney Houston & Chris Brown.

In 2012, Santiago joined will.i.am as coach advisor on The Voice UK from seasons 1–5. He also served as executive producer for will.i.am's solo album willpower (2013). and Britney Spears "The Essential Britney Spears" album.

== Career ==
=== Black Eyed Peas, solo artist and A&R ===
In 1988, Santiago began his music career as a singer and dancer. In 1992, he collaborated with rappers will.i.am and apl.de.ap of the Atban Klann, a hip hop group signed to Eazy-E's Ruthless Records. Due to Eazy's death in 1995, Will and Apl left Ruthless, formed a trio with Santiago and changed their name to Black Eyed Peas. After including friend Taboo, they recorded demos and performed at several shows. Later in the year, Santiago left the group. He joined the group Broshigeez in 1998 with Huck Finn, Rawcel and NIU recording their selftitled Ep BRO.S.H.I.G.E.E.Z. They released the singles, "Put It On Ya" feat apl and Taboo of Black Eyed Peas, "Achin" and "In The Mood" in 2002. He rejoined Black Eyed Peas in late 2002 and brought in his friend Fergie who became the group's joint lead vocalist. He performed vocals on several of their hit songs, including "Hey Mama". and "Let's Get It Started", which won the Grammy for Best Rap Performance by a Duo or Group. As a solo artist Santiago's first two singles, "It's OK" and "Nasty Like Us", both appeared on the soundtrack to National Lampoon's Jake's Booty Call. On will.i.am's Must B 21 album, he appeared on the song "Sumthin' Special" while also releasing his first extended play, Inside Te's World. Santiago also managed to work with some of music's top artists, recording vocals on songs by Busta Rhymes "I Love My Bitch", Too Short feat Snoop Dogg will.i.am "Keep Bouncin'", Mariah Carey "Heat" and Sérgio Mendes "Mas que Nada".

In 2003 Santiago went from Artist to Executive and was hired as A&R Music Coordinator for the peas breakthrough album Elephunk and 2005's Monkey Business, also featuring on the song "Dum Diddly". He was promoted to Creative A&R for Fergie's solo debut The Dutchess in 2006, which had three Billboard Hot 100 number-one singles "Glamorous", "Big Girls Don't Cry" and "London Bridge". Santiago recorded his next LPDanté and was the opening act for Black Eyed Peas Monkey Business Tour in 2005–06. Santiago was A&R on a lot of will.i.am's productions outside of the peas including Michael Jackson. In the studio with Jackson they recorded new material and songs which were a part of the Thriller 25 anniversary album. In 2007 he continued as Creative A&R for will.i.am's next album Songs About Girls featuring on the song "Impatient" which was eventually remixed in 2008 by singer Estelle for the song "American Boy" featuring Kanye West. In 2009, he was promoted to A&R on the next two Black Eyed Peas albums. First on The E.N.D. which went to number #1 on the Billboard Hot 200 charts and the combined singles of "Boom Boom Pow" and "I Gotta Feeling" went on a record breaking 26 consecutive weeks at number #1 on the Billboard Hot 100 and for The Beginning with the hit single "The Time (Dirty Bit)". Later in 2010 Santiago left tour to work with LMFAO on their next album Sorry for Party Rocking. This is when he suggested to Redfoo the first single should be "Party Rock Anthem" January 2011. The song went to number #1 which topped the charts in the United States, United Kingdom, Australia, Belgium, Brazil, Canada, Denmark, France, Germany, Ireland, New Zealand, Switzerland.

=== Ghettro Inc, The Voice UK and executive producer ===
Having success with the Black Eyed Peas and LMFAO, in 2011 Santiago started his first business venture Ghettro Inc. The label released "F.U.M.C." by DJ Homicide feat SkyBlu of LMFAO and GoonRock. The video was directed by Anthony Chirco with cameos by Nas, Redfoo, Simon Rex aka Dirt Nasty, Fatlip of The Pharcyde, Taboo, Chuckie and DJ Lethal of House of Pain and Limp Bizkit. While on tour in Montreal, Santiago met designer CatG and they collaborated on outfits for his stage shows. Santiago then launched the fashion line, called Ghettro by CatG.

In 2012, Santiago joined will.i.am as Coach Advisor on The Voice UK and on The Voice Australia (2014). Also in 2012 Danny O'Donoghue of The Script and co-judge on The Voice UK asked for Santiago's help to recruit will.i.am for the song "Hall of Fame". Santiago continued working with will.i.am on his fourth solo album #willpower as Executive Producer and Head of A&R under his production company Ghettro Music and featured on the song "The World Is Crazy". It spawned the hit singles "This Is Love" featuring Eva Simons, "Scream and Shout" featuring Britney Spears and "#thatPower" featuring Justin Bieber. In 2013 Santiago also served as Executive Producer on Britney Spears "The Essential Britney Spears" album and in 2016, he was Associate Producer for the peas video #WHERESTHELOVE? (pt. 2).

Ghettro signed recording artists, The Voice UK (series 2) participant Lyndrik Xela and actress Damoni Burkhardt. Releasing Xela's debut Ep Get To Know U (Part 1) and Burkhardt's song "I'm Free (Watch Me Go)" in 2020 with (195k) on different streaming platforms. Burkhardt also starred in the short lived TV Series "YA" a spin off from The Bay. After a four-year hiatus, Santiago rejoined The Recording Academy in 2024 as a voting member for its Los Angeles Chapter. In August 2025, Ghettro released Burkhardt's new singles, "The One" (228k streams) followed a week later by the song "Burning Room" a collaboration with Rhyan Besco (95.8k streams) and a third single on Halloween called "What You Want" with (102k streams) to date on Spotify. Santiago recently via his Instagram, announced plans for an upcoming album called The Stamp, to be released in the future, along with new projects by Xela and Burkhardt.

== Discography ==
=== Studio albums ===
- Inside Te's World (2003)
- Dante (2006)

=== As lead artist ===
| Title | Year | Label |
|---|---|---|
| "Get Off the Wall" (as of a member of Black Eyed Peas) | 1995 | iam |
| BRO.S.H.I.G.E.E.Z. (as of a member of Broshigeez) | 1998 | apl.de.ap |
| "It's OK" (777 Kamikaze and Dante Santiago) | 2003 | BBE |
| "Nasty Like Us" (Dante Santiago feat Donnie No Good) | 2003 | iam |
| "Nasty Like Us" (Rerelease) (Dante Santiago feat Donnie No Good) | 2021 | Ghettro Inc |

=== As featured artist ===
| Title | Year | Label |
|---|---|---|
| "Mountain Top" (Atban Klann feat. Dante Santiago and Mr. Shaw) | 1994 | Ruthless Records |
| "Focus on You" (Atban Klann feat. Dante Santiago and Dandilion) | 1994 | Ruthless Records |
| "Duet" (Atban Klann feat. Dante Santiago and Dandilion) | 1994 | Ruthless Records |
| "Sumthin' Special" (feat NIU, Dante Santiago and Taboo) | 2003 | BBE |
| "Dum Diddly" (Black Eyed Peas feat Dante Santiago) | 2005 | iam/Interscope |
| "As the Road Gets Rough" (777 Kamikaze feat Dante Santiago) | 2007 | 777 Kamikaze |
| "Impatient" (will.i.am feat Dante Santiago) | 2007 | iam/Interscope |
| "We Keep It Going" (777 Kamikaze feat Dante Santiago) | 2007 | 777 Kamikaze |
| "The World Is Crazy" (will.i.am feat Dante Santiago) | 2013 | iam/Interscope |

=== Collaborations ===
| Title | Year | Album |
|---|---|---|
| "Hey Mama" (Black Eyed Peas featuring Tippa Irie) | 2004 | Elephunk |
| "Let's Get It Started" (Black Eyed Peas) | 2004 | Elephunk |
| "My Style" (bep featuring Justin Timberlake and Timbaland) | 2005 | Monkey Business |
| "They Don't Want Music" (The Black Eyed Peas featuring James Brown) | 2005 | Monkey Business |
| "I Love My Bitch" (Busta Rhymes featuring Kelis and will.i.am) | 2006 | The Big Bang |
| "Mas que Nada" (Sérgio Mendes featuring the Black Eyed Peas) | 2006 | Timeless |
| "Keep Bouncin'" (Too Short feat will.i.am and Snoop Dogg) | 2006 | Blow the Whistle |
| "Heat" (Mariah Carey) | 2008 | E=MC² |
| "Imma Be" (Black Eyed Peas) | 2009 | The E.N.D |

=== Ghettro Inc ===
| Title | Year | Label |
|---|---|---|
| "I'm Free (Watch Me Go)" (Damoni) | 2020 | Ghettro Inc |
| Get To Know U (Part 1) (Lyndrik Xela) | 2020 | Ghettro Inc |
| "Nasty Like Us" (Rerelease) (Dante Santiago feat Donnie No Good) | 2021 | Ghettro Inc |
| "Long Island" (beem! feat Damoni) from the LP nise tenshi (deluxe) | 2025 | Tempest7/Ghettro Inc |
| "The One" (Damoni) | 2025 | Ghettro Inc |
| "Burning Room" (Damoni x Rhyan Besco) | 2025 | Ghettro Inc |
| "What You Want" (Damoni) | 2025 | Ghettro Inc |

== Filmography ==
=== Television ===
| Year | Title | Role | Notes |
|---|---|---|---|
| 2012–2016 | The Voice UK | Himself | Coach Advisor |

| Year | Title | Role | Notes |
|---|---|---|---|
| 2014 | The Voice Australia | Himself | Coach Advisor |

== Tours ==
Headlining

- 1992: Balistyx album release party (at Whisky a Go Go)
- 1994: Atban Klann
- 1995: Black Eyed Peas

Opening act

- 1999-2000: BRO.S.H.I.G.E.E.Z. (opening for Burning Star)
- 2001: BRO.S.H.I.G.E.E.Z. (opening for Black Eyed Peas)
- 2005: Opening act for John Legend (Sydney, AU)
- 2006: Inside Te's World Tour (opening for Black Eyed Peas)

Featured Artist

- 2003: Coachella Festival (with Black Eyed Peas)
- 2003: Elephunk Tour
- 2004: Fly or Die Tour (with bep and N.E.R.D.)
- 2004: Glastonbury Festival (with Black Eyed Peas)
- 2005–06: Monkey Business Tour
- 2007: Live Earth Festival (with Black Eyed Peas)
- 2009–10: The E.N.D. World Tour
- 2011: The Beginning World Tour
- 2013-15 #willpower Tour (with will.i.am)
