= Heartbreaker (will.i.am song) =

2008 single by will.i.am

Single by will.i.am featuring Cheryl Cole

from the album Songs About Girls
- Released: May 5, 2008 (Cheryl Cole remix)
- Recorded: 2007
- Genre: Pop; R&B
- Length: 5:30 (12-inch club mix); 3:15 (7-inch radio edit)
- Label: will.i.am; A&M
- Songwriter: William Adams
- Producer: will.i.am

will.i.am singles chronology
"The Girl Is Mine 2008" (2008)	"Heartbreaker" (2008)	"In the Ayer" (2008)

Cheryl Cole singles chronology
"Heartbreaker" (2008)	"Fight for This Love" (2009)

Music video
- "Heartbreaker" on YouTube

"Heartbreaker" is the second single from rapper will.i.am's third album Songs About Girls. The British single version features guest vocals from Cheryl Cole; this version was also featured on Cole's debut solo album 3 Words, which was released in October 2009.

== Background ==
Cheryl Cole's vocals and appearance in the music video came as a result of the ITV2 television show The Passions of Girls Aloud which was filmed in late 2007. In the show, Cole learned the art of street dancing, and would ultimately audition for the will.i.am music video. She received the part and would also contribute guest vocals to the song, singing a new part of the chorus and replacing the original anonymous female singer in the break down. will.i.am said the record company suggested Cole, and after meeting her, he felt the idea was perfect. The duo performed the song unedited on The Graham Norton Show on 24 April 2008. At a promotional appearance on GMTV, will.i.am said that Cheryl was "hotter than Nelly Furtado."

== Charts ==
The album version of the song entered the UK Singles Chart at number 74 on downloads alone, before rising to number 49 the next week. The song entered the top twenty two weeks later. After two weeks at number eight, "Heartbreaker" peaked at number four the week of its physical release. The single sold over 400,000 copies, giving the single a gold certification by the BPI, and became the 31st best selling single of 2008. "Heartbreaker" also debuted at number 49 on the Irish Singles Chart, and has peaked at number seven after spending two weeks at number 10. It is the artist's first hit single since he started his solo project. ECD:UK added two versions of the song but it reached no.1 by one video edit alone. It also marks Cole's nineteenth consecutive top ten single and 21st (in total) in the UK, both as a solo act and as part of Girls Aloud. "Heartbreaker" was Cole's debut in continental Europe.

== Music video ==
The music video begins with various shots of will.i.am and Cheryl Cole in front of a black background with flashing lights. As the first verse begins, will.i.am sings in front of the black background while controlling and/or holding a glowing red ball a la telekinesis. He is also seen in a convertible with a girl, while they look at moving stars. will.i.am dances using the famous Michael Jackson slide from "Billie Jean" in front of the black, with a spotlight shining on one of various women posing next to him. One of the women is Cole, who can be seen with will.i.am or singing her lines in front of moving lights. The light turns off of her when her lines have finished, and shots of different women grinding on will.i.am are shown. He moves star-like lights with his hands, like the red ball from the beginning of the music video. The stars, which are people wearing black bodysuits with lights attached, mimic will.i.am's dancing. A number of clips of will.i.am and Cole singing and dancing, both together and separately, are shown throughout the remainder of the video.

== Track listing ==
- UK CD single
1. "Heartbreaker" (Remix) (featuring Cheryl Cole) – 3:15
2. "Impatient" (Gutter Remix) – 4:43
- Digital download
1. "Heartbreaker" (Remix) (featuring Cheryl Cole) – 3:15
2. "Heartbreaker" (music video) – 3:21

== Charts ==
=== Weekly charts ===
Chart (2007–2008)	Peak position
CIS Airplay (TopHit)	9
Denmark (Tracklisten)	24
Czech Republic Airplay (ČNS IFPI)	41
Europe (European Hot 100)	11
Ireland (IRMA)	7
Russia Airplay (TopHit)	5
Scottish Singles Sales (Official Charts)	10
UK Singles (Official Charts)	4
UK Hip Hop/R&B (Official Charts)	3

=== Year-end charts ===
Chart (2007)	Position
CIS (TopHit)	145
Russia Airplay (TopHit)	131

Chart (2008)	Position
CIS (TopHit)	47
Russia Airplay (TopHit)	40
UK Singles (OCC)	31
UK Urban (Music Week)	9

=== Decade-end charts ===
Decade-end chart performance for "Heartbreaker"
Chart (2000–2009)	Position
CIS Airplay (TopHit)	74
Russia Airplay (TopHit)	66

== Certifications ==
Region	Certification	Certified units/sales
United Kingdom (BPI)	Gold	400,000^{‡}
^{‡} Sales+streaming figures based on certification alone.

== Release history ==
Release dates and formats for "Heartbreaker"
Region	Date	Format	Label	Ref.
United Kingdom	May 5, 2008	CD single	Polydor	
