= Freedom Writers (soundtrack) =

Soundtrack album by various artists
- Released: January 9, 2007
- Recorded: 1992–2007
- Genre: Hip hop
- Label: Hollywood Records

Singles from Freedom Writers
- 1. "A Dream" Released: 2006

Professional ratings
Review scores
| Source | Rating |
|---|---|
| Allmusic | link |
| Okayplayer | link |

Freedom Writers (Music from the Motion Picture) is the soundtrack album for the 2007 film Freedom Writers. The soundtrack is mainly composed of hip hop songs from the early 1990s, but also contains new songs by will.i.am, Mark Isham and Talib Kweli amongst others.

== Track listing ==
| # | Title | Songwriters | Producer(s) | Performer (s) |
|---|---|---|---|---|
| 1 | "A Dream" | L. Lynn, W. Adams, M.L. King Jr. | will.i.am | Common, will.i.am |
| 2 | "Listen!!!" | T.K. Greene, K. Holland, F. Williams | Kwamé | Talib Kweli |
| 3 | "It's R Time [Lenky Remix]" | J. Ortega, V. Santiago, L. Vazquez, R. Ramirez, K. Ravenell, E. Almonte | Kevin “Raze” Ravenell | Jeannie Ortega |
| 4 | "When the Ship Goes Down (Diamond D Remix)" | L. Freese, L. Muggerud, L. Dickens | DJ Muggs | Cypress Hill |
| 5 | "Hip Hop Hooray" | V. Brown, A. Criss, K. Gist, E. Isley, Ru. Isley, Ro. Isley, O. Isley, M. Isley | Naughty by Nature | Naughty by Nature |
| 6 | "Keep Ya Head Up" | T. Shakur, D. Anderson, S. Vincent, R. Troutman | DJ Daryl | 2Pac |
| 7 | "Code of the Streets" | K. Elam, C. Martin, R. Russell | DJ Premier | Gang Starr |
| 8 | "Rebirth of Slick (Cool Like Dat)" | I. Butler, C. Irving, M. Vieira, J. Williams | Butterfly | Digable Planets |
| 9 | "Officer" | T. Hardson, J. Martinez, R. Robinson, D. Stewart, E. Wilcox | J-Swift | The Pharcyde |
| 10 | "This Is How We Do It" | M. Jordan, O. Pierce, R. Walters | Montell Jordan, Oji Pierce | Montell Jordan |
| 11 | "Colors" | W. Adams | will.i.am | will.i.am |
| 12 | "Bus Ride" | W. Adams | will.i.am | will.i.am |
| 13 | "Riots" | M. Isham, W. Adams | *?* | Mark Isham, Miri Ben-Ari, will.i.am |
| 14 | "Eva's Theme" | M. Isham | *?* | Mark Isham |
| 15 | "Anne Frank" | M. Isham | *?* | Mark Isham, Miri Ben-Ari |

== Chart positions ==
| Chart (2007) | Peak position |
|---|---|
| US Top R&B/Hip Hop Albums | 100 |
| US Top Soundtracks | 17 |
