= Mail on Sunday (album) =

2008 second studio album by Flo Rida

Studio album by Flo Rida
- Released: March 18, 2008
- Recorded: 2007–08
- Genres: Pop rap; Southern hip hop
- Length: 53:21
- Labels: Poe Boy; Atlantic
- Producers: Chase N. Cashe; Honorable C.N.O.T.E.; Fatboi; Deputy; DISNEYFX; DJ Frank E; Firstborn; Gorilla Tek; Hit-Boy; J. R. Rotem; Javon "4Mil" Thomas; Kane Beatz; Timbaland; will.i.am; Christopher Spitfiya Lanier; Dylan "3-D" Dresdow; Young Juve

Flo Rida chronology
Mr Birthday Man (2007)	Mail on Sunday (2008)	R.O.O.T.S. (2009)

Singles from Mail on Sunday
- 1. "Low" Released: October 9, 2007; 2. "Elevator" Released: February 11, 2008; 3. "In the Ayer" Released: May 20, 2008

Mail on Sunday is the debut studio album by American rapper Flo Rida, and was released on March 18, 2008 under Poe Boy Entertainment and Atlantic Records, serving as Flo Rida's follow-up to his 2007 mixtape Mr. Birthday Man. It spawned three singles; the first, "Low" was number one on the U.S. Billboard Hot 100 for 10 weeks. The second, and third singles, "Elevator", and "In the Ayer", were successful as well, being top 20 hits. "Roll" featuring Sean Kingston was not an official single, but it managed to peak at number 59 on the US Billboard Hot 100, and number 43 on the Canadian Hot 100 due to digital sales in both countries.

== Music ==
T-Pain, who laced the first single, is only one of the many featured guests throughout the album. Timbaland, who produced the second single "Elevator", is also featured on the track. Rick Ross, and Trey Songz made appearances as well. Lil Wayne has also been added to the list with assistance by young Memphian, Jamil Smith, while Sean Kingston appears on the J. R. Rotem-produced "Roll" the concept was created, and co-written by Compton rapper Spitfiya, from The Bullets Production Team, Various other guests include Birdman, Brisco. The third single is "In the Ayer" featuring will.i.am. The fourth single was scheduled to be "Money Right" featuring Brisco, and Rick Ross, but was canceled due to the release of his upcoming second studio album R.O.O.T.S. His second collaboration with T-Pain, "I Bet", his collaboration with Trina, named "Bout It" and as well as his second collaboration with Sean Kingston named "OG", all three didn't make the final track list, but were recorded. As for production, J. R. Rotem, DJ Montay, and Timbaland all provided tracks for Mail on Sunday, among others.

== Critical reception ==
Professional ratings
Aggregate scores
Source	Rating
Metacritic	54/100
Review scores
Source	Rating
AllMusic	2.5/5 stars
Entertainment Weekly	B+
The Guardian	3/5 stars
HipHopDX	2.5/5 stars
Los Angeles Times	2/4 stars
NOW	2/5 Ns
RapReviews	7/10 stars
Robert Christgau	(dud)
Rolling Stone	2/5 stars
Slant Magazine	1/5 stars

Mail on Sunday garnered mixed reviews from music critics. At Metacritic, which assigns a normalized rating out of 100 to reviews from mainstream critics, the album received an average score of 54, based on 12 reviews.

Steve 'Flash' Juon of RapReviews praised the album for containing great production and tracks that are potential singles but found the artist on said album lacking in identity, concluding with, "When you try to come up with positive comparisons to other artists, you realize just how derivative Flo Rida is. He's a little bit Twista, a little bit Trick Daddy, and a whole lot Nelly. None of those things are negative, but the fact he can't distinguish himself from any of them isn't a positive. I'd like to see Flo Rida convince me why he's special with his next album - until then he's just another MC with a well produced album who came out of a cookie cutter hitmaking mold." Joseph Barracato of Entertainment Weekly also praised the production for having "ferocious beats" and "infectious hooks," and gave credit to Flo Rida for delivering female anatomy metaphors in a creative way. Billboard writer Jeff Vrabel said that, "Flo Rida's flow is an engaging/ringy-dingy/he-sounds-like-Nelly thing. But his hooks can be rock-solid ("Ack Like You Know") and his interest in gleaming synthesizerism (opener "American Superstar" comes into "Tubular Bells" territory, really) helps set him off from the legions of rappers clawing over each other to break out of the South."

AllMusic's Andy Kellman said that, "Though Flo Rida has his own identity – for all the tough talk and the automotives fixation, he does come off as big-hearted, and he could just as easily make an R&B album – and covers more bases than what is typical from other mainstream-yet-street rap albums of 2007 and 2008, he's not nearly as distinctive as any of his predecessors." Robert Christgau graded the album as a "dud", indicating "a bad record whose details rarely merit further thought." Rolling Stone's Christian Hoard found the album trying hard to replicate the success of "Low" but found the tracks to be "generic pop rap" and both the production and vocal delivery "standard-issue." Wilson McBee of Slant Magazine criticized the record's tired use of party tracks, phoned in contributions, and misogynistic lyrical content, concluding that "unless he can once again catch the coattails of T-Pain or some other hit-magnet, odds are that he’ll be beginning his descent back into anonymity very soon."

== Sales ==
Mail on Sunday debuted at number four on the US Billboard 200 chart, selling 86,000 copies in its first week. As of May, 2009, the album has sold 390,000 copies in the US. It has been certified silver for sales in the UK.

== Track listing ==
Credits adapted from the album's liner notes.

No.	Title	Writer(s)	Producer(s)	Length
1.	"American Superstar" (featuring Lil Wayne)	Tramar Dillard; Carlton Mays; Darius Stanley; Dwayne Carter	Honorable C.N.O.T.E.	3:40
2.	"Ack Like You Know"	Dillard; Jamil Pierre	Deputy	3:45
3.	"Elevator" (featuring Timbaland)	Dillard; Timothy Mosley; Hannon Lane	Timbaland; Hannon Lane (co.)	3:50
4.	"Roll" (featuring Sean Kingston)	Dillard; Jonathan Rotem; Sly Jordan; Christopher Lanier	J. R. Rotem	4:00
5.	"Low" (featuring T-Pain)	Dillard; Montay Humphrey; T-Pain	DJ Montay	3:50
6.	"Priceless" (featuring Birdman)	Dillard; Chauncey Hollis; Jesse Woodward; Bryan Williams; Theron Thomas; Timothy Thomas	Hit-Boy; Chase N. Cashe	3:52
7.	"Ms. Hangover"	Dillard; Rotem; Jordan	J. R. Rotem	3:57
8.	"Still Missin"	Dillard; Daniel Johnson; André Benjamin; Patrick Brown; Ray Murray; Antwan Patton; Rico Wade	Kane Beatz	4:40
9.	"In the Ayer" (featuring will.i.am)	Dillard; William Adams; Tony Butler	will.i.am	3:40
10.	"Me & U"	Dillard; Justin Franks; Bosco Kante; David Gamson; Roger Troutman	DJ Frank E	4:30
11.	"All My Life"	Dillard; LaDamon Douglas	FATBOI	3:33
12.	"Don't Know How to Act" (featuring Yung Joc)	Dillard; Mays; Courtney Travis; Jasiel Robinson	Honorable C.N.O.T.E	3:33
13.	"Freaky Deaky" (featuring Trey Songz)	Dillard; Tony Castillo; Amir Williams	Gorilla Tek Drum Majorz	3:17
14.	"Money Right" (featuring Rick Ross & Brisco)	Dillard; Javon Thomas; William Roberts; British Mitchell	Javon "4Mill" Thomas	3:16

Best Buy bonus tracks
No.	Title	Producer(s)	Length
15.	"Gotta Eat"	Young Juve	3:52
16.	"Make a Wish"	Firstborn	4:06

iTunes Store bonus tracks
No.	Title	Producer(s)	Length
15.	"Low" (featuring T-Pain) (Travis Barker remix)	DJ Montay; Travis Barker	4:15

Japanese bonus tracks
No.	Title	Producer(s)	Length
15.	"Birthday" (featuring Rick Ross)	The Runners	5:04
16.	"Low" (featuring T-Pain) (Travis Barker remix)	DJ Montay; Travis Barker	4:14

Japanese special edition bonus tracks
No.	Title	Producer(s)	Length
17.	"Gotta Eat"	Young Juve	3:53
18.	"Make a Wish"	Firstborn	4:07
19.	"Fast Life"	All Star	3:27
20.	"Low" (featuring T-Pain) (Freedombunch mix)	DJ Montay; Freedombunch	3:53

Amazon bonus track
No.	Title	Producer(s)	Length
15.	"Radio"	Kane Beatz	3:42

Sample credits

- "Still Missin'" contains elements of "Jazzy Belle", written by André Benjamin, Patrick Brown, Ray Murray, Antwan Patton, and Rico Wade.
- "In the Ayer" contains interpolations from "Jam the Box", written by Tony Butler.
- "Me & U" contains samples and elements from the Roger recording "Emotions", written by David Gamson and Roger Troutman.

== Charts and certifications ==
=== Weekly charts ===
Chart (2008)	Peak position
Australian Albums (ARIA)	21
Belgian Albums (Ultratop Flanders)	39
Canadian Albums (Billboard)	4
French Albums (SNEP)	129
German Albums (Offizielle Top 100)	50
Irish Albums (IRMA)	57
New Zealand Albums (RMNZ)	14
Scottish Albums (Official Charts)	53
Swiss Albums (Schweizer Hitparade)	60
UK Albums (Official Charts)	29
US Billboard 200	4
US Top R&B/Hip-Hop Albums (Billboard)	3
US Top Rap Albums (Billboard)	2

=== Certifications ===
Region	Certification	Certified units/sales
Australia (ARIA)	Gold	35,000^{^}
Canada (Music Canada)	Gold	50,000^{^}
United Kingdom (BPI)	Gold	100,000^{^}
^{^} Shipments figures based on certification alone.

=== Year-end charts ===
Chart (2008)	Position
Australian Albums (ARIA)	66
US Billboard 200	121
US Top R&B/Hip-Hop Albums (Billboard)	54
US Top Rap Albums (Billboard)	24

== See also ==
- 2008 in hip hop
