= I Got It from My Mama =

Single by will.i.am

from the album Songs About Girls
- Released: July 31, 2007
- Recorded: 2006–2007
- Studio: Hollywood, California; (The Record Plant)
- Genre: Hip hop; electropop; dirty rap
- Length: 4:03
- Label: will.i.am; A&M
- Songwriters: William Adams; Jean-Luc Drion; Dominique Régiacorte
- Producer: will.i.am

Will.i.am singles chronology
"A Dream" (2007)	"I Got It from My Mama" (2007)	"Baby Love" (2007)

Music video
- "I Got It from My Mama" on YouTube

"I Got It from My Mama" is a hip hop song by American rapper will.i.am. The uncredited female vocals in the song are from singer Kat Graham. It was released as the lead single from will.i.am's third solo album, Songs About Girls. It's primarily about the inheritance of sexual attractiveness of women through their mother's genetics. The song contains samples of "Don Quichotte" by Magazine 60 and "Take Me to the Mardi Gras" by Bob James; Magazine 60 group members Jean-Luc Drion and Dominique Régiacorte are credited as co-writers on "I Got It from My Mama".

This song was #64 on MTV Asia's list of Top 100 Hits of 2007. will.i.am later released a remix of "I Got It from My Mama", which included a sample from Daft Punk's "Around the World". Daft Punk denied will.i.am use of the sample. However, a music video was produced with the sample included and featuring the Paradiso Girls. The opening scene for all of Daft Punk's Human After All videos is used for the video.

== Chart performance ==
"I Got It from My Mama" debuted at number #93 on the Billboard Hot 100. The next week, the song climbed 36 places to number #57. Ultimately, the song peaked at number #31. In Canada, it debuted at #41, the second-highest new entry on the chart that week.

== Music video ==
The video for "I Got It from My Mama" was announced on the Black Eyed Peas' official website on July 26, 2007, along with a preview of it. It was fully released on August 2, 2007. The video begins with will.i.am opening a magazine of girls and then the camera descends onto will.i.am sitting on a chair on a Brazilian beach. There are girls walking around and flaunting their bodies to the camera. The video then shows will.i.am singing with the girls while they dance all over him and him sitting on a chair singing.

In the middle of the video it shows will.i.am on a chair with the girls lying on towels facing him, with an over view on them singing to the camera. At the last verse it shows will.i.am and the same girls at a beach party at night. The video concludes with will.i.am singing at the beach again with the girls and ends with a picture of will.i.am in the magazine saying: "Brazil: Wish You Were Here!". After shooting the video, will.i.am shot the video for "She's a Star" on a Brazilian beach, at night with special effects reminiscent of Duran Duran's "What Happens Tomorrow".

== Usage in media ==
"I Got It from My Mama" was featured in several television programs including CSI Miami and Gossip Girl. The hook of the song is sampled in PSY's song "Daddy".

== Track listing ==
- Promotional CD single
1. "I Got It from My Mama" (Radio edit)—3:58
2. "I Got It from My Mama" (LP version)—4:05
3. "I Got It from My Mama" (Instrumental)—4:05
- UK CD single
1. "I Got It from My Mama" (Radio edit)—3:43
2. "I Got It from My Mama" (Busta Rhymes remix)—4:12
- German CD single
1. "I Got It from My Mama" (LP version)—4:05
2. "I Got It from My Mama" (Busta Rhymes remix)—4:12
3. "I Got It from My Mama" (Instrumental)—4:05
4. "I Got It from My Mama" (Music video)—4:00
- Digital download
1. "I Got It from My Mama" (LP version)—4:05
- Digital single
1. "I Got It from My Mama" (Busta Rhymes remix)—4:12
- Digital video single
1. "I Got It from My Mama" (Radio edit)—3:58
2. "I Got It from My Mama" (Music video)—4:00

== Charts ==
=== Weekly charts ===
Chart (2007)	Peak position
Australia (ARIA)	19
Australian Urban (ARIA)	5
Austria (Ö3 Austria Top 40)	49
Belgium (Ultratop 50 Flanders)	46
Belgium (Ultratip Bubbling Under Wallonia)	4
Canada Hot 100 (Billboard)	18
Canada CHR/Top 40 (Billboard)	12
CIS Airplay (TopHit)	58
Czech Republic Airplay (ČNS IFPI)	21
Finland (Suomen virallinen lista)	6
France (SNEP)	49
Germany (GfK)	33
Italy (FIMI)	14
Mexico Anglo (Monitor Latino)	18
Netherlands (Dutch Top 40)	19
Netherlands (Single Top 100)	46
Romania (Romanian Top 100)	30
Russia Airplay (TopHit)	138
Scotland Singles (OCC)	31
Sweden (Sverigetopplistan)	18
Switzerland (Schweizer Hitparade)	77
Ukraine Airplay (TopHit)	93
UK Hip Hop/R&B (OCC)	8
UK Singles (OCC)	38
US Billboard Hot 100	31
US Hot R&B/Hip-Hop Songs (Billboard)	94
US Hot Rap Songs (Billboard)	23
US Pop Airplay (Billboard)	19
Venezuela Pop Rock (Record Report)	6

=== Year-end charts ===
Charts (2007)	Position
Australia (ARIA)	94
UK Urban (Music Week)	18

== Release history ==
Release dates and formats for "I Got It from My Mama"
Region	Date	Format	Label	Ref.
United States	July 31, 2007	Contemporary hit radio	will.i.am; Interscope	
United States	August 7, 2007	Digital download	will.i.am; Interscope	
United States	August 21, 2007	12"	will.i.am; Interscope	
Germany	September 21, 2007	CD single	Universal	
United Kingdom	September 24, 2007	CD single	Polydor	
