= One More Chance (will.i.am song) =

Single by will.i.am

from the album Songs About Girls
- B-side: "The Donque Song (Remix)"
- Released: October 2, 2007
- Recorded: 2006–2007
- Genre: Electro-R&B
- Length: 4:24 (album version); 3:51 (radio edit)
- Label: will.i.am; Interscope
- Songwriters: will.i.am; Fernando Garibay
- Producer: Fernando Garibay

Will.i.am singles chronology
"In the Ayer" (2008)	"One More Chance" (2007)	"What's Your Name" (2008)

"One More Chance" is a song by American rapper will.i.am, released by Interscope Records on October 7, 2007 as the second single from his third solo album, Songs About Girls (2007).

== Background ==
It was slated to be the second single, but its release was cancelled in favor of "Heartbreaker". Initially, the song was released via airplay on many European radio stations in October 2007, and was subsequently released to US radio. The song was co-written by Fernando Garibay, and was released in the UK on 25 August 2008. It was believed that Nicole Scherzinger was originally due to feature on the track, as in the first verse, will.i.am raps "You want a good nigga to stickwitu", in reference to the Pussycat Dolls song "Stickwitu". The music video for "One More Chance" premiered on Bubble Hits on 31 July 2008. It features will.i.am walking through a town manipulating the scenery around him with his hands to win his ex's favour and give him "one more chance". On August 31, 2008, the song entered the UK Singles Chart at #97.

== Track listing ==
- Promotional CD single
1. "One More Chance" (Radio Edit) - 3:53
2. "One More Chance" (Dave Audé Remix) - 7:27
3. "One More Chance" (Instrumental) - 4:24
- UK CD single / Digital download
1. "One More Chance" (Album Version) - 4:24
2. "The Donque Song" (Fedde Le Grand Pinkbird Dub Remix) - 5:43

== Charts ==
=== Weekly charts ===
Chart (2008)	Peak position
Scotland Singles (OCC)	39
UK Singles (OCC)	97
UK Hip Hop/R&B (OCC)	7

=== Year-end charts ===
Chart (2008)	Position
UK Urban (Music Week)	20

== Release history ==
Release dates and formats for "One More Chance"
Region	Date	Format	Label	Ref.
United States	October 2, 2007	Contemporary hit radio; rhythmic contemporary radio	will.i.am; Interscope	
United Kingdom	August 25, 2008	CD single	Polydor	
