= Must B 21 =

Must B 21 (Soundtrack to Get Things Started)

Studio album by will.i.am
- Released: September 23, 2003
- Recorded: April 2002 – July 2003
- Genre: Hip-hop
- Length: 48:28
- Labels: will.i.am; BBE
- Producers: will.i.am; Printz Board

Will.i.am chronology
Lost Change (2001)	Must B 21 (Soundtrack to Get Things Started) (2003)	Songs About Girls (2007)

Singles from Must B 21
- 1. "Take It" Released: January 20, 2004

Professional ratings
Review scores
Source	Rating
Now	4/5 Ns
RapReviews	8.5/10

Must B 21 (Soundtrack to Get Things Started) is the second solo studio album by American musician will.i.am. It was released on September 23, 2003, via will.i.am Music Group and Barely Breaking Even. Produced by will.i.am himself together with Printz Board, it features guest appearances from Supernatural, Dante Santiago, Flii, John Legend, Planet Asia, Krondon, KRS-One, MC Lyte, Niu, Phife Dawg, Phil Da Agony, Tash and Triple 7, as well as his Black Eyed Peas groupmates Fergie and Taboo.

== Background ==
The album itself is a collection of material recorded by Adams during the creation of the Black Eyed Peas album Elephunk. The project marked Adams' last release as a solo artist for over four years, until his third album Songs About Girls was released in late 2007. The album was originally only available on vinyl, but a CD and digital release followed in December 2003. Track seventeen on the release, "Go!", was used in the video games NBA Live 2005 and Madden NFL 2005. A video for the track was also recorded for use within the games; however, no official singles were released from the album. The artwork for the album was designed by Shepard Fairey.

== Track listing ==
No.	Title	Writer(s)	Producer(s)	Length
1.	"Take It" (featuring KRS-One)	William Adams; Lawrence Parker	will.i.am	2:48
2.	"Nah Mean" (featuring Phife Dawg)	Adams; Malik Taylor	will.i.am	3:48
3.	"B Boyz" (featuring MC Supernatural)	Adams; Reco Price	will.i.am	2:56
4.	"Here to Party" (featuring FLII, Planet Asia and Krondon)	Adams; Anwar Burton; Jason Green; Marvin Jones	will.i.am	3:11
5.	"Bomb Bomb" (Interlude)			0:23
6.	"Bomb Bomb" (featuring MC Supernatural)	Adams; Price	will.i.am	3:24
7.	"Swing by My Way" (featuring John Legend)	Adams; John Stephens; George Pajon Jr.	will.i.am	3:49
8.	"It's OK" (featuring Triple Seven and Dante Santiago)	Adams; Michael Gardener; Dante Santiago	will.i.am	3:38
9.	"Mash Out" (Interlude)			0:27
10.	"Mash Out" (featuring MC Lyte and Fergie)	Adams; Lana Moorer; Stacy Ferguson	will.i.am	3:09
11.	"Ride Ride" (featuring John Legend)	Prince Board	Printz Board	3:16
12.	"Sumthin' Special" (featuring NIU, Dante Santiago and Taboo)	Adams; Kejon Daniels; Santiago; Jaime Gomez	will.i.am	3:54
13.	"Sumthin' Special" (Interlude)			0:49
14.	"I'm Ready (Y'All Ain't Ready for This)" (featuring Phil Da Agony, Tash and MC Supernatural)	Adams; Jason Smith; Rico Smith; Price	will.i.am	3:40
15.	"We Got Chu" (featuring Planet Asia and FLII)	Adams; Green; Burton; Pajon Jr.; Board	will.i.am	3:52
16.	"Go!" (Interlude)			1:31
17.	"Go!"	Adams	will.i.am	3:53
Total length:				48:28
