= Lost Change =

Studio album by will.i.am
- Released: September 1, 2001
- Recorded: July 2000 – August 2001
- Genres: Alternative hip hop; jazz rap; neo soul
- Length: 52:32
- Labels: will.i.am; Atlantic; BBE
- Producers: will.i.am; Printz Board; Michael Angelo Batio; Dylan "3D" Dresdow

Will.i.am chronology
Lost Change (2001)	Must B 21 (2003)

Singles from Lost Change
- 1. "I Am" Released: 2001

Professional ratings
Review scores
Source	Rating
AllMusic	4/5 stars
The Province	3/5 stars

Lost Change is the debut studio album by American musician will.i.am, released on September 1, 2001 by Atlantic Records.

== Singles ==
The album was supported by the release single "I Am".

== Critical reception ==
Curt Fields of the Washington Post called Lost Change "a fun, sonic grab bag."

Matt Conaway of AllMusic also praised the album, saying, "will.i.am's Lost Change is a solid extension of the [beat-suite] movement, cozily nestling between Jay Dee's "Welcome to Detroit", a more rhyme-orientated opus, and Pete Rock's Petestrumentals [...] A sophisticated and musically enthralling endeavor that still manages to be accessible, Lost Change does an admirable job of implementing a host of different styles, without losing the listener in the process."

== Track listing ==
No.	Title	Writer(s)	Producer(s)	Length
1.	"Ev Rebahdee" (featuring Planet Asia)	William Adams, Jason Green, Johnny Curtis	will.i.am	4:26
2.	"Lay Me Down" (featuring Terry Dexter)	Adams, Terry Dexter, Curtis, Koliyah White, Printz Board	will.i.am, Printz Board	4:09
3.	"Possessions (Interlude)"	Adams, George Pajon, Jr., Michael Batio	will.i.am, Batio	1:18
4.	"Thai Arrive"	Adams, Pajon, Jr., Batio	will.i.am, Batio	2:02
5.	"If You Didn't Know" (featuring Mike Myers)	Adams, Pajon, Jr., Mike Myers, Tim Orindgreff, Printz Board	will.i.am, Printz Board	3:48
6.	"Money" (featuring The Horn Dogs, Huck Fynn and Oezlem)	Adams, George Pajon Jr., Batio, Orindgreff, Quincy McCrary, Printz Board	will.i.am, Printz Board, Batio	4:09
7.	"Lost Change"	Adams, Pajon, Jr., Batio, Orindgreff, Terrence Graves, Chuck Prada, Printz Board	will.i.am, Printz Board, Batio	2:24
8.	"I Am"	Adams, White	will.i.am	5:15
9.	"Hooda Hella You" (featuring Medusa)	Adams, Pajon, Jr., Batio	will.i.am, Batio	2:41
10.	"Lost Change in E Minor"	Adams, Pajon, Jr., Batio, Prada	will.i.am, Batio	2:41
11.	"Yadda Yadda"	Adams, Pajon, Jr., Batio, Dawn Beckman, Stephany Alexander	will.i.am, Batio	3:44
12.	"Em a Double Dee" (featuring Madd Dogg)	Adams, Curtis, Madd Dogg	will.i.am	4:35
13.	"Control Tower"	Adams, Pajon, Jr., Batio, Printz Board	will.i.am, Printz Board, Batio	3:15
14.	"Lost Change in D Minor"	Adams, Pajon, Jr., Batio, Prada	will.i.am, Batio	2:38

American bonus track
No.	Title	Writer(s)	Producer(s)	Length
11.	"Worriors" (featuring Burning Star)	Adams, Pajon, Jr., Batio	will.i.am, Batio	4:54

10th anniversary edition bonus instrumentals disc
No.	Title	Writer(s)	Producer(s)	Length
1.	"Ev Rebahdee" (featuring Planet Asia)	Adams, Green, Curtis	will.i.am	4:26
2.	"Lay Me Down" (featuring Terry Dexter)	Adams, Dexter, Curtis, White, Printz Board	will.i.am, Printz Board	4:09
3.	"Possessions" (Interlude)	Adams, Pajon, Jr., Batio	will.i.am, Batio	1:18
4.	"Thai Arrive"	Adams, Pajon, Jr., Batio	will.i.am, Batio	2:02
5.	"If You Didn't Know" (featuring Mike Myers)	Adams, Pajon, Jr., Myers, Orindgreff, Printz Board	will.i.am, Printz Board	3:48
6.	"Money" (featuring The Horn Dogs, Huck Fynn and Oezlem)	Adams, Pajon, Jr., Batio, Orindgreff, McCrary, Printz Board	will.i.am, Printz Board, Batio	4:09
7.	"Lost Change"	Adams, Pajon, Jr., Batio, Orindgreff, Graves, Prada, Printz Board	will.i.am, Printz Board, Batio	2:24
8.	"I Am"	Adams, White	will.i.am	5:15
9.	"Hooda Hella You" (featuring Medusa)	Adams, Pajon, Jr., Batio	will.i.am, Batio	2:41
10.	"Lost Change in E Minor"	Adams, Pajon, Jr., Batio, Prada	will.i.am, Batio	2:41
11.	"Yadda Yadda"	Adams, Pajon, Jr., Batio, Beckman, Alexander	will.i.am, Batio	3:44
12.	"Em A Double Dee" (featuring Madd Dogg)	Adams, Curtis, Madd Dogg	will.i.am	4:35
13.	"Control Tower"	Adams, Pajon, Jr., Batio, Printz Board	will.i.am, Printz Board, Batio	3:15
14.	"Lost Change in D Minor"	Adams, Pajon, Jr., Batio, Prada	will.i.am, Batio	2:38
