= A Dream (Common song) =

Single by Common featuring will.i.am

from the album Freedom Writers (soundtrack)
- Released: 2006
- Genre: Hip hop
- Label: Hollywood Records
- Songwriter(s): Lonnie Lynn; William Adams; Martin Luther King Jr.
- Producer(s): will.i.am

Common singles chronology
"Faithful" (2005)	"A Dream" (2006)	"The People" (2007)

will.i.am singles chronology
"Hip Hop Is Dead" (2006)	"A Dream" (2006)	"I Got It from My Mama" (2007)

"A Dream" is a song by American rapper Common, released in 2006 as a single the film Freedom Writers's accompanying soundtrack. It is produced by fellow rapper will.i.am, who also performs the song's chorus. The song's hook samples Martin Luther King Jr.'s historical "I Have a Dream" speech, which relate to both the lyrics and the accompanying film. The single release of "A Dream" includes two will.i.am tracks, "Colors" and "Bus Ride."

== Music video ==
The video for the single contains images from the movie (many of which feature Hilary Swank, its lead actress), mixed with animated series with will.i.am singing on a platform and Common rapping in corridor and bedrooms before stylized images of the Civil Rights Movement. Television footage of the "I Have a Dream" speech is exposed on guide throughout the video. The imagery is destined to increase the song's messages of determination in the face of discrimination, and hope for a racially equal world.

== Track listing ==
1. "A Dream"
2. "Colors"
3. "Bus Ride"

== Chart positions ==
Chart (2006)	Peak position
U.S. Billboard Bubbling Under R&B/Hip-Hop Singles	16

== See also ==
- List of Common songs
- Civil rights movement in popular culture
