= Songs About Girls =

Studio album by will.i.am
- Released: September 19, 2007
- Recorded: 2006–2007
- Genres: Hip-hop; electronic; R&B
- Length: 60:00
- Labels: will.i.am; Interscope
- Producers: will.i.am; Polow da Don; Fernando Garibay; Lil Jon; LRoc; Paper-Boy; Klasic

Will.i.am chronology
Must B 21 (2003)	Songs About Girls (2007)	#willpower (2013)

Singles from Songs About Girls
- 1. "I Got It from My Mama" Released: July 31, 2007; 2. "One More Chance" Released: October 2, 2007; 3. "Heartbreaker" Released: November 1, 2007

Professional ratings
Review scores
Source	Rating
AllMusic	4/5 stars
BBC	(unfavorable)
Entertainment Weekly	(C−)
Rolling Stone	3.5/5 stars
Slant	3/5 stars
Philadelphia Inquirer	3/5 stars
Los Angeles Times	2.5/5 stars
Atlanta Journal Constitution	(A−)

Songs About Girls is the third studio album by American musician will.i.am. The original title of the album was Keep the Beeper. The album was released on September 19, 2007. The first single released from the album was a club track titled "I Got It from My Mama" which debuted on the Billboard Hot 100 at #93 on August 17, 2007. will.i.am enlisted guest appearances from Cheryl and Snoop Dogg. The album was recorded by Pardraic Kerin and will.i.am, and mixed by Dylan Dresdow.

== Background ==
The album has been described by will.i.am as semi-autobiographical conceptual album "where all the songs could tell a story of falling in love, falling out of love, trying to get back in love, destructing love and destroying love and then starting a new situation. That journey is what makes this unique." The album is partially based on a seven-year relationship that will.i.am experienced and the infidelities and the break-up of that relationship. According to will.i.am's video on MySpace TV, he considers Songs About Girls to be his debut album, with his first two being production compilations.

== Critical reception ==
Caryn Ganz of Rolling Stone remarked "Though Snoop Dogg makes a cameo and Will breaks into more than a few nimble rhymes, Songs About Girls isn't a hip-hop record, but a pop R&B album of mellow head-nodders that veer between chilled-out soul and lite-electro funk." While Tom Jones of the BBC called Songs About Girls a "soulless record", which "wore thin very quickly" and is "far too long." John Bush of Allmusic praised the album saying, "Boasting the best album-length production of the year, will.i.am's Songs About Girls is a tour de force of next-generation contemporary R&B...Recorded everywhere from Rio to The Record Plant, Songs About Girls percolates with more innovation, enthusiasm, and excitement than contemporary work by Pharrell, Kanye West, Mark Ronson, or anyone else remotely in the same league."

== Collaborations ==
will.i.am revealed on the Canadian MTV e2 show that the album would feature collaborations with: Slick Rick, Ice Cube, Q-Tip, Common, Snoop Dogg, Too Short, Busta Rhymes and Ludacris. Unfortunately, the only collaboration that made the final cut is the Snoop Dogg collaboration. Kat Graham sings in "I Got It from My Mama", "One More Chance" and "The Donque Song" but she is not credited. will.i.am also recorded a song with American R&B singer Justin Timberlake on a song called: "Going Crazy" - though never made the final album cut.

The 2008 song American Boy by Estelle uses the instrumental from "Impatient" and was also produced by will.i.am.

== Album release ==
In September 2006, will.i.am became the head of marketing of the online music distribution company Musicane. Musicane allows artists to directly sell their songs to the public without a record company overseeing the distribution of the album. will.i.am has stated that he intends for Songs About Girls to be an infinitely expandable collection of songs that are distributed through Musicane and other online music services. According to will.i.am; "If I have an album filled with songs about girls, what happens if tomorrow I write another song about a girl?", he explains. "So something that started off just with 15 songs, in the next ten years could have 100 songs. Having 12 songs on a record? That day is done".

Despite Will's success with The Black Eyed Peas and as a producer for numerous other artists, the album was not a commercial success. It debuted at #38 on the Billboard 200 with sales of just 21,000 copies according to Nielsen SoundScan. This was significantly less than The Black Eyed Peas' Elephunk (#14) and Monkey Business (#2) and also Fergie's solo effort The Dutchess (#2). The album leaked to the Internet on September 19, 2007. The album debuted on the Australian ARIA Albums Chart on October 1, 2007 at number 58 with sales of 870 copies. The album was released on Argentina on October 5, 2007. The album went Gold in Poland three days before its release. "Dynamite Interlude" has no writing or production credits.

== Track listing ==
All songs produced by will.i.am, except where noted.

No.	Title	Writer(s)	Producer(s)	Length
1.	"Over"	William Adams, Jeffrey Lynne		4:00
2.	"Heartbreaker"	Adams		5:27
3.	"I Got It from My Mama"	Adams, Jean-Luc Drion, Dominique Régiacorte		4:01
4.	"She's a Star"	Adams, Jamal Jones	Polow da Don	3:47
5.	"Get Your Money"	Adams, Patrick Bodmer, Booka Shade, Philipp Jung		5:24
6.	"The Donque Song" (featuring Snoop Dogg)	Adams, Fernando Garibay, Calvin Broadus	will.i.am, Garibay	4:29
7.	"Impatient" (featuring Dante Santiago)	Adams, Keith Harris, Josh Lopez, Caleb Speir		4:17
8.	"One More Chance"	Adams, Fernando Garibay	will.i.am, Garibay	4:24
9.	"Invisible"	Adams, George Pajon Jr., Mike McHenry, Jean Baptiste, Joshua Klasic Singleton for The Bullets Production Team, Speir	will.i.am, Paper Boy	3:56
10.	"Fantastic"	Adams, Berry Gordy, Alphonso Mizell, Fredrick Perren, Deke Richards		3:25
11.	"Fly Girl"	Adams, George Pajon Jr., Keith Harris	will.i.am	4:46
12.	"Dynamite" (Interlude)	Adams		1:19
13.	"Ain't It Pretty"	Adams, Jamal Jones	will.i.am, Polow da Don	4:35
14.	"Make It Funky"	Adams		3:59
15.	"S.O.S. (Mother Nature)"	Adams, Paul Simon, Phil Ramone		4:17

International bonus track
No.	Title	Writer(s)	Length
16.	"Spending Money"	Adams	3:57

UK bonus track
No.	Title	Writer(s)	Length
17.	"Mamma Mia"	Adams, Ray Charles	3:39

Japanese & iTunes Store bonus track version bonus track
No.	Title	Writer(s)	Length
18.	"Damn Damn Damn"	Adams, L.A. Jefferson, Craig Love, Jonathan Smith	4:28

Samples credits

- "Over" samples "It's Over" by Electric Light Orchestra and it samples a break from T-Ski Valley's 1981 rap classic "Catch the Beat".
- "Get Your Money" samples "Body Language" by M.A.N.D.Y. and Booka Shade
- "Impatient" samples "Love Foolosophy" by Jamiroquai
- "Fantastic" samples the guitar hook played by David T. Walker in "I Want You Back" by the Jackson 5
- "S.O.S. (Mother Nature)" samples Steve Gadd's drumming in "50 Ways to Leave Your Lover" by Paul Simon
- "Mamma Mia" samples "What'd I Say" by Ray Charles

== Charts ==
Chart performance for Songs About Girls
Chart (2007–2008)	Peak position
Australian Albums (ARIA)	58
Australian Urban Albums (ARIA)	10
Canadian Albums (Nielsen SoundScan)	33
French Albums (SNEP)	89
Greek Albums (IFPI)	23
Japanese Albums (Oricon)	8
Swiss Albums (Schweizer Hitparade)	27
UK Albums (Official Charts)	68
UK R&B Albums (Official Charts)	12
US Billboard 200	38
US Top R&B/Hip-Hop Albums (Billboard)	14
US Top Rap Albums (Billboard)	9

== Certifications ==
Certifications for Songs About Girls
Region	Certification	Certified units/sales
Japan (RIAJ)	Gold	100,000^{^}
Poland (ZPAV)	Gold	10,000^{*}
Russia (NFPF)	Gold	10,000^{*}
^{*} Sales figures based on certification alone.^{^} Shipments figures based on certification alone.

== Release history ==
Release dates and formats for Songs About Girls
Region	Date	Format	Label	Ref.
Japan	September 19, 2007	CD	Universal	
Germany	September 21, 2007	CD	Universal	
Canada	September 25, 2007	CD	Universal	
United States	September 25, 2007	CD	Interscope	
United States	October 2, 2007	LP	Interscope	
