= In the Ayer =

2008 single by Flo Rida

Single by Flo Rida featuring will.i.am

from the album Mail on Sunday
- Released: May 20, 2008
- Recorded: 2007
- Genre: Hip hop; R&B
- Length: 3:40
- Label: Atlantic; Poe Boy
- Songwriters: Tramar Dillard; William Adams; Tony Butler
- Producer: will.i.am

Flo Rida singles chronology
"Move Shake Drop" (2008)	"In the Ayer" (2008)	"Running Back" (2008)

will.i.am singles chronology
"Heartbreaker" (2008)	"In the Ayer" (2008)	"One More Chance" (2008)

"In the Ayer" is the third single from rapper Flo Rida's debut album Mail on Sunday. It was produced by and features will.i.am. Tiffany Villarreal performs background vocals on the song. It interpolates the 1984 song "Jam the Box" by Pretty Tony.

The song has been certified platinum by the RIAA, making it Flo Rida's second song to do so.

The official remix features Rick Ross, Brisco and Billy Blue with original chorus by will.i.am and new Flo Rida verses.

From 2009 to 2012, this was the victory song for the Baltimore Orioles at home.

It was used as an appearance song for Lee Jong-wook, who played for the Doosan Bears and NC Dinos.

== Background ==
A year before the song was released, will.i.am was at Los Angeles's KIIS FM (102.7) doing a freestyle for Jojo Wright over the instrumental of "Easy" by Paula DeAnda. He described the freestyle as a "hot hook". The beat production was done by Timbaland with the help of DJ Tweak from Lakeland, FL.

== Music video ==
The video premiered on FNMTV on Friday June 13, 2008. A clip of video was showcased by Pete Wentz of Fall Out Boy in an MTV commercial announcing their new music video blocks. Video appearances made are Rick Ross and Brisco.

== Chart performance ==
In the U.S., "In the Ayer" debuted at No. 38 on the Billboard Hot 100. The song would eventually become Flo Rida's third top twenty and second top ten hit on the Billboard Hot 100, peaking at No. 9. It has also been a hit on pop, reaching No. 14 on the Pop 100, and No. 12 on Mainstream Top 40 radio. It peaked at No. 9 on the New Zealand RIANZ chart, making it Flo Rida's third consecutive top ten hit there. It debuted at No. 23 on the Australian ARIA charts, later peaking at number 19. On the Canadian Hot 100 it peaked at No. 13, giving Flo Rida his third top twenty there.

On September 7, 2008, the song entered the UK Singles Chart at No. 46 on downloads alone and peaked at No. 29.

== Charts and certifications ==
=== Weekly charts ===
Chart (2008)	Peak position
Australia (ARIA)	19
Bulgaria (BAMP)	3
Canada Hot 100 (Billboard)	13
Canada CHR/Top 40 (Billboard)	15
European Hot 100 Singles (Billboard)	72
Germany (GfK)	50
Ireland (IRMA)	13
New Zealand (Recorded Music NZ)	9
Sweden (Sverigetopplistan)	20
UK Singles (OCC)	29
US Billboard Hot 100	9
US Hot Rap Songs (Billboard)	16
US Pop Airplay (Billboard)	12
US Rhythmic Airplay (Billboard)	13

=== Year-end charts ===
Chart (2008)	Position
Australia (ARIA)	84
Canada (Canadian Hot 100)	74
UK Urban (Music Week)	17
US Billboard Hot 100	59

=== Certifications ===
Region	Certification	Certified units/sales
Canada (Music Canada)	Platinum	80,000^{*}
United States (RIAA)	2× Platinum	2,000,000^{*}
^{*} Sales figures based on certification alone.

== Release history ==
Release dates and formats for "In the Ayer"
Region	Date	Format	Label(s)	Ref.
United States	June 3, 2008	Mainstream airplay	Atlantic	
