= Féfé =

French-Nigerian singer and rapper

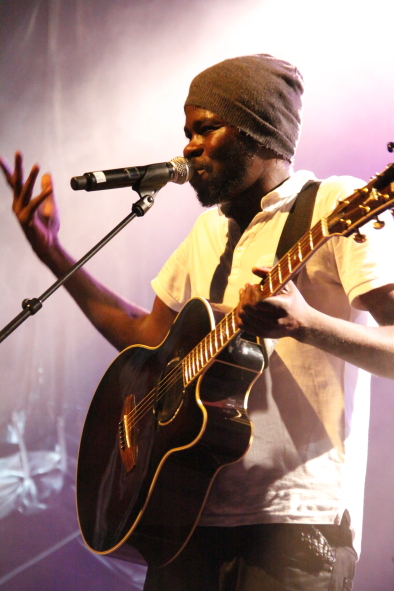

Background information
- Also known as: PHNX, Féniksi, Fe²
- Born: Samuël Adebiyi; 18 January 1976 (age 50); Clichy, Hauts-de-Seine, France
- Origin: Yoruba
- Genres: Hip-hop, pop
- Occupations: Singer, songwriter, rapper
- Years active: 1996 – present
- Website: fe2.fr

Samuël Adebiyi, better known by his stage name Féfé (formerly Féniksi), is a Nigerian singer and rapper.

== Early life and career ==
Féfé was born in Clichy, Hauts-de-Seine, France on 18 January 1976 to Yoruba parents from Nigeria. He formed the rap group OFX with KLR in 1996 where Adebiyi was known as PHNX (also read as Féniksi). The two released the maxi Je n'ose y croire, after which a third member, Vicelow, joined in. The trio made a number of appearances on various compilations and mixtapes. KLR died in April 1998.

OFX, including Féniksi, became part of a bigger formation, the hip-hop collective Saïan Supa Crew, that besides OFX, included two other formations, Explicit Samouraï and Simple Spirit. After KLR's death, Saïan Supa Crew released an album titled KLR in his memory in 1999. In 2002, OFX released the maxi OVNI 2. It was followed by another OFX album, Roots in 2003. In its turn, Saïan Supa Crew would release X-Raisons in 2001 and Hold-Up in 2005.

OFX eventually faded and is no longer active. Its remaining member Féfé has continued his career with solo releases like Jeune à la retraite released on Polydor on 12 October 2009, and on 20 May 2013, his second solo album Le charme des premiers jours again on Polydor.

== In popular culture ==
He co-wrote "Le malade imaginaire", a main song in the soundtrack of the 2002 film The Truth About Charlie, in addition to co-writing the track "Intro".

In 2010, he sang the French version of "Wavin' Flag", the Coca-Cola-sponsored 2010 World Cup song. Féfé sang the French lyrics with the songwriter, the Somalian-Canadian K'naan performing the English lyrics. The Féfé version credit to "K'naan featuring Féfé" reached number 2 on SNEP, the official French Singles Chart. In 2011, he performed with Aṣa in Sydney.

== Discography ==
=== Albums, maxis, mixtapes ===
as part of OFX

- 1999: Je n'ose y croire
- 2002; OVNI 2
- 2003: Roots

as part of collective Saïan Supa Crew

- 1997: Saïan Supa Land (EP)
- 1998: Saïan Supa Crew (EP)
- 1999: KLR (album)
- 2000: L'Block presente (EP)
- 2001: X-Raisons (album)
- 2002: Da Stand Out (Ep)
- 2005: Hold-Up (album)
- 2006: Hold Up Tour – Live in Paris (live album)

solo albums

Year	Album	Peak positions	Certification
Year	Album	FR	Certification
2009	Jeune à la retraite	17	
2013	Le charme des premiers jours	77	
2017	Mauve	79	

=== Singles ===
Featured in

Year	Single	Peak positions
Year	Single	FR
2010	"Wavin' Flag (Remix)" (K'naan feat. Féfé)	2
2013	"Blink Blink" (Seeed feat. Féfé)	-
