= The E.N.D. World Tour =

2009–10 concert tour by Black Eyed Peas

- World tour by Black Eyed Peas
- Promotional poster for the tour
- Location: Asia • Oceania • North America • South America • Europe
- Associated album: The E.N.D.
- Start date: September 15, 2009
- End date: November 13, 2010
- Legs: 5
- No. of shows: 113

Black Eyed Peas concert chronology
- Black Blue & You Tour (2007); The E.N.D. World Tour (2009–2010); The Beginning Massive Stadium Tour (2011)

The E.N.D. World Tour was the third concert tour by American hip hop group Black Eyed Peas, in support of their fifth studio album The E.N.D. (2009). The tour began in Japan on September 15, 2009, with shows also performed in Australia and New Zealand in 2009. The group toured in North America starting in February 2010, with dates also planned for Europe starting in Dublin, Ireland in May. The group performed 2 shows in Paradise, Nevada at the end of 2009 as a warm up to their extensive North American tour. The tour was also expected to reach South America and more parts of Asia during 2010. It is the group's biggest tour production-wise to date, with the group's female vocalist Fergie stating that they are "trying to up [their] game" and the shows will "utilize a lot of the technology that's out there". The E.N.D. World Tour was backed by presenting sponsor BlackBerry, and Bacardi as the official spirit of the tour.

== Personnel ==
THE BLACK EYED PEAS

- Will.i.am
- Apl.de.ap
- Taboo
- Fergie

BAND (BUCKY JONSON)

- Printz Board – keyboards, trumpet, and bass
- George Pajon – lead guitars
- Tim Izo – rhythm guitars, sax, flute, clarinet, MPC, keyboards
- Keith Harris – drums, percussion, keyboards

SPECIAL GUESTS

- Slash (musician) - guitars on, "Fergie and Slash Solo"
- Ludacris - vocals on, "Glamorous"

PERFORMER

- Dante Santiago - vocals

DJ

- DJ POETNAMELIFE – DJ
- DJ Ammo – DJ

DANCERS

- Brandee Stephens
- Nicole "Nikki" Delecia
- Julianne Waters
- Nina Kripas
- Marilyn Ortiz
- Jessica Castro

== Opening acts ==
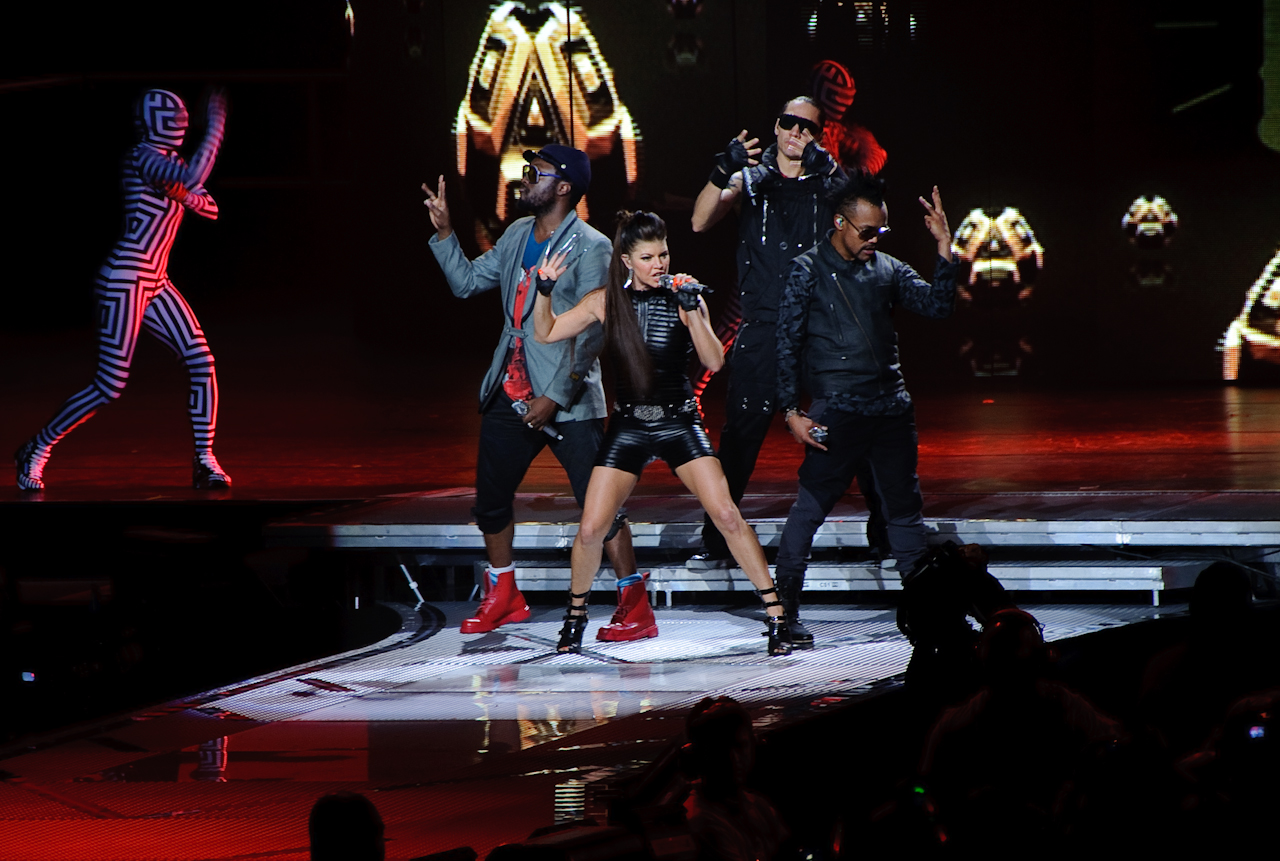
The Black Eyed Peas performing on October 7, 2009

- LMFAO (Oceania and North America)
- Ludacris (North America)
- David Guetta (Barcelona, Washington, D.C., New York City, Guadalajara, Mexico City & São Paulo)
- Prototype (selected North America Dates)
- Cheryl Cole (Europe)
- Jason Derülo (Canada Dates)
- B.o.B (selected North America Dates)
- T-Pain (selected North America Dates)
- K'naan (Quebec City)
- Down with Webster (Sarnia)
- Faithless (Athens)
- Timbalada (Salvador)
- Toni Garrido (Rio de Janeiro)
- Tomate (Belo Horizonte)
- Yolanda Be Cool (Argentina)
- Movimiento Original (Chile)
- DJ Leandro (Peru)

== Set list ==
Japanese-Oceanian Leg
1. "Mr. Boom (Video Introduction)
2. "Let's Get It Started"
3. "Rock That Body"
4. "Meet Me Halfway"
5. "Alive" + "Don't Phunk with My Heart"
6. "Shut Up"
7. "Imma Be"
8. "My Humps"
9. "Missing You"
10. "Bebot" / "Mare" (apl.de.ap solo)
11. "Rockin’ To The Beat" (Taboo solo)
12. "Fergalicious"/ "Glamorous" / "Big Girls Don't Cry" (Fergie solo)
13. "In the Ayer" / "OMG" / "Put Your Hands Up 4 Detroit" / "American Boy" / "Don't Stop 'Til You Get Enough" / "Don't Stop the Music" / "Wanna Be Startin' Somethin'" / "White Lines (Don't Don't Do It)" / "Thriller" / "Jump Around"/"Otherside" / "Smells Like Teen Spirit" (will.i.am DJ set)
14. "Now Generation"
15. "Pump It"
16. "Where Is the Love?"
17. "Boom Boom Pow"

Encore

19. "Showdown" / " Party All The Time" / "Out Of My Head"
20. "I Gotta Feeling"
First Northern American Leg
1. "Mr. Boom (Video Introduction)
2. "Let's Get It Started"
3. "Rock That Body"
4. "Meet Me Halfway"
5. "Alive" + "Don't Phunk with My Heart"
6. "Imma Be"
7. "My Humps"
8. "Missing You"
9. "Bebot" / "Mare" (apl.de.ap solo)
10. "Rockin’ To The Beat" (Taboo solo)
11. "Fergalicious" / "Glamorous" / "Big Girls Don't Cry" (Fergie solo)
12. "In the Ayer" / "OMG" / "Put Your Hands Up 4 Detroit" / "American Boy" / "Don't Stop 'Til You Get Enough" / "Don't Stop the Music" / "Wanna Be Startin' Somethin'" / "White Lines (Don't Don't Do It)" / "Thriller" / "Jump Around" / "Otherside" / "Smells Like Teen Spirit" / "Don't Stop Believin'" / "Right Round" (will.i.am DJ set)
13. "Now Generation"
14. "Pump It"
15. "Where Is the Love?"

Encore

16. "Party All the Time" / "Showdown" (Video Interlude)
17. "Party All the Time" / "Showdown" / "Out Of My Head" (only performed in Atlanta and Las Vegas Night 1 and 2)
18. "Boom Boom Pow"
19. "I Gotta Feeling"
European + Second Northern American Leg
1. "Mr. Boom (Video Introduction)
2. "Let's Get It Started"
3. "Rock That Body"
4. "Meet Me Halfway"
5. "Alive" + "Don't Phunk with My Heart"
6. "Imma Be"
7. "My Humps"
8. "Missing You"
9. "Bebot" / "Mare" (apl.de.ap solo)
10. "Rockin’ To The Beat" (Taboo solo)
11. "Fergalicious" / "Glamorous" / "Big Girls Don't Cry" (Fergie solo)
12. "In the Ayer" / "OMG" / "Put Your Hands Up 4 Detroit" / "American Boy" / "Don't Stop 'Til You Get Enough" / "Don't Stop the Music" / "Wanna Be Startin' Somethin'" / "White Lines (Don't Don't Do It)" / "Thriller" / "Jump Around" / "Otherside" / "Smells Like Teen Spirit" / "Heartbreaker" (will.i.am DJ set)
13. "Don't Lie"
14. "Shut Up"
15. "Pump It"
16. "Where Is the Love?"

Encore

17. "Party All the Time" / "Showdown" (Video Interlude)
18. "Boom Boom Pow"
19. "I Gotta Feeling"
South America
1. "Mr. Boom (Video Introduction)
2. "Let's Get It Started"
3. "Rock That Body"
4. "Meet Me Halfway"
5. "Alive"
6. "Don't Phunk with My Heart"
7. "Imma Be"
8. "My Humps"
9. "Hey Mama"
10. "Mas Que Nada"
11. "Missing You"
12. "Bebot" / "Mare" (apl.de.ap solo)
13. "Rockin’ To The Beat" (Taboo solo) + "La Paga"
14. "Fergalicious" / "Glamorous" / "Gettin' Over You" / "Big Girls Don't Cry" (Fergie solo)
15. "In the Ayer" / "OMG" / "Put Your Hands Up 4 Detroit" / "American Boy" / "Don't Stop 'Til You Get Enough" / "Don't Stop the Music" / "Wanna Be Startin' Somethin'" / "White Lines (Don't Don't Do It)" / "Thriller" / "Jump Around" / "Otherside" / "Smells Like Teen Spirit" / "Sweet Child O'Mine" / "Song 2" / "Sweet Dreams (Are Made of This)" / "The Time (Dirty Bit)" (will.i.am DJ set)
16. "Don't Lie"
17. "Shut Up"
18. "Pump It"
19. "Where Is the Love?"

Encore

20. "Party All the Time" / "Showdown" (Video Interlude)
21. "Boom Boom Pow"
22. "I Gotta Feeling"

== Shows ==
List of concerts
Date	City	Country	Venue	Attendance	Revenue
Asia
September 15, 2009	Hamamatsu	Japan	Hamamatsu Arena	—N/a	—N/a
September 18, 2009	Nagoya	Japan	Nippon Gaishi Hall	—N/a	—N/a
September 19, 2009	Chiba City	Japan	Makuhari Messe	—N/a	—N/a
September 21, 2009	Osaka	Japan	Osaka-jō Hall	—N/a	—N/a
September 22, 2009	Kobe	Japan	World Memorial Hall	—N/a	—N/a
September 23, 2009	Saitama	Japan	Saitama Super Arena	—N/a	—N/a
Oceania
October 1, 2009	Brisbane	Australia	Brisbane Entertainment Centre	—N/a	—N/a
October 2, 2009	Sydney	Australia	Acer Arena	—N/a	—N/a
October 3, 2009	Sydney	Australia	Acer Arena	—N/a	—N/a
October 5, 2009	Adelaide	Australia	Adelaide Entertainment Centre	—N/a	—N/a
October 6, 2009	Melbourne	Australia	Rod Laver Arena	—N/a	—N/a
October 7, 2009	Melbourne	Australia	Rod Laver Arena	—N/a	—N/a
October 10, 2009	Perth	Australia	Burswood Dome	—N/a	—N/a
October 13, 2009	Auckland	New Zealand	Vector Arena	—N/a	—N/a
North America
December 29, 2009	Las Vegas	United States	Mandalay Bay Events Center	—	—
December 30, 2009	Las Vegas	United States	Mandalay Bay Events Center	—	—
February 4, 2010	Atlanta	United States	Philips Arena	11,921 / 11,921	$857,619
February 6, 2010	Miami	United States	American Airlines Arena	15,466 / 15,466	$1,035,318
February 9, 2010	Jacksonville	United States	Jacksonville Veterans Memorial Arena	11,590 / 11,590	$636,653
February 10, 2010	Tampa	United States	St. Pete Times Forum	—	—
February 12, 2010	Nashville	United States	Nashville Arena	10,737 / 10,737	$680,106
February 13, 2010	Birmingham	United States	BJCC Arena	9,891 / 9,890	$494,726
February 16, 2010	Columbus	United States	Schottenstein Center	12,565 / 12,565	$605,824
February 17, 2010	Lexington	United States	Rupp Arena	12,501 / 12,501	$652,155
February 19, 2010	Raleigh	United States	RBC Center	12,675 / 12,675	$786,751
February 20, 2010	Charlotte	United States	Time Warner Cable Arena	14,477 / 14,477	$784,820
February 22, 2010 (Note: The show on February 22, 2010, at the Hampton Coliseum in Hampton, was originally scheduled to take place on January 19, 2010.)	Hampton	United States	Hampton Coliseum	8,132 / 8,132	$380,997
February 23, 2010	Washington, D.C.	United States	Verizon Center	14,513 / 14,513	$993,568
February 24, 2010	New York City	United States	Madison Square Garden	45,595 / 45,595	$3,099,335
February 26, 2010	Boston	United States	TD Banknorth Garden	13,312 / 13,312	$912,823
February 27, 2010	Uncasville	United States	Mohegan Sun Resort and Casino	7,844 / 7,844	$577,590
March 1, 2010	Uniondale	United States	Nassau Coliseum	14,237 / 14,237	$960,511
March 3, 2010	Philadelphia	United States	Wachovia Center	13,280 / 13,280	$921,493
March 4, 2010	Pittsburgh	United States	Mellon Arena	11,255 / 11,255	$633,013
March 9, 2010	Auburn Hills	United States	The Palace of Auburn Hills	14,800 / 14,800	$793,560
March 11, 2010	Milwaukee	United States	Bradley Center	11,161 / 11,161	$636,771
March 13, 2010	Chicago	United States	United Center	17,106 / 17,106	$1,152,289
March 18, 2010 (Note: Part of the Houston Livestock Show and Rodeo.)	Houston	United States	Reliant Center	—	—
March 19, 2010	Dallas	United States	American Airlines Center	15,726 / 15,726	$952,087
March 20, 2010	Tulsa	United States	BOK Center	13,310 / 13,310	$832,529
March 22, 2010	Saint Paul	United States	Xcel Energy Center	13,020 / 13,020	$877,799
March 24, 2010	Kansas City	United States	Sprint Center	—	—
March 25, 2010	Des Moines	United States	Wells Fargo Arena	—	—
March 27, 2010	Denver	United States	Pepsi Center	—	—
March 29, 2010	Los Angeles	United States	Staples Center	—	—
March 30, 2010	Los Angeles	United States	Staples Center	—	—
March 31, 2010	Glendale	United States	Jobing.com Arena	—	—
April 2, 2010	San Jose	United States	HP Pavilion	—	—
April 3, 2010	San Diego	United States	San Diego Sports Arena	—	—
April 7, 2010	Sacramento	United States	ARCO Arena	—	—
April 10, 2010	Tacoma	United States	Tacoma Dome	—	—
April 11, 2010	Vancouver	Canada	GM Place	—	—
Europe
May 1, 2010	Dublin	Ireland	The O_{2}	25,724 / 25,724	$2,011,353
May 2, 2010	Dublin	Ireland	The O_{2}	25,724 / 25,724	$2,011,353
May 5, 2010	London	England	The O_{2} Arena	—	—
May 6, 2010	London	England	The O_{2} Arena	—	—
May 8, 2010	Birmingham	England	LG Arena	27,630 / 27,630 (Note: Representative of the shows on May 8 and June 1.)	$1,966,279
May 11, 2010	Zürich	Switzerland	Hallenstadion	13,693 / 13,693	$1,024,207
May 12, 2010	Milan	Italy	Mediolanum Forum	11,516 / 11,516	$687,744
May 15, 2010	Berlin	Germany	O_{2} World	13,126 / 13,126	$855,979
May 16, 2010	Prague	Czech Republic	O_{2} Arena	16,038 / 16,038	$927,957
May 19, 2010	Antwerp	Belgium	Sportpaleis	16,678 / 16,678	$905,901
May 20, 2010	Paris	France	Palais Omnisports de Paris-Bercy	49,739 / 49,739 (Note: Representative of the shows on May 20 and June 4 and 5.)	$3,053,046
May 23, 2010	Manchester	England	Manchester Evening News Arena	31,693 / 31,693	$2,232,186
May 24, 2010	Manchester	England	Manchester Evening News Arena	31,693 / 31,693	$2,232,186
May 27, 2010	London	England	The O_{2} Arena	—	—
May 28, 2010	London	England	The O_{2} Arena	—	—
May 30, 2010 (Note: This concert was a "Send off for Portuguese World Cup Team".)	Lisbon	Portugal	Estádio Nacional	—	—
June 1, 2010	Birmingham	England	LG Arena		
June 4, 2010	Paris	France	Palais Omnisports de Paris-Bercy		
June 5, 2010	Paris	France	Palais Omnisports de Paris-Bercy		
July 2, 2010 (Note: This concert was part of the Main Square Festival.)	Arras	France	Citadelle d'Arras	—	—
July 3, 2010 (Note: This concert was part of SOMUSIC 2010.)	Barcelona	Spain	Estadi Cornellà-El Prat	—	—
July 5, 2010 (Note: This concert was part of the Heineken Jammin Festival.)	Venice	Italy	Parco San Giuliano	—	—
July 7, 2010 (Note: This concert was part of the Rockwave Festival.)	Athens	Greece	Terra Vibe Park	—	—
July 9, 2010 (Note: This concert was part of the T in the Park festival.)	Balado	Scotland	Balado Airfield	—	—
July 10, 2010 (Note: This concert was part of the Oxegen festival.)	Punchestown	Ireland	Punchestown Racecourse	—	—
July 12, 2010 (Note: This concert was part of the TW Classic Festival.)	Werchter	Belgium	Werchter Festival Grounds	—	—
North America
July 16, 2010 (Note: This concert was a part of the Quebec City International Summer Fest.)	Quebec City	Canada	Plains of Abraham	—N/a	—N/a
July 18, 2010 (Note: This concert was a part of the Rogers Sarnia Bayfest.)	Sarnia	Canada	Centennial Park	—N/a	—N/a
July 24, 2010 (Note: This concert was a part of the Halifax Rocks 2010 Festival.)	Halifax	Canada	Halifax Common	—N/a	—N/a
July 27, 2010	Toronto	Canada	Air Canada Centre	—N/a	—N/a
July 28, 2010	Toronto	Canada	Air Canada Centre	—N/a	—N/a
July 30, 2010 (Note: This concert was part of the GMA Summer Concert Series.)	New York City	United States	Rumsey Playfield	—N/a	—N/a
July 31, 2010	Montreal	Canada	Bell Centre	—N/a	—N/a
August 1, 2010	Ottawa	Canada	Scotiabank Place	—N/a	—N/a
August 3, 2010	Boston	United States	TD Garden	—N/a	—N/a
August 4, 2010	Newark	United States	Prudential Center	—N/a	—N/a
August 6, 2010	Hartford	United States	XL Center	—N/a	—N/a
August 7, 2010	Atlantic City	United States	Boardwalk Hall	—N/a	—N/a
August 10, 2010	Baltimore	United States	1st Mariner Arena	—N/a	—N/a
August 11, 2010	Buffalo	United States	HSBC Arena	—N/a	—N/a
August 13, 2010	Rosemont	United States	Allstate Arena	—N/a	—N/a
August 14, 2010	St. Louis	United States	Scottrade Center	—N/a	—N/a
August 18, 2010	Winnipeg	Canada	MTS Centre	—N/a	—N/a
August 20, 2010	Saskatoon	Canada	Credit Union Centre	—N/a	—N/a
August 22, 2010	Calgary	Canada	Pengrowth Saddledome	—N/a	—N/a
August 23, 2010	Edmonton	Canada	Rexall Place	—N/a	—N/a
September 30, 2010	Monterrey	Mexico	Estadio Tecnológico de Monterrey	—N/a	—N/a
October 2, 2010	Mexico City	Mexico	Estadio Azteca	—N/a	—N/a
October 6, 2010	Guadalajara	Mexico	Estadio 3 de Marzo	—N/a	—N/a
South America
October 15, 2010 (Note: This concert was part of the Ceara Music Festival.)	Fortaleza	Brazil	Marina Park	—N/a	—N/a
October 17, 2010	Recife	Brazil	Jockey Club	—N/a	—N/a
October 19, 2010	Salvador	Brazil	Parque de Exposições	—N/a	—N/a
October 22, 2010	Brasília	Brazil	Estádio Mané Garrincha	—N/a	—N/a
October 24, 2010	Rio de Janeiro	Brazil	Praça da Apoteose	—N/a	—N/a
October 27, 2010	Belo Horizonte	Brazil	Mega Space	—N/a	—N/a
October 30, 2010	Porto Alegre	Brazil	Fiergs Parking	—N/a	—N/a
November 1, 2010	Florianópolis	Brazil	Estádio Orlando Scarpelli	—N/a	—N/a
November 4, 2010	São Paulo	Brazil	Estádio do Morumbi	—N/a	—N/a
November 6, 2010	Buenos Aires	Argentina	GEBA Stadium	—N/a	—N/a
November 11, 2010	Santiago	Chile	Estadio Bicentenario de La Florida	—N/a	—N/a
November 13, 2010	Lima	Peru	Explanada Del Monumental	—N/a	—N/a

== Additional notes ==
- February 12, 2010 in Nashville, during will.i.am's DJ set, his power was cut and he was lowered to the main stage. Stagehands gave him a new mic, however he made motions, indicating to the audience that the microphone was not working. After several chants and stomps from the audience, the show resumed with Now Generation about 3 minutes later. will.i.am apologized (pointing out the irony of "The Energy Never Dies" and how it did) throughout the remainder of the show.
- March 9, 2010 in Auburn Hills, after will.i.am's DJ set, Kid Rock performed "All Summer Long" with Fergie, Taboo, and apl.de.ap.
- March 13, 2010 in Chicago, after will.i.am's DJ set, Fergie and Slash rose to the stage to perform "Sweet Child O Mine" and "Beautiful Dangerous" together. They performed these two songs as well at their Los Angeles concerts on March 29 and 30.
- On March 30, 2010, the performance of Missing You in Los Angeles was recorded and is the official video for the single in France.

== Recordings ==
=== The E.N.D. World Tour LIVE: Presented By Blackberry ===
The official website released a statement February 12 reading: NCM Fathom and AEG Live Team Up Again to Present an Exclusive One-Night Concert Performance with Behind-the-Scenes Footage Broadcast LIVE to Nearly 500 Select Movie Theaters... The Black Eyed Peas are getting the party started across the country on The E.N.D. World Tour, presented by BlackBerry and will rock the big screen as their concert performance from Los Angeles is transmitted LIVE nationwide on Tuesday, March 30. Broadcast from STAPLES Center to nearly 500 select movie theaters across America, The Black Eyed Peas: The E.N.D. World Tour LIVE Presented by BlackBerry event will feature a 30-minute exclusive program for movie theater audiences, including behind-the-scenes footage and band interviews.

=== Where Is the Love? (Reprise) ===
At every show there is a reprise to Where Is the Love?, in which the lights are cut and the audience gets to sing along to the song. This portion (sometimes the entire song and reprise) has been recorded and posted on Dipdive several times.

==== will.i.am's BBMe Freestyle ====
will.i.am's Freestyle from most dates are posted in the same fashion of the Where Is the Love? recordings on Dipdive.

=== Missing You (Music Video) ===
On March 30, 2010, the performance of Missing You in Los Angeles was recorded and is the official video for the single in France and Brazil.

=== Don't Stop the Party (music video) ===
The music video, which is directed by Ben Mor, features on stage and backstage footage of the group during their 'The E.N.D. World Tour' in Brazil, last year and was released to iTunes and YouTube/VEVO on May 10, 2011.

Beside live footage of the tour, music video also features panoramic shoots of Brazilian landscapes and city life. Closing section of the video documents a visit to a Brazilian record shop, during which close-ups of records by José Roberto Bertrami, Afrika Bambaataa & The Soulsonic Force, Carlos Malcolm and Di Melo are shown.
