= Missing You (Black Eyed Peas song) =

Promotional single by the Black Eyed Peas

from the album The E.N.D.
- Released: April 23, 2010
- Recorded: 2009
- Genre: Electro house
- Length: 4:35
- Label: Interscope
- Songwriters: William Adams; Allan Pineda; Jaime Gomez; Stacy Ferguson; Printz Board; Jean Baptiste
- Producers: Printz Board; will.i.am

Licensed audio
- "Missing You" on YouTube

"Missing You" is a song recorded by American group the Black Eyed Peas for their fifth studio album The E.N.D. (2009). The group co-wrote the song alongside Printz Board and Jean Baptiste, with Printz Board and will.i.am handling production. It was released as a promotional single exclusively in France on April 23, 2010, by Polydor Records.

"Missing You" failed to enter the main singles chart in France, peaking at numbers eight and 19 on the airplay and digital charts, respectively. An accompanying music video for the song was released on June 18, 2010, and included footage from the song's live performance at the Staples Center in Los Angeles during The E.N.D. World Tour (2009–2010). The song was also featured on an episode of the CBS television series NCIS.

== Critical reception ==
Talia Kraines from BBC said that the song had "wild basslines and vocal snarling".

== Commercial performance ==
"Missing You" gained heavy airplay in France and Australia. The song peaked at number eight on the official French Airplay and at number 19 on French Digital Singles chart.

== Release and promotion ==
"Missing You" was released as a promotional single exclusively in France on June 7, 2010, by Polydor Records, having impacted the contemporary hit radio in the country on April 23. It was performed live during The E.N.D. World Tour (2009–2010), and the March 30, 2010 performance at the Staples Center in Los Angeles was recorded and released on June 18 via the group's official Dipdive page, as the accompanying music video for the song in France. The song had also been featured on CBS television series NCIS episode "Moonlighting" on April 27.

== Track listing ==
- Digital download (Radio Edit)
1. "Missing You" (Radio Edit) – 4:26

== Credits and personnel ==
Credits adapted from liner notes.

- will.i.am – vocals, songwriting, synths, drum programming
- apl.de.ap – vocals, songwriting
- Fergie – vocals, songwriting
- Taboo – vocals, songwriting
- Printz Board – songwriting, production, keyboard, synths
- Jean Baptiste – songwriting
- George Pajon, Jr. – guitar

== Charts ==
Weekly chart performance for "Missing You"
Chart (2010)	Peak position
Belgium (Ultratip Wallonia)	22
France Airplay (SNEP)	8
France (SNEP) Download Chart	19

== Release history ==
Release dates and formats for "Missing You"
Region	Date	Format(s)	Label(s)	Ref.
France	April 23, 2010	Contemporary hit radio	Polydor	
France	June 7, 2010	Digital download	Polydor	
