= I Gotta Feeling =

2009 single by the Black Eyed Peas

Single by the Black Eyed Peas

from the album The E.N.D.
- Released: June 15, 2009
- Recorded: 2009
- Studio: Square Prod (Paris); Metropolis (London)
- Genre: Dance-pop
- Length: 4:49 (album and video version); 4:05 (radio edit)
- Label: Interscope
- Songwriters: William Adams; Stacy Ferguson; Jaime Gomez; David Guetta; Allan Pineda; Frédéric Riesterer
- Producers: David Guetta; Frédéric Riesterer

The Black Eyed Peas singles chronology
"Boom Boom Pow" (2009)	"I Gotta Feeling" (2009)	"Meet Me Halfway" (2009)

Music video
- "I Gotta Feeling" on YouTube

"I Gotta [sic] Feeling" is a song by American group the Black Eyed Peas from their fifth studio album The E.N.D. (2009). It was written by the group members with the song's producers David Guetta and Frédéric Riesterer. The song was released as the second single from The E.N.D. on June 15, 2009, by Interscope Records.

"I Gotta Feeling" debuted at number two on the US Billboard Hot 100, behind the group's previous single "Boom Boom Pow", making the group one of 11 artists who have occupied the top two positions of the Billboard Hot 100 at the same time. It went on to spend 14 consecutive weeks atop the Billboard Hot 100, making it the longest-running number-one single of 2009. The song was ranked at number five on the Billboard Hot 100 decade-end chart and at number eight on the all-time chart. Internationally, it peaked atop the charts in over 20 countries, and was the third most successful song of the decade in Australia.

"I Gotta Feeling" was nominated for Record of the Year at the 52nd Annual Grammy Awards (2010) and won the Grammy Award for Best Pop Performance by a Duo or Group with Vocals. It was also nominated for Song of the Year at the 2010 World Music Awards. In March 2011, it became the first song in digital history to sell over seven million digital copies in the United States. As of June 2019, it has sold over nine million downloads in the country, and held the record as the most downloaded song on the iTunes Store of all time. This also makes it the highest-selling digital non-charity single of all time in the US.

== Background ==
"I Gotta Feeling" was written and composed by all the members of the Black Eyed Peas (credited as William Adams, Allan Pineda, Jaime Gomez, and Stacy Ferguson) together with French producers David Guetta, Frédéric Riesterer (a.k.a. Fred Rister), both of whom produced the song. Adams provided additional synthesizer work to the song. The song was recorded at Square Prod in Paris, France and Metropolis Studios in London, England, United Kingdom. "I Gotta Feeling" is the second single released from The E.N.D (2009). Interscope Records serviced the song to contemporary hit and rhythmic crossover radios on June 23, 2009, in the United States. In an interview with Annie Reuter of Marie Claire, will.i.am stated that "It's dedicated to all the party people out there in the world that want to go out and party. Mostly every song on the Black Eyed Peas record is painting a picture of our party life. It was a conscious decision to make this type of record. Times are really hard for a lot of people and you want to give them escape and you want to make them feel good about life, especially at these low points."

== Composition ==
The song is an uptempo dance-pop song that runs a length of four minutes and 49 seconds and runs at a tempo of 128 beats per minute in the key of G major. It follows in the inspirational dance-pop theme of The E.N.D, being built upon the heavy use of Auto-Tune and futuristic synthesizers while running through a tick-tock rhythm. The song begins in a restrained fashion, then moves into a throbbing dance beat that changes patterns so that at least one reviewer thought it shifted tempos, although in fact the tempo does not change at all, suggesting the use of a click track in recording. It contains electronic influences. Ann Powers of Los Angeles Times noted the song's similarities to Five Stairsteps' song "O-o-h Child", writing that it emulates the song's "use of a repetitive, warm vocal line to signify a good mood coming on." According to Jimmy Iovine of the Interscope Geffen A&M label group, the melody was inspired by the U2 song "I'll Go Crazy If I Don't Go Crazy Tonight": "I sent will.i.am over to the studio to do some remixes on I'll Go Crazy. He works on them for two weeks, comes back and writes I Gotta Feeling. The chords are U2 chords, 100 per cent. Will even told them." The lyric "Fill up my cup, mazel tov" was written by will.i.am to follow the same pattern as "Psycho killer, qu'est-ce que c'est?" in the Talking Heads song "Psycho Killer": four syllables in English followed by three syllables in another language.

== Critical reception ==
Ben Westhoff of Las Vegas Weekly dismissed the song as a blend of house, electro and dancehall beats that did not work compared to songs on The E.N.D like "Imma Be" and "One Tribe", while others like David Balls (a writer for Digital Spy) considered the song "as every bit as quirky as its predecessor ("Boom Boom Pow")". Balls compared it to Girls Aloud's "Biology", writing that they sound like a collection of musical ideas "that only makes sense after a few listens." Another writer for Digital Spy, Nick Levine, praised "I Gotta Feeling" and "Rock That Body" as ace collaborations with French disc jockey David Guetta. Music critics like John Bush of All Music Guide and Andy Gill of The Independent labeled it as one of the album's best tracks. Ann Powers wrote a positive review about "I Gotta Feeling", noting that "the Peas do let in some human sweetness and light" on the song and that it uses "a repetitive, warm vocal line to signify a good mood coming on."

Mike Schiller, a writer for PopMatters, found the song to be irresistible, writing that it "is one of those dance tunes that's impossible to hate thanks to something like good natured naïveté". In his review of the album for Stuff.co.nz, Chris Schultz dismissed the lyrics, writing that they were the worst since Flo Rida's "Right Round".

The Observer-Dispatch writer David T. Farr praised the song as "the summer track of 2009", writing that "It's one of those songs you grasp onto right away and crank up as the beat goes on, even the first time you hear it (guilty as charged)." Will Hines of Consequence of Sound shared similar feelings about "I Gotta Feeling", defining it as "chart baiting". Guy Blackman, a writer for The Age, labeled "I Gotta Feeling" and "Boom Boom Pow" as further dumbed-down dance-pop songs. Bill Lamb of About.com gave the song a four-star rating, praising it for the difference of style from previous releases by the Black Eyed Peas and as a great summer song with a feel-good mood, but he criticized the lack of lyrical depth and constant use of Auto-Tune. Billboard's Chris Williams praised the song as their most mainstream release, writing that "they trade off on a simple, yet effective melody and message".

== Chart performance ==
"I Gotta Feeling" followed in the international success of The E.N.D's lead single "Boom Boom Pow". In the United States, the song debuted on the Billboard Hot 100 at number two, behind "Boom Boom Pow", prompted by sales of 249,000 downloads. The song held at number two for another week before rising to the top position on the chart. On July 30, 2009, it was reported that the song, along with "Boom Boom Pow", helped earn the Black Eyed Peas the longest run at number one on the Billboard Hot 100 by a duo or group (17 weeks). The song stayed at number one on the chart for a total of fourteen weeks before being unseated by Jay Sean's "Down". The song, together with "Boom Boom Pow", earned the group a total of 26 consecutive weeks atop the Hot 100 chart while also earning them their longest running single on the chart, with a total of 56 weeks logged.

"I Gotta Feeling" also peaked at number one on several other Billboard charts, including Hot Digital Songs, Mainstream Top 40, and Radio Songs. It was the group's second single to sell over 6 million downloads in the United States, and was certified 7× Platinum on August 25, 2010 by the Recording Industry Association of America (RIAA), signifying sales of over 7 million units. It was the first song to reach sales of over 6 million (November 25, 2010), 7 million (March 20, 2011), 8 million (June 24, 2012), and 9 million (June 7, 2019). It also earned the accolade of being the best digital seller in history.

In Canada, the song debuted on the Canadian Hot 100 at number two behind "Boom Boom Pow", similar to its beginning run in the United States, on the week ending June 27, 2009. The next week, it rose to number one following a surge in airplay, where it maintained that position for 16 consecutive weeks, setting the record for longest run at number one since the chart's inception in 2007. The song was present on the chart for a total of 76 weeks, setting the record for longest stay on the chart. The song was certified Diamond by Music Canada for sales of over 800,000 digital downloads.

"I Gotta Feeling" fared similarly in international markets. The song had a slower rise in the United Kingdom, where it debuted at number 70 on the week ending June 20, 2009. It quickly picked up momentum, moving into the top five in its fifth week on the chart. On the week ending August 8, 2009, the song peaked at number one, becoming the group's third number one and staying there for two non-consecutive weeks. "I Gotta Feeling" held within the top ten for 16 consecutive weeks and lasted on the chart for a total of 76 weeks. The song was certified 5× Platinum by the British Phonographic Industry on December 27, 2024 for sales and streams of 3 million units. "I Gotta Feeling" became the first song to sell over one million units based solely on the strength of digital downloads, and has sold over 1.44 million copies in the United Kingdom as of May 2014. In Ireland, the song peaked at number one and held that position for 12 non-consecutive weeks, falling to number two on the week of August 27, 2009, after six weeks in the top position. It rose to number one the following week and held that position for another six weeks. In Sweden, the song debuted on the chart at number 36 on the week ending July 19, 2009. It quickly entered the top ten and peaked at number one in its seventh week on the chart. "I Gotta Feeling" maintained its position there for eight consecutive weeks and stayed present on the charts for a total of 87 weeks. The single was certified double platinum for sales of 40,000 units. In Germany, the song debuted on the chart at number seven and rose to number three two weeks later.

"I Gotta Feeling" peaked at number one in countries including Australia, Austria, Belgium, Denmark, Italy, The Netherlands, and New Zealand. The song reached top five peak positions in Finland, France, Norway, and Spain. It has sold over seven million units worldwide in 2009 and an additional six million in 2010, as reported by the IFPI.

== Live performances ==
On September 8, 2009, the song was performed (with slight modification) by the Black Eyed Peas for the taping of the Kick-off Party for the 24th season of The Oprah Winfrey Show, with 21,000 fans performing a dance on the "Magnificent Mile" portion of Michigan Avenue in Chicago, Illinois. They also performed the song at the 52nd Grammy Awards nomination announcement ceremony with David Guetta (a remix edit by David Guetta appears on his album, One Love). The Black Eyed Peas also performed the song during a concert at Mont Kiara, Kuala Lumpur, Malaysia in 2009. Being the headliners of the Super Bowl XLV halftime show, the Black Eyed Peas sang "I Gotta Feeling" in front of more than 100,000 fans at Cowboys Stadium. On April 29, 2011, they performed the song along with others at the "i.am.FIRST" event at the FIRST Robotics Competition World Championships. For Queen Elizabeth II's Diamond Jubilee Concert, will.i.am and Jessie J sang a duet of "I Gotta Feeling". At the last part of the 2019 Southeast Asian Games closing ceremony at the New Clark City Athletics Stadium in the Philippines, this song was performed again, except that Fergie's part was sung by J Rey Soul (stage name of Jessica Reynoso), whom apl.de.ap introduced to the audience.

== Music video ==
A party scene showing (from left to right) Apl.de.ap, Fergie, will.i.am and Taboo in the official music video for "I Gotta Feeling".

The official final version of the music video was released on June 2, 2009 on Dipdive and on June 15, 2009 on iTunes. There is both a censored version and an explicit version of the music video, as well as a live performance of the explicit video. The video starts with scenes in Hollywood Blvd., then shows will.i.am combing his hair and Fergie putting on make-up while wearing lingerie. It also shows Taboo checking his messages on Dipdive and apl.de.ap checking his text messages. Then, it cuts to a party as the first verse starts. The video ends with a large sign with human-sized letters that reads "The E.N.D". The video is directed by Mikey Mee of Little Minx and features guest appearances by David Guetta, Kid Cudi, members of the indie rock band Gossip, the designer duo Dean and Dan Caten of Dsquared^{2} and RuPaul's Drag Race alumni Ongina.

== Track listing ==
- Digital download (worldwide version)
1. "I Gotta Feeling" – 4:49
- UK CD single
1. "I Gotta Feeling" (Radio Edit) – 4:06
2. "Boom Boom Pow" (David Guetta's Electro Hop Remix) – 4:05
- German CD single
1. "I Gotta Feeling" (Radio Edit) – 4:06
2. "Boom Boom Guetta" (David Guetta's Electro Hop Remix) – 4:05
3. "I Gotta Feeling" (Instrumental Version) – 4:49
4. "I Gotta Feeling" (Official Video) – 4:52
- Digital download E.P.
1. "I Gotta Feeling" (David Guetta's FMIF Remix) – 6:12
2. "I Gotta Feeling" (Printz Board vs. Zuper Blahq Remix) – 5:04
3. "I Gotta Feeling" (Laidback Luke Remix) – 6:28
4. "I Gotta Feeling" (Zuper Blahq Remix) – 5:48
5. "I Gotta Feeling" (Taboo's Broken Spanglish Remix) – 4:51

== Credits and personnel ==
Credits adapted from the liner notes of The E.N.D, Interscope Records, in association with will.i.am Music Group.

Recording and mixing

- Recorded at Square Prod in Paris, France and Metropolis Studios in London, England, United Kingdom.
- Mixed by Dylan "3-D" Dresdow at Paper V.U. Studios and Record Plant in Los Angeles, CA, US.

Personnel

- Songwriting – will.i.am, apl.de.ap, Taboo, Fergie, David Guetta, Frederick Riesterer
- Vocals – will.i.am, apl.de.ap, Taboo, Fergie
- Production – David Guetta, Frederick Riesterer
- Synths – will.i.am

== Charts ==
=== Weekly charts ===
Chart (2009–2011)	Peak position
Australia (ARIA)	1
Austria (Ö3 Austria Top 40)	1
Belgium (Ultratop 50 Flanders)	1
Belgium (Ultratop 50 Wallonia)	1
Canada Hot 100 (Billboard)	1
CIS Airplay (TopHit)	32
Croatia International Airplay (Top lista)	1
Czech Republic Airplay (ČNS IFPI)	1
Denmark (Tracklisten)	1
Euro Digital Song Sales (Billboard)	1
Finland (Suomen virallinen lista)	5
France (SNEP)	2
Germany (GfK)	3
Hungary (Dance Top 40)	4
Hungary (Rádiós Top 40)	2
Ireland (IRMA)	1
Israel International Airplay (Media Forest)	1
Italy (FIMI)	1
Japan Hot 100 (Billboard)	2
Luxembourg Digital Songs (Billboard)	1
Mexico Anglo (Monitor Latino)	1
Netherlands (Dutch Top 40)	1
Netherlands (Single Top 100)	3
New Zealand (Recorded Music NZ)	1
Norway (VG-lista)	2
Poland Dance (ZPAV)	20
Portugal Digital Song Sales (Billboard)	1
Romania (Romanian Top 100)	1
Romania Airplay (Media Forest)	1
Russia Airplay (TopHit)	41
Scottish Singles Sales (Official Charts)	1
Slovakia Airplay (ČNS IFPI)	1
Spain (Promusicae)	2
Sweden (Sverigetopplistan)	1
Switzerland (Schweizer Hitparade)	1
UK Singles (Official Charts)	1
UK Hip Hop/R&B (Official Charts)	1
US Billboard Hot 100	1
US Adult Contemporary (Billboard)	16
US Adult Pop Airplay (Billboard)	4
US Dance Club Songs (Billboard)	9
US Dance Airplay (Billboard)	4
US Hot Latin Songs (Billboard)	12
US Pop Airplay (Billboard)	1
US Rhythmic Airplay (Billboard)	2

Chart (2020–2026)	Peak position
Global 200 (Billboard)	142
Malta Airplay (Radiomonitor)	18
Nigeria Bubbling Under Hot 100 (TurnTable)	16
Nigeria Airplay (TurnTable)	84
Poland Airplay (ZPAV)	54
Romania Airplay (TopHit)	97

=== Monthly charts ===
Chart (2009)	Position
Brazil (Brasil Hot 100 Airplay)	8
Brazil (Brasil Hot Pop Songs)	3
CIS (TopHit)	34

=== Year-end charts ===
Chart (2009)	Position
Australia (ARIA)	1
Australia Dance (ARIA)	1
Austria (Ö3 Austria Top 40)	3
Belgium (Ultratop 50 Flanders)	4
Belgium (Ultratop 50 Wallonia)	3
Brazil Airplay (Crowley)	23
Canada (Canadian Hot 100)	1
CIS (TopHit)	132
Croatia International Airplay (HRT)	5
Denmark (Tracklisten)	21
European Hot 100 Singles (Billboard)	4
France (SNEP)	27
Germany (GfK)	9
Hungary (Dance Top 40)	33
Hungary (Rádiós Top 40)	42
Ireland (IRMA)	2
Japan (Japan Hot 100)	20
Japan Adult Contemporary (Billboard)	1
Netherlands (Dutch Top 40)	1
Netherlands (Single Top 100)	6
New Zealand (Recorded Music NZ)	1
Norway (VG-lista)	8
Russia Airplay (TopHit)	195
Spain (PROMUSICAE)	5
Sweden (Sverigetopplistan)	7
Switzerland (Schweizer Hitparade)	7
UK Singles (Official Charts)	2
US Billboard Hot 100	4
US Adult Pop Airplay (Billboard)	23
US Dance/Mix Show Airplay (Billboard)	15
US Hot Latin Songs (Billboard)	54
US Pop Airplay (Billboard)	3
US Rhythmic (Billboard)	20

Chart (2010)	Position
Australia (ARIA)	53
Australia Dance (ARIA)	12
Austria (Ö3 Austria Top 40)	68
Belgium (Ultratop 50 Flanders)	9
Belgium (Ultratop 50 Wallonia)	6
Brazil (Crowley)	10
Canada (Canadian Hot 100)	10
France Airplay (SNEP)	1
Germany (GfK)	46
Hungary (Dance Top 40)	27
Hungary (Rádiós Top 40)	2
Italy (FIMI)	39
Netherlands (Single Top 100)	7
South Korea Foreign (Gaon)	103
Spain (PROMUSICAE)	27
Sweden (Sverigetopplistan)	51
Switzerland (Schweizer Hitparade)	17
UK Singles (Official Charts)	72
US Billboard Hot 100	29
US Adult Contemporary (Billboard)	50

Chart (2011)	Position
Netherlands (Single Top 100)	88
UK Singles (Official Charts)	154

Chart (2012)	Position
France (SNEP)	143

=== Decade-end charts ===
Chart (2000–2009)	Position
Australia (ARIA)	3
UK Singles (OCC)	18
US Billboard Hot 100	5

=== Centurial charts ===
Chart	Position
US Billboard Hot 100 21st century	5

=== All-time charts ===
Chart	Position
UK Singles (Official Charts)	46
US Billboard Hot 100	8
US Pop Airplay (Billboard)	87

== Certifications ==
Certifications and sales
Region	Certification	Certified units/sales
Australia (ARIA)	13× Platinum	910,000^{‡}
Belgium (BRMA)	2× Platinum	
Brazil (Pro-Música Brasil)	Diamond	250,000^{‡}
Canada (Music Canada)	Diamond	400,000^{*}
Denmark (IFPI Danmark)	2× Platinum	180,000^{‡}
France (SNEP)	Diamond	414,000
Germany (BVMI)	5× Gold	1,500,000^{‡}
Italy (FIMI)	3× Platinum	210,000^{‡}
Japan (RIAJ)	Platinum	250,000^{*}
New Zealand (RMNZ)	8× Platinum	240,000^{‡}
Portugal (AFP)	3× Platinum	75,000^{‡}
Spain (Promusicae)	3× Platinum	180,000^{‡}
Sweden (GLF)	Platinum	20,000^{‡}
Switzerland (IFPI Switzerland)	2× Platinum	60,000^{^}
United Kingdom (BPI)	5× Platinum	3,000,000^{‡}
United States (RIAA)	15× Platinum	15,000,000^{‡}
^{*} Sales figures based on certification alone.^{^} Shipments figures based on certification alone.^{‡} Sales+streaming figures based on certification alone.

== Release history ==
Release dates and formats
Region	Date	Format(s)	Label(s)	Ref.
United States	June 15, 2009	Contemporary hit radio; rhythmic contemporary radio	Interscope	
Germany	July 10, 2009	Maxi CD	Universal Music	
Australia	July 13, 2009	Maxi CD	Universal Music	
United Kingdom	July 13, 2009	CD	Polydor	
Germany	July 17, 2009	CD	Universal Music	
France	September 14, 2009	CD	Polydor	

== Other cover versions and use in popular media ==
- In September 2009, Canadian freshmen students from Université du Québec à Montréal performed the song as a lip dub as part of orientation week. After a month, their video had over one million views on YouTube and was talked about on media outlets around the world, including American news channel CNN. This in turn was later referenced by the season 7 premiere of the television series The Office, in which the show's cast performs a similar lip dub set to The Human Beinz's cover of "Nobody but Me".
- Justine Ezarik produced a parody video of the song that focused on going to events mainly to update one's social media profile picture; it gained 16 million views on YouTube.
- The Nickelodeon Mega Music Fest 2010 opens with a cover of this song performed by cast members from The Backyardigans, Dora the Explorer, Ni Hao, Kai-Lan, Blue's Clues, Wonder Pets!, and Team Umizoomi.
- The song was played prior to the entrance of the athletes at the Men's Ice Hockey Final at the 2010 Winter Olympics in Vancouver and 2014 Winter Olympics in Sochi.
- The song is featured in the 2015 video game Just Dance 2016.

== See also ==
- List of best-selling singles
- List of best-selling singles in Australia
- List of number-one singles in Australia in 2009
- List of number-one hits of 2009 (Austria)
- List of Hot 100 number-one singles of 2009 (Canada)
- Dutch Top 40 number-one hits of 2009
- List of number-one singles of 2009 (Ireland)
- List of number-one hits of 2009 (Italy)
- List of number-one singles from the 2000s (New Zealand)
- List of Romanian Top 100 number ones of the 2000s
- List of Romanian Top 100 number ones of the 2010s
- List of number-one hits of 2009 (Switzerland)
- List of Swedish number-one hits
- List of number-one singles from the 2000s (UK)
- List of number-one R&B hits of 2009 (UK)
- List of Hot 100 number-one singles of 2009 (U.S.)
- List of Mainstream Top 40 number-one hits of 2009 (U.S.)
- Ultratop 40 number-one hits of 2009
