= Rock That Body =

2010 single by The Black Eyed Peas

Single by the Black Eyed Peas

from the album The E.N.D.
- B-side: "Imma Be"
- Released: January 29, 2010
- Genre: Dance-pop
- Length: 4:28 (album version); 3:58 (radio edit)
- Label: Interscope
- Songwriters: Adam Walder; Allan Pineda; David Guetta; James Brown; Jaime Gomez; Jamie Munson; Jean Baptiste; Mark Knight; Robert Ginyard; Stacy Ferguson; William Adams
- Producers: David Guetta; will.i.am; Mark Knight; Funkagenda

Black Eyed Peas singles chronology
"Imma Be" (2010)	"Rock That Body" (2010)	"The Time (Dirty Bit)" (2010)

Audio sample
- file; help

Music video
- "Rock That Body" on YouTube

"Rock That Body" is a song by the Black Eyed Peas from their fifth studio album The E.N.D. (2009). The song serves as the fifth international single from the album, and was released in May 11. The song peaked at number nine on the US Billboard Hot 100, becoming the fifth top ten hit from the album. The song re-entered charts in 2025, 15 years after its original release, due to a viral dance trend.

== Composition ==
Co-produced by French DJ/producer David Guetta, the song heavily samples from Rob Base and DJ E-Z Rock's "It Takes Two", making use of the line "I wanna rock right now" multiple times, as well as the drum break, and part of the "Yeah! Woo!" line. The Black Eyed Peas use Auto-Tune throughout the song, and Fergie's voice has been notably high-pitched. Spin described "Rock That Body" as "trance-y". The song is most known to critics as a robotic party track on the album. The song has been compared to be stylistically similar to Flo Rida, whose song "Club Can't Handle Me" (from the motion picture Step Up 3D) Guetta would later go on to produce.

== Critical reception ==
Fraser McAlpine of the BBC Chart Blog gave "Rock That Body" three out of five stars and called it "a party banger". "Rock That Body" was well-reviewed by Mike Schiller of PopMatters. Alex Fletcher of Digital Spy gave the song a positive review stating: "It's got plenty of pounding beats, synths that sound like they've been filled with Red Bull and more twisted vocal effects than an mp3 of Akon cutting loose in a vocoder factory. It's pretty simple stuff and it will no doubt grate something rotten on the 36th listen..."

== Commercial performance ==
The song was a success, reaching the top ten in many countries and top twenty in a number of others, too. On the US Billboard Hot 100, the song peaked at number nine, making it their fifth consecutive top ten hit. For airplay, it proved to be their lowest-charting song since non-single "Gone Going" from their fourth studio album Monkey Business (2005), released to radio stations in early 2006.

The song re-entered charts in 2025 following a viral dance trend on TikTok.

== Music video ==
From left to right apl.de.ap, Taboo, Fergie and will.i.am holding stereo-guns in the second half of "Imma Be Rocking That Body".

The video was filmed on January 13, 2010, at Paramount Studios in Los Angeles, California. Directed by Rich Lee, it was shot back to back with the video for "Imma Be", the fourth song on The E.N.D. The two songs were mashed up into a medley, which is titled "Imma Be Rocking That Body". The video is the sequel for the "Imma Be" video and the second half of the "Imma Be Rocking That Body" video, which premiered on Vevo and Dipdive on Tuesday, February 16, 2010. The videos were separated for music channels with the introduction and conclusion removed. The video is described as a futuristic Wizard of Oz. It begins with the Black Eyed Peas and their good robot arriving in a city, the people in the city are stuck in a glitch. The 4 members of the group shoot them with their stereo-guns to end their loop so they could continue dancing. As things are going well, the bad robot appears and kidnaps Fergie, will.i.am chases after it with his own robot while Fergie fights the bad robot and the other two members free the remaining people. After many failed attempts, will.i.am manages to shoot the bad robot, which initiates a dance-off with the good robot. The video ends as the bad robot runs out of energy and collapses. The "Imma Be Rocking That Body" video closes with a scene which reveals the entire story to be Fergie's dream as the other members find her barely conscious following her motorcycle accident in the introduction. As they check to see if she is okay, Fergie excitedly begins to tell them of her idea for their next music video.

== Track listings ==
UK CD Single

No.	Title	Length
1.	"Rock That Body" (Radio Edit)	3:58
2.	"Meet Me Halfway" (will.i.am Meet Me At The Remix)	5:49
Total length:		9:47

Digital Download E.P.

No.	Title	Length
1.	"Imma Be" (Wolfgang Gartner Remix)	6:24
2.	"Imma Be" (Danger Olympic Remix)	4:31
3.	"Imma Be" (Poet Name Life & DJ Ammo Remix)	4:42
4.	"Rock That Body" (Skrillex Remix)	5:09
5.	"Rock That Body" (Chris Lake Remix)	5:54
6.	"Rock That Body" (apl.de.ap and DJ Replay Remix)	5:54
Total length:		31:21

== Personnel ==
- Songwriting – will.i.am, apl.de.ap, Taboo, Fergie, David Guetta, Mark Knight, Adam Walder, Jean Baptiste, Jamie Munson, Robert Ginyard
- Vocals – will.i.am, apl.de.ap, Taboo, Fergie
- Production – David Guetta, will.i.am, Mark Knight, Funkagenda
- Keyboards – Mark Knight, Adam Walder, will.i.am
- Guitar, additional keyboards, additional vocals – Hal Ritson
- Arrangement – will.i.am

== Charts ==
=== Weekly charts ===
2010 weekly chart performance
Chart (2010)	Peak position
Australia (ARIA)	8
Austria (Ö3 Austria Top 40)	7
Belgium (Ultratop 50 Flanders)	4
Belgium (Ultratop 50 Wallonia)	5
Canada Hot 100 (Billboard)	41
CIS Airplay (TopHit)	110
Czech Republic Airplay (ČNS IFPI)	23
European Hot 100 Singles (Billboard)	6
Finland (Suomen virallinen lista)	19
France (SNEP)	7
Germany (GfK)	10
Hungary (Editors' Choice Top 40)	39
Ireland (IRMA)	9
Israel International Airplay (Media Forest)	7
Italy (Musica e dischi)	2
Mexico Anglo (Monitor Latino)	10
Netherlands (Dutch Top 40)	17
Netherlands (Single Top 100)	38
New Zealand (Recorded Music NZ)	16
Poland (Dance Top 50)	13
Portugal Digital Song Sales (Billboard)	6
Russia Airplay (TopHit)	108
Scottish Singles Sales (Official Charts)	11
Slovakia Airplay (ČNS IFPI)	23
Spain Airplay (PROMUSICAE)	18
Switzerland (Schweizer Hitparade)	27
UK Singles (Official Charts)	11
UK Dance (Official Charts)	1
US Billboard Hot 100	9
US Dance Club Songs (Billboard)	5
US Pop Airplay (Billboard)	12
US Rhythmic Airplay (Billboard)	18

2025 weekly chart performance
Chart (2025)	Peak position
Australia (ARIA)	24
Austria (Ö3 Austria Top 40)	6
Canada Hot 100 (Billboard)	36
Czech Republic Singles Digital (ČNS IFPI)	19
Global 200 (Billboard)	20
Greece International (IFPI)	48
Hungary (Single Top 40)	37
Israel International Airplay (Media Forest)	14
Japan Hot Overseas (Billboard Japan)	20
Latvia Streaming (LaIPA)	4
Lithuania (AGATA)	18
Lithuania Airplay (TopHit)	98
Norway (IFPI Norge)	63
Poland (Polish Streaming Top 100)	22
Portugal (AFP)	108
Russia Streaming (TopHit)	31
Slovakia Singles Digital (ČNS IFPI)	29
Sweden (Sverigetopplistan)	58
Switzerland (Schweizer Hitparade)	17
UK Singles (Official Charts)	31
UK Dance (Official Charts)	9

=== Monthly charts ===
2025 monthly chart performance
Chart (2025)	Peak position
Russia Streaming (TopHit)	32

=== Year-end charts ===
Chart (2010)	Position
Australia (ARIA)	68
Austria (Ö3 Austria Top 40)	64
Belgium (Ultratop Flanders)	42
Belgium (Ultratop Wallonia)	25
Brazil (Crowley)	44
European Hot 100 Singles (Billboard)	52
France (SNEP)	41
Italy (FIMI)	58
Italy Airplay (EarOne)	63
UK Singles (OCC)	117
US Billboard Hot 100	75

Chart (2025)	Position
Austria (Ö3 Austria Top 40)	69
Global 200 (Billboard)	192

== Certifications ==
Region	Certification	Certified units/sales
Australia (ARIA)	3× Platinum	210,000^{‡}
Brazil (Pro-Música Brasil)	Gold	30,000^{‡}
Canada (Music Canada)	Gold	40,000^{*}
France (SNEP)	Gold	100,000^{‡}
Germany (BVMI)	Gold	300,000^{‡}
Italy (FIMI)	Gold	15,000^{*}
New Zealand (RMNZ)	2× Platinum	60,000^{‡}
United Kingdom (BPI)	Platinum	600,000^{‡}
United States (RIAA)	3× Platinum	3,000,000^{‡}
^{*} Sales figures based on certification alone.^{‡} Sales+streaming figures based on certification alone.

== Release history ==
Release dates and formats
Region	Date	Format(s)	Label(s)	Ref.
Australia	January 29, 2010	CD	Universal Music	
United Kingdom	March 15, 2010	CD	Polydor	
Germany	March 19, 2010	CD	Universal Music	
France	April 6, 2010	CD	Polydor	
United States	May 11, 2010	Contemporary hit radio	Interscope	

== See also ==
- List of number-one dance hits of 2010 (UK)
