= Alive (Black Eyed Peas song) =

Promotional single by the Black Eyed Peas

from the album The E.N.D.
- Released: May 23, 2009
- Recorded: 2008–2009
- Genre: Disco; electro-funk
- Length: 5:04
- Label: Interscope
- Songwriters: William Adams; Allan Pineda; Stacy Ferguson; Jaime Gomez; Keith Harris; Ricky Walters
- Producer: will.i.am

Audio video
- "Alive" on YouTube

"Alive" is a song recorded by the Black Eyed Peas for their fifth studio album The E.N.D. (2009). It was released on May 23, 2009 as the second promotional single in the campaign "The Countdown to The E.N.D.", the first being "Imma Be" and the third being "Meet Me Halfway", which were later released as commercial singles.

== Music and lyrics ==
"Alive" is a mid-tempo piano and guitar-driven disco and electro-funk song composed in the key of B minor. will.i.am stated: "Alive is a song about love, is about a relationship, when that person makes you feel renewed, when the person you love makes you feel anything negative in the world matters, "Alive", I'm so proud of the production of this music, pay attention to the layers, textures and elements, I love this song."

== Track listing ==
Digital download
No.	Title	Length
1.	"Alive" (album version)	5:04

== Credits and personnel ==
Credits are adapted from the liner notes of The E.N.D.

- apl.de.ap – songwriting, vocals
- Fergie – songwriting, vocals
- Keith Harris – songwriting
- Josh Lopez – guitar
- Caleb Speir – bass
- Taboo – songwriting, vocals
- Ricky Walters – songwriting
- will.i.am – piano, production, songwriting, synthesizer, vocals

== Charts ==
Weekly chart performance for "Alive"
Chart (2009)	Peak position
Canada Hot 100 (Billboard)	62
Japan Hot 100 (Billboard)	79
UK Singles (Official Charts)	88
US Bubbling Under Hot 100 (Billboard)	2
US Digital Song Sales (Billboard)	74

== Release history ==
Release dates and formats for "Alive"
Region	Date	Format(s)	Label(s)	Ref.
Various	May 23, 2009	Digital download	Interscope	
