= The E.N.D. =

2009 album by Black Eyed Peas

- Standard cover (Note: Deluxe edition cover features a white background and the face in red.)

Studio album by the Black Eyed Peas
- Released: June 3, 2009
- Recorded: 2006 – October 15, 2008
- Studios: Ethernet (Los Angeles); Jeepney (Los Angeles); Metropolis (London); Square Prod (Paris)
- Genres: Pop; hip-hop; EDM
- Length: 67:20
- Label: Interscope
- Producers: apl.de.ap; Jean Baptiste; Printz Board; DJ Replay; Funkagenda; David Guetta; Keith Harris; Mark Knight; Poet Name Life; Frederic Riesterer; will.i.am

The Black Eyed Peas chronology
Renegotiations: The Remixes (2006)	The E.N.D. (2009)	The Beginning (2010)

Singles from The E.N.D.
- 1. "Boom Boom Pow" Released: February 22, 2009; 2. "I Gotta Feeling" Released: June 15, 2009; 3. "Meet Me Halfway" Released: September 22, 2009; 4. "Imma Be" Released: January 12, 2010; 5. "Rock That Body" Released: January 29, 2010

The E.N.D. (an abbreviation of and subtitled The Energy Never Dies) is the fifth studio album by American group the Black Eyed Peas. It was released on June 3, 2009, by Interscope Records.

While on The Monkey Business Tour, which they embarked on in support of their fourth studio album Monkey Business (2005), Black Eyed Peas began recording material for their fifth studio album. Tentatively titled From Roots to Fruits, it was originally set for a late 2007 release before being retitled and postponed several times. Executive producer will.i.am produced The E.N.D. with fellow member apl.de.ap and longtime collaborators Printz Board and Poet Name Life, alongside David Guetta, Jean Baptiste, DJ Replay, Funkagenda, Keith Harris, Mark Knight and Frederic Riesterer. Their final product was a pop, hip-hop and EDM album, with elements of electro-funk and significantly differing from their previous albums. However, its lyrical themes were similar to its predecessors Elephunk (2003) and Monkey Business.

Upon its release, The E.N.D. received mixed reviews from music critics, who described it as containing more anthemic and inspirational songs in the group's bid to appeal to a new generation of music listeners. It was Black Eyed Peas' first number-one album on the US Billboard 200, debuting atop the chart with first-week sales of 304,000 copies. Internationally, it reached number one in Australia, Belgium, Canada, France, New Zealand and Portugal. At the 52nd Annual Grammy Awards, the album was nominated for six awards, including Album of the Year, and Record of the Year for "I Gotta Feeling", and won the award for Best Pop Vocal Album. By June 2011, the album had sold over 11 million copies worldwide, making it one of the best-selling albums of the 21st century.

The E.N.D. produced five singles, all of which peaked within the top ten on the US Billboard Hot 100. "Boom Boom Pow" and "I Gotta Feeling" led the Billboard Hot 100 back-to-back, putting the band at the summit for a record-breaking 26 consecutive weeks. The group's first two number-one singles on the chart, the former spent 12 weeks atop the chart and the latter spent 14. "Meet Me Halfway" peaked at number seven on the Billboard Hot 100 and at number one in nine countries. "Imma Be" was the group's third Billboard Hot 100 number-one hit, and reached the top ten in Australia, Canada, and Hungary. The final single "Rock That Body" peaked at number nine on the Billboard Hot 100 and within the top ten in nine countries. To further promote the album, the group embarked on The E.N.D. World Tour (2009–2010).

== Recording and production ==
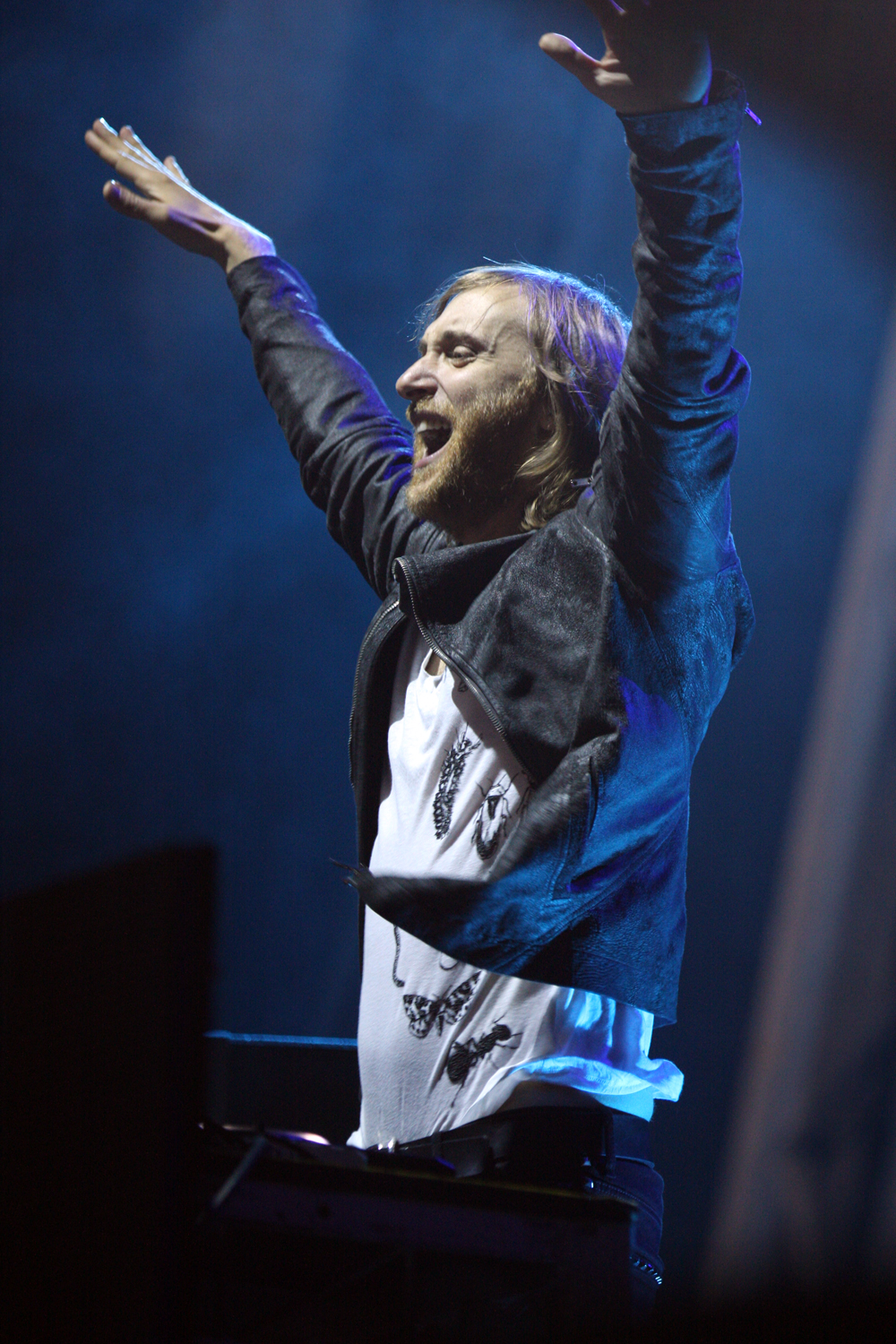
David Guetta co-wrote and produced "Rock That Body" and "I Gotta Feeling".

Black Eyed Peas began recording material for their fifth studio album during their The Monkey Business Tour, on which they embarked in support of their fourth studio album Monkey Business (2005). In December 2006, will.i.am revealed that the group had recorded 12 songs and would "probably do another 30 or 40". The album was put on hold in 2007, as group members focused on solo projects–Fergie was promoting her debut solo studio album The Dutchess (2006), which peaked at number two on the US Billboard 200 and produced three US Billboard Hot 100 number-one singles, and will.i.am released his third studio album Songs About Girls. Production resumed the following year; the recording was completed on October 15, 2008, at the Metropolis Studios in London. Most of the album was recorded in Los Angeles, either at the Ethernet Studios or the Jeepney Music Studio. David Guetta-produced songs–"Rock That Body" and "I Gotta Feeling"–were recorded at Square Prod in Paris.

Apart from Guetta, Black Eyed Peas worked with longtime collaborators Printz Board and Poet Name Life for The E.N.D., as well as first-time collaborators Jean Baptiste, DJ Replay, Funkagenda, Keith Harris, Mark Knight and Frederic Riesterer. apl.de.ap, Fergie, Taboo and will.i.am wrote all the tracks, including the four deluxe edition bonus tracks. Executive producer will.i.am produced 12 out of 15 tracks, while apl.de.ap produced "Showdown" and bonus track "Mare". will.i.am remarked that The E.N.D. was inspired by a trip to Australia, specifically a concert from the Presets, stating: "The energy on the Presets' small little stage was crazy energy. That song "My People" – that is wild. That's the reason why this record sounds the way it does – my three months in Australia." The album was mastered by Chris Bellman, who was assisted by Brian "BC" Catena, at the Bernie Grundman Mastering in Los Angeles.

== Music and lyrics ==
Briefly after the production of The E.N.D. commenced in 2006, will.i.am revealed its songs would address social and political issues, but that the album would be a "fun record" regardless, adding: "We are not complaining. It's not 'Oh everything message up! Oh my gosh, we're doomed!' It's a thinking record. It brings up what's happening in the world. Monkey Business didn't do that." Musically, the album was described by will.i.am as "a lot of dance stuff, real melodic, electronic, soulful. We call it, like, electric static funk, something like that." Vibe called it "a mélange of soulful electro-funk and addictive rave-ready anthems". In addition, other critics labeled The E.N.D. an EDM, hip-hop and pop record. The album opens with a vocally-manipulated spoken word hidden intro by will.i.am, who states: "Everything around you is changing. Nothing stays the same. This version of myself is not permanent. Tomorrow I will be different. The energy never dies." The intro segues into "Boom Boom Pow", which lyrically sees the group declaring their superiority over rivals and enemies through a futuristic quality; the theme is also present on "Electric City" and "Showdown".

Trance track "Rock That Body" features heavy usage of Auto-Tune, with Fergie's vocals notably high-pitched. Lyrically, the song is among The E.N.D.'s party-themed tracks, alongside "Imma Be", "I Gotta Feeling", "Party All the Time" and "Rockin to the Beat". In an interview for Marie Claire, will.i.am claimed "I Gotta Feeling" was "dedicated to all the party people out there in the world that want to go out and party", adding that nearly every track on the album "is painting a picture of our party life. It was a conscious decision to make this type of record. Times are really hard for a lot of people and you want to give them escape and you want to make them feel good about life, especially at these low points." The album's mid-tempo tracks deal with relationships–"Meet Me Halfway" features two partners trying to work on their struggling relationship, while "Alive" features a male protagonist trying to "rekindle love's spark". The love song theme continues with "Missing You", which features "wild basslines and vocal snarling". "Ring-A-Ling" speaks about casual sex, mentioning the term "booty call". Inspirational lyrical themes prevail on "Now Generation", a power pop guitar and harmonica-driven track, and the world peace-themed "One Tribe". "Now Generation" additionally references iChat, Mac, Myspace, Facebook, Google and Wikipedia.

== Title and artwork ==
The title for the Black Eyed Peas' fifth studio album had been thought about since 2006, around the time Fergie released her debut solo studio album The Dutchess. It was originally titled Evolution, but that was also the title for what would become Ciara's second studio album. The title was then tentatively changed to From Roots to Fruits, before the group decided it might be better suited for a future compilation album. The title was changed again to The Energy Never Dies, before being shortened to The E.N.D.

In an interview with Billboard, will.i.am stated that the title The Energy Never Dies described his model for a project that would be living and frequently updated throughout its designated cycle: "It's a diary [...] of music that at any given time, depending on the inspiration, you can add to it", adding: "I'm trying to break away from the concept of an album. What is an album when you put 12 songs on iTunes and people can pick at it like scabs? That's not an album. There is no album anymore."

Designed by Mathew Cullen and Mark Kudsi, the album cover for The E.N.D. was revealed on April 30, 2009, showing a green face against a black background. will.i.am explained: "This is the face of digital energy. This is what we look like when Fergie, apl, Taboo, and will.i.am combine digitally. We are one in this image. This is the E.N.D.!!!!" The green face had already appeared in the accompanying music video for the album's lead single "Boom Boom Pow" earlier that month, directed by Cullen and Kudsi.

== Release and promotion ==
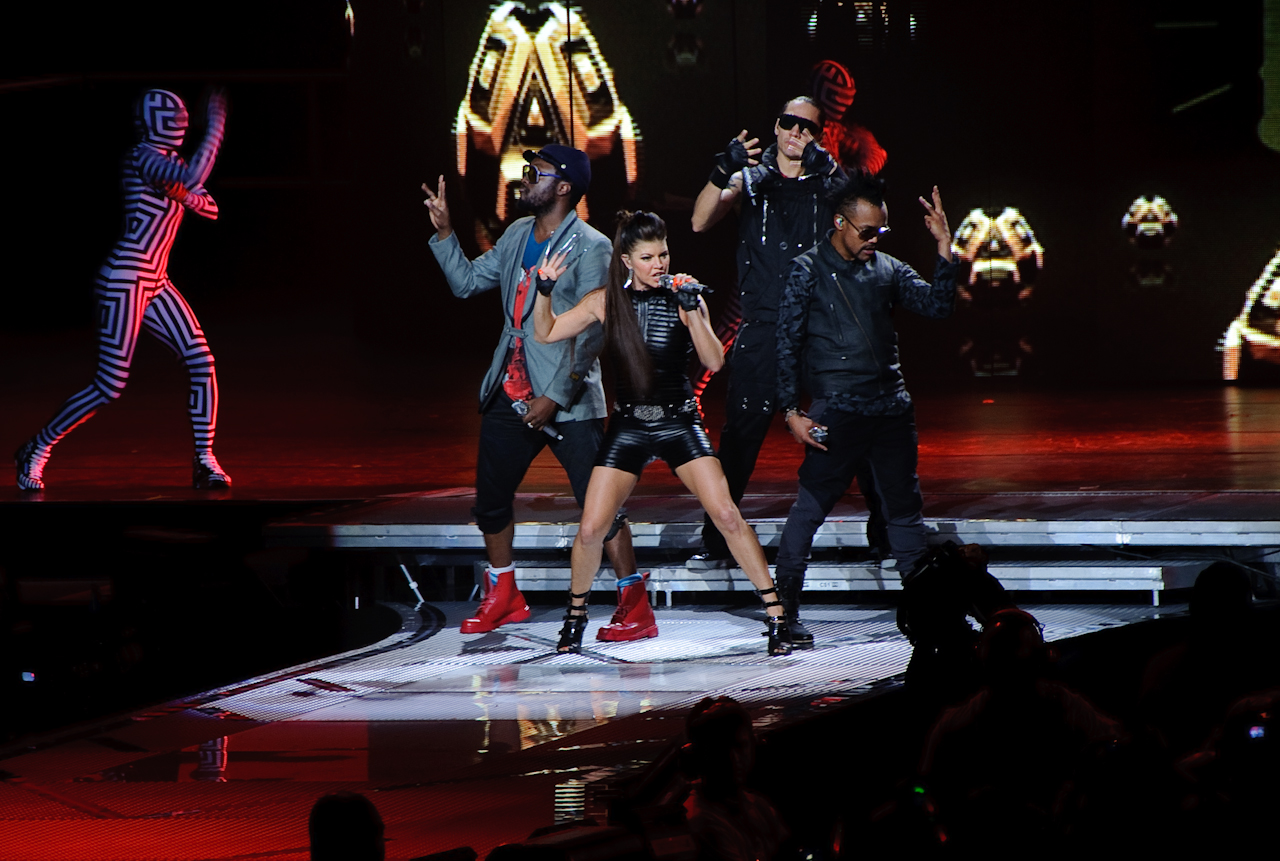
The Black Eyed Peas performing during The E.N.D. World Tour on October 7, 2009

The E.N.D. was originally set to be released within the second half of 2007, before being postponed indefinitely due to the group members' solo efforts. In October 2008, will.i.am expressed his hopes of releasing the album by the end of the year. However, it was pushed back to March 2009, before ultimately being set for June 9 in the United States. Leading up to the release, a campaign titled "The Countdown to The E.N.D." was organized, producing three promotional singles–"Imma Be" on May 19, "Alive" on May 23, and "Meet Me Halfway" on June 2. A double-disc deluxe edition was released simultaneously with the standard edition; in the US, it was released exclusively at Target stores. The album and its deluxe edition were promoted by a Target commercial featuring the group perform "I Gotta Feeling". Black Eyed Peas performed at various festivals across the US and Europe from May to September, most notably Wango Tango and the Glastonbury Festival 2009. In addition, the group performed "Boom Boom Pow" on the eighth season finale of American Idol on May 20. They promoted the album in Japan by performing "Boom Boom Pow" with Koda Kumi as guests on her tour on May 31, and "I Gotta Feeling" on Music Station on June 5.

In the US, "I Gotta Feeling" was performed on the Late Show with David Letterman on June 9 and the 2009 Teen Choice Awards on August 9. In Canada, Black Eyed Peas performed "Boom Boom Pow" at the 2009 MuchMusic Video Awards on June 21. The group also headlined the NFL Kickoff Game for the 2009 season on September 10. In Germany, the group promoted The E.N.D. by performing "I Gotta Feeling" on Wetten, dass..? on November 7. They further promoted the album in the United Kingdom on November 8 by performing "Boom Boom Pow", "Meet Me Halfway" and "I Gotta Feeling" on BBC Switch, and "Meet Me Halfway" on The X Factor. On November 14, Black Eyed Peas performed "I Gotta Feeling", "Meet Me Halfway" and "Boom Boom Pow" on Saturday Night Live. They then performed "Boom Boom Pow" and "Meet Me Halfway" at the Victoria's Secret Fashion Show 2009 on November 19, and at the American Music Awards 2009 on November 22. In France, the group performed "Meet Me Halfway" and "I Gotta Feeling" at the NRJ Music Awards on January 23, 2010. At the 52nd Annual Grammy Awards on January 31, where they won three awards, Black Eyed Peas performed "Imma Be" and "I Gotta Feeling".

The album cover for The E.N.D. Summer 2010 Canadian Invasion Tour: Remix Collection is a still from the accompanying music video for "Imma Be", and was the group's first cover in five years to feature the members.

In order to globally promote The E.N.D. further, Black Eyed Peas embarked on The E.N.D. World Tour in Hamamatsu, Japan on September 15, 2009. It was the group's biggest tour production-wise, with Fergie stating that they were "trying to up [their] game" and the shows would "utilize a lot of the technology that's out there". The tour was backed by presenting sponsor BlackBerry, while Bacardi served as its "official spirit". In Canada, a remix album titled The E.N.D. Summer 2010 Canadian Invasion Tour: Remix Collection was released on July 27, 2010, via iTunes Store, during the second North American leg of the tour. After a total of 115 shows across Asia, Oceania, North America, Europe and South America, the tour ended on November 13, 2010, in Lima, Peru. In December, the tour placed at number five on Billboard's list "Top 25 Tours of 2010", grossing $81,579,114 for 82 shows, and at number nine on Pollstar's list of top ten North American tours for grossing $50.5 million.

The E.N.D. Summer 2010 Canadian Invasion Tour: Remix Collection
No.	Title	Length
1.	"Rock That Body" (Chris Lake Remix)	5:53
2.	"Boom Boom Pow" (will.i.am Remix)	4:11
3.	"Boom Boom Guetta" (David Guetta Remix)	4:01
4.	"I Gotta Feeling" (David Guetta Remix)	6:11
5.	"I Gotta Feeling" (Printz Board & Zuper Blahq Remix)	5:04
6.	"I Gotta Feeling" (Zuper Blahq Remix)	5:48
7.	"Imma Be" (Wolfgang Gartner Remix)	6:23
8.	"Imma Be" (DJ Ammo & Poet Name Life Remix)	4:41
9.	"Rock That Body" (Skrillex Remix)	5:08
10.	"Rock That Body" (apl.de.ap and DJ Replay Remix for Jeepney Music)	4:41
11.	"Meet Me Halfway in 3D" (will.i.am Remix)	5:39
12.	"Meet Me Halfway" (DJ Ammo & Poet Name Life Remix)	5:25
13.	"Meet Me Halfway, Baby" (Printz Board Remix)	5:21
14.	"Let's Get Re-Started" (will.i.am Remix)	2:57
15.	"Boom Boom Boom" (DJ Ammo & Poet Name Life Remix)	5:47

== Singles ==
"Boom Boom Pow" was released as the lead single from The E.N.D. on February 22, 2009. It peaked atop the US Billboard Hot 100, becoming the group's first number-one single on the chart. The song features a vocal sample from the 1990 song "Reach Out" by British house duo Sweet Mercy featuring singer Rowetta. It stayed atop the chart for 12 consecutive weeks, making it the second longest-running single to stay atop the chart in 2009, after Black Eyed Peas' own "I Gotta Feeling". The song was named "Song of the Year" on the Billboard Hot 100 year-end chart for 2009. On May 18, 2010, the digital single was certified quintuple platinum by the Recording Industry Association of America (RIAA) for selling five million units in the United States. Internationally, it peaked atop the charts in Australia, Belgium, Canada, Croatia, Israel, Portugal and the United Kingdom. At the 52nd Annual Grammy Awards (2010), the song was nominated for Best Dance Recording, but lost to Lady Gaga's "Poker Face". An accompanying music video for the song was directed by Mathew Cullen and Mark Kudsi, and is set in the year 3008; it won Best Short Form Music Video at the 52nd Annual Grammy Awards.

"I Gotta Feeling" was released as the second single from The E.N.D. on June 15, 2009. Debuting at number two, it replaced "Boom Boom Pow" at the summit of the US Billboard Hot 100, making them only the fourth group to replace themselves at number one in the chart's history. The song remained at the top spot for 14 consecutive weeks, being the longest-reigning number-one single on the chart of 2009. On June 6, 2018, the digital single was certified diamond by the RIAA for selling ten million units in the US. Internationally, it peaked atop the charts in 21 countries. Critically acclaimed, the song won Best Pop Performance by a Duo or Group with Vocals at the 52nd Annual Grammy Awards. Its accompanying music video was directed by Mikey Mee and features guest appearances from David Guetta, Kid Cudi, members of the indie rock band Gossip, the designer duo Dean and Dan Caten of Dsquared^{2} and RuPaul's Drag Race alumni Ongina.

Originally released as the third promotional single from The E.N.D. on June 2, 2009, "Meet Me Halfway" was released as its third single on September 22 to critical acclaim. It became the album's third US Billboard Hot 100 top-ten single, peaking at number seven. The digital single was certified double platinum by the RIAA on May 18, 2010, for selling two million units in the US. Internationally, it peaked atop the charts in Australia, Belgium, Germany, Greece, Israel, Luxembourg, Norway, Romania and the United Kingdom. Directed by Ben Mor, the song's accompanying music video features the members in different parts of the Solar System–Fergie lies in the middle of a lush green jungle, apl.de.ap levitates on a desert planet in nomadic clothing, will.i.am rides an elephant on a moon of Jupiter and Taboo glides around the Sun in a spacesuit.

Originally released as the first promotional single from The E.N.D. on May 19, 2009, "Imma Be" was released as the fourth US and fifth and final international single on January 12, 2010, simultaneously with "Rock That Body", to critical acclaim. Following its performance at the 52nd Annual Grammy Awards, the song became Black Eyed Peas' third US Billboard Hot 100 number-one single. The digital single was certified double platinum by the RIAA on May 18. Internationally, the song failed to replicate the commercial success of its predecessors, but peaked within the top ten in Australia, Canada and Hungary. Directed by Rich Lee, the song's accompanying music video was filmed back-to-back with the music video for "Rock That Body". The videos were put together in a ten-minute medley titled "Imma Be Rocking That Body".

"Rock That Body" was released simultaneously with "Imma Be" as the fourth international and fifth and final US single from The E.N.D. on January 29, 2010. It became Black Eyed Peas' fifth consecutive US Billboard Hot 100 top-ten single, peaking at number nine. Internationally, it peaked within the top ten in Australia, Austria, Belgium, France, Germany, Ireland, Israel, Italy and Portugal. Directed by Rich Lee, the song's accompanying music video was filmed back-to-back with the music video for "Imma Be". The videos were put together in a ten-minute medley titled "Imma Be Rocking That Body".

"Alive" was released the second promotional single from The E.N.D. on May 23, 2009, as part of "The Countdown to The E.N.D." "Missing You" was released as the fourth and final promotional single exclusively in France on April 23, 2010. It peaked at number ten on the French airplay chart, and at number 19 on the French digital chart. The March 30 performance of "Missing You" in Los Angeles during The E.N.D. World Tour was filmed and released as the official music video in France. "Showdown" was used in theatre rounds of So You Think You Can Dance Australia, which propelled it to number 66 on the Australian Singles Chart on February 15, 2010. "One Tribe" was used for Pepsi commercials in 2010, and was also included on the album Songs for Japan (2011), released in support of the victims of the 2011 Tōhoku earthquake and tsunami.

== Critical reception ==
Professional ratings
Aggregate scores
Source	Rating
AnyDecentMusic?	6.0/10
Metacritic	60/100
Review scores
Source	Rating
AllMusic	3.5/5 stars
Entertainment Weekly	B
The Guardian	3/5 stars
The Independent	2/5 stars
Los Angeles Times	2.5/4 stars
MSN Music (Consumer Guide)	A
PopMatters	5/10
Rolling Stone	3.5/5 stars
Spin	5/10
USA Today	3.5/4 stars

The E.N.D. received mixed reviews from music critics upon its release. On review aggregator Metacritic, it received an average of 60 out of 100 indicating "mixed or average reviews", based on 15 reviews, which was higher than Monkey Business (2005) but lower than Elephunk (2003), with critics agreeing that the album showcased more of a dance-oriented sound than its predecessors. Entertainment Weekly described the album as "pure Top 40 nirvana", while PopMatters concluded that after listening to the album and "dancing all night [...] you just may not be able to respect yourself in the morning".

Other critical reactions to The E.N.D. were comparatively mixed, with John Bush of AllMusic commenting on Black Eyed Peas' move from hip-hop to pop music by writing: "The Black Eyed Peas make effective pop/crossover music, but with all the limitations of the form – vapid lyrics, clumsy delivery, vocals smoothed over by Auto-Tune, and songwriting that strains for (and reaches) the lowest common denominator." Eric Henderson from Slant Magazine also commented on Black Eyed Peas' change in musical direction, saying: "On the one hand, you have the pre-Fergie band, which delighted the college rock intelligentsia with its bite-sized, pre-chewed imitation of legitimate alternative hip-hop a la A Tribe Called Quest and the Roots... On the other hand, you have the post-Fergie clown troupe, which has traded any and all available credibility in pursuit of becoming (successfully) the most flagrantly commercial pop supergroup since Destiny's Child."

== Accolades ==
Awards and nominations for The E.N.D.
Year	Award	Category	Nominee(s)	Result	Ref.
2009	MuchMusic Video Award	Best International Group Video	"Boom Boom Pow"	Won	
2009	Teen Choice Award	Choice Music – Rap/Hip-Hop Track	"Boom Boom Pow"	Won	
2009	Teen Choice Award	Choice Music – Group Album	The E.N.D.	Nominated	
2009	MTV Europe Music Award	Best Song	"I Gotta Feeling"	Nominated	
2009	American Music Award	Favorite Soul/R&B Album	The E.N.D.	Nominated	
2009	Premios 40 Principales	Best International Song	"I Gotta Feeling"	Won	
2010	NRJ Music Award	International Song of the Year	"I Gotta Feeling"	Won	
2010	NRJ Music Award	International Album of the Year	The E.N.D.	Nominated	
2010	Grammy Award	Album of the Year	The E.N.D.	Nominated	
2010	Grammy Award	Best Pop Vocal Album	The E.N.D.	Won	
2010	Grammy Award	Best Dance Recording	"Boom Boom Pow"	Nominated	
2010	Grammy Award	Best Short Form Music Video	"Boom Boom Pow"	Won	
2010	Grammy Award	Record of the Year	"I Gotta Feeling"	Nominated	
2010	Grammy Award	Best Pop Performance by a Duo or Group with Vocals	"I Gotta Feeling"	Won	
2010	Brit Award	International Album	The E.N.D.	Nominated	
2010	NAACP Image Award	Outstanding Music Video	"Boom Boom Pow"	Nominated	
2010	Nickelodeon Kids' Choice Award	Favorite Song	"I Gotta Feeling"	Nominated	
2010	Juno Award	International Album of the Year	The E.N.D.	Nominated	
2010	World Music Award	World's Best Album	The E.N.D.	Nominated	
2010	World Music Award	World's Best Single	"I Gotta Feeling"	Nominated	
2010	MTV Video Music Award Japan	Best Group Video	"I Gotta Feeling"	Nominated	
2010	MTV Video Music Award Japan	Best Karaokee! Song	"I Gotta Feeling"	Nominated	
2010	MTV Video Music Award Japan	Album of the Year	The E.N.D.	Nominated	
2010	MuchMusic Video Award	Best International Group Video	"I Gotta Feeling"	Nominated	
2011	Billboard Music Award	Top Pop Album	The E.N.D.	Nominated	

== Commercial performance ==
In the United States, The E.N.D. debuted atop the Billboard 200 and Top R&B/Hip-Hop Albums, selling 304,000 copies in its first week. In its second week, its sales decreased by 51 percent to 148,000 copies, and the album descended to number two on the Billboard 200, while remaining atop the Top R&B/Hip-Hop Albums. The following week, it returned to the summit of the Billboard 200, despite its sales declining to 88,000 copies. The album has spent 38 weeks within the top ten on the Billboard 200 and a total of 114 weeks on the chart. It was the seventh best-selling album of 2009 in the country, selling 1.79 million copies throughout the year. On March 30, 2010, it was certified double platinum by the Recording Industry Association of America (RIAA). By March 2011, the album had sold over three million copies in the US. In Canada, the album debuted atop the Canadian Albums Chart, on which it has spent a total of 66 weeks. It was certified quintuple platinum by the Canadian Recording Industry Association (CRIA). In Mexico, it debuted at number ten on the Top 100 Mexico, peaking at number seven and charting for 91 weeks. On December 17, 2010, it was certified platinum by the Asociación Mexicana de Productores de Fonogramas y Videogramas (AMPROFON).

In the United Kingdom, The E.N.D. debuted and peaked at number three the UK Album Charts, spending eight non-consecutive weeks at the position. Additionally, it debuted atop the UK R&B Albums Chart and peaked at number two on the Scottish Albums Chart. The album was certified quintuple platinum by the British Phonographic Industry (BPI) on July 22, 2013. In France, it debuted at number two and peaked atop the chart in its second week, spending 11 non-consecutive weeks at the summit and 58 weeks within the top ten. The album has been certified diamond by the Syndicat National de l'Édition Phonographique (SNEP). Across Europe, it peaked atop the charts in Portugal, Wallonia and the European Top 100 Albums, while reaching the top ten in Austria, Denmark, Flanders, Germany, Greece, Hungary, Ireland, Italy, Netherlands, Poland, Spain and Switzerland. International Federation of the Phonographic Industry (IFPI) certified it triple platinum in 2010, for sales of three million copies across Europe.

The E.N.D. fared similarly across Oceania and Asia. In Australia, it debuted atop the ARIA Top 100 Albums, spending three non-consecutive weeks at the summit and a total of 55 weeks on the chart. On December 24, 2009, it was certified quadruple platinum by the Australian Recording Industry Association (ARIA). In New Zealand, the album debuted at number two, reaching the summit in its ninth week and staying there for four non-consecutive weeks. It was certified double platinum by the Recording Industry Association of New Zealand (RIANZ) in 2010. In Japan, the album peaked at number two on the Oricon Albums Chart, on which it has spent a total of 58 weeks. It was certified platinum by the Recording Industry Association of Japan (RIAJ) in 2010. The E.N.D. was the second best-selling album worldwide of 2009, and went on to sell over 11 million copies by November 2010.

== Controversy ==
Much like its predecessors Elephunk (2003) and Monkey Business (2005), The E.N.D. and its tracks were subjects of controversy. Since the release of Elephunk, Black Eyed Peas had been targeted by music critics and media outlets for selling out. The accusations intensified following the partnership the group formed with the Target Corporation, whose stores would exclusively sell the deluxe edition of the album, while Black Eyed Peas would appear in Target's television advertisement performing their then-new single "I Gotta Feeling". Writing for Slate, advertising critic Seth Stevenson was extremely deprecatory of the partnership, branding the commercial "an abomination" and the group "a bunch of sellouts". In addition, the Government of Malaysia initially banned Malaysia's Muslim citizens from attending the Black Eyed Peas' September 25, 2009 concert near Kuala Lumpur, which was organized both to promote The E.N.D. and as part of a global promotion by Guinness, celebrating the 250th anniversary of its flagship Dublin brewery; however, the ban was soon reversed.

Multiple songs from The E.N.D. were subjects of plagiarism disputes and copyright infringement lawsuits. In July 2009, English record producer Adam Freeland accused Black Eyed Peas of plagiarizing the beat from his song "Mancry" on the track "Party All the Time". However, a settlement was later reached out of court. In January 2010, American recording artist Phoenix Phenom and producer Manfred Mohr filed a copyright infringement lawsuit against the group, claiming "Boom Boom Pow" was "virtually identical" to their song "Boom Dynamite", which Phenom had previously submitted to Interscope Records executives. In October, Black Eyed Peas were sued for copyright infringement again, by American songwriter Bryan Pringle. Both cases were eventually won by Black Eyed Peas as the judges ruled that the songs were not similar enough.

== Track listing ==
The E.N.D.
No.	Title	Writer(s)	Producer(s)	Length
1.	"Boom Boom Pow"	William Adams; Allan Pineda; Jaime Gomez; Stacy Ferguson	will.i.am; Jean Baptiste^{[a]}; Poet Name Life^{[a]}	5:08
2.	"Rock That Body"	Adams; Pineda; Gomez; Ferguson; David Guetta; Mark Knight; Adam Walder; Baptiste; Jaime L. Munson; Robert Ginyard, Jr.	Guetta; will.i.am; Knight^{[a]}; Funkagenda^{[a]}	4:29
3.	"Meet Me Halfway"	Adams; Pineda; Gomez; Ferguson; Keith Harris; Baptiste; Sylvia Gordon	Harris; will.i.am	4:44
4.	"Imma Be"	Adams; Pineda; Gomez; Ferguson; Harris; Jared Tankel; Daniel Foder; Thomas Brenneck; Michael Deller	Harris; will.i.am	4:16
5.	"I Gotta Feeling"	Adams; Pineda; Gomez; Ferguson; Guetta; Frédéric Riesterer	Guetta; Riesterer^{[a]}	4:49
6.	"Alive"	Adams; Pineda; Gomez; Ferguson; Baptiste	will.i.am	5:03
7.	"Missing You"	Adams; Pineda; Gomez; Ferguson; Printz Board; Baptiste	Board; will.i.am	4:35
8.	"Ring-A-Ling"	Adams; Pineda; Gomez; Ferguson; Harris	Harris	4:33
9.	"Party All the Time"	Adams; Pineda; Gomez; Ferguson	will.i.am	4:44
10.	"Out of My Head"	Adams; Pineda; Gomez; Ferguson; Board; Harris; George Pajon; Tim "Izo" Orindgreff	Board; will.i.am	3:52
11.	"Electric City"	Adams; Pineda; Gomez; Ferguson; Bert Berns; Robert Feldman; Gerald Goldstein; Richard Gottehrer	will.i.am	4:08
12.	"Showdown"	Adams; Pineda; Gomez; Ferguson; Ryan Buendia	apl.de.ap; DJ Replay	4:27
13.	"Now Generation"	Adams; Pineda; Gomez; Ferguson; Pajon; Orindgreff	will.i.am	4:06
14.	"One Tribe"	Adams; Pineda; Gomez; Ferguson; Board	will.i.am	4:41
15.	"Rockin to the Beat"	Adams; Pineda; Gomez; Ferguson; Board; Pajon	will.i.am	3:45

Deluxe edition bonus disc
No.	Title	Writer(s)	Producer(s)	Length
1.	"Where Ya Wanna Go"	Adams; Pineda; Gomez; Ferguson; Pajon; Board; Harris; Orindgreff	will.i.am; Bucky Jonson	5:08
2.	"Simple Little Melody"	Adams; Pineda; Gomez; Ferguson; Baptiste; Alexander Ridha	Boys Noize	3:12
3.	"Mare"	Adams; Pineda; Gomez; Ferguson; Buendia; A. R. Rahman	apl.de.ap; DJ Replay	2:55
4.	"Don't Bring Me Down"	Adams; Pineda; Gomez; Ferguson; Buendia	apl.de.ap; DJ Replay	3:11
5.	"Pump It Harder"	Adams; Pineda; Ferguson; Thomas Van Musser; Nicholas Roubanis; James Brown	will.i.am	3:52
6.	"Let's Get Re-Started"	Adams; Pineda; Gomez; Terence Yoshiaki; Michael Fratantuno; Pajon	will.i.am; Mark "Spike" Stent	2:57
7.	"Shut the Phunk Up"	Adams; Gomez; Pajon; Philippe Wynne	will.i.am	4:19
8.	"That's the Joint"	Gomez; Paul Poli; Pineda; Barry Gibb; Adams; Greg Phillinganes; Trevor Smith; Malik Taylor; Kamaal Fareed; Ali Shaheed Muhammad	Poli; will.i.am	3:48
9.	"Another Weekend"	Adams; Pineda; Gomez; Tony Butler; Sylvester Stewart	will.i.am	4:10
10.	"Don't Phunk Around"	Ferguson; Kalyanji Anandji; Indeewar; Adams; Board; Pajon; Brian P George; Curtis T. Bedeau; Gerard Charles; Hugh Clarke; Paul A. George; Lucien George Jr.; Cleveland Bell; Victor May	will.i.am	3:47

=== Notes ===
- ^{^a} signifies a co-producer
- On digital editions, "Boom Boom Pow" excludes will.i.am's minute-long intro, instead using the single version.
- "Mare" also appeared on international standard edition pressings.
- "Simple Little Melody" also appeared on Japanese standard and limited edition pressings, alongside "Mare".
- Select digital editions include Boys Noize's megamix "Let the Beat Rock", featuring 50 Cent, and David Guetta's Electro Hop Remix of "Boom Boom Pow".
- On the iTunes Store and Apple Music, the deluxe edition includes a bonus 30-minute video.
- Japanese limited edition pressings include a bonus DVD containing the music video for "Boom Boom Pow" and its accompanying behind-the-scenes footage.
- French limited edition pressings include a bonus disc containing the 10 deluxe edition tracks alongside David Guetta's Electro Hop and FMIF remixes of "Boom Boom Pow" and "I Gotta Feeling", respectively.

Sample credits

- "Rock That Body" contains a sample from "It Takes Two", as performed by Rob Base & DJ EZ Rock, which in turn samples "Think (About It)", as performed by Lyn Collins.
- "Imma Be" contains a sample of "Ride or Die", as performed by the Budos Band.
- "Electric City" contains excerpts from "I Want Candy", as performed by Bow Wow Wow.
- "Mare" contains a sample of "Hai Rama", written by A. R. Rahman.

== Personnel ==
Credits are adapted from the liner notes of The E.N.D.

- Kathy Angstadt – Interscope video commissioning
- apl.de.ap – production (tracks 12 and 16), songwriting (all tracks), vocals
- Eddie Axley – logo design
- Jean Baptiste – additional A&R coordination, co-production (track 1), keys (track 7), songwriting (tracks 2, 3, 6 and 7), synthesizers (track 7)
- Chris Bellman – mastering
- Bert Berns – songwriting (track 11)
- Printz Board – drum programming (track 10), keys (track 15), production (tracks 7 and 10), songwriting (tracks 7, 10, 14 and 15), synth bass (track 3), synthesizer (track 10)
- Thomas Brenneck – songwriting (track 4)
- Brian "BC" Catena – mastering assistance
- Mathew Cullen – art direction
- Dimitri Daniloff – photography
- Michael Deller – songwriting (track 4)
- Dennis Dennehy – public relations
- William Derella – management
- DJ Replay – production (tracks 12 and 16), songwriting (track 12)
- Todd Douglas – Interscope legal
- Dylan Dresdow – mixing
- Robert Feldman – songwriting (track 11)
- Fergie – songwriting (all tracks), vocals
- Daniel Foder – songwriting (track 4)
- Funkagenda – co-production (track 2)
- Robert Ginyard Jr. – songwriting (track 2)
- Fred Goldring – legal representation
- Gerald Goldstein – songwriting (track 11)
- Sylvia Gordon – songwriting (track 3)
- Richard Gottehrer – songwriting (track 11)
- David Guetta – production (tracks 2 and 5), songwriting (tracks 2 and 5)
- Keith Harris – bass guitar (tracks 3 and 13), drum programming (tracks 3 and 8), drums (track 10), keys (tracks 3 and 8), percussion (track 10), production (tracks 3, 4 and 8), songwriting (tracks 3, 4, 8 and 10), synthesizers (tracks 3 and 8)
- Julie Hovsepian – product management
- Neil Jacobson – additional A&R coordination
- Padraic "Padlock" Kerin – engineering (all tracks), production coordination, recording (all tracks)
- Mark Knight – co-production (track 2), keyboards (track 2), songwriting (track 2)
- Mark Kudsi – art direction
- Sean Larkin – business management
- Josh Lopez – guitar (track 6)
- Deborah Mannis-Gardner – sample clearance
- Craig Marshall – Interscope legal
- Polo Molina – additional production coordination, management
- Tim "Izo" Orindgreff – acoustic guitar (track 13), guitar (track 3), harmonica (track 13), horns (track 10), songwriting (tracks 10 and 13)
- George Pajon – guitar (tracks 3, 7 and 13–15), songwriting (tracks 10, 13 and 15)
- Joe Peluso – mixing assistance
- Poet Name Life – co-production (track 1), songwriting (track 2)
- A. R. Rahman – songwriting (track 16)
- Frederic Riesterer – production (track 5), songwriting (track 5)
- Hal Ritson – additional guitar (track 2), additional keyboards (track 2), backing vocals (track 2)
- Rachel Rosoff – additional production coordination, legal representation
- Dante Santiago – creative A&R, logo design
- Hillary Siskind – public relations
- David Sonenberg – management
- Caleb Speir – bass (tracks 6, 10 and 14)
- Taboo – songwriting (all tracks), vocals
- Jared Tankel – songwriting (track 4)
- Adam Walder – keyboards (track 2), songwriting (track 2)
- Andrew Van Meter – Interscope production
- will.i.am – arrangement (tracks 2, 8 and 12), art direction, drum programming (tracks 1, 7, 9–11, 13 and 15), engineering (all tracks), executive production, keys (track 13), piano (track 6), production (tracks 1–4, 6, 7, 9–11 and 13–15), recording (all tracks), songwriting (all tracks), synthesizers (tracks 1, 5–7, 9, 11, 13 and 15), vocals
- Ianthe Zevos – Interscope creative

== Charts ==
=== Weekly charts ===
2009–2010 weekly chart performance
Chart	Peak position
Australian Albums (ARIA)	1
Austrian Albums (Ö3 Austria)	5
Belgian Albums (Ultratop Flanders)	3
Belgian Albums (Ultratop Wallonia)	1
Canadian Albums (Billboard)	1
Danish Albums (Hitlisten)	5
Dutch Albums (Album Top 100)	8
European Top 100 Albums (Billboard)	1
Finnish Albums (Suomen virallinen lista)	17
French Albums (SNEP)	1
German Albums (Offizielle Top 100)	2
Greek Albums (IFPI)	7
Hungarian Albums (MAHASZ)	10
Irish Albums (IRMA)	3
Italian Albums (FIMI)	8
Japanese Albums (Oricon)	2
Mexican Albums (Top 100 Mexico)	7
New Zealand Albums (RMNZ)	1
Norwegian Albums (VG-lista)	28
Polish Albums (ZPAV)	7
Portuguese Albums (AFP)	1
Scottish Albums (Official Charts)	2
South African Albums (RISA)	5
Spanish Albums (Promusicae)	7
Swedish Albums (Sverigetopplistan)	18
Swiss Albums (Schweizer Hitparade)	2
UK Albums (Official Charts)	3
UK R&B Albums (Official Charts)	1
US Billboard 200	1
US Top R&B/Hip-Hop Albums (Billboard)	1

2025–2026 weekly chart performance
Chart	Peak position
German Pop Albums (Offizielle Top 100)	20
Hungarian Albums (MAHASZ)	30
Portuguese Albums (AFP)	29

=== Year-end charts ===
2009 year-end chart performance
Chart	Position
Australian Albums (ARIA)	3
Austrian Albums (Ö3 Austria)	27
Belgian Albums (Ultratop Flanders)	22
Belgian Albums (Ultratop Wallonia)	16
Canadian Albums (Billboard)	4
Dutch Albums (Album Top 100)	34
European Top 100 Albums (Billboard)	8
French Albums (SNEP)	6
German Albums (Offizielle Top 100)	28
Hungarian Albums (MAHASZ)	78
Irish Albums (IRMA)	6
Italian Albums (FIMI)	53
Japanese Albums (Oricon)	33
Mexican Albums (Top 100 Mexico)	16
New Zealand Albums (RMNZ)	5
Polish Albums (ZPAV)	75
Swiss Albums (Schweizer Hitparade)	15
UK Albums (OCC)	4
US Billboard 200	10
US Top R&B/Hip-Hop Albums (Billboard)	17
Worldwide Albums (IFPI)	2

2010 year-end chart performance
Chart	Position
Australian Albums (ARIA)	26
Austrian Albums (Ö3 Austria)	69
Belgian Albums (Ultratop Flanders)	3
Belgian Albums (Ultratop Wallonia)	3
Canadian Albums (Billboard)	6
Danish Albums (Hitlisten)	68
Dutch Albums (Album Top 100)	47
European Top 100 Albums (Billboard)	2
French Albums (SNEP)	7
German Albums (Offizielle Top 100)	93
Irish Albums (IRMA)	20
Italian Albums (FIMI)	30
Mexican Albums (Top 100 Mexico)	16
New Zealand Albums (RMNZ)	49
Spanish Albums (PROMUSICAE)	17
Swedish Albums (Sverigetopplistan)	79
Swiss Albums (Schweizer Hitparade)	11
UK Albums (OCC)	23
US Billboard 200	10
US Top R&B/Hip-Hop Albums (Billboard)	2
Worldwide Albums (IFPI)	13

2011 year-end chart performance
Chart	Position
UK Albums (OCC)	185
US Billboard 200	114

2025 year-end chart performance
Chart	Position
Belgian Albums (Ultratop Flanders)	139
German Albums (Offizielle Top 100)	86
Swedish Albums (Sverigetopplistan)	96
US Top R&B/Hip-Hop Albums (Billboard)	87

=== Decade-end charts ===
2000s decade-end chart performance
Chart	Position
Australian Albums (ARIA)	84

2010s decade-end chart performance
Chart	Position
US Billboard 200	77

== Certifications ==
Certifications and sales
Region	Certification	Certified units/sales
Australia (ARIA)	4× Platinum	280,000^{^}
Belgium (BRMA)	3× Platinum	90,000^{*}
Brazil (Pro-Música Brasil)	Platinum	60,000^{*}
Canada (Music Canada)	5× Platinum	400,000^{^}
Denmark (IFPI Danmark)	2× Platinum	40,000^{‡}
France (SNEP)	Diamond	700,000
Germany (BVMI)	2× Platinum	400,000^{^}
Ireland (IRMA)	4× Platinum	60,000^{^}
Italy (FIMI)	2× Platinum	100,000^{*}
Japan (RIAJ)	Platinum	250,000^{^}
Lebanon (IFPI Middle East)	Gold	1,000
Mexico (AMPROFON)	Platinum	80,000^{^}
New Zealand (RMNZ)	5× Platinum	75,000^{‡}
Poland (ZPAV)	Platinum	20,000^{*}
Portugal (AFP)	Platinum	20,000^{^}
Russia (NFPF)	Gold	10,000^{*}
Singapore (RIAS)	Platinum	10,000^{*}
Spain (Promusicae)	Platinum	80,000^{^}
Switzerland (IFPI Switzerland)	2× Platinum	60,000^{^}
United Kingdom (BPI)	5× Platinum	1,500,000^{^}
United States (RIAA)	6× Platinum	6,000,000^{‡}
Summaries
Europe (IFPI)	3× Platinum	3,000,000^{*}
Worldwide	—	11,000,000
^{*} Sales figures based on certification alone.^{^} Shipments figures based on certification alone.^{‡} Sales+streaming figures based on certification alone.

== Release history ==
Release dates and formats
Region	Date	Edition(s)	Format(s)	Label(s)	Ref.
Japan	June 3, 2009	Standard; limited	CD; CD+DVD	Universal	
Denmark	June 4, 2009	Standard	CD	Universal	
Germany	June 5, 2009	Standard; deluxe	CD; double CD	Universal	
Poland	June 5, 2009	Standard	CD	Universal	
Australia	June 8, 2009	Standard	CD	Universal	
France	June 8, 2009	Standard	CD	Polydor	
United Kingdom	June 8, 2009	Standard; deluxe	CD; double CD	Polydor	
Canada	June 9, 2009	Standard; deluxe	CD; double CD	Universal	
France	June 9, 2009	Deluxe	Double CD	Polydor	
United States	June 9, 2009	Standard; deluxe (Note: In the United States, the deluxe edition of The E.N.D. was released exclusively for Target and the iTunes Store. It was later made available on streaming platforms.)	CD; double CD; digital download	Interscope	
United States	June 16, 2009	Standard	Vinyl	Interscope	
Germany	June 23, 2009	Standard	Vinyl	Universal	
Japan	September 9, 2009	Deluxe	Double CD	Universal	
France	December 7, 2009	Limited	Double CD	Polydor	

== See also ==
- Black Eyed Peas discography
- List of Billboard 200 number-one albums of 2009
- List of Billboard number-one R&B/hip-hop albums of 2009
- List of number-one albums of 2009 (Australia)
- List of number-one albums of 2009 (Canada)
- List of number-one hits of 2009 (France)
- List of number-one albums from the 2000s (New Zealand)
- List of number-one albums of 2009 (Portugal)
- List of UK R&B Albums Chart number ones of 2009
- Grammy Award for Best Pop Vocal Album
