= Dipdive =

Social network

- Dipdive homepage on May 28, 2009.
- Website type: Social networking
- Available in: English
- Owner: Dipdive Inc.
- Website: http://dipdive.com/ (defunct; redirects to http://will.i.am/)
- Registration: Yes
- Launched: October 1, 2007
- Current status: Defunct (since 2013)

Dipdive was a social networking website created by will.i.am. It is best known as the original source site of the 'Yes We Can' music video. The site allowed users to upload images, videos and audio files, post blog entries and create playlists. Dipdive was home to a variety of creative content and information on social causes.

The website was shut down at some time in 2013 and its domain was redirected to will.i.am's homepage. When asked about it in an interview with Fortune, will.i.am responded with "Ehh, I don’t want to do it anymore. I have something else I’m doing", insisting that "Dipdive wasn’t a failure" as the source code could potentially be reused in the future.

== History ==
The site launched in an early Beta state when will.i.am launched the Barack Obama U.S. presidential election anthem video for 'Yes We Can' on February 2, 2008 and the video for We Are the Ones on February 29, 2008. 'It's a New Day' was subsequently uploaded to the site. The official launch of the full feature site was October 15, 2008 when Dipdive.com launched along with the UK release of will.i.am's third studio album, Songs About Girls. The site was created and is maintained by Dipdive LLC.

On February 22, 2009, will.i.am uploaded the full version of the previously-leaked 'Boom Boom Pow' (which would become a #1 hit) to the website and revealed that the Black Eyed Peas' official website would redirect to the new Black Eyed Peas channel on Dipdive. Almost a year after will.i.am's last song for Barack Obama, he posted a song along with a blog on his profile about his opinion of Obama's reaction to Kanye West's controversy of Taylor Swift. The song was entitled 'The Jackass Song'.

== Profiles ==
Each user had a profile page with a blog, media player and photo album. Users could choose a theme to personalize their profile, and subscribe to their favorite Dipdive Channels. A list of media (audio, video, pictures) added by the user's favorite Channels and friends was displayed in their profile. Users could befriend other Dipdive users and send private messages and webcam recordings. Users could opt to get notifications of content updates from their subscribed Channels and friends. Users could comment on content throughout the website.

=== Importing from other websites ===
After it was said that the Black Eyed Peas website would be closing, Dipdive allowed members to import their blogs, pictures and comments (from Dipdive members who had also imported data) from the Black Eyed Peas website.

Dipdive allowed users to show their latest Facebook status and Twitter 'tweet' on the "What's Up?" section of their profile and log in with their Facebook or Twitter credentials.

=== Channels ===
Channels were pages specially featured on Dipdive with their own themes. They had 'fans' who added them to their favorite channels. Some Channels included forums. There were once 42 channels on Dipdive, some of them belonging to The Black Eyed Peas, Kero One, Natalia Kills K'Naan and Kimberly Wyatt, former member of the Pussycat Dolls.

== On mobile phones ==
Dipdive was sponsored by BlackBerry and its mobile application was only available for BlackBerry OS. The application required a microSD card to play video.

However, the Dipdive mobile website could be accessed on other mobile phones.

== Exclusive to Dipdive ==
Some Channels and web series were featured exclusively on Dipdive.

=== DailyDips ===
The DailyDips Channel hosted a news web series. Each episode contained 2-5 headlines of events (originally 7); they were formerly often made to be humorous. It was originally hosted by Michelle Joan Papillion and then hosted by various hosts including Raquelle Gracie, a former member of the girl group, Hope who auditioned for the fourth series of The X Factor. In 2010, DailyDips introduced a new format with a different topic each day of the week: DipComedy Monday, New Music Tuesday, Fashion, Art & Philanthropy Wednesday, Sporting Thursday and Feature Film Friday. Several new hosts covered different days or multiple days, including Lilan, Vanessa, Rana, Milan and Michelle. In 2011, a new host joined the roster: Corey Conrad.

=== Shrink Rap ===
Shrink Rap was a web series where the host asked celebrity and artist guests to guess what a certain image was. It launched on the DailyDips (formerly DipApproved) Channel.

=== Dippin on the Streets ===
Dippin on the Streets was a web series where the hosts attended events and festivals. It launched on the DailyDips (formerly DipApproved) Channel and on the DipComedy Channel.

=== Beautiful Movements ===
Beautiful Movements was a Dipdive Channel founded by Kimberly Wyatt; it was redirected from 'beautifulmovements.com'. Wyatt stated, "www.beautifulmovements.com is a place for self-expression where people listen, relate, and learn about self worth. Together we encourage growth through love, compassion, and positive action. Through poetry, song, art, dance, and ultimately being self-expressed we open ourselves to a world of possibilities. Nobody on this Earth can make you happy but yourself. So dive into a journey of self-discovery and be the change you wish to see in the world." The channel included a forum.

=== Worlds on Fire ===
Worlds on Fire was an art exhibition that took place from February 2 to February 9, 2009. The gallery featured portraits of 2009 Grammy nominees drawn by Lowbrow pop surrealism artists. After the event finished, the art, along with video footage including interviews with various celebrities, was uploaded to the 'Worlds on Fire' Dipdive Channel.

=== Who Killed the Music? ===
Who Killed the Music was another Dipdive-sponsored art exhibition that took place at The Grammy Museum in Los Angeles on 24 January 2010. Money was raised for the Grammy Foundation and will.i.am's i.am Scholarship Fund. A number of pop artists created original paintings with their interpretations of the cause of why the music industry was dying or who was 'killing it' (excelling despite the industry's downturn). The art was on display at the exhibition and on Dipdive.

== In other media ==
- The Dipdive homepage is seen on portable devices in The Black Eyed Peas music video for 'I Gotta Feeling'.
- Lyrics in 'Now Generation' by The Black Eyed Peas make a reference to Dipdive.
- A video interface screen from Dipdive is seen in the beginning of will.i.am's music video for 'It's a New Day'.
- A video promoting Dipdive and will.i.am's music was preloaded on BlackBerry smartphones around 2010.
