= Apl.de.ap =

Filipino musician (born 1974)

apl.de.ap
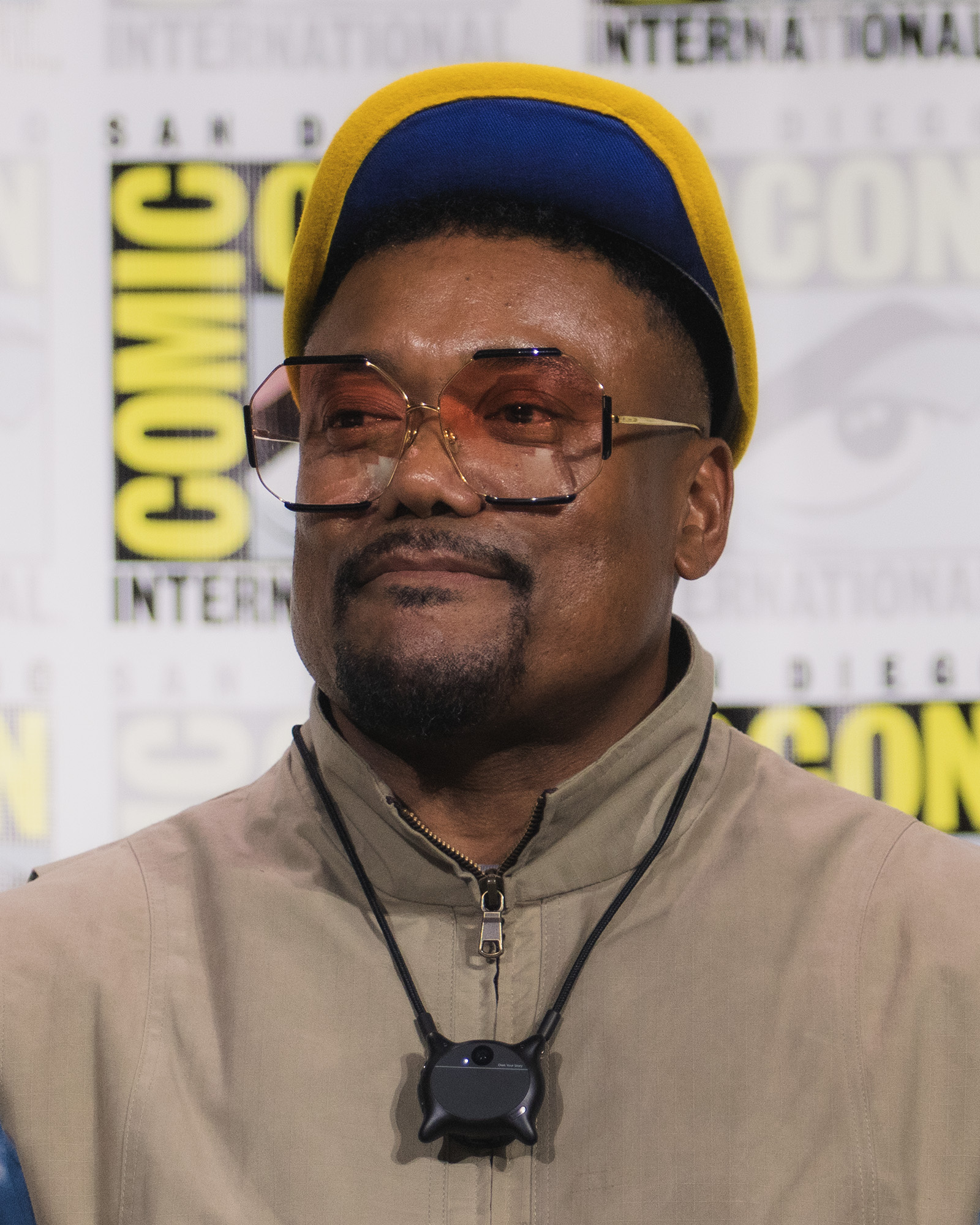
- apl.de.ap in 2026

Background information
- Born: Allan Pineda Lindo; November 28, 1974 (age 51); Angeles City, Pampanga, Philippines
- Origin: Los Angeles, California, U.S.
- Genres: Hip hop; alternative hip-hop; hip house; electro
- Occupations: Rapper; singer; record producer
- Years active: 1988–present
- Labels: BMBX Entertainment; GMA
- Member of: Black Eyed Peas
- Website: www.apldeap.com
- Television: The Voice of the Philippines

Allan Pineda Lindo (born November 28, 1974), known professionally as Apl.de.ap (pronounced IPA: /ˌæpəldiˈæp/ AP-əl-dee-AP and stylized in all lowercase), is a Filipino musician based in Los Angeles, California. He is a founding member of the hip hop group Black Eyed Peas. With them, he has been nominated for 16 Grammy Awards; the band won six awards, including Best Pop Vocal Album.

== Early life ==
Allan Pineda Lindo was born in Angeles City, Philippines. His African American father, an airman stationed at Clark Air Base, left the family shortly after his birth. His Filipino mother, Cristina Pineda, remarried and had six more children. As a child, Pineda would make an hour-long jeepney trip to and from his school and helped his family subsist by farming sweet potatoes, corn, sugar cane and rice. The Pearl S. Buck Foundation, an organization that finds healthier living environments for young, abandoned, or orphaned American children, matched him with a sponsor named Joe Ben Hudgens, a lawyer, through a dollar-a-day program.

Allan initially came to the US at age 11 for treatment for nystagmus, an involuntary movement of the eyes. After a trip to Disneyland, Pineda expressed his interest in residing in the US. It would take another three years for Hudgens to officially adopt him; however, at age 14, he relocated and resided with them.

In Los Angeles, California, Pineda attended John Marshall High School, where he met and befriended William Adams (stage name will.i.am), the nephew of Hudgens' roommate.

Pineda's early musical influences came from his mother who listened to Stevie Wonder, the Eagles, the Beatles, and the Filipino rock/folk group Asin. Pineda was introduced to hip hop and break dancing by watching urban kids in Angeles City: "I would see kids at the corner break-dancing and I'm like, 'I wanna do that.'" Pineda revealed to People magazine in 2011 that he is legally blind in both eyes, as he has continued to suffer from nystagmus. His vision was corrected in 2012.

He has lost two of his siblings: his younger brother Arnel died by suicide (this is referenced in "The Apl Song" in the lines "I guess sometimes life's stresses get you down on your knees/Oh brother, wish I could have helped you out"). His youngest brother, Joven Pineda Deala, was murdered at age 22 in February 2009 in Porac, Pampanga.

== Musical career ==
=== 1988–2000: Formations and the Black Eyed Peas ===
The Black Eyed Peas date back to 1988, when eighth-graders will.i.am and apl.de.ap met and began rapping and performing together around Los Angeles. The pair signed to Ruthless Records (run by Eazy-E) in 1992, catching the attention of Eazy-E manager Jerry Heller's nephew. Along with another friend of theirs, Dante Santiago, they called their trio Atban Klann (ATBAN: A Tribe Beyond a Nation). Will 1X (aka will.i.am), apl.de.ap, Mookie Mook, DJ Motiv8 (aka Monroe Walker) and Dante Santiago formed Atban Klann. Their debut album, Grass Roots, was never released because Ruthless founder Eazy-E had died.

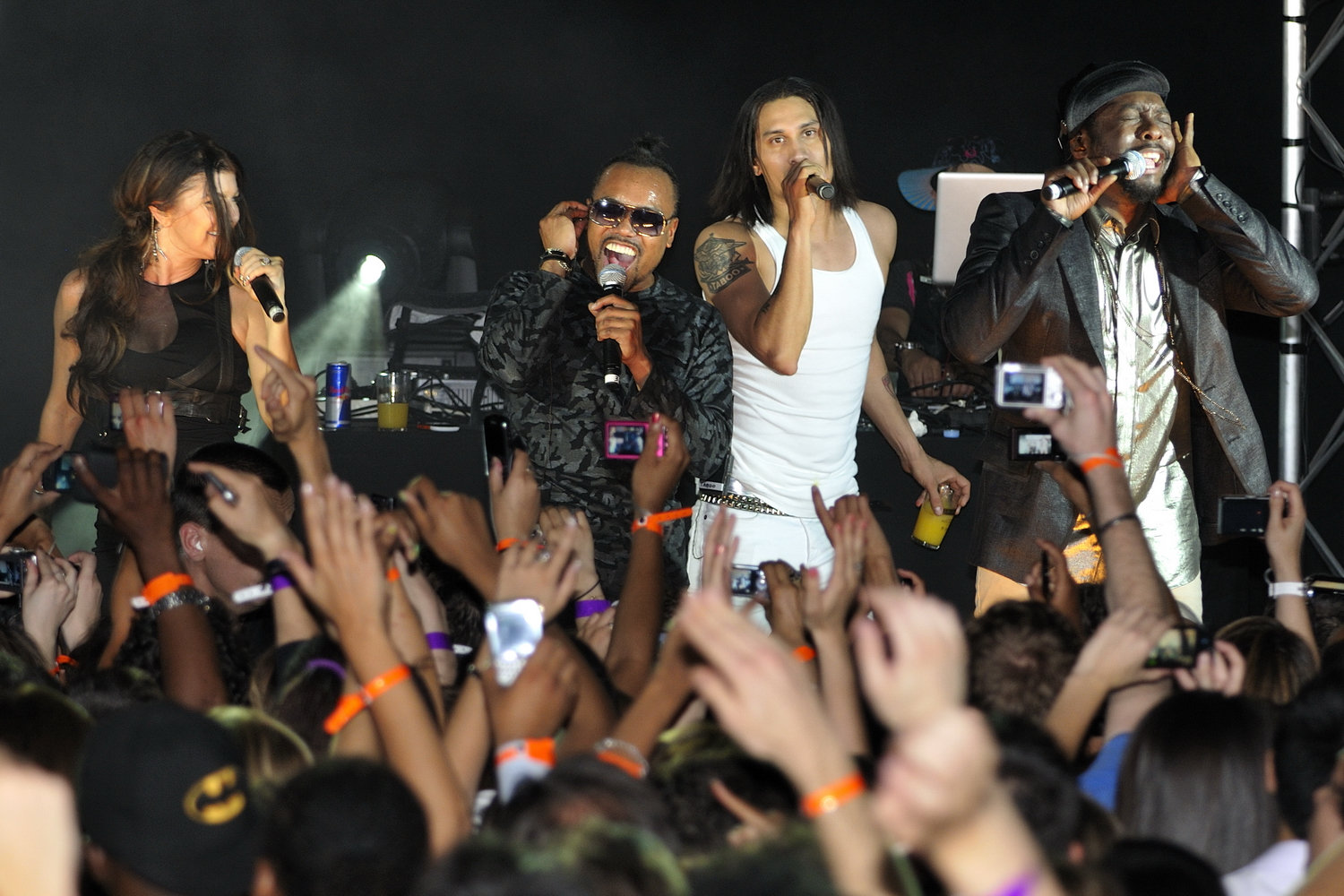
The Black Eyed Peas in Paris during The E.N.D. Tour

After Eazy-E died in 1995, Atban Klann reformed and changed their name to Black Eyed Pods, and then Black Eyed Peas. Dante Santiago was replaced with Taboo, and Kim Hill became a steady background singer. Unlike many hip hop acts, they chose to perform with a live band and adopted a musical and clothing style that differed wildly from the gangsta rap sounds of Los Angeles-based hip hop acts at the time. After being signed to Interscope Records and releasing their debut, Behind the Front (1998) the group (and their accompanying live band) earned critical acclaim. One of the singles from the album was "Joints & Jam", and was featured on the Bulworth soundtrack. Their second album was Bridging the Gap (2000), which included the single "Request + Line" featuring Macy Gray.

=== 2000–2003: Elephunk ===
In November 2001, work began on a third Black Eyed Peas album, Elephunk. Development of the album began on November 2, 2001, and was released just under two years later in 2003. At the time of development, only will.i.am, apl.de.ap and Taboo were to feature on the album. During the production of "Shut Up" (the second single released from the album), they realized that a female vocal would work well with the song. Originally, Nicole Scherzinger (lead singer of the Pussycat Dolls) was approached to make a guest appearance on the record. She was forced to decline because she was already signed to a contract with Eden's Crush. Danté Santiago then introduced Fergie to Will who was impressed with her vocal talents. She immediately formed a bond with the band and became a permanent member of the Peas and her photo was printed onto the album cover. In the United States, Elephunk reached number 14 on the Billboard Top 200 and is their first album to chart in the top 15. It gained even more commercial success on the UK Albums Chart where it reached number 3. It has sold over 1.6 million copies in the UK and 8.5 million copies worldwide. The singles "Where Is the Love?" and "Shut Up" reached number 1. "Hey Mama" has been used for several advertisements, including for Apple and iTunes. "Let's Get It Started" also received acclaim in the media, and a cover version of the song appears in the film Hot Tub Time Machine. After the success of Elephunk, the Peas were approached by Electronic Arts to feature some of their music in the 2004 game The Urbz. They remixed some of the tracks on Elephunk, and translated the lyrics into Simlish; the band also created new tracks for the game. They also feature in the game as playable characters.

The group released their breakthrough single, "Where Is the Love?", in November 2002. The single featured Justin Timberlake, although he did not appear in the video. On the strength of that single and follow-up singles like "Shut Up", Elephunk went on to sell 8.5 million copies worldwide.

=== 2003–2006: Monkey Business ===
In November 2003, work began on a fourth Black Eyed Peas album, entitled Monkey Business; it was second album with new band member Fergie. Upon the success of Monkey Business, which was released in 2005, the album was certified three times Platinum by the RIAA in the U.S. and has sold over 10 million copies worldwide. The Canadian Recording Industry Association (or CRIA) has certified Monkey Business 6× Platinum, with sales of over 600,000 copies. The Australian Recording Industry Association (or ARIA) has also certified Monkey Business 6× Platinum, denoting sales of over 420,000 copies. The album's tracks earned the group four 2006 Grammy Award nominations and they also won the Grammy for Best Rap Performance by a Duo or Group for "Don't Phunk with My Heart". According to IFPI, over 2 million copies have been sold in Europe. In the UK alone, it has sold over 1 million copies, although this is significantly lower than their sales of Elephunk, which stand at over 1.6 million copies and 10 million worldwide. The band announced they were going to take a break to focus on their own personal projects.

=== 2009–2011: Continuation with the Black Eyed Peas with second hiatus ===
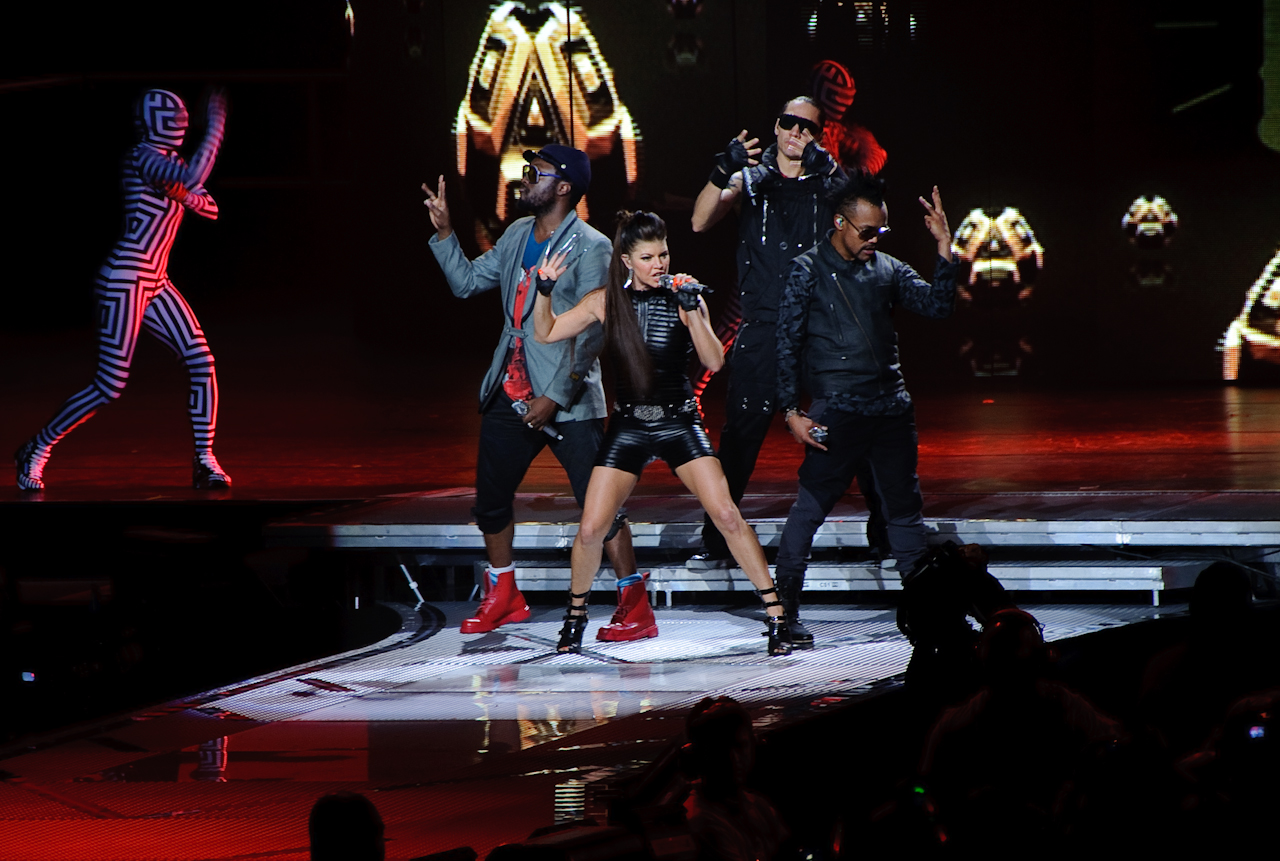
The Black Eyed Peas performing on October 7, 2009

In early 2009, both Fergie and the group left A&M Records for unknown reasons. Both Fergie and the group are still with Interscope Records.

The group's fifth studio album, The E.N.D. ("The Energy Never Dies"), was released on June 9, 2009. The overall sound of the album has a more electro hop beat rather than the usual hip hop/R&B feeling of their previous albums. Following its release, will.i.am remarked that the album had been inspired by a trip to Australia, specifically the sound of The Presets' "My People". "The energy on the Presets' small little stage was crazy energy. That song My People – that shit is wild," will.i.am said, "That's the reason why this record sounds the way it does – my three months in Australia." In its first week, the album sold 304,000 copies and debuted at number 1 on the Billboard 200. In the United States, the album became the ninth album to top the one million mark in sales in 2009. The album spent 38 weeks within the top 10 of the Billboard 200. The E.N.D. was the 7th best-selling album of 2009 in the U.S. It also debuted at number one in Australia, number two in New Zealand and three in the United Kingdom. Three additional singles, "Imma Be", "Alive", and "Meet Me Halfway", were released through the iTunes Store in the three weeks running up to the album's release.

In 2009, the group became one of only artists to have simultaneously held the No. 1 and No. 2 spots on the Billboard Hot 100, with their singles "Boom Boom Pow" and "I Gotta Feeling", with the next single "Meet Me Halfway" achieving similar success, from the album The E.N.D.. These three singles topped the chart for 30 consecutive weeks in 2009. The album later produced a third Hot 100 number-one placement with "Imma Be", making the group one of few to ever place three number one singles on the chart from the same album before being followed with "Rock That Body" which managed to peak in the Top 10 of Hot 100. "I Gotta Feeling" became the first single to sell more than 1 million downloads in the United Kingdom.

The Black Eyed Peas were ranked 12th on the Billboard's Decade-End Chart Artist of the Decade, and 7th in the Hot 100 Artists of the Decade. In November 2010, they released the album The Beginning. The first single of the album was "The Time (Dirty Bit)" and topped the charts in many countries. In February 2011, the group performed at the Super Bowl XLV halftime show. The album's second single was "Just Can't Get Enough" and was released in February 2011. The music video was filmed in Japan one week before the 2011 Tōhoku earthquake and tsunami. The third single "Don't Stop the Party" was released in May 2011. In July 2011 the group announced that they are taking a break and have denied breakup rumors.

=== 2011–2024: We Can Be Anything, solo ventures ===
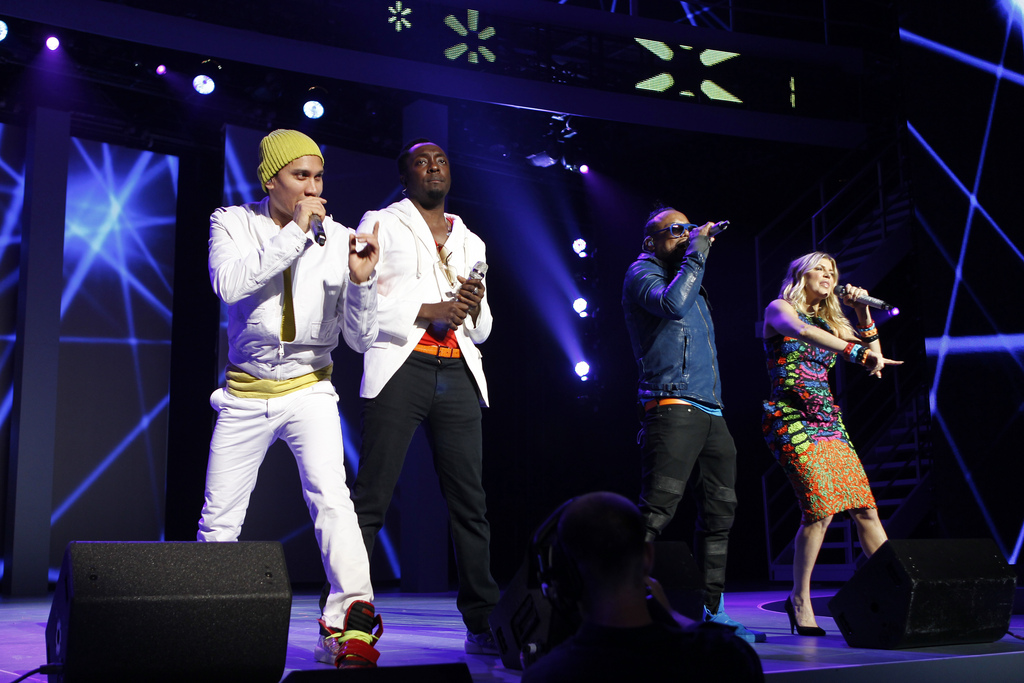
The Black Eyed Peas in 2011

On October 11, apl.de.ap launched his new advocacy campaign with a song called "We Can Be Anything" for education, encouraging children in the Philippines and around the world to stay in school. He also teamed up with the Ninoy and Cory Aquino Foundation (NCAF), 57-75 Movement, and the Department of Education. Apl.de.ap and NCAF plan to build 10,000 classrooms in two years or less through the advocacy. His bandmates helped set the campaign grand launch at the Black Eyed Peas concert on October 25 at the SM Mall of Asia concert grounds. On November 29, Apl.de.ap performed the campaign song with will.i.am at the Mnet Asian Music Awards held at the Singapore Indoor Stadium.

On October 13, he teamed up with Smart Communications to release a music video called "Jump In" featuring American Idol Season 11 runner-up Jessica Sanchez. In March 2013, apl.de.ap was confirmed to be one of the four coaches of the inaugural season of The Voice of the Philippines. On September 22, he premiered his new single "Balikbayan" on The Voice of the Philippines. He performed the song alongside the Top 8 contestants and Miss Universe 2010 fourth runner-up Venus Raj during the results night of the semi-finals. On September 27, he released the digital single, "Going Out". He also revealed that "Balikbayan" will be released on December. On January 31, 2015, apl.de.ap revealed his newest single and its accompanying music video, "Be", featuring Honey Cocaine and Jessica Reynoso.

He also appeared as a guest mentor for will.i.am on the third series of The Voice Australia. On June 12, 2014, he confirmed his return for the second season of The Voice of the Philippines.

apl.de.ap collaborated with Filipino composer Ryan Cayabyab for his performance in the opening ceremony of the 2019 Southeast Asian Games in the Philippines. He and the rest of the Black Eyed Peas also performed in the closing ceremony.

On April 26, 2025, apl.de.ap had just finished performing a solo concert at the Lapu Lapu Day festival in Vancouver when a perpetrator drove through the crowd, killing 11 attendees.

== Other ventures ==
=== Philanthropy ===
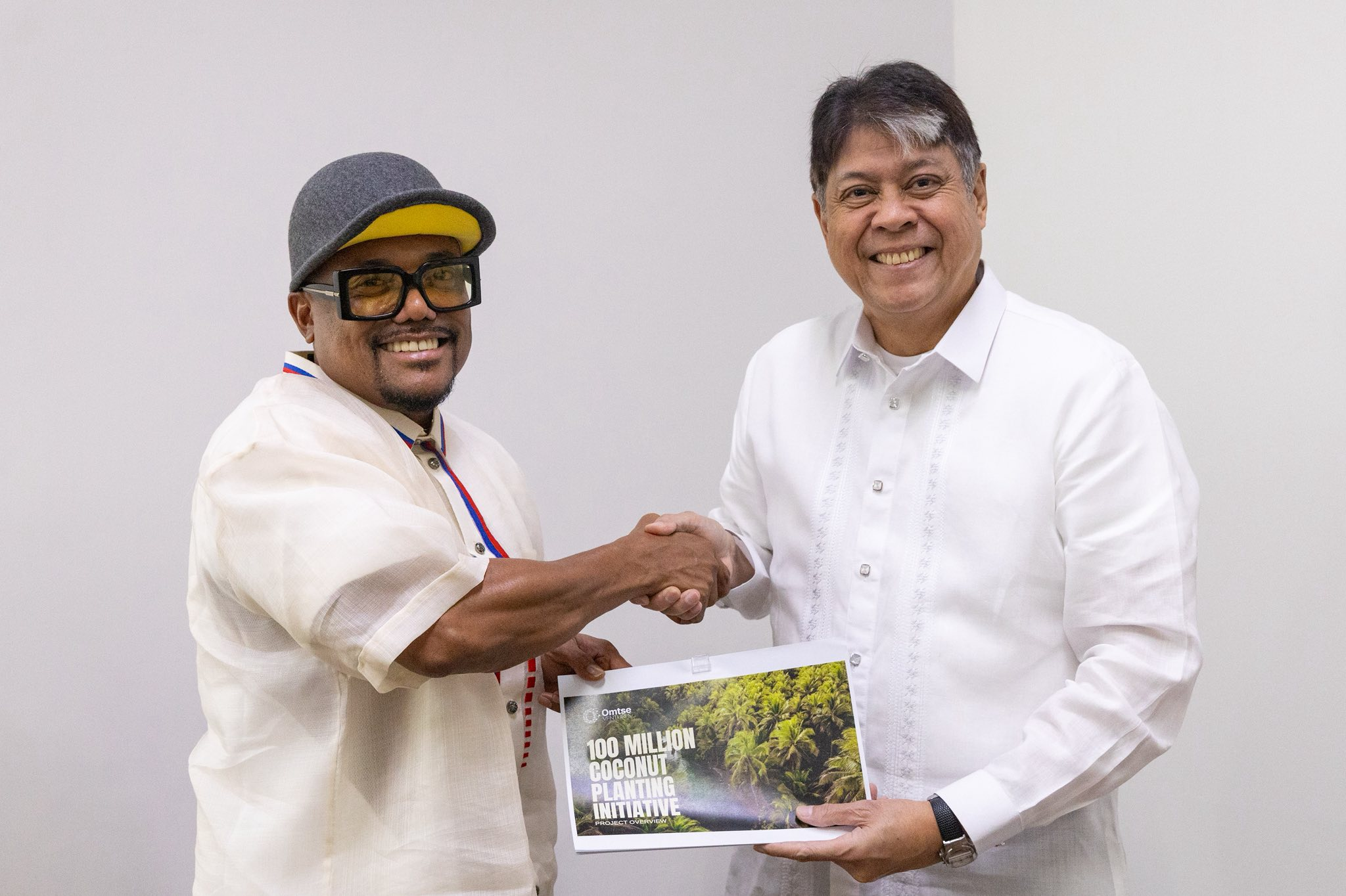
Apl.de.ap meets with Philippine senator Kiko Pangilinan in 2025

apl.de.ap was honored in the United States by the This Time Foundation for his charity works.

On November 18, 2008, he founded the Apl Foundation International (APLFI) to help various communities and children in the Philippines and throughout Asia. In 2011, after expressing his desire to help improve education in the Philippines, APLFI formed a partnership with the Ninoy and Cory Aquino Foundation (NCAF) to create the "We Can Be Anything" advocacy campaign, where apl.de.ap and NCAF plan to build 10,000 classrooms in two years or less through the advocacy.

=== The Voice of the Philippines ===
During an interview with The Huffington Post in 2012, he stated that he had plans to launch his own talent show in the Philippines. "I've been working myself up to do it because I'm not used to being on TV everyday... I've been offered a show for next year," he revealed. This eventually fueled rumors that he would join the panel of the show, after ABS-CBN acquired the rights to launch a local version of The Voice franchise later that year.

On March 1, 2013, ABS-CBN confirmed that they were in the final stages of negotiating with his management to become its fourth and last official coach of the show. On March 7, it was announced through ABS-CBN's entertainment website, Push, that apl would sit as the fourth coach. On March 20, the network's official website stated that he was scheduled to do the initial promotional plug with TFC London and was scheduled to arrive in Manila by April to meet and work with the three other coaches and the rest of the show's team. His promotional television plug was aired on March 27 right after TV Patrol. During his introduction as the fourth coach, he was dubbed as "The voice that ruled the worldwide music chart."

In an interview conducted by ABS-CBN News, apl admitted that it was will.i.am who encouraged him to accept the coaching stint in The Voice of the Philippines. will.i.am is also a coach on The Voice UK. apl also told the press that he would be truthful in coaching his artists, as well give them constructive criticisms. He also wants to share his life experiences, what he has been through the music industry, and how hard it is to fulfill and reach it.

apl was also a coach on the second season of The Voice Teens.

=== BMBX Entertainment ===
In 2014, apl opened his independent record label, BMBX Entertainment, whose name refers to 'boombox'. The label aims to sign South East Asian artists and give them a Western-style production by collaborating with musicians in Los Angeles. It sources its talent from the Philippines, Singapore and Malaysia. Its current roster includes Slapshock, Kevin Lester and The Voice Philippines season 1 semi-finalist Jessica Reynoso.

=== Omtse Ventures ===
In 2025, apl.de.ap co-founded Omtse Ventures to expand his partnership with the Philippine Coconut Authority (PCA), creating income opportunities for coconut farmers through a trading system that converts sustainable practices into carbon credits for exchange in carbon markets. The new venture and collaboration also builds on an earlier agreement with the Philippine Coffee Board to promote coconut-coffee intercropping for export, with the PCA providing infrastructure, Apl.de.Ap leading farmer training and communication, and the board handling research and product development. Under the deal, the Philippine Department of Agriculture's High Value Crops Development Program pledged agricultural inputs to support the initiative.

== Personal life ==
During a 2012 interview with ABC News, apl.de.ap said that he was born with a condition called nystagmus, which is characterized by an involuntary movement of the eyes that limits vision. The interview showed him undergoing an eye surgery by Beverly Hills eye surgeon Brian Boxer Wachler to implant artificial lenses into his eyes to correct his nearsightedness and nystagmus.

Aside from being fluent in English, Pineda is a native speaker of two Philippine languages: Tagalog and Kapampangan.

== Discography ==
=== As lead artist ===
Title	Year	Label
"We Can Be Anything"	2012	UMG Philippines
"Going Out" (featuring Damien Leroy)	2013	Interscope Records
"Legend" (with !llmind featuring Prince Ya & A.L.)	2024	Allan Pineda
"2 Proud" (with Sandara Park)	2024	Allan Pineda
"Ready" (with SB19)	2024	Allan Pineda

=== Collaborations ===
Title	Year	Label
"That's Right" (Brian Green featuring will.i.am & apl.de.ap)	1996	Yab Yum Records
"On the Dancefloor" (David Guetta featuring will.i.am & apl.de.ap)	2009	Warner Music Group
"Spaceship" (Benny Benassi featuring apl.de.ap, Kelis, & Jean Baptiste)	2010	Ultra Records
"Gettin' Dumb" (will.i.am featuring apl.de.ap & 2NE1)	2013	Interscope Records
"Crazy 'Bout U" (J. Rey Soul featuring apl.de.ap)	2015	BMBX Entertainment

== Awards ==
- 2008 – Special Citation – Myx Music Awards
- 2010 – Best Hip-Hop/Rap Performance: Take Me to the Philippines – Filipino-American Vocal Arts Society Online Music Awards
- 2012 GMMSF Box-Office Entertainment Awards - Global Achievement by a Filipino Artist
