= Dancing Astronaut =

American media platform covering electronic music

- Website type: Music, Media and Entertainment
- Available in: English
- Founded: July 29, 2009; 17 years ago
- Headquarters: New York City, New York, U.S.
- Founders: Senthil Chidambaram, Kevin Kaiser
- Editor: Andrew Spada
- Key people: Kevin Kaiser, Andrew Spada, Senthil Chidambaram (Board of Directors)
- Website: dancingastronaut.com

Dancing Astronaut is an American media platform founded in 2009 that primarily covers the electronic dance music industry. The website covers concerts and festivals, reports on entertainment news, reviews music, and publishes original content syndicated across on-demand audio platforms.

== History ==
Dancing Astronaut was started in 2009 by Kevin Kaiser and Senthil Chidambaram as a platform for the emerging electronic dance music culture. As electronic dance music grew in popularity in the United States, Dancing Astronaut became known as the source of information that provided the youth audience with detailed insights into the expanding community. The company was incorporated in 2012.

In 2012, Billboard Magazine referred to Dancing Astronaut as "The voice of the EDM generation". Profiling the notable companies in the rapidly expanding industry of electronic dance music, Billboard's article titled The Takeover of EDM also praised Dancing Astronaut for its "style that resonates with EDM's young fan base" and as a "content company with a strong, recognizable brand already in place." Billboard positioned Dancing Astronaut as a valuable asset if it were to be acquired by Robert Sillerman's SFX Entertainment.

In January 2014, Dancing Astronaut re-launched their website to "showcase interactive media in dynamic, innovative ways." Expanding beyond the original blogroll format, Dancing Astronaut introduced a new user experience to change the way its audience engaged with content, creating conversation around news and music. Later that year, Dancing Astronaut was named in the "Top 20 Most Influential Music Blogs" by Digital Music News.

In 2015 it had been rumored that Dancing Astronaut was to be acquired by a major event promoter. The New York Times reported that Dancing Astronaut was "in talks to be acquired by Insomniac, a dance promoter whose majority owner is Live Nation."

Dancing Astronaut has been nominated for Best Music Media Resource at the International Dance Music Awards each year since 2014.

In January 2026, Co-Editors-In-Chief Ross Goldenberg and Zachary Salafia departed Dancing Astronaut after nine and five years with the publication, respectively. The editors, who had been credited with the platform's recent expansion and revenue growth, cited a lack of operational alignment with ownership as the primary reasons for their involuntary departures.

== Radio ==
In January 2012, Dancing Astronaut launched their flagship podcast, Axis, hosting DJ mixes from guest artists on a weekly basis. Syndicated on iTunes and SoundCloud, each episode garners tens of thousands of listeners. Dancing Astronaut has produced over 180 episodes of Axis entering 2017, with guests including Martin Garrix, Afrojack, and others.

== Brand partnerships ==
Dancing Astronaut has been the official media partner various music festivals across the globe including New York City's Electric Zoo, TomorrowWorld, Mysteryland (US) and Ultra Europe. P Diddy's Revolt network partnered with Dancing Astronaut for their Summer Madness campaign in 2014 to further tap into the dance music audience.

In 2014, Dancing Astronaut was a launch partner of Beats Music, one of the initial brands to serve as guest programmers to the streaming service, alongside outlets such as Rolling Stone and Pitchfork. Following Apple's acquisition of Beats Music, Dancing Astronaut was again tapped as a featured curator of Apple Music upon its launch in 2015.

== In popular culture ==
=== will.i.am controversy ===
On April 16, 2013, Dancing Astronaut published a report accusing producer will.i.am of stealing from the production of "Rebound" by Arty and Mat Zo for his own single, "Let's Go" featuring Chris Brown. The article provoked instant responses from Chris Brown, who tweeted his defense of participation on the song. Dancing Astronaut's findings were picked up by major US news outlets and became the center of controversy that questioned will.i.am's ethics, ultimately leading to the producer's admission later that month.
