= Earin =

Swedish earbud company

- Type: Private
- Industry: Audio equipment
- Founded: 2014
- Founders: Kiril Trajkovski (CEO); Olle Lindén (CTO); Per Sennström (COO)
- Headquarters: Malmö, Sweden
- Area served: Worldwide
- Products: Earbuds
- Website: earin.com

Earin is a Swedish company that produces a line of small, wireless earbuds designed to connect to devices via Bluetooth. It released its first version (M-1) of the earpieces in 2015 with the next generation (M-2) entering the market in 2018. Earin was founded in 2014 and is based in Malmö, Sweden.

== History ==
Earin was founded in 2014 in Malmö, Sweden by Kiril Trajkovski, Olle Lindén, and Per Sennström. Trajkovski serves as the company's CEO, Lindén as its CTO, and Sennström as its COO. The company started a Kickstarter campaign in 2014, raising nearly $1 million to manufacture its wireless earbuds. Earin introduced the first iteration of its earbuds (known as the Earin M-1 model) to the market in the fall of 2015. At the end of the year, the company also received SEK 15 million in venture funding from the BlueWise Fund.

In January 2017, Earin announced the second generation (Earin M-2) of its earbuds at that year's Consumer Electronics Show (CES). Later that month, the company raised SEK 30 million from a group of equity investors including Midroc Invest, LMK, and Granitor Invest. In January 2018, it was announced at CES that recording artist will.i.am's consumer electronics company, i.am+, had purchased Earin. The deal, however, was never finalized, and it was announced in May 2019 that it had been called off entirely due to "unfulfilled obligations". Despite this, the Earin M-2 earbuds were released to the market in August 2018.

== Products ==
Earin produces a line of small, lightweight, and wireless earbuds that connect to smartphones via Bluetooth. As of 2020, the company has released two generations of its earbuds: the M-1 and the M-2. The newer M-2 version features functional upgrades including built-in microphones and touch features for answering calls, playing music, and accessing voice control for Siri or Google. The earbuds can be charged in a portable magnetic charging case, and when they are operational, both earpieces are connected to one another by near-field magnetic induction communication. Both earpieces are also designed to work in either the left or the right ear.
