= Let's Go (will.i.am song) =

Song by will.i.am featuring Chris Brown

from the album #willpower
- Released: April 16, 2013
- Recorded: 2012
- Genre: Dance-pop; hip house
- Length: 5:34
- Label: will.i.am Music Group; Interscope
- Songwriters: William Adams; Artem Stolyarov; Matan Zohar; Christopher Brown
- Producer: will.i.am

Audio
- "Let's Go" on YouTube

"Let's Go" is a song by will.i.am that features Chris Brown, which was part of the former's fourth studio album #willpower before being removed in November 2013. The reason for the song's removal was due to the unlicensed sampling of "Rebound" by Arty and Mat Zo. It was replaced with "Feelin' Myself" on the re-release.

== Charts ==
| Chart (2013) | Peak position |
|---|---|
| US Hot Dance/Electronic Songs (Billboard) | 38 |
