= Fall Down (will.i.am song) =

2013 single by will.i.am featuring Miley Cyrus

Single by will.i.am featuring Miley Cyrus

from the album #willpower
- Released: April 16, 2013
- Studio: Luke's in the Boo (Malibu, CA); Record Plant (Hollywood, CA)
- Genre: Electropop; hip hop
- Length: 5:07
- Label: Interscope
- Songwriters: William Adams; Lukasz Gottwald; Benjamin Levin; Henry Walter
- Producers: Dr. Luke; Benny Blanco; Cirkut

will.i.am singles chronology
"Bang Bang" (2013)	"Fall Down" (2013)	"Something Really Bad" (2013)

Miley Cyrus singles chronology
"Ashtrays and Heartbreaks" (2013)	"Fall Down" (2013)	"We Can't Stop" (2013)

Licensed audio
- "Fall Down" on YouTube

"Fall Down" is a song by American recording artist will.i.am featuring Miley Cyrus from his fourth studio album, #willpower (2013). It was released on April 16, 2013, by Interscope Records as the fifth single from the album. The song was written and produced by will.i.am, Dr. Luke, Benny Blanco, and Cirkut. "Fall Down" is an electropop and hip hop song; it strays from the electronic dance elements displayed in will.i.am's earlier singles "Scream & Shout" and "#thatPower", and instead leans towards an urban contemporary style.

"Fall Down" received generally negative reviews from music critics, who were disappointed with its overall production and drew comparisons to the work of American recording artist Kesha. It peaked at number 58 on the U.S. Billboard Hot 100, and charted in the lower ends of several record charts worldwide. However, the song reached numbers 14 and 15 on the Australian ARIA Charts and the Official New Zealand Music Chart, respectively, being certified gold in both countries. In the United States when it was planned to be a single, the track was promoted with live performances on Jimmy Kimmel Live! and Good Morning America, weeks later it was confirmed the single release was cancelled.

== Background and composition ==
"With Miley, it was a bit of a merger. I heard this wonderfulness bleeding through the doors and a friend of mine, Dr. Luke said to come and listen. And I was like, who is that? He just said, 'keep listening' and then he said, 'guess who it is?' I was like, Björk. Nope. Is it Portishead coming back?... It was Miley Cyrus. Then Miley walks in the room and I was like, this shit is fresh, we have to collaborate. Then she got on and added her vocals for 'Fall Down'."

— will.i.am describing his collaboration with Cyrus.

"Fall Down" marks the first of three collaborations between will.i.am and Cyrus in 2013. In October, he was credited as a songwriter and producer on the track "Do My Thang" from her fourth studio album Bangerz, while Cyrus was featured on his track "Feelin' Myself" from the reissue of his fourth studio album #willpower in November. will.i.am first became interested in collaborating with Cyrus after hearing an earlier version of her single "Wrecking Ball", and came in contact with her through producer Mike Will Made It.

"Fall Down" was first released on April 16, 2013, preceding the release of #willpower in the United States. It served as the follow-up to will.i.am's earlier singles "Scream & Shout" with Britney Spears and "#thatPower" with Justin Bieber, and served as a promotional single from the record. will.i.am and Cyrus promoted the song with live performances on Jimmy Kimmel Live! and Good Morning America in June. It was released to Australian radio stations in July 2013 as the third single from the record; an Italian release followed on September 6.

"Fall Down"
A 30-second sample of "Fall Down" by will.i.am featuring Miley Cyrus, where the chorus is heard.

In contrast from the electronic dance music elements presented in "Scream & Shout" and "#thatPower", "Fall Down" leans towards an urban contemporary musical style. The chorus incorporates electropop elements, while the verses tend towards a hip hop format, while the track itself culminates with an orchestral bridge. will.i.am mentioned the bridge as his favorite piece of #willpower, and described the overall song as sounding like "Quincy Jones just sneezed on it." Lyrically, the track describes the positive impact a couple has on each other, as seen in the lines "Girl, you're like an elevator cause you always pick me up / Girl, you're like a doctor when I'm sick you always stitch me up".

== Critical reception ==
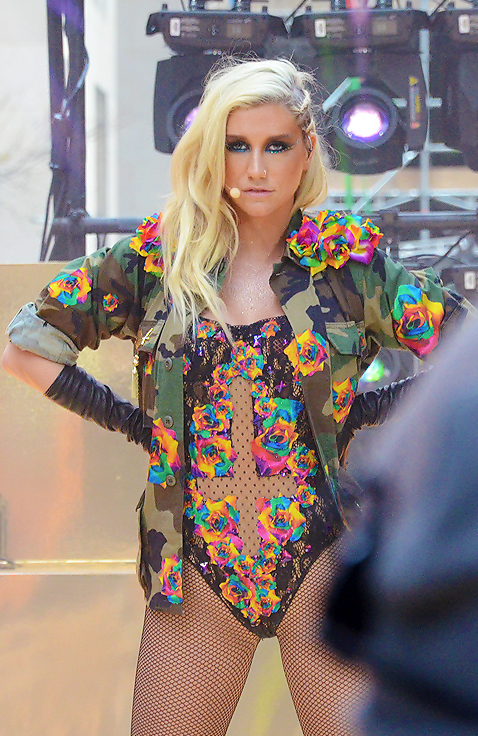
Critics compared "Fall Down" to Dr. Luke's collaborations with Kesha (pictured).

"Fall Down" received generally negative reviews from music critics, who were disappointed with its overall production. Writing for AllMusic, Fred Thomas was displeased that featuring "big gun" Cyrus still resulted in a "manufactured disposable pop moment", and further elaborated that the song felt like one of #willpower's "interminable 15 tracks [that] were written in the studio moments before they were recorded." Sam Lansky from Idolator shared a similar sentiment, opining that Cyrus felt "mostly phoned-in" by comparison with the "emotional punch" Cyrus delivered on her collaboration with American rapper Snoop Lion, "Ashtrays and Heartbreaks". Andy Peterson of Contactmusic.com criticized the production of the track, stating that listeners are "treated to the sort of identikit trance-plus-autotune sound that's been annexing American teen culture in the last couple of years".

Writing for entertainment.ie, Karen Lawler criticized lyrics like "you could be my Coca Cola, let me sip it up" for acting as a substitute for the "articulate rhymes on which [will.i.am] built his reputation", Brent Faulkner from PopMatters agreed that the lyrical content was sub-par, and called the song itself "utterly ridiculous". Mesfin Fekadu from The Huffington Post called Cyrus' contributions to the song "forgettable". Gregory Hicks of The Michigan Daily compared "Fall Down" to "Die Young" and "Crazy Kids" by American recording artist Kesha, all three of which were produced by Dr. Luke, which Hicks felt indicated that "Dr. Luke's production and writing continues to dwindle as he copy and pastes his work with Ke$ha onto this will.i.am track."

== Commercial performance ==
In the United States, "Fall Down" peaked at number 58 on the Billboard Hot 100. It also charted at number four on the Dance/Electronic Songs component chart. The track reached number 15 on the Canadian Hot 100, which is also organized by Billboard. In Europe, the track experienced varying commercial success. "Fall Down" peaked at number 17 on the Irish Singles Chart, and charted at number 37 on the Swedish Sverigetopplistan. It reached number 45 on the Ö3 Austria Top 40 and number 43 on the French SNEP. The track respectively peaked at numbers 50 and 52 on the Wallonia Ultratop and the Flanders Ultratip in Belgian, and respectively reached numbers five and 30 on the Dance charts in each region. It also charted at number 59 on the Swiss Hitparade. In Oceania, "Fall Down" respectively peaked at numbers 14 and 15 on the Australian ARIA Charts and the Official New Zealand Music Chart; it was certified platinum in Australia, and gold in New Zealand.

== Credits and personnel ==
Credits adapted from the liner notes of #willpower.

- Produced by Dr. Luke, Benny Blanco and Cirkut
- Written by William Adams, Lukasz Gottwald, Benjamin Levin, Henry Walter
- Orchestral and string arrangement by Onree Gill and will.i.am
- Orchestral portions by Czech Symphony Orchestra
- Mixed by Serban Ghenea
- Additional mixing by Dylan "3-d" Dresdow
- Recorded and engineered by Clint Gibbs at Luke's In The Boo in Malibu, Ca & will.i.am and Padraic "Padlock" Kerin at Record Plant in Hollywood, Ca
- Engineering assisted by Rachel Findlen
- Czech Symphony Orchestra recorded and engineered by Michal Pekárek at Ve Smečkách in Prague, Czech Republic

== Charts ==
=== Weekly charts ===
Chart (2013)	Peak position
Australia (ARIA)	14
Austria (Ö3 Austria Top 40)	45
Belgium (Ultratip Bubbling Under Flanders)	52
Belgium (Ultratop Flanders Dance)	30
Belgium (Ultratop 50 Wallonia)	50
Belgium (Ultratop Wallonia Dance)	5
Canada Hot 100 (Billboard)	15
France (SNEP)	43
Ireland (IRMA)	17
New Zealand (Recorded Music NZ)	15
Poland (Polish Airplay New)	1
Sweden (Sverigetopplistan)	37
Switzerland (Schweizer Hitparade)	59
UK Singles (Official Charts)	34
UK Hip Hop/R&B (Official Charts)	7
US Billboard Hot 100	58
US Hot Dance/Electronic Songs (Billboard)	4

=== Year-end charts ===
Chart (2013)	Position
Australia (ARIA)	96
France (SNEP)	180
US Hot Dance/Electronic Songs (Billboard)	45

== Certifications ==
Region	Certification	Certified units/sales
Australia (ARIA)	Platinum	70,000^{^}
New Zealand (RMNZ)	Platinum	15,000^{*}
Sweden (GLF)	Gold	20,000^{‡}
^{*} Sales figures based on certification alone.^{^} Shipments figures based on certification alone.^{‡} Sales+streaming figures based on certification alone.

== Release history ==
Region	Date	Format	Label	Ref.
United Kingdom	April 16, 2013	Digital download	Polydor	
United States	April 16, 2013	Digital download	Interscope	
Australia	July 2013	Contemporary hit radio	Universal Music	
Italy	September 6, 2013	Contemporary hit radio	Universal Music	
