= Bang Bang (will.i.am song) =

Single by will.i.am

from the album #willpower and The Great Gatsby: Music from Baz Luhrmann's Film
- Released: May 20, 2013
- Recorded: 2012
- Genre: Electro swing
- Length: 4:38
- Label: Interscope
- Songwriters: William Adams; James P. Johnson; Cecil Mack; Sonny Bono
- Producers: Sandro Silva; Quintino; Maarten Vorwerk; will.i.am

Will.i.am singles chronology
| "Crazy Kids" (2013) | "Bang Bang" (2013) | "Fall Down" (2013) |

Music video
- "Bang Bang" on YouTube

"Bang Bang" is a song recorded by American rapper and producer will.i.am featuring the vocals of Shelby Spalione. The single features as the third track on the soundtrack album of the 2013 Baz Luhrmann film The Great Gatsby. "Bang Bang" is also featured on the deluxe edition of will.i.am's fourth studio album #willpower. "Bang Bang" peaked within the top 10 of the charts in Belgium (Wallonia) and the United Kingdom.

== Composition ==
"Bang-Bang" is an up-tempo fusion of 1920s jazz instrumentals along with synth-pop elements. The track features partially Louis Armstrong-inspired lead vocals by will.i.am and additional sing-along by guest vocalist "Shelby Spalione". It incorporates elements of the 1923 Cecil Mack–James P. Johnson composition "Charleston". Lyrics include the line "My baby shot me down" from the 1966 song "Bang Bang (My Baby Shot Me Down)" by American recording artist Cher, written by Sonny Bono.

== Live performances ==
will.i.am performed "Bang Bang" live on May 2, 2013, during season 12 of American Idol. He also performed the song in the United Kingdom with Leah McFall during the final of the second season of The Voice UK (will.i.am is a coach on the show). The original version of "Bang Bang" rose to a peak of number three on the UK Singles Chart following the performance. will.i.am later hinted that a duet version of the song with McFall would be officially released.

== Controversy ==
In April 2013, controversy arose over allegations that two songs from #willpower – "Bang Bang" and "Let's Go" – may have used unauthorized samples from the EDM instrumentals "Epic" by Sandro Silva and Quintino and "Rebound" by Arty and Mat Zo. "Bang Bang", in particular, was alleged to have copied the chord progression of the drop from "Epic".

== Music video ==
A music video to accompany the release of "Bang Bang" was first released onto YouTube on May 20, 2013, at a total length of two minutes and fifty-seven seconds. The video features a 1920s-themed speakeasy stage show by will.i.am and a band playing various brass instruments. He is later accompanied by Spalione in Charleston flappers-style; will.i.am and his band then perform highly choreographed routines. The video also features a tap dance solo by will.i.am.

== Charts and certifications ==
=== Weekly charts ===
| Chart (2013) | Peak position |
|---|---|
| Belgium (Ultratip Bubbling Under Flanders) | 12 |
| Belgium (Ultratop Dance Bubbling Under) | 9 |
| Belgium (Ultratip Bubbling Under Wallonia) | 9 |
| Czech Republic Airplay (ČNS IFPI) | 83 |
| Euro Digital Song Sales (Billboard) | 5 |
| France (SNEP) | 53 |
| Ireland (IRMA) | 14 |
| Scottish Singles Sales (Official Charts) | 4 |
| UK Singles (Official Charts) | 3 |
| UK Hip Hop/R&B (Official Charts) | 1 |
| US Hot Dance/Electronic Songs (Billboard) | 21 |

=== Year-end charts ===
| Chart (2013) | Position |
|---|---|
| UK Singles (Official Charts Company) | 33 |
| US Hot Dance/Electronic Songs (Billboard) | 73 |

=== Certifications ===
| Region | Certification | Certified units/sales |
|---|---|---|
| United Kingdom (BPI) | Platinum | 600,000^{‡} |
^{‡} Sales+streaming figures based on certification alone.

== Release history ==
| Region | Date | Format | Label |
|---|---|---|---|
| United Kingdom | June 26, 2013 | Contemporary hit radio | Interscope |
| Australia | September 26, 2013 | Contemporary hit radio | Interscope |
