= Reaching for the Stars =

Reaching for the Stars may refer to:

- Reaching for the Stars (film), a 1955 West German drama film
- "Reaching For The Stars" (song), a 2012 song by Will.i.am
- Reaching for the Stars (TV series), a 2005 Taiwanese drama
  - Reaching for the Stars (soundtrack)
