= Great Times (song) =

Single by will.i.am

from the album #willpower
- Released: November 29, 2011
- Genre: Electro house; dance
- Length: 4:51 (single version); 4:36 (album version)
- Label: Interscope
- Songwriters: William Adams; Damien Leroy
- Producers: will.i.am; Freshman III; Damien Leroy

Will.i.am singles chronology
"T.H.E. (The Hardest Ever)" (2011)	"Great Times" (2011)	"This Is Love" (2012)

"Great Times" is a song by American recording artist will.i.am. Produced by will.i.am in collaboration with Freshman III and Damien Leroy, it was released as a single on November 29, 2011, in support of his fourth studio album #willpower (2013). The song, written by will.i.am about his experiences in Brazil, appears on #willpower in remixed form under the new title "Great Times Are Coming".

== Background ==
will.i.am wrote "Great Times" as a dedication to the country of Brazil. The song contains samples of Brazilian musician Jorge Ben Jor's "Taj Mahal". Explaining the inspiration behind "Great Times", will.i.am stated:

I know a country where its people know how to celebrate. Even without a specific reason. And its inhabitants see themselves as the country's future, without even knowing that the future is so close. They live with hope without knowing that fate is inevitable. It must be nice being in a place where the whole world wants to be. Where the future is not only bright, but fun. My soul sings a song for this place.

== Release ==
An unfinished version of the song initially leaked to the Internet in September 2011, at which will.i.am expressed his dissatisfaction. In a post to the social networking site Twitter, he wrote: "I never wanted that version released. Now I am very angry. Who leaked it? That's not how things should be. Not cool!" "Great Times" served as the first single from #willpower in Brazil, and was released as a digital single in the country on November 29, 2011. To promote the single's release, will.i.am partnered with Anheuser-Busch InBev, who pressed magazine advertisements containing a playable vinyl flexidisc single featuring "Great Times". "Great Times" was later released to Brazilian radio, peaking at number 59 on Billboard Brasil Hot 100 Airplay chart.

== Music video ==
The music video for "Great Times" was shot in the Brazilian cities of Rio de Janeiro and São Paulo. It was released on February 13, 2012, through will.i.am's VEVO channel. The video depicts will.i.am partying and travelling around Brazil. Reviewing the video, a critic for the website Idolator quipped that will.i.am "suggests that we all arrange our bags and we travel to Brazil."

== Charts ==
Chart (2011–2012)	Peak position
Brasil Hot 100 Airplay (Billboard)	59
South Korea International Singles (Gaon)	12

== Certifications and sales ==
Certifications and sales for "Great Times"
Region	Certification	Certified units/sales
Brazil (Pro-Música Brasil)	Gold	30,000^{‡}
South Korea	—	151,323
^{‡} Sales+streaming figures based on certification alone.

== Release history ==
Region	Date	Format	Label
Brazil	November 29, 2011	Digital download	Interscope Records
Brazil	May 2012	Vinyl flexidisc	Interscope Records
