= Willpower (will.i.am album) =

2013 studio album by will.i.am

#willpower

Studio album by will.i.am
- Released: April 16, 2013
- Studios: Ve Smečkách (Prague); Record Plant (Los Angeles); Afrojack (Spijkenisse, The Netherlands); The Blue Room (Hoogstraten, Belgium); Ethernet (Los Feliz); Metropolis (London); Luke's In The Boo (Malibu)
- Genres: Avant-garde; pop; electropop
- Length: 64:35
- Labels: will.i.am; Interscope
- Producers: will.i.am; Afrojack; Maejor; Steve Angello; Audiobot; Benny Blanco; Cirkut; DJ Mustard; Free School; Dr. Luke; FRESHM3N III; Hit-Boy; Mike Free; Sebastian Ingrosso; Lazy Jay; Zach "GFG" Jones; Damien "DJ Ammo" Leroy; Verrigni; Poet

Will.i.am chronology
Songs About Girls (2007)	#willpower (2013)

Singles from #willpower
- 1. "Great Times" Released: November 29, 2011; 2. "This Is Love" Released: May 14, 2012; 3. "Scream & Shout" Released: November 19, 2012; 4. "#thatPower" Released: March 15, 2013; 5. "Fall Down" Released: April 16, 2013; 6. "Bang Bang" Released: May 20, 2013

#willpower is the fourth studio album by American musician will.i.am, released on April 16, 2013. The album was originally titled Black Einstein and scheduled for release at the end of 2011. It was then renamed #willpower and delayed several more times. The album's first single "This Is Love" features Eva Simons, the second single "Scream & Shout" features Britney Spears, and Justin Bieber is featured on the third single "#thatPower". There is a remix of "Scream & Shout" that features Lil Wayne, Hit-Boy, Diddy and Waka Flocka Flame. Other guest appearances on the album include Afrojack, Juicy J, Chris Brown, Miley Cyrus, Skylar Grey, Nicole Scherzinger, Korean pop group 2NE1 and will.i.am's Black Eyed Peas bandmate apl.de.ap.

The album received mixed-to-negative reviews from music critics. It was re-released on November 26, 2013; the re-release includes the brand new single "Feelin' Myself" featuring Miley Cyrus, French Montana, Wiz Khalifa, and DJ Mustard, to replace "Let's Go" featuring Chris Brown.

== Background and production ==
During the recording of Black Eyed Peas' sixth studio album, The Beginning, band member Fergie revealed in an interview that will.i.am was in the process of recording a new solo album, tentatively entitled Black Einstein. Just days later, will.i.am confirmed the news, and announced that the album would be released in the fourth quarter of 2011. It was announced by will.i.am in November 2011 that he had changed the title of the album from Black Einstein to #willpower. will.i.am confirmed that he collaborated with Britney Spears, Demi Lovato, Jennifer Lopez, Cheryl Cole, Nicole Scherzinger, David Guetta, Kesha, Alicia Keys, Swedish House Mafia, Rihanna, Shakira, LMFAO, Eva Simons, Chris Brown, Mick Jagger, Busta Rhymes, Swizz Beatz, Miley Cyrus, Justin Bieber, Avril Lavigne and Ne-Yo – but not all the artists collaborated on the released version.

== Promotion ==
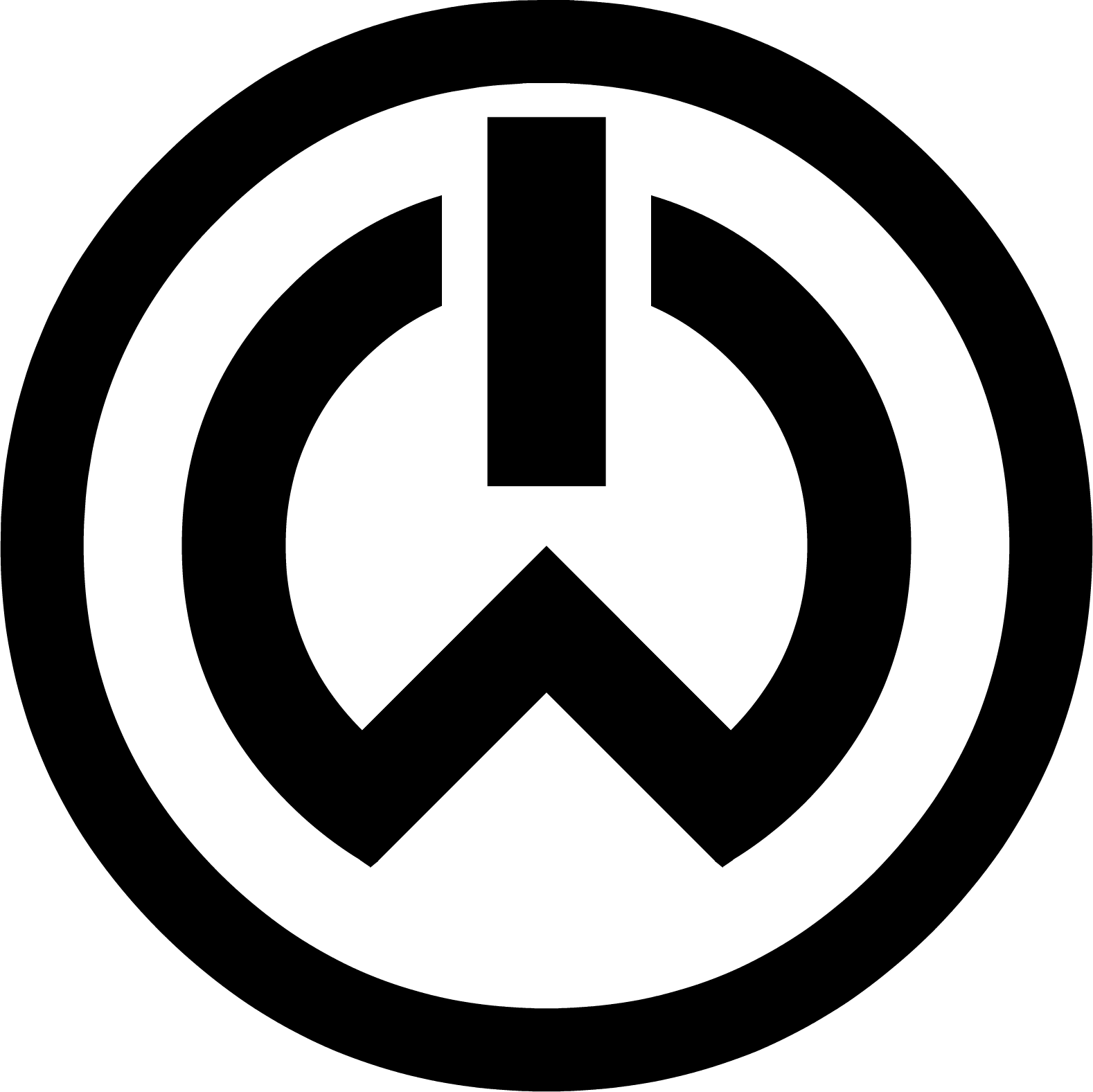
The #willpower insignia was a major promotional tool throughout the album's development, being featured in the artwork of all of the album's singles and the album itself. It also replaces will.i.am's head on the front cover of the deluxe edition of the album.

In April 2012, Italian car manufacturer Lancia commissioned two commercials, both featuring a track from #willpower, to promote their new line of Lancia Delta cars. The song, "Mona Lisa Smile", features Nicole Scherzinger, and was lent by will.i.am himself. However, the final version on the album is called "Smile Mona Lisa", and does not credit Scherzinger, though a different song called "Far Away from Home" does instead.

On August 13, 2012, will.i.am held a "wrap party" in celebration of cease production of #willpower. A flyer, which unveiled a silhouetted variant of the album artwork, invited fans for an open event, which would feature performances from artists who have worked on the new album and others. The party also included a private listening party of #willpower attended by invited guests, and asked listeners to pick the next single, which would succeed as the third American single from the album. There was a rumor that the next single chosen would be "Scream and Shout" featuring Britney Spears, which she later confirmed on Twitter. The party featured a red carpet event, which featured the new album artwork on wallpapers surrounding the event. It features the back of Adams' head imposed on a white background, imprinted with the words "#WILLPOWER" across. The party also featured experimental light and pyrotechnics which will be used on Adams' upcoming tour to support willpower. The event was attended by Lindsay Lohan, Meagan Good, Nicole Scherzinger, Steve Aoki, Wilmer Valderrama, Corey Feldman, David Faustino and many others. The party itself was held at the Avalon Hollywood, where will.i.am, Steve Aoki and DJ Poet played sets of music which included music from their respective albums and new renditions of popular charting songs. Also at the party, will.i.am performed "Fresh Shit" (later mixed as "Freshy" on the final version of #willpower) and "Dirty Beat" (scrapped from the album) for the very first time, along with many other samples from #willpower. This included a brand new mix for "Great Times" (scrapped from the album in favour of another mix of the song), which was previously released as a single in November 2011. Along with a medley of #willpower songs and "This Is Love", he also performed notable remixes of Gotye's 2011 hit single, "Somebody That I Used to Know", and Kanye West's "Mercy".

In the lead-up to the album's release in Australia, Perth-based online newspaper Perth Now ran a competition to win CD copies of #willpower before its release on April 19.

== Singles ==
"Great Times", which would later be remixed as "Great Times Are Coming" on the final version of #willpower, was released as the lead single from the album only in Brazil on November 29, 2011. The song was chosen to thank the support of the Brazilian fans. The single peaked at #2 on the Brazilian Airplay charts, and was also successful in South Korea, where it peaked at #12 on the Singles Chart.

"This Is Love" was released as the official lead single worldwide on June 1, 2012. The track features vocals from Eva Simons. The song premiered on Capital FM and BBC Radio 1 on May 14, 2012. It was later confirmed that the single would be released in the United Kingdom first on June 24. The music video for the song, part of which was shot on London's South Bank, with Tower Bridge in the background, premiered on May 25, 2012. The track itself was produced by Steve Angello of Swedish House Mafia. The track peaked at number one in the United Kingdom, his first solo number-one single in Britain. The track was released in the United States on June 19, 2012, officially impacting Top 40 Mainstream radio, and being promoted with a performance on America's Got Talent.

"Scream & Shout" became the second single from #willpower on November 20, 2012. The song features vocals from American singer Britney Spears. Both Spears and will.i.am confirmed the filming of a music video for the single's release via their Twitter accounts. The single was released in the United States prior to its release in the United Kingdom. The track first leaked online on November 17, 2012. It features Spears chanting in a British home counties accent, and a sample of the famous 'Britney, bitch' hook from her single "Gimme More". The accompanying video was filmed on the weekend of October 13 and 14, 2012 at Delfino Studios in Hollywood, California. The song received its worldwide radio debut on November 19, 2012. The music video premiered on November 28, 2012, during The X Factor. The track also officially impacted Top 40, Mainstream and Rhythmic radio on November 27, 2012. At the end of January 2013, a hip-hop remix of the song featuring Lil Wayne, Waka Flocka Flame, Hit-Boy and Diddy in addition to Spears was released. A new accompanying music video was released on February 14, 2013.

"#thatPower" featuring Justin Bieber was announced as the third single from #willpower on March 15, 2013, via will.i.am's official Twitter account. Premiering on Capital FM that day, the single was released on March 18, 2013, coinciding with the news that #willpower would finally be released on April 23, 2013.

"Bang Bang" was released as an official single in the UK. It officially impacted UK radios on June 26, 2013. The song was included in the official soundtrack of The Great Gatsby movie. The song was promoted on The Voice UK by will.i.am and his finalist Leah and with a live performance on American Idol. The song reached number 3 on the UK singles chart.

"Fall Down" featuring Miley Cyrus was released as a radio-only single in Australia and Italy. It was sent to Australian radio stations in July 2013 and to Italian radio stations in September 2013.

"Feelin' Myself" featuring Miley Cyrus, French Montana, DJ Mustard and Wiz Khalifa was released on November 26, 2013, as the lead single for the re-release of #willpower.

=== Promotional singles ===
"Reach for the Stars (Mars Edition)" was released as first promotional single on August 28, 2012. "Reach for the Stars (Mars Edition)" became the first song in history to be broadcast from another planet, completing a journey of more than 300 million miles between Mars and Earth. On April 16, 2013, "Fall Down" featuring Miley Cyrus was released as second promotional single from the album. Later, the song became an official single.

=== Other songs ===
"T.H.E. (The Hardest Ever)" was originally released as the lead single from the album, released on November 20, 2011. The track features vocals from both Jennifer Lopez and Mick Jagger. The single was released on the said date in the United States, and three months later on February 5, 2012, in the United Kingdom. The song peaked at #36 on the Billboard Hot 100 and at #3 on the UK Singles Chart respectively. After lower performance, the song wasn't set to be included in the album and it was replaced by "This Is Love" as lead single. The music video for "Mona Lisa Smile", a remix of the album's track "Smile Mona Lisa", was released on April 14, 2016. It features Nicole Scherzinger, who was not credited on the original version of the song that appears on the album. Despite this, the song wasn't released as a single or promotional single.

== Release and commercial reception ==
#willpower was first released on April 16, 2013, free to stream on YouTube, following the album's leak earlier that day. With a confirmed release date of April 22 in the United Kingdom and April 23 in the United States, the album was released on CD as early as April 19, 2013 in Australia and Germany. "Fall Down", featuring vocals from Miley Cyrus, was released as a promotional single on April 16, 2013, as part of iTunes Countdown to Willpower. The album debuted at number 9 on the Billboard 200 chart, with first-week sales of 29,000 copies in the United States. In its second week the album sold 9,300 more copies. As of June 12, 2013, the album has sold 58,000 copies in the United States. The album debuted at number 3 with first week sales of 20,464 sales in the UK. As of 2014 the album has sold 489.000 copies worldwide.

== Critical reception ==
Professional ratings
Aggregate scores
Source	Rating
Metacritic	49/100
Review scores
Source	Rating
AllMusic	2/5 stars
Daily Express	3/5 stars
The Guardian	2/5 stars
The Independent	3/5 stars
Knoxville News Sentinel	3/5 stars
The Observer	2/5 stars
PopMatters	4/10
Rolling Stone	3/5 stars
Slant Magazine	1.5/5 stars
USA Today	2/4 stars

#willpower received mixed reviews from music critics. On Metacritic, which assigns a weighted average score out of 100 to reviews and ratings from mainstream critics, the album received a metascore of 49, based on 13 reviews, a score which signifies "mixed or average reviews". Andy Gill from The Independent gave the album 3 out of 5 stars writing the album is "stuffed with sounds that, while in no sense as cutting-edge as he likes to make out, crest the wave of the popular" and compared it to the work of other artists such as David Guetta and Swedish House Mafia. Stephen Unwin from the Daily Express also gave the album 3 out of 5 stars writing that will.i.am "alongside enjoying a play on words, gets kicks out of collaborations." Jon Dolan from the Rolling Stone gave the album 3 out of 5 stars writing "Will.i.am's fourth solo album is exactly the Death Star-size Jägerbomb you'd expect."

On a more negative note, Kevin Liedel of Slant Magazine called the album "a slog of pop clichés and self-absorbed preening", criticizing how "every track can be boiled down to a handful of catchphrases, a fuzzed-up club beat, and some sort of glitchy, mid-song breakdown". Additionally, Brian Mansfield of USA Today noted that the album, at times, "veers often into high-def electro-pop silliness", although he positively noted the collaborative effort with "big-name stars".

== Sampling controversy ==
Controversy arose due to identical segments present in the song "Let's Go" and the track "Rebound" by Arty and Mat Zo. Arty claimed on Twitter that Interscope Records failed to ask permission from Anjunabeats before sampling "Rebound". Anjunabeats later released a statement that although Arty was credited in the sleeve notes, this is not a valid form of obtaining permission to use the sample. This statement was made in regard to will.i.am's comments made to the Associated Press in which he stated, "You can't steal if you credited somebody." In a later interview will.i.am admitted that the sample had not been properly cleared. Explaining the situation, Will said: "I wrote this song to Rebound this last year. I got in touch with Arty and showed it to him, did a different version to it 'cause I asked him [to] make it newer 'cause I don't just wanna take your song and rap over it. But we did that, we collaborated. But in a year's time, time's gone by [and] we preferred writing over and using the [original] rebound. Something happened and the clearance... hopefully we resolved the issue." The song was taken out of the re-release, and replaced by the single "Feelin' Myself".

== Track listing ==
#willpower – standard edition
No.	Title	Writer(s)	Producer(s)	Length
1.	"Good Morning"	William Adams; Jack Milas; Oli Chang	will.i.am	1:44
2.	"Hello" (featuring Afrojack)	Adams; Nick van de Wall; Jean Baptiste; Ryan Buendia; Padraic Kerin; Michael McHenry	Afrojack; will.i.am; Free School	4:45
3.	"This Is Love" (featuring Eva Simons)	Adams; Steve Angello; Sebastian Ingrosso; Max Martin; Verrigni; Eva Maria Simons; Mike Hamilton	will.i.am; Angello; Ingrosso	4:39
4.	"Scream & Shout" (with Britney Spears)	Adams; Tulisa Contostavlos; Jef Martens; Baptiste	Lazy Jay; will.i.am^{[a]}	4:42
5.	"Let's Go" (featuring Chris Brown)	Adams; Artem Stolyarov; Christopher Brown	will.i.am	5:34
6.	"Gettin' Dumb" (featuring apl.de.ap and 2NE1)	Adams; Allan Pineda; Baptiste; McHenry; Darrell Eversley; Howard Eversley; Shaun Spearman; Verrigni; Alain Whyte	will.i.am; Free School; FRESHM3N III	5:13
7.	"Geekin'"	Adams; Lukasz Gottwald; Henry Walter	will.i.am	3:34
8.	"Freshy" (featuring Juicy J)	Adams; Jordan Houston; D. Eversley; H. Eversley; Spearman; Jaime L. Munson	FRESHM3N III; will.i.am; Poet	4:06
9.	"#thatPower" (featuring Justin Bieber)	Adams; Damien Leroy; Justin Bieber	Leroy; Verrigni; will.i.am	4:39
10.	"Great Times Are Coming"	Adams; Leroy	will.i.am; FRESHM3N III; Leroy	4:36
11.	"The World Is Crazy" (featuring Dante Santiago)	Adams; George Pajon, Jr.; Caleb Speir	will.i.am	3:59
12.	"Fall Down" (featuring Miley Cyrus)	Adams; Gottwald; Benjamin Levin; Walter	Dr. Luke; Benny Blanco; Cirkut	5:07
13.	"Love Bullets" (featuring Skylar Grey)	Adams; Holly Hafermann; Keith Harris; Zachary Jones	will.i.am; Zach "GFG" Jones^{[a]}	4:11
14.	"Far Away from Home" (featuring Nicole Scherzinger)	Adams; Gottwald; Walter	will.i.am	3:54
15.	"Ghetto Ghetto" (featuring Baby Kaely)	Adams; Calvin Johnson; Brandon Green	Maejor Ali	3:52
Total length:				64:41

Deluxe edition bonus tracks
No.	Title	Writer(s)	Producer(s)	Length
16.	"Reach for the Stars"	Adams; Kenny "Audiobot" Oliver; Onree Gill	will.i.am; Verrigni; Audiobot^{[a]}	4:21
17.	"Smile Mona Lisa"	Adams; Pajon, Jr.; Antonio Maria; Luis Bonfa	will.i.am	3:36
18.	"Bang Bang"	Adams; James P. Johnson; Cecil Mack; Sonny Bono	will.i.am	4:38
Total length:				76:37

Japanese deluxe edition (Disc 2)
No.	Title	Writer(s)	Producer(s)	Length
1.	"Reach for the Stars"	Adams; Oliver; Gill	Lazy Jay; will.i.am^{[a]}; Hit-Boy^{[c]}	4:21
2.	"Smile Mona Lisa"	Adams; Pajon, Jr.; Maria; Bonfa	will.i.am	3:36
3.	"Bang Bang"	Adams; Johnson; Mack; Bono	will.i.am	4:41
4.	"Great Times" (Damien Leroy Version)	Adams; D. Eversley; H. Eversley; Spearman; Leroy	will.i.am; FRESHM3N III; Leroy	3:12
5.	"Scream & Shout" (Hit-Boy Remix) (featuring Britney Spears, Hit-Boy, Waka Flocka Flame, Lil Wayne and Diddy))	Adams; Dwayne Carter; Sean Combs; Chauncey Hollis; Juaquin Malphurs; Baptiste; John Wesley	will.i.am; Hit-boy	5:55
Total length:				21:47

Digital re-release
No.	Title	Writer(s)	Producer(s)	Length
5.	"Feelin' Myself" (featuring Miley Cyrus, French Montana, DJ Mustard and Wiz Khalifa)	Adams	DJ Mustard^{[a]}; Mike Free^{[a]}	4:13

Notes

- ^{^[a]} signifies an additional producer
- ^{^[b]} signifies a co-producer
- ^{^[c]} signifies a remixer
- "Let's Go" was replaced by "Feelin' Myself" on the re-release.

Sample credits

- "Good Morning" contains an interpolation of "Flowers Bloom", written by Jack Milas and Oli Chang, as performed by High Highs.
- "Smile Mona Lisa" contains elements of "Manhã de Carnaval", written by Luiz Bonfá, Antônio Maria, Les Nouvelles Editions Méridian (Sacem)
- "Let's Go" samples elements of the song "Rebound" by Arty and Mat Zo.
- "Bang Bang" contains elements of "Charleston" as written by James P. Johnson and Cecil Mack.

== Personnel ==
- Executive producers: will.i.am, Dante Santiago
- Tracking engineers: Afrojack, Chris "Tek" O'Ryan, Daniel Zaidenstadt, David Levy, John Hanes, Josh Gudwin, Padriac Kerin, Poet, will.i.am
- Mix engineers: Dylan Dresdow, Serban Ghenea, Steve Duda
- Mastering engineers: Brian "Big Bass" Gardner

== Charts ==
=== Weekly charts ===
Weekly chart performance for Willpower
Chart (2013)	Peak position
Australian Albums (ARIA)	9
Austrian Albums (Ö3 Austria)	15
Belgian Albums (Ultratop Flanders)	10
Belgian Albums (Ultratop Wallonia)	15
Canadian Albums (Billboard)	5
Dutch Albums (Album Top 100)	25
French Albums (SNEP)	5
German Albums (Offizielle Top 100)	11
Irish Albums (IRMA)	5
Italian Albums (FIMI)	15
Japanese Albums (Oricon)	11
New Zealand Albums (RMNZ)	5
Polish Albums (ZPAV)	36
Spanish Albums (Promusicae)	25
Swedish Albums (Sverigetopplistan)	58
Swiss Albums (Schweizer Hitparade)	10
UK Albums (Official Charts)	3
US Billboard 200	9
US Top Dance Albums (Billboard)	1

=== Year-end charts ===
Year-end chart performance for Willpower
Chart (2013)	Position
Australian Urban Albums (ARIA)	27
Belgian Albums (Ultratop Flanders)	104
French Albums (SNEP)	102
New Zealand Albums (RMNZ)	38
UK Albums (OCC)	101
US Top Dance/Electronic Albums (Billboard)	13

== Certifications ==
Certifications for Willpower
Region	Certification	Certified units/sales
Austria (IFPI Austria)	Gold	7,500^{*}
Brazil (Pro-Música Brasil) Deluxe	Gold	20,000^{‡}
Colombia	Gold	
France (SNEP)	Gold	50,000^{*}
Italy (FIMI)	Gold	25,000^{‡}
Mexico (AMPROFON)	Gold	30,000^{^}
New Zealand (RMNZ)	2× Platinum	30,000^{‡}
Sweden (GLF)	Gold	20,000^{‡}
United Kingdom (BPI)	Gold	100,000^{*}
^{*} Sales figures based on certification alone.^{^} Shipments figures based on certification alone.^{‡} Sales+streaming figures based on certification alone.

== Release history ==
Release history and formats for Willpower
Region	Date	Format	Edition	Label
Germany	April 19, 2013	Digital download, CD	Standard, deluxe	Universal Music
Australia	April 19, 2013	Digital download, CD	Standard, deluxe	Universal Music
United Kingdom	April 22, 2013	Digital download, CD	Standard, deluxe	Polydor
United States	April 23, 2013	Digital download, CD	Standard, deluxe	Interscope
France	April 23, 2013	Digital download, CD	Standard, deluxe	Interscope
Japan	April 24, 2013	Digital download, CD	Standard, deluxe	Universal Music Japan
United States	November 26, 2013	Digital download, CD	Re-release	Interscope/Universal
United Kingdom	January 26, 2014	Digital download, CD	Re-release	Polydor
