= T.H.E. (The Hardest Ever) =

2011 single by will.i.am

Single by will.i.am featuring Mick Jagger and Jennifer Lopez
- Released: November 20, 2011
- Recorded: 2011
- Studio: Record Plant (Los Angeles, CA)
- Genre: EDM
- Length: 4:47 (main version); 4:07 (radio edit)
- Label: Interscope
- Songwriters: William Adams; Kenneth Oliver; Dallas Austin; Tanya Lacey
- Producers: will.i.am; Audiobot; Austin; Jimmy Iovine (vocal)

will.i.am singles chronology
"Forever" (2011)	"T.H.E. (The Hardest Ever)" (2011)	"Great Times" (2011)

Mick Jagger singles chronology
"Old Habits Die Hard" (2004)	"T.H.E. (The Hardest Ever)" (2011)	"Black" (2013)

Jennifer Lopez singles chronology
"Papi" (2011)	"T.H.E. (The Hardest Ever)" (2011)	"Dance Again" (2012)

Music video
- "T.H.E. (The Hardest Ever)" on YouTube

"T.H.E. (The Hardest Ever)" is a song by American rapper will.i.am, featuring vocals from British singer Mick Jagger of The Rolling Stones and American singer Jennifer Lopez. The song was released via the iTunes Store on November 20, 2011, just hours after its debut at the American Music Awards. The music video for the song was released on December 12, 2011. The song was intended as the lead single from will.i.am's fourth studio album, #willpower, but it was ultimately omitted from the album.

== Background ==
will.i.am first announced the song via his Twitter account, before announcing it via various online media. Links to a demo version of the song were made available via Dipdive and Google+. On November 18, Will released the cover art for the single, using it as his Twitter avatar and background. The song was premiered live on November 20, 2011, live at the 2011 American Music Awards at the Nokia Theater. The performance included will.i.am and Lopez performing live, and Jagger performing via video link. The song was made available on iTunes immediately following the AMA performance. The song was produced by Audiobot, Dallas Austin and will.i.am, as well as Jimmy Iovine. will.i.am originally presented the track to Iovine without the featured artists, as a finished work, and was caught off guard by his request to add performers to the song. In response, he threw out Jagger's name among possible collaborators because he thought it would never happen. Iovine ended up producing Jagger's vocals - it was the first time he had produced in decades. Immediately after the AMA performance, will.i.am thanked Fighting Gravity via Twitter. will.i.am also performed the song live at the American Giving Awards on December 10. Neither Lopez nor Jagger appeared.

The song was originally released as part of will.i.am's fourth studio album, #willpower. The album was originally scheduled for release in September 2012, but was delayed several times and scheduled for released on April 19, 2013. When the final track listing with all its features was confirmed on April 11, 2013 by Rap-Up the song was not included on the album.

== Critical reception ==
The song received mostly negative-to-mixed reviews from music critics.

Simon Vozick-Levinson wrote a mixed review for Rolling Stone, stating that on the single will.i.am "strews dodgy rhymes ("I woke up in the morning/Hard like morning wood in the morning") over diamond-bright synths, while J. Lo handles the efficient hook. It all feels a bit perfunctory – except for Mick's guest verse, a kitschy delight delivered in a "Midnight Rambler" snarl.

The website DJ Booth also gave to the song a mixed review, writing that "this tough-as-nails cut finds Will, "Audiobot" and Dallas Austin teaming up to craft a danceable synth-percussion beat to back the B.E.P. mastermind as he delivers his trademark blend of Auto-Tuned singing and guilty-pleasure punchline lyricism. After a tuneful guest verse from J-Lo (who also lends her vocals to the chorus), the Rolling Stones frontman grabs the mic to flaunt his considerable swagger (and his poor math skills: "Hard like geometry, trigonometry / This is crazy—psychology") in a gruff closing 16."

Billboard's Chris Payne wrote that "The concept sounds crazy, but Will.i.am is the perfect studio whiz to oversee the commotion. The master of ceremonies adds to the fun by referencing "Back to the Future" to the Wu-Tang Clan to Dallas Cowboys owner Jerry Jones in his opening verse."

Magazine No Ripcord laments in writer Joe River's write-up of the song that "The fact thousands and thousands of years of human achievement and progress have led to this moment makes me want to take a vow of silence and live in a kibbutz" and that it makes him want to "[throw] [him]self off Mount Everest".

Entertainment Weekly writer Melissa Maerz stated in the magazine's write-up of the song "The hardest thing about this electro track? Liking it."

== Commercial performance ==
The song debuted on the US Billboard Hot 100 at #36 for the chart week of December 10, 2011 with 70,000 copies sold. In its second week, it dropped 54 slots to 90, and later fell off the chart. It has since re-entered the chart, reaching 61. The song also debuted at number 10 on the Canadian Hot 100 the same week. On the week ending February 3, 2012, a pre-release cover version of the track by Kings of Pop entered the UK Singles Chart at number forty. The version charted on digital downloading alone, charting in the absence of the original (scheduled for release on February 5) - also peaks of number three and number twelve on the independent releases chart and R&B chart. Two weeks later the original version of the song was released in the UK and it charted at #3 on the UK Singles Chart.

== Music video ==
Will.i.am tweeted that a portion of the video was filmed on October 17, 2011 in Los Angeles. On October 24, he tweeted that he had hurt himself during filming. Lopez filmed her part in the video on and around October 30, 2011. After the song's November 20 AMA debut, MTV reported that the video, which was shot both in Los Angeles and in London, was expected to premiere before the end of November. The video was directed by Rich Lee. Will released the music video on December 12 with a link to Google+. A few hours later Jagger tweeted that the official debut of the music video would occur that evening on Extra. Lopez tweeted a link to the video on December 14 on Vevo. A critic at RyanSeacrest.com described the video as "out of this world – literally". Ryan Seacrest tweeted: "the new @iamwill @JLo @MickJagger video requires u set your computer to warp speed". The video begins with will.i.am. sending a text to Mick Jagger and trying to work out his exercises, when he starts running through walls by foot, bicycle, motorbike, car, plane, train, rocket, which then converts into a spaceship. Meanwhile, Lopez is seen on the walls while will.i.am. is driving past them and she also appears on the TV screen inside the spaceship and in the outer part of the galaxy. During the end, Jagger appears on the galaxy finishing the song while Lopez does the belly dance and kept on dancing while Jagger finishes the song. The music video features product placement for HTC, BMW, Beats by Dr. Dre, Siemens Velaro, and the Chrysler 300.

== Track listing ==
- Digital download
1. "T.H.E. (The Hardest Ever)" (Explicit Version) – 4:47
2. "T.H.E. (The Hardest Ever)" (Clean Version) - 4:07
3. "Go Home" (featuring Mick Jagger and Wolfgang Gartner) – 4:36
- Digital download — Remix
1. "T.H.E. (The Hardest Ever)" (Z-Trip Remix) – 5:18
- German CD single
1. "T.H.E. (The Hardest Ever)" – 4:47
2. "T.H.E. (The Hardest Ever)" (instrumental) – 4:39

== Credits and personnel ==
Credits adapted from "T.H.E. (The Hardest Ever)" CD single liner notes.

- will.i.am – songwriter, producer, synthesizers, drum programming, recording, engineer
- Audiobot – songwriter, producer, synthesizers, drum programming
- Dallas Austin – songwriter, producer
- Jimmy Iovine – vocal production
- Jennifer Lopez - lead vocals
- Josh Lopez – guitar
- Padraic "Padlock" Kerin – recording, engineer
- Dylan "3-D" Dresdow – mixing
- Mike Fontane – mixing assistant
- Jaime Martinez – mixing assistant

== Charts ==
=== Weekly charts ===
Chart (2011–12)	Peak position
Australia (ARIA)	57
Australia Urban (ARIA)	17
Austria (Ö3 Austria Top 40)	19
Belgium (Ultratip Bubbling Under Flanders)	5
Belgium (Ultratip Bubbling Under Wallonia)	6
Brazil (Billboard Hot 100)	50
Brazil (Billboard Hot Pop Songs)	4
Canada (Canadian Hot 100)	10
Canada CHR/Top 40 (Billboard)	30
Canada Hot AC (Billboard)	50
Euro Digital Songs (Billboard)	7
Ireland (IRMA)	13
Romania (Romanian Top 100)	80
Scottish Singles Sales (Official Charts)	6
South Korea International Singles (Gaon)	34
Switzerland (Schweizer Hitparade)	41
UK Singles (Official Charts)	3
UK Hip Hop/R&B (Official Charts)	1
US Billboard Hot 100	36
US Billboard Pop Songs	31
US Billboard Latin Songs	45

=== Year-end charts ===
Chart (2012)	Position
Canada (Canadian Hot 100)	78
UK Singles Chart	100

== Certifications ==
Region	Certification	Certified units/sales
United Kingdom (BPI)	Silver	200,000^{^}
^{^} Shipments figures based on certification alone.

== Release history ==
Region	Date	Format
United States	November 20, 2011	Digital download
United States	December 6, 2011	Top 40/Mainstream radio
Germany	January 3, 2012	Digital download
Germany	February 3, 2012	CD single
United Kingdom	February 5, 2012	Digital download
