= Reach for the Stars (will.i.am song) =

"Reach for the Stars (Mars Edition)"

Promotional single by will.i.am

from the album #willpower
- Released: August 28, 2012
- Genre: Orchestral; ambient
- Length: 4:21
- Label: will.i.am; Interscope
- Songwriters: William Adams; Kenny "Audiobot" Oliver; Onlee Gill
- Producers: will.i.am; Audiobot (co-producer); Dr. Luke

"Reach for the Stars" (and their instrumental-driven version subtitled "Mars Edition" and "NASA Edition"), is a song written, produced and recorded by American recording artist will.i.am in commemoration of the landing of the Curiosity rover on the planet Mars. First released on August 28, 2012 as a promotional single, the song also appears on the deluxe edition of his fourth studio album #willpower (2013). "Reach for the Stars (Mars Edition)" became the first song in history to be broadcast from another planet, completing a journey of more than 300 million miles between Mars and Earth.

== Background and development ==
"Reach for the Stars" was written in February 2011, after NASA asked will.i.am to write and produce a song for the Curiosity rover's landing on Mars. The songwriter said that the experience with NASA administrator Charles Bolden discussing the possibility of broadcasting a song from Mars was "surreal", The song is part of NASA's educational outreach, with will.i.am stating that the song "aims to encourage youth to study science." Rather than produce a song via the computer, will.i.am said that he wanted to show "human collaboration", which featured a 40-piece orchestra. He added that "people in my field aren't supposed to try and execute something classical, or orchestral, so I wanted to break that stigma, [and have something] that would be timeless and translated in different cultures."

NASA confirmed during the Mars Science Laboratory launch tweet-up on November 24, 2011 that it partnered with will.i.am to deliver a song for Curiosity's landing. After being uploaded to the rover, which landed near the equator of Mars, the song was broadcast live from the planet, completing a journey of more than 300 million miles (approximately 482 million kilometers). It became the first song in history to be broadcast from another planet and the second song to be broadcast in space, after the Beatles' "Across the Universe" was beamed into space by NASA in 2008.

== Track listing ==
- Digital download
1. "Reach for the Stars (Mars Edition)" – 4:21

== Credits and personnel ==
- will.i.am – co-writer, producer, recording
- Jordan Miller – vocals
- Lil Jon – background vocals
- Dante Santiago – background vocals
- Dr. Luke – producer

== Release history ==
Region	Date	Format	Label
United States	August 28, 2012	Digital download	will.i.am Music, Interscope Records
United Kingdom	September 5, 2012	Digital download	Polydor Records

== See also ==
- Music in space
