= Doreen Lorenzo =

American writer

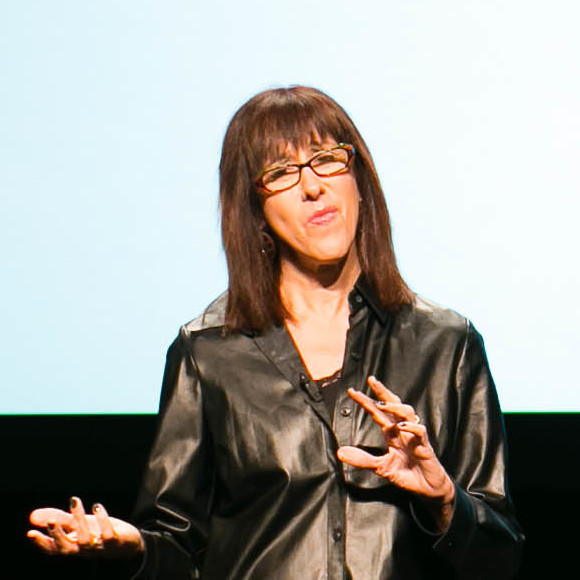
- Lorenzo - PopTech 2014 - Rebellion - Camden, Maine
- Born: July 1957 (age 69)
- Education: Stony Brook University; Boston University
- Employers: Frog Design Inc. (1997–2013); Quirky (company) (2013–2014); Vidlet (2015–present); University of Texas (2016–present)
- Board member of: The Foundry; humanLearning; The Network of Giving; Reaction Housing; Shop Vida; SKU
- Website: doreenlorenzo.com

Doreen Lorenzo (born 1957) is an American thought leader on design and innovation. She has been president of the companies Frog Design Inc. and Quirky, and was the marketing director for Power Computing, manufacturer of "Mac Clones" based in Round Rock, Texas.

== Upbringing and education ==
Lorenzo has mentioned the importance of receiving strong support from her parents. In her own words,

Their view was, whatever you want to do, we're fine with it... My father told me, 'Don't ever say no to anything.' That is always in the back of my mind, and it's something that I use in leadership, too. You're presented with an opportunity. Maybe you've never taken on a challenge like that before. But don't say no. You take that leap and you take that risk.

While at high school, Lorenzo was involved in theater, public speaking and the school's newspaper. She has described herself as "always a very outgoing personality" while at school, and she tended to gravitate towards positions of leadership. She studied at the State University of New York's Stony Brook University as an undergraduate, and earned a master's degree in communication and media studies from Boston University's College of Communication.

== Career ==
Lorenzo enjoyed working in film and video, and originally wanted to be a filmmaker. As a freelance industrial-video producer, she produced a variety of films, ranging from commercials to corporate videos, independent films, and documentaries. In the 1990s, she viewed the Internet as a "powerful new way to deliver content" and a "primary communication channel for our society". Lorenzo started working at Power Computing in 1995. In 1997, Lorenzo was the marketing director at Power when Steve Jobs, the then-interim CEO for Apple Inc, terminated the Mac-cloning enterprise. Subsequently, Apple bought the core assets of Power for $100 million in Apple stock. Power sold-off remaining assets and laid-off approximately 500 employees, many of whom were hired only months before.

The user interface firm she hired to launch the company's online store was acquired by Frog Design Inc. In 1997, Frog's founder, Hartmut Esslinger, asked Lorenzo to lead the company's digital media section. She eventually became the president of the company's digital media group, which created commercial websites and graphical user interfaces. Lorenzo is credited with helping the company to develop "from a boutique design firm to a global design consultancy". She worked at Frog for sixteen years: she was promoted from her digital media role to chief operations officer, then was president for seven years. As president, Lorenzo was involved in "driving strategy, overseeing worldwide operations and delivery, and leading the design firm to record growth".

In October 2013, Lorenzo joined the crowd-sourced product company Quirky. She resigned from the company 15 months later, in December 2014. Quirky filed for Chapter 11 bankruptcy in the Southern District of New York in November 2015. The Harvard Business Review cited 4 reasons for Quirky's demise: not enough outstanding inventions in its inventory, issues regarding quality control due to Open Innovation, a failure to reach economies of scale and an aversion by participating inventors to overbearing managerial control.

In 2015, Lorenzo returned to her hometown of Austin, Texas. Lorenzo has been a board member of the special-effects software company The Foundry, the knowledge management company humanLearning, the Edmonton-based charitable facilitator The Network of Giving, the disaster housing business Reaction Housing (which was established by a former employee of Frog) and the clothing company Shop Vida, which invests some of its revenue into educating factory workers. Lorenzo is also an investor, mentor, and board member of the Austin accelerator SKU. Lorenzo co-founded Vidlet, a mobile video insights company, alongside former Frog employees Patricia Roller and Nate Pagel, as well as Kieran Farr, the founder of Vidcaster. In 2016, Lorenzo became the founding Director for the Center for Integrated Design at the University of Texas. She became assistant dean of the university's School of Design and Creative Technologies in 2017, and was named one of "15 Innovators Reshaping Texas" by Texas Monthly in February 2018.

Lorenzo acts as a resource for business publications and often speaks at conferences, including Techonomy (2011, 2012), TwilioCon (2012), the Dell Women's Entrepreneurs Network (2013), the Austin Center for Design's "Social Innovation and Design Education Speaker Series" (2014), the Duncan Anderson Design Department Gallery's lecture series at California State University, Long Beach (2014), BRITE (2015) and the Ottawa Festivals Pitchfest and Expo (2015). She has contributed to ABC News, Bloomberg Radio and Fortune, and has been quoted by Fast Company and The New York Times, amongst other publications. She writes a column called "Designing Women" for Fast Company. She has been on the World Economic Forum's Network of Global Agenda Councils on Emerging Technologies (2011–2012) and Emerging Multinationals (2013 – present), and is currently on the advisory council for the Cockrell School of Engineering's Innovation Center at the University of Texas at Austin.

In 2014, she was a speaker at PopTech, where she spoke about empathy, compassion and the management of a creative team. She was also invited to speak at a panel discussion on the sharing economy, hosted by Spencer Ante, the co-founder of WhoWeUse, in New York City. In 2015, Lorenzo was on the jury for Cooper Hewitt, Smithsonian Design Museum's annual list of National Design Award recipients. In November 2016, Fast Company published Lorenzo's interview with Cher, and Lorenzo interviewed the singer and actress during the Fast Company Innovation Festival at New York University's Skirball Center ("Cher + Doreen Lorenzo on Being Human in the Age of the Algorithm"). As one of the first female leaders in the modern business of product design and innovation, she has been described as a "strategic thinker" with a passion for "helping creative people succeed". Lorenzo spoke at South by Southwest in 2016, 2017, and 2018. She also spoke at the C2 conference in 2016, and the Fast Company Innovation Festival in 2017.
