= Wink (platform) =

Home automation platform

- Original authors: Quirky (2014-2015); Flex (2015-2017) i.am+ (2017-present)
- Developers: Wink, Inc.
- Release: June 23, 2014; 12 years ago
- Operating system: iOS; Android watchOS (Apple Watch); Android Wear
- Available in: English
- Type: Home automation
- Website: wink.com

Wink is an American brand of software and hardware products that connects with and controls smart home devices from a consolidated user interface. Wink, Labs Inc., which develops and markets Wink, was founded in 2014 as a spin-off from invention incubator Quirky. After Quirky went through bankruptcy proceedings, it sold Wink to Flex in 2015. As of 2016, the Wink software is connected to 1.3 million devices. In July 2017, Flex sold Wink to i.am+ for $59 million.

== Corporate history ==
Wink, Labs Inc. was founded at Quirky, an incubator program for inventions that relies on crowd-sourced product ideas. Wink, Labs was originally created as part of a collaboration with General Electric to control co-branded smart home products like air-conditioners. It was founded by current CTO Nathan Smith and received about $20 million in funding. The company spent twelve months working with fifteen electronics manufacturing companies to offer about 60 Wink-compatible products by July 2014. Wink was spun-off from Quirky in June 2014.

According to Quirky, Wink products were in 300,000 homes by 2015. In April 2015 Wink experienced a security problem that made many of its smart home hubs go offline or break, forcing the company to issue a recall. The recall caused a several-month inventory backlog and subsequent shortage of the Wink hub. Due to financial difficulties, due in part to the recall, Quirky began looking for buyers to sell Wink to in 2015. That November, after Quirky went through bankruptcy proceedings, it sold Wink for $15 million to Flextronics (now called Flex), to whom Quirky owed $18.7 million. Flex was Wink's primary supplier of firmware and hardware. As of 2016, 1.3 million devices were connected to Wink.

On July 27, 2017, in its First Quarter Report, Flex announced that it had sold its interest in Wink for $59 million, representing a $38.7 million gain on the balance sheet. Although the Report described the purchaser as "an unrelated third-party venture backed company", stories circulated in the technology press identifying the purchaser as i.am+, the technology firm founded by the performer Will.i.am.

On May 6, 2020, Wink announced that they would be updating their platform from being free from monthly fees to charging a monthly service fee in order to continue using the Wink app, hub and devices. Users were notified that they had until May 13, 2020, after which Wink devices would be inaccessible from the app, and all voice control, API and automations would be disabled. The deadline for subscriptions was delayed, eventually taking effect in July 2020.

On January 25, 2021, Wink suffered a wide spread outage. Remote control and cloud automation features were broken. Some users reported a complete and total outage including local control of their smarthubs, contrary to the company's public statements. The outage persisted for nine days. Wink resumed operation on February 3, 2021, posting on their blog that customers would receive a 25% discount on January and February's monthly dues. No cause for the incident was provided.

== Products ==
Homescreen of the Wink app for iOS

Wink connects with third-party smart home devices associated with the Internet of Things, such as thermostats, door locks, ceiling fans, and Wi-Fi-enabled lights, to provide a single user interface on a mobile app or via a wall-mounted screen, called Relay. This allows the user to remotely control those devices. The mobile app is free, while consumers pay for a Wink Hub, or Wink Relay, which connects with smart devices in the home. The hubs integrate with competing software standards used by different manufacturers. Wink integrates with software from automated home device brands, such as Canary, which markets an app-controlled home system. In February 2016, new features were introduced to allow Wink to operate on the local network, in case a user's internet connection is down. In June 2016, compatibility with Uber, Fitbit, and IFTTT, was added to the Relay product. A second generation version of the Wink Hub was released in November 2016. Compatibility with Uber has long been abandoned as of January 2021; as has the Wink Relay and sales of its standalone Wink Hub.

The second generation Wink Hub supports most smart home devices with Zigbee, ZWave, Lutron Clear Connect, and Kidde protocols. Wink 2 also added Bluetooth Low Energy, 5 GHz Wi-Fi radio, an Ethernet port, and 512MB of memory.

In October 2017, the Wink Lookout home security system was announced, consisting of open/close sensors, motion sensors, a siren, and the Wink hub. The Wink Lookout, released on October 31, 2017, was the last major product released by the company as of January 2021.

== Reception ==
In a 2014 competitive review comparing Wink to SmartThings, CNET said Wink was cheaper and supported more wireless standards, but had fewer and less reliable sensors to support automation. The article recommended SmartThings for tech-savvy users and Wink for general consumers. In an August 2014 review, CNET gave Wink a 7.7 score out of 10. It complimented the product for being close to the "ideal" whole-home security and automation service, but lamented that it wasn't "a perfect replacement for some of the more sophisticated standalone smart home device apps." A January 2015 review of Wink by Tom's Guide rated the product a 7/10, "very good". The reviewer criticized the application for not giving as much control over individual smart home electronics as their own apps, but praised Wink for providing "an easy way for people to dip their toes into smart home systems."

A review in PCMAG of the Wink Hub 2 said it was easy to use and compatible with many devices, but had no battery backup or USB ports. Under "Bottom Line" the review said, "Works with virtually every wireless protocol out there and supports dual-band Wi-Fi. Installation and device pairing is quick and easy." It gave the Hub 2 4.5 out of 5 stars and named it its new Editors' Choice for home automation hubs. In contrast, CNET gave the device three stars. The reviewer said the device is easy to set up and compatible with many devices, but gave the reviewer error messages. The reviewer was never able to successfully set it up the way she wanted. Tom's Guide gave the Wink Hub 2 7 out of 10. It also said the device was easy to use and compatible with many devices, but missing some advanced features. Tom's Guide said it was good for "basic" smart homes.
