= Rebound (Arty and Mat Zo song) =

Single by Arty and Mat Zo

from the album Anjunabeats Presents Mat Zo 01
- Released: 18 April 2011
- Recorded: 2011
- Genre: Trance
- Length: 7:45
- Label: Anjunabeats

Arty and Mat Zo singles chronology
"Rebound" (2011)	"Mozart" (2011)

Arty singles chronology
"Zara" (2011)	"Rebound" (2011)	"Around the World" (2011)

Mat Zo singles chronology
"Back in Time / Millennia" (2011)	"Rebound" (2011)	"Frequency Flyer" (2011)

"Rebound" is a song by Russian DJ and producer Arty with British producer Mat Zo. It was released by Anjunabeats as a digital download on 18 April 2011.

The track was the 200th release of Anjunabeats, and thus considered to be a landmark release. This track was featured in numerous trance compilations. Later in 2013, the track was illegally sampled in will.i.am's studio album, #willpower.

== Composition and background ==
The track premiered in March 2011 by Above & Beyond as an ID. Its name was revealed later in A State of Trance 2011 and confirmed in TATW 362 as the 200th release of Anjunabeats.

"Rebound" is a progressive trance track of 132 BPM.

== Unlicensed use by will.i.am ==
In 2013, will.i.am sampled the song for his track "Let's Go" featuring Chris Brown. Based on Arty & Mat Zo, will.i.am never cleared the track copyrights with label Anjunabeats, although Arty was listed in the track credits for "Let's Go". From a tweet by Chris Brown, he stated that he didn't know of the track's original source and claimed that he performed the track due to a feature request. will.i.am initially replied with "Who's Matzo?" on a YouTube comment to a listener who pointed out the original track. Arty confirmed in a Facebook statement that he was never contacted by will.i.am's label, Interscope Records, for license agreements considering that the track was made in collaboration with Mat Zo.

During his first official response on the case, he wrote that he contacted Arty after listening to "Rebound" and asked for a collaboration, in which Arty responded that he would be interested in one. Believing that Arty's response would be enough as an okay, will.i.am recorded a new version of the track for "Let's Go". He also stated that he was unaware that "Rebound" was co-created by Mat Zo.

"You can't steal if you credited somebody. He and I communicated. ... It's not my fault he didn't tell me about the other guy. So who is to blame? I didn't know."

— will.i.am. in defense to the accusations

In a later interview with radio station KIIS-FM, will.i.am. admitted stealing from "Rebound" accidentally and that he was confused whether he ever had the rights to use "Rebound" for his song. He stated, "Arty is a dope producer so I wrote this song to 'Rebound' this last year. I got in touch with Arty and showed it to him, did a different version to it 'cause I asked him [to] make it newer 'cause I don't just wanna take your song and rap over it. But he said that after a year's time, "we preferred writing over and using the [original] rebound. Something happened and the clearance... hopefully we resolved the issue". He then contacted the song owners for negotiation, in which the song was removed from the regular edition on his album #willpower and replaced on the deluxe edition with the song "Feelin' Myself".

Later in May and June 2013, Above & Beyond and Mat Zo, respectively, played the original track on Electric Daisy Carnival and made fun of will.i.am.

== Track listing and remixes ==
Digital download
No.	Title	Length
1.	"Rebound" (original mix)	7:45
2.	"Rebound" (radio edit)	3:29

Later in November 2011, a remix by Ukrainian producer Omnia was featured on Anjunabeats Volume 9 as a bonus track.

In 2022, Jason Ross released a remix of the song.

== Release history ==
Region	Date	Format	Label	Reference
Various	18 April 2011	Digital download	Anjunabeats	
