= Quirky (company) =

Company

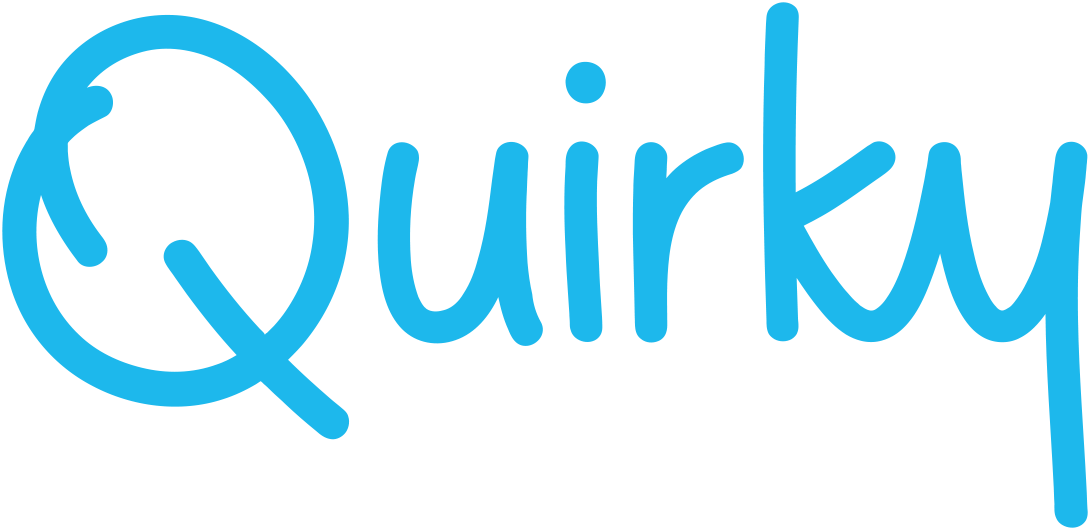
- Company type: Private
- Available in: English
- Headquarters: New York City
- Founder: Ben Kaufman
- Key people: Gina Waldhorn, President
- Parent: Quirky, Inc. (2009-2015); Q Holdings, LLC (2015-present)
- Website: www.quirky.com
- Registration: Optional
- Users: 1.2 million+
- Launched: June 2009; 17 years ago
- Current status: Inactive

Quirky was an invention platform that connected inventors with companies that specialized in a specific product category.

== History ==
Quirky was founded in 2009 by Ben Kaufman.

In April 2010, Quirky received $6.5 million in Series A venture capital funding, led by RRE Ventures. The company later received a $16 million Series B round in August 2011 led by Norwest Venture Partners, and a $68 million Series C round in September 2012 led by Andreessen Horowitz and Kleiner Perkins Caufield & Byers. Then, in November 2013, Quirky raised $79 million in Series D funding from General Electric (GE) as well as its venture investors Andreessen Horowitz, Norwest Venture Partners, RRE, and Kleiner Perkins Caufield & Byers. Part of the deal included a $30 million investment from GE, as well as a partnership to build 30 connected-home gadgets together in the next five years.

In 2011, a reality television series named Quirky debuted on the Sundance Channel following events at the Quirky office.

The May 6, 2012, episode of CNN's The Next List featured CEO Ben Kaufman and the company.

On July 31, 2015, Ben Kaufman stepped down as CEO following a layoff of 111 employees due to trouble getting funding.

On September 22, 2015, the company filed for Chapter 11 bankruptcy. The company's assets, including its website and most of its products, were bought by Q Holdings for $4.7 million in late 2015, despite objections from General Electric. Quirky's smart home Wink platform was sold to Flextronics for $15 million in November 2015.

It was announced on February 8, 2016, that the company had new financing and owners.

As of April 24, 2024, Quirky's invention submission platform is not accessible.

== See also ==
- Doreen Lorenzo, the company's former president
