= ThatPower =

"#thatPower"

Single by will.i.am featuring Justin Bieber

from the album #willpower
- Released: March 15, 2013
- Recorded: February 20, 2013
- Studio: Metropolis, London
- Genre: Dance-pop; EDM
- Length: 4:39
- Label: will.i.am Music; Interscope
- Songwriters: William Adams; Damien LeRoy; Justin Bieber
- Producers: will.i.am; Damien Leroy

will.i.am singles chronology
"Scream & Shout" (2012)	"#thatPower" (2013)	"Crazy Kids" (2013)

Justin Bieber singles chronology
"All Around the World" (2013)	"#thatPower" (2013)	"Lolly" (2013)

Music video
- "#thatPower" on YouTube

"#thatPower" (stylized as #thatPOWER) is a song by American musician will.i.am featuring Canadian singer Justin Bieber, taken from his fourth studio album, #willpower. The song was written by the artists alongside Damien Leroy, who produced it with will.i.am. "thatPOWER" was released in the United States and Canada on March 15, 2013, via Interscope Records, as the third single from the album. The song has since charted in several countries. A special version of the song was used for the 2013 NBA Playoffs telecasts on ESPN and ABC and the last day of TV5's primetime sports block on IBC, AKTV. It samples The Power from Snap!.

== Background ==
"#thatPower" was released on YouTube on March 15 and on iTunes on March 18. The song made its radio premiere on Capital FM in the United Kingdom on March 15. Will.i.am tweeted the cover art for the song on March 15. The song was recorded on February 20, 2013, at Metropolis, when Bieber and will.i.am were in London for the 2013 BRIT Awards. The song was released to American Contemporary radio on March 26, 2013. The single sold 108,000 digital downloads in its first week of release.

== Composition ==
Will.i.am described "#thatPower" as up-tempo. MTV's Jocelyn Vena said the song had "lyrical swagger" and noted how "Bieber brings his sweet vocals to the chorus", with a vibe that "recalls Kanye West's 2010 hit, 'Power'". According to The Hollywood Reporter, the song is club-oriented.

== Critical reception ==
"#thatPower" received mixed reviews from music critics. E.E. Bradman for Common Sense Media wrote, "This one's all about the club: With its uptempo four-on-the-floor bass and kick assault, repeated choruses, and surging synths, "#thatPower" sounds and feels more like a remix than the first iteration of a new song." Jody Rosen of Rolling Stone called the song "a wan melody warbled by Bieber over generic 4/4 beats" and gave it two out of five stars, ending his review with "#FAIL."

== Music video ==
On March 21, will.i.am tweeted about how exhausting rehearsals for the video were. On March 25, Capital FM reported that will.i.am was seen taking part in the production of parts of the video for the song in Los Angeles. The official video premiered on April 19, 2013. An alternate "second screen" music video is available through an unlisted YouTube link when the song is tagged via Shazam. The alternate video does not contain audio and is meant to be viewed alongside the original music video in order to spot the differences between the two.

A special version was shot with National Basketball Association (NBA) players, including LeBron James, Dwyane Wade, Kevin Durant, Dwight Howard, Carmelo Anthony and Chris Bosh, to be used as the opening theme introduction for the 2013 NBA Playoffs television broadcasts on ABC and ESPN. The video is also used at various commercial breaks throughout the broadcasts.

== Live performances ==
will.i.am performed the track at Le Grand Journal on April 16, 2013, and it featured his backing dancers. Four days later, he performed the song on The Jonathan Ross Show, doing a similar performance. He performed the song on Dancing with the Stars results show on April 23, 2013, while Justin Bieber's solos played in the background in a video. On May 19, will.i.am and Bieber also performed the song live during the 2013 Billboard Music Awards, in Las Vegas.

== Cover versions ==
A funk and soul-infused version of "#thatPower" was arranged, recorded and performed by Judith Hill, on the television singing competition show The Voice. The performance was held on May 27, 2013, and was broadcast live on NBC. The studio-recorded version was digitally released during the same period.

== Track listing ==
Digital download
No.	Title	Length
1.	"#thatPower" (featuring Justin Bieber)	4:39

CD single
No.	Title	Length
1.	"#thatPower" (featuring Justin Bieber) (radio edit)	4:01
2.	"#thatPower" (instrumental)	4:39

== Charts ==
=== Weekly charts ===
Chart (2013–2014)	Peak position
Australia (ARIA)	6
Austria (Ö3 Austria Top 40)	13
Belgium (Ultratop 50 Flanders)	15
Belgium (Ultratop 50 Wallonia)	9
Canada Hot 100 (Billboard)	6
Canada CHR/Top 40 (Billboard)	10
Canada Hot AC (Billboard)	32
Czech Republic Airplay (ČNS IFPI)	32
Denmark (Tracklisten)	19
Finland (Suomen virallinen lista)	13
France (SNEP)	11
Germany (GfK)	7
Hungary (Dance Top 40)	35
Hungary (Rádiós Top 40)	27
Ireland (IRMA)	5
Israel International Airplay (Media Forest)	10
Italy (FIMI)	19
Japan Hot 100 (Billboard)	27
Mexico (Billboard Mexican Airplay)	8
Mexico Anglo (Monitor Latino)	8
Netherlands (Dutch Top 40)	14
Netherlands (Single Top 100)	17
New Zealand (Recorded Music NZ)	16
Norway (VG-lista)	4
Romania (Airplay 100)	72
Russia Airplay (TopHit)	14
Scottish Singles Sales (Official Charts)	1
Spain (Promusicae)	45
Sweden (Sverigetopplistan)	3
Switzerland (Schweizer Hitparade)	23
UK Singles (Official Charts)	2
UK Dance (Official Charts)	2
UK Hip Hop/R&B (Official Charts)	1
Ukraine Airplay (TopHit)	46
US Billboard Hot 100	17
US Dance Club Songs (Billboard)	10
US Hot Dance/Electronic Songs (Billboard)	3
US Pop Airplay (Billboard)	11
US Rhythmic Airplay (Billboard)	16

=== Year-end charts ===
Chart (2013)	Position
Australia (ARIA)	62
Belgium (Ultratop Flanders)	53
Belgium Dance (Ultratop Flanders)	41
Belgium (Ultratop Wallonia)	35
Belgium Dance (Ultratop Wallonia)	13
Canada (Canadian Hot 100)	67
France (SNEP)	52
Germany (Official German Charts)	68
Netherlands (Dutch Top 40)	55
Netherlands (Single Top 100)	81
Russia Airplay (TopHit)	40
Sweden (Sverigetopplistan)	37
UK Singles (OCC)	65
US Billboard Hot 100	95
US Hot Dance/Electronic Songs (Billboard)	13

== Certifications ==
Region	Certification	Certified units/sales
Australia (ARIA)	2× Platinum	140,000^{^}
Belgium (BRMA)	Gold	15,000^{*}
Brazil (Pro-Música Brasil)	2× Platinum	120,000^{‡}
Germany (BVMI)	Gold	150,000^{‡}
Italy (FIMI)	Platinum	30,000^{‡}
Mexico (AMPROFON)	Platinum	60,000^{*}
New Zealand (RMNZ)	Platinum	15,000^{*}
Sweden (GLF)	Platinum	40,000^{‡}
United Kingdom (BPI)	Gold	400,000^{‡}
United States	—	1,018,369
Streaming
Denmark (IFPI Danmark)	Platinum	1,800,000^{†}
^{*} Sales figures based on certification alone.^{^} Shipments figures based on certification alone.^{‡} Sales+streaming figures based on certification alone.^{†} Streaming-only figures based on certification alone.

== Release history ==
Region	Date	Format	Label	Ref.
Canada	March 18, 2013	Digital download	Universal Music	
United States	March 18, 2013	Digital download	Interscope Records	
United States	March 26, 2013	Mainstream and rhythmic radio	Interscope Records	
Germany	March 29, 2013	Digital download	Universal Music	
United Kingdom	April 3, 2013	Mainstream radio	Polydor Records	
United Kingdom	April 14, 2013	Digital download	Polydor Records	
Germany	April 26, 2013	CD single	Universal Music	
