= Reaching for the Stars (song) =

"Reaching For The Stars"

Song by Will.i.am
- Recorded: August 2012

Reaching for the Stars is a 2012 song by songwriter Will.i.am. The song was written as a tribute to the successful landing of the Mars Science Laboratory on Mars in August 2012 and was rebroadcast by the rover from the surface of mars in the song's debut at the end of that month. Will.i.am said the song "aims to encourage youth to study science".

== See also ==
- Across the Universe
