= I.am+ =

American consumer electronics brand

i.am+
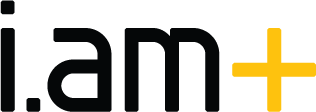
- Industry: Consumer electronics
- Founded: 2013; 13 years ago
- Headquarters: Hollywood, California
- Owner: will.i.am
- Subsidiaries: over.ai; Wink
- Website: iamplus.com

i.am+ is an American technology company based in Los Angeles, California. The company was founded by musician and entrepreneur will.i.am, in 2013 with the mission of "creating wearable products that combine fashion and technology." In 2016, i.am+ acquired Israeli machine learning software company Sensiya, now known as over.ai.

== Products ==
=== i.am+ camera for iPhone 4 ===
In 2012 i.am+ announced a camera accessory for the iPhone 4.

=== dial ===
dial was a SIM-enabled smartwatch available in the UK exclusively through Three. Featuring a voice-enabled AI named AneedA, the smartwatch was the first of its kind with a conversational operating system. The dial did not need to be tethered to a smart phone and could send calls and SMS messages independently. Included with the dial was music streaming service with over 20 million songs.

=== EPs ===
i.am+ EPs are high-end Bluetooth headphones. The circular and phones form was supposedly designed to echo their namesake vinyl records. The EPs feature a woven fabric cable and a magnetic clip so they can be worn around the neck when not in use.

=== BUTTONS ===
The EPs were replaced with the 2nd generation of bluetooth headphones (now called i.am+ BUTTONS). i.am+ BUTTONS launched in November 2016.

=== over.ai ===
In July 2016, i.am+ acquired Israeli company Sensiya, now over.ai, to continue research and development of their machine learning and natural language understanding technologies.

=== Wink ===
In July 2017, i.am+ purchased Wink, a software and hardware manufacturer, from Flex in a $38.7 million deal.

=== Earin ===
In January 2018 i.am+ attempted to acquire Swedish earbuds startup Earin. The acquisition later fell through for undisclosed reasons.

=== Omega Voice Assistant ===
In October 2018, i.am+ announced a new platform agnostic voice assistant called Omega.

In 2018, Majid Al Futtaim formed a partnership with i.am+ to introduce its omega technology in the Middle east, Asia, and Africa.

== Funding ==
In November 2017, the company secured $117 million in funding. Prior to this, it had raised $89 million from a group, including Salesforce.

== Controversy ==
In late 2019, the company was the subject of multiple tax liens, with the California Franchise Tax Board alleging over $500,000 in delinquent taxes and the IRS alleging $1.78 million in delinquent taxes and interest.
