= Feelin' Myself (will.i.am song) =

2013 single by will.i.am

Single by will.i.am featuring Miley Cyrus, French Montana, Wiz Khalifa and DJ Mustard

from the album #willpower
- Released: November 26, 2013
- Studio: Record Plant (Los Angeles, CA)
- Genre: West Coast hip hop; electro-hop
- Length: 4:13
- Label: Interscope
- Songwriters: William Adams; Jean-Baptiste; Dijon McFarlane; Karim Kharbouch; Mikely Adam; Cameron Jibril Thomaz
- Producer: DJ Mustard

will.i.am singles chronology
"Something Really Bad" (2013)	"Feelin' Myself" (2013)	"It's My Birthday" (2014)

Miley Cyrus singles chronology
"Real and True" (2013)	"Feelin' Myself" (2013)	"Adore You" (2013)

French Montana singles chronology
"I Swear" (2013)	"Feelin' Myself" (2013)	"Loyal" (2013)

Wiz Khalifa singles chronology
"Think About It" (2013)	"Feelin' Myself" (2013)	"Or Nah" (2014)

DJ Mustard singles chronology
"This D" (2013)	"Feelin' Myself" (2013)	"Left, Right" (2013)

Music video
- "Feelin' Myself" on YouTube

Professional ratings
Review scores
Source	Rating
Digital Spy	3/5 stars
Rolling Stone	2/5 stars

"Feelin' Myself" is a song by American rapper & singer will.i.am featuring singer Miley Cyrus, rappers French Montana and Wiz Khalifa, and record producer DJ Mustard. It was released on November 26, 2013, by Interscope Records as the lead single from the re-release of will.i.am's fourth studio album #willpower (2013). It was written by its performers along with Jean-Baptiste, while production was handled by non-performing guest artist Mustard. An accompanying music video was premiered on November 26, 2013. The songs instrumental was noted for its similarity to "Gettin Tho'd" by rapper Paul Wall, which was also produced by Mustard. The song peaked at number ninety-six on the Billboard Hot 100.

Outside the United States, the song peaked within the top ten of the charts in Belgium, the Republic of Ireland and the United Kingdom. "Feelin' Myself" has been described as a club-oriented track which features its performers trading verses over a "glossy" West Coast hip hop beat. Despite generally negative reception, critics praised the song's production.

== Background ==
"Feelin' Myself" marks the last of three collaborations between will.i.am and Cyrus in 2013. She first appeared on his track "Fall Down" for the original version of his fourth studio album, #willpower (2013). will.i.am later appeared as a songwriter and producer on the track "Do My Thang" for Cyrus' fourth studio album, Bangerz (2013).

The song was also featured in a commercial for Samsung's Milk Music app, which was later discontinued.

== Critical reception ==
Lewis Corner of Digital Spy gave the song a moderate review stating: "The final result may be devoid of any musical credibility, but it's annoyingly catchy - and much like will.i.am's strange anti-carb diet shoutout, we've got a feeling this is going to be just as hard to give up in 2014." Spin wrote the song features "bleepy, stripped-bare production from ratchet-music man of the hour DJ Mustard". James Shotwell of Under the Gun Review felt that the collaboration with the featured artists "didn't bring anything to the table you haven't heard before, and most of it has been said better on at least a dozen other songs. Will.i.am has gone from being on the forefront of pop music to barely staying on the bandwagon, and it’s getting more disappointing with each release."

== Music video ==
An accompanying music video for "Feelin' Myself," directed by Michael Jurkovac with graphic designer Pasha Shapiro, was premiered through Vevo on November 26, 2013. All four artists appear in the video.

== Track listing ==
- Digital download
1. "Feelin' Myself" (featuring Miley Cyrus, Wiz Khalifa, French Montana and DJ Mustard) (Explicit)
2. "Feelin' Myself" (featuring Miley Cyrus, Wiz Khalifa, French Montana and DJ Mustard) (Clean)

== Charts ==
=== Weekly charts ===
Chart (2013–2014)	Peak position
Australia (ARIA)	34
Belgium (Ultratip Bubbling Under Flanders)	2
Belgium Urban (Ultratop Flanders)	12
Belgium (Ultratip Bubbling Under Wallonia)	2
Denmark (Tracklisten)	36
France (SNEP)	50
Germany (GfK)	55
Ireland (IRMA)	3
Lebanon (The Official Lebanese Top 20)	18
New Zealand (Recorded Music NZ)	16
Scottish Singles Sales (Official Charts)	2
UK Singles (Official Charts)	2
UK Hip Hop/R&B (Official Charts)	1
US Billboard Hot 100	96
US Hot R&B/Hip-Hop Songs (Billboard)	29
US Rhythmic Airplay (Billboard)	19

=== Year-end charts ===
Chart (2014)	Position
France (SNEP)	198
UK Singles (Official Charts Company)	49
US Hot R&B/Hip-Hop Songs (Billboard)	86

== Certifications ==
Region	Certification	Certified units/sales
Brazil (Pro-Música Brasil)	Gold	30,000^{‡}
New Zealand (RMNZ)	Platinum	15,000^{*}
Sweden (GLF)	Gold	20,000^{‡}
United Kingdom (BPI)	Platinum	600,000^{‡}
Streaming
Denmark (IFPI Danmark)	Gold	900,000^{†}
^{*} Sales figures based on certification alone.^{‡} Sales+streaming figures based on certification alone.^{†} Streaming-only figures based on certification alone.
