= Will.i.am =

American rapper (born 1975)

will.i.am
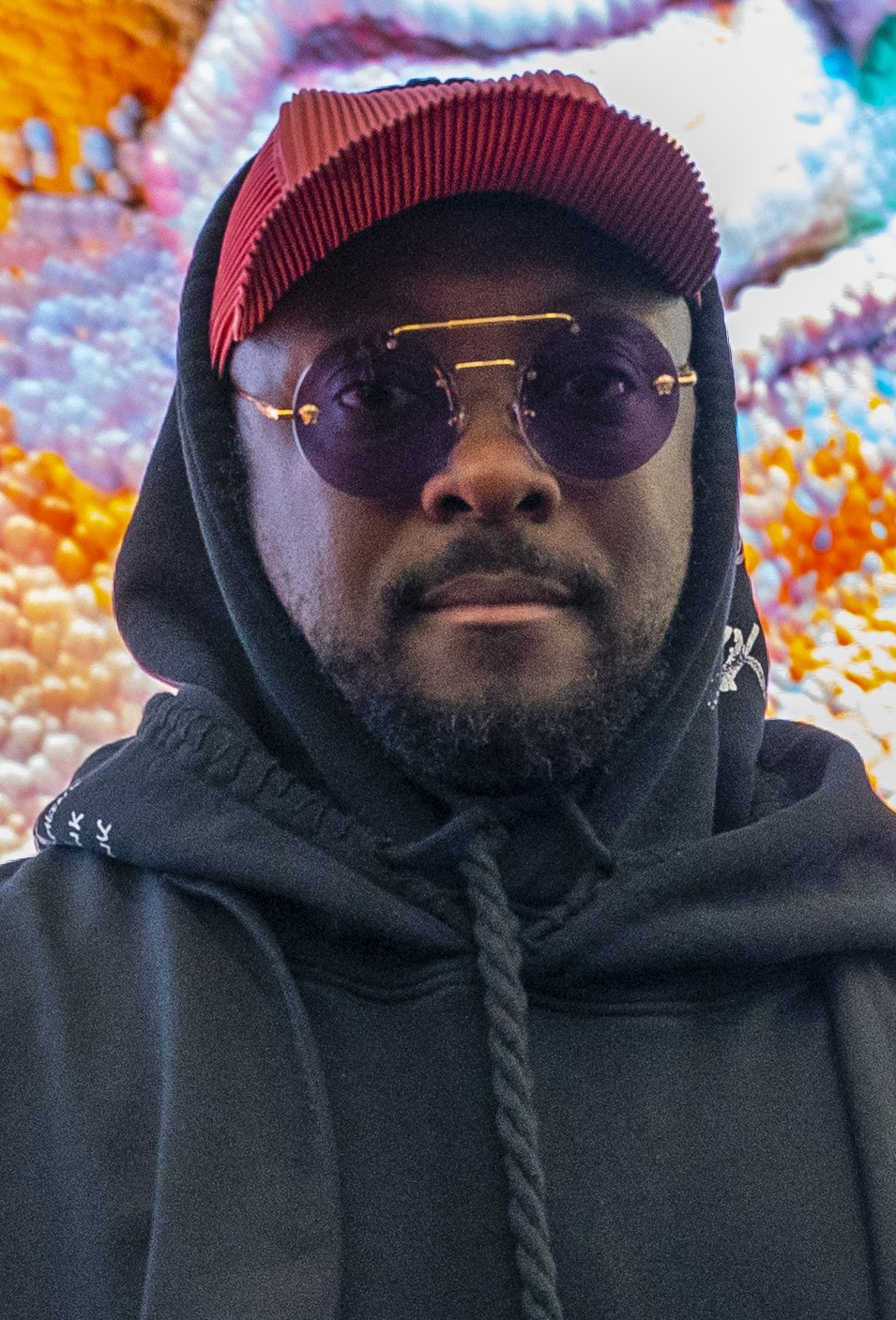
- will.i.am at the World Economic Forum in 2023
- Born: William James Adams Jr. March 15, 1975 (age 51); Los Angeles, California, U.S.
- Other names: Will 1X; illwilly; Willonex; Zuper Blahq
- Occupations: Rapper; singer; songwriter; record producer; entrepreneur; actor
- Years active: 1988–present
- Organization: i.am+
- Works: Discography; filmography; production
- Relatives: Lynn Cain (uncle)
- Awards: Full list
- Musical career
- Genres: Pop rap; hip-house; R&B; EDM
- Instruments: Vocals; keyboards; bass guitar; drums
- Labels: Epic; E1; Interscope; Beat Generation; will.i.am; Barely Breaking Even; Atlantic; Ruthless
- Member of: Black Eyed Peas
- Formerly of: Atban Klann; Jawbreakers
- Website: will.i.am

Signature
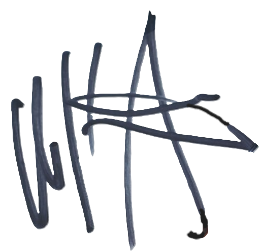

William Adams (born March 15, 1975), known professionally as will.i.am (pronounced "will I am" and stylized in all lowercase), is an American rapper, singer, songwriter, and record producer. He is the frontman of the musical group Black Eyed Peas, which he formed in 1995 alongside fellow rappers apl.de.ap and Taboo. The group has released nine studio albums, and saw their highest success with the pop rap albums Elephunk (2003), Monkey Business (2005), The E.N.D. (2009), and The Beginning (2010), during which time he shared lead vocals with fellow singer Fergie.

As a solo artist, Adams signed with Atlantic Records to release his debut album Lost Change (2001). He later signed to Barely Breaking Even to release his second album Must B 21 (2003). Both albums failed to chart. After gaining success with the Black Eyed Peas, he signed with Interscope Records to release his third album, Songs About Girls (2007). His third effort moderately entered the US Billboard 200 — becoming his first solo project to do so — and spawned the US Billboard Hot 100-top 40 single "I Got It From My Mama". His fourth album, #willpower (2013), peaked at number nine on the Billboard 200, and was supported by the Billboard Hot 100-top five hit, "Scream & Shout" (with Britney Spears). In addition, he guest appeared on Fergie's 2006 single "Fergalicious" and Usher's 2010 single "OMG", which peaked at numbers two and one on the Billboard Hot 100, respectively.

From both his solo career and groupwork with the Black Eyed Peas, he has had 41 UK singles chart-top 40 entries since 1998, and has sold 9.4 million singles in the country. He founded a self-titled record label in 1998, which has signed artists including LMFAO, Kelis, and Macy Gray. Outside of music, Adams founded the technology company i.am+ in 2013; he has also served as a panelist and mentor on the reality competition series The Voice UK (2012–present), The Voice Australia (2014), and The Voice Kids (2017–2023). He is the recipient of seven Grammy Awards, a Latin Grammy Award, and a Daytime Emmy Award.

== Early life ==
William James Adams Jr. was born in Los Angeles, California, on March 15, 1975, the son of an African-American mother Debra (née Cain) and Jamaican father William James Adams Sr. He has never met his father; he was raised by his mother in the Estrada Courts housing projects in the Boyle Heights neighborhood of Los Angeles, where they were among the few African-Americans living in a predominantly Hispanic community. He did not discover his full birth name until he was 25.

His mother encouraged him to be unique and to avoid conforming to the tendencies of the other youths in the neighborhood. To guide his musical career, she sent him to public schools in the more affluent West Los Angeles area such as Paul Revere Charter Middle School, which was one hour-long bus trip away. He attended Palisades Charter High School. During high school, he started going to raves with classmate Pasquale Rotella. In a later interview with Los Angeles Times, Adams mentioned that the secrecy surrounding the whereabouts of raves was what made raving special and different from the mainstream. Adams' maternal uncle is former National Football League (NFL) player Lynn Cain.

== Music career ==
=== 1988–2000: Formations and the Black Eyed Peas ===
As a high school student in the early 1990s, will.i.am was involved in a breakdancing crew called Tribal Nation. Later, he and Apl.de.Ap (Allan Pineda Lindo, Jr.) – another member of Tribal Nation – began making music together as Atban Klann (which was an acronym for A Tribe Beyond a Nation). Eazy-E signed them to his label, Ruthless Records, in 1992. At the time, Will was known as "Will 1X". Atban Klann's first song, "Merry Muthafuckin' Xmas", was included on Eazy-E's extended play 5150: Home 4 tha Sick (1992). Afterward, the trio began recording an album, Grass Roots with the help of producers Mookie Mook and DJ Motiv8, but the album was never released due to Eazy-E's death in 1995. Subsequently, they changed their name to Black Eyed Pods, and Will replaced Dante with Jaime Gomez, better known under his stage name of Taboo. In 1997, they once again changed their name, this time to the Black Eyed Peas, and began recording their first album, Behind the Front, with the help of soul singer Kim Hill. They were soon signed to Interscope Records, and released their debut single, "Joints & Jam", in early 1998. The album was successful enough for the group's contract to be renewed, and in 2000, a second album, Bridging the Gap, was released.

=== 2000–2003: Lost Change, Elephunk and Must B 21 ===
Following the release of Bridging the Gap, Will began recording his first solo release, Lost Change, which was the official soundtrack to the film of the same name. Featuring collaborations with Medusa, Planet Asia and Terry Dexter, the album was a critical success. In November 2001, work began on a third Black Eyed Peas album, Elephunk. Development of the album began on November 2, 2001, and was released just under two years later in 2003. At the time of development, only will.i.am, apl.de.ap and Taboo were to feature on the album. During the production of "Shut Up" (the second single released from the album), they realized that a female vocal would work well with the song. Originally, Nicole Scherzinger (lead singer of the Pussycat Dolls) was approached to make a guest appearance on the record. She was forced to decline because she already was signed to a contract with Eden's Crush. Danté Santiago then introduced Fergie to will.i.am, whom she impressed with her vocal talents. She immediately bonded with the band and became a permanent member of the Peas, and her photo was printed onto the album cover. Lyricist Robbie Fisher, who has been working closely with the band since the beginning stages of the album, composed nine out of the fourteen tracks. In the United States, Elephunk reached number 14 on the Billboard 200 and became their first album to chart in the top 15. It gained even more commercial success internationally, particularly in the UK Album Charts where it reached number 3. It has sold over 1.6 million copies in the UK and 8.5 million copies worldwide.

After the success of Elephunk, the group was approached by Electronic Arts to feature some of their music on the 2004 game The Urbz. They remixed some of the tracks on Elephunk and translated it into Simlish; the band also created new tracks for the game. They also feature in the game as playable characters. Elephunk contained their breakthrough commercial single, "Where Is the Love?", in November 2002 (featuring Justin Timberlake, although he did not appear in the video). On the strength of that single and follow-up singles like "Shut Up", Elephunk went on to sell 8.5 million copies worldwide. During this time, Will recorded a second solo album, Must B 21 to similar reception as its predecessor. "Where Is the Love?" and "Shut Up" reached number 1 on the UK Singles chart. "Hey Mama" was used for several advertisements including for Apple and iTunes. "Let's Get It Started" also received universal acclaim in the media section where a cover version of the song appears in the film Hot Tub Time Machine. In 2002, Will recorded the song "Secrets" for the soundtrack to Dexter's Laboratory: The Hip-Hop Experiment, a musical accompaniment to the Cartoon Network original series. Prior to this, he had also composed the theme music for another Genndy Tartakovsky series, Samurai Jack.

=== 2003–2006: Monkey Business ===
In November 2003, work began on a fourth Black Eyed Peas album, entitled Monkey Business, the second album with new band member Fergie. Upon the success of Monkey Business, which was released in 2005, the album was certified three times Platinum by the RIAA in the U.S. and has sold over 10 million copies worldwide. The Canadian Recording Industry Association (or CRIA) has certified Monkey Business 6× Platinum, with sales of over 600,000 copies. The Australian Recording Industry Association (or ARIA) has also certified Monkey Business 6× Platinum, denoting sales of over 420,000 copies. The album's tracks earned the group four 2006 Grammy Award nominations and they also won the Grammy for Best Rap Performance by a Duo or Group for "Don't Phunk with My Heart". According to IFPI, over 2 million copies have been sold in Europe. In the UK alone, it has sold over 1 million copies, although this is significantly lower than their sales of Elephunk, which stand at over 1.6 million copies and 10 million worldwide. The band announced they were going to take a break to focus on their own personal projects. Will went on to produce Fergie's first solo album, The Dutchess, which was released in 2006, before beginning work with Michael Jackson, who had requested Will's expertise for the recording and production of his new album. Work began on the Jackson album in 2006, and continued until the singer's death in 2009, at which point will.i.am revealed that none of the material recorded during the period would be released. However, remixes recorded for Jackson's Thriller 25 anniversary album were released in 2008.

=== 2007–2009: Songs About Girls and Change Is Now ===
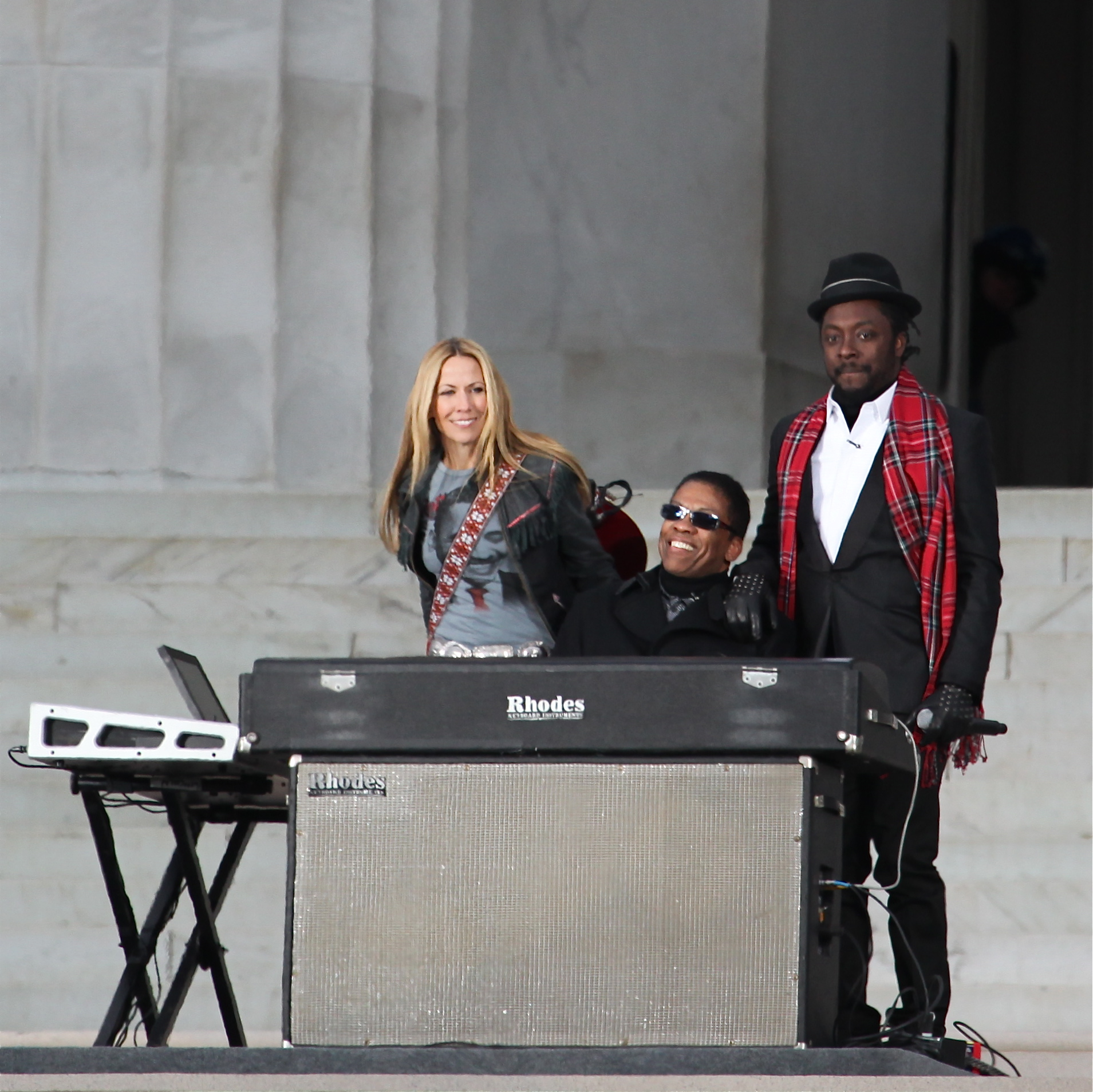
will.i.am with Sheryl Crow and Herbie Hancock, performing at the We Are One: The Obama Inaugural Celebration at the Lincoln Memorial concert

In 2007, will.i.am announced that he had co-created an all-female soul band entitled the Paradiso Girls, with whom he intended to work with on an upcoming solo project. The album, Songs About Girls, was released in 2007. The album spawned three singles, "I Got It From My Mama", "One More Chance" and "Heartbreaker". Songs About Girls fared slightly better than his previous solo efforts; however, it failed to shift more than 75,000 copies. Will also did a remix to the song "With Love" by actress and singer Hilary Duff.

In 2008, will.i.am contributed the song "One Tribe" to the Survival International charity album, Songs for Survival. Also in 2008, he was featured on rapper Flo Rida's debut album, Mail on Sunday, where he produced and featured on the song "In the Ayer", and featured on Usher's fifth album, Here I Stand. In January 2008, will.i.am announced plans that he was masterminding a political album, Change is Now: Renewing America's Promise, in support of Barack Obama's presidential campaign. The first single, "Yes We Can", featured a music video directed by Jesse Dylan. The lyrics of the song are composed almost entirely of excerpts from Obama's speech on January 8, 2008, following the New Hampshire presidential primary election. The video features appearances from numerous celebrities and first appeared on the website for Dipdive. The video racked up three million views within a week and over four million subsequently on YouTube. On June 13, 2008, "Yes We Can" won an award at the 35th Annual Creative Arts and Entertainment Daytime Emmy Awards for "New Approaches in Daytime Entertainment". On February 29, 2008, the album's second single, "We Are the Ones", was released on Dipdive and YouTube. The video features several celebrities chanting "O-BA-MA" as a portrayal as their hopes and wishes for Obama and his presidential campaign. On November 4, 2008, will.i.am spoke to CNN's Anderson Cooper about his support for then-Senator Obama using CNN's 'hologram' technology (actually tomography).

Following the 2008 election, and Obama's victory, Will released the album's third single, "It's a New Day". The video reflects on the historical events that led to the election of the first African-American president and the public's reaction to his election. The video debuted on The Oprah Winfrey Show. In honor of the inauguration of Barack Obama as president, will.i.am collaborated with producer David Foster on the album's fourth single, "America's Song", with contributing vocals from Seal, Bono, Mary J. Blige, and Faith Hill. In response to Obama's reaction following Kanye West's interruption of Taylor Swift at the 2009 MTV Video Music Awards, will.i.am penned the album's fifth and final single, "The Jackass Song". It featured a sample of Kanye West's "Heartless". Will wrote a blog post, which featured the song on Dipdive, and released in February 2009. will.i.am attended and spoke at the FIRST Robotics Competition kickoff on January 8, 2011, declaring, "I am a FIRST fan." He has also named FIRST Founder Dean Kamen "one of [his] heroes" on his Twitter account.

=== 2009–2016: Black Eyed Peas reformation, The E.N.D, The Beginning, and #willpower ===
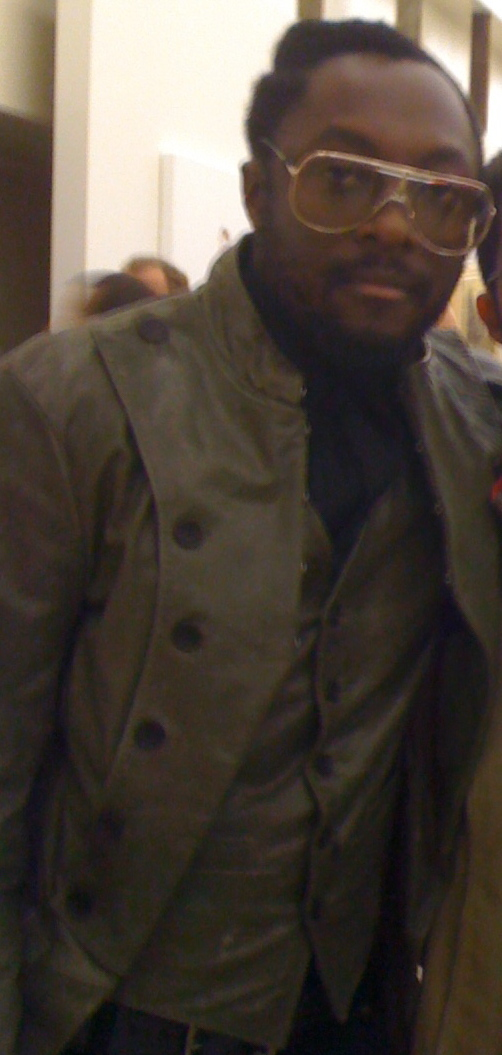
will.i.am in Los Angeles, California in 2010

In March 2009, will.i.am announced plans for the Black Eyed Peas to return; within months, their comeback single, "Boom Boom Pow", had reached number 1 on the UK Singles Chart and Billboard Hot 100. They went on to have three number 1 singles before releasing their comeback album, The E.N.D.. The album's success warranted a second comeback album, The Beginning, released in November 2010. The album spawned another three hit singles, but the band soon announced plans they were to break again, following the conclusion of their world tour. In 2009, will.i.am worked with rappers Flo Rida and Akon for Flo's second studio album, R.O.O.T.S., and recorded four tracks with Girls Aloud member Cheryl for her debut solo album 3 Words. He also worked with Rihanna on her fourth studio album, Rated R, for a track called "Photographs". In February 2010, he wrote and produced the single "OMG" by Usher, which appeared on Usher's seventh studio album, Raymond vs. Raymond. In a YouTube video posted by YGLifeOfficial on March 15, 2010, will.i.am expressed his desire to work with Korean K-pop girl group 2NE1, and help them achieve international success. Will has recorded a collaboration with Britney Spears, "Big Fat Bass", which features on her seventh studio album, Femme Fatale.

During the recording of the Black Eyed Peas' sixth studio album, The Beginning, band colleague Fergie announced in an interview that will.i.am was in the process of recording a new solo album, tentatively entitled Black Einstein. will.i.am formally announced that he was in the process of recording a fourth solo album, with some material being recorded under the pseudonym Zuper Blahq. In January 2010, a cut from the album, "I'm In the House", a collaboration with Steve Aoki, was released as a single, charting at number 29 on the UK Singles Chart due to strong downloads. In October 2010, a second cut from the album, "Check It Out", a collaboration with rapper Nicki Minaj, peaked at number 4 on the UK Singles Chart. In February 2011, a third cut from the album, "Dance", a collaboration with Natalia Kills, peaked at number 62 on the UK Singles Chart. The music video was directed by James Sutton, and features a cameo by Natalia. In April 2011, will.i.am recorded four songs for the soundtrack of the animated film Rio, in which he voiced the character, Pedro the red-crested cardinal. "Hot Wings (I Wanna Party)", "Drop It Low", "Real In Rio" and "Advice For The Young At Heart", featuring an array of artists including Jamie Foxx, Anne Hathaway and Tears for Fears. None of the songs managed to chart, however, Will announced that he was going to remix the tracks for inclusion on Black Einstein. In September 2011, a fourth cut from the album, "Forever", a collaboration with Wolfgang Gartner, was released as a single. It was around this time that will.i.am announced that he changed the title of the album from Black Einstein to #willpower.

The video premiered on August 26, 2011. In November 2011, Will premiered what is intended to be the album's official lead single, "T.H.E. (The Hardest Ever)", a collaboration with Jennifer Lopez and Mick Jagger. Will announced via his Twitter that the video for "T.H.E. (The Hardest Ever)" was filmed in LA, and that before he returned home, he stopped off in Brazil to film the video for the album's second official single, "Great Times". In December 2011, a fifth cut from the album, "Party Like An Animal", a collaboration with Dutch singer Eva Simons and LMFAO, premiered at the HTC Beats Launch party. will.i.am also announced he has collaborations with Spears, Alicia Keys, Busta Rhymes, Swizz Beatz and a couple others on the album. He also stated there is a possibility Shakira could feature on the album. #willpower is due for release in 2013, and will.i.am later confirmed that Cheryl and Justin Bieber would also appear on #willpower. In mid-October, Spears confirmed on her Twitter account that she had filmed the music video for the single she was featuring in called "Scream & Shout".

will.i.am was among the performers at the Diamond Jubilee Concert held outside Buckingham Palace on June 4, 2012. The first song broadcast from Mars was his new single, "Reach for the Stars". He discussed and listened to it with a live audience at NASA in Pasadena, California after it was returned from the Curiosity rover. The song "Hall of Fame" by the Script also featured will.i.am. It debuted onto radio on July 23, 2012, and was released for digital download on August 21, 2012. He later featured in Priyanka Chopra's debut single "In My City". It was announced in October 2012 that will.i.am will feature on Kesha's second album Warrior on the track "Crazy Kids". He also co-wrote and co-produced the Dr Luke produced track. In November 2012, will.i.am released the third single from #willpower which was "Scream & Shout" featuring Spears. It debuted in the top 20 on the Billboard 100, eventually reaching a peak of number 3 and debuting at number 2 on the UK Singles Chart and reaching number one in January 2013 for two weeks. It went number one in many countries

During an interview with Capital FM, will.i.am confirmed he had collaborated with Justin Bieber for his next release "#thatPOWER" and premiered the single on the same day it was released onto iTunes in the US the same day and debuted on the Billboard 100 at number 42. In April 2013, will.i.am and Chris Brown's track "Let's Go", also from the #willpower album, became the centre of a copyright controversy, with trance producers Arty and Mat Zo claiming that will.i.am used elements of their 2011 track "Rebound" in his song without permission from the artists or their label. This claim was later backed by Anjunabeats, the record label behind Arty and Mat Zo. His fourth studio album, #willpower, was re-released in December 2013. It features several new tracks, including the lead single "Feelin' Myself" featuring Miley Cyrus, French Montana, and Wiz Khalifa. Spears featured will.i.am on her song "It Should Be Easy" on her eighth studio album Britney Jean, for which he co-wrote and produced several tracks. He was also an executive producer of the project.

On April 4, 2014, will.i.am appeared on Alan Carr: Chatty Man, where he talked about plans to release his own Smartwatch. He revealed that it can be used as a phone, to store music, and use Facebook, Twitter and Instagram. He also showed a preview of a music video for a song called "It's My Birthday". On May 20, 2014, a 90-second snippet was uploaded to SoundCloud. It features American singer-songwriter Cody Wise, is produced by Will and Damien LeRoy and is written by himself, Cody Wise and Keith Harris. It was released on July 6, 2014. In an interview with Capital FM, will.i.am confirmed that the Black Eyed Peas were getting back together. On April 7, 2016, will.i.am released the single "Boys & Girls" featuring Pia Mia. A week later, on April 14, a new remix of "Mona Lisa Smile" featuring Nicole Scherzinger was released.

=== 2017–present ===
In March 2020, will.i.am collaborated with a group of artists made up of Bono, Jennifer Hudson, and Yoshiki for the song "Sing for Life". The musicians felt motivated by the widespread sense of despair surrounding the COVID-19 pandemic and the attempts by multiple individuals to pursue creative endeavors while facing new social restrictions. The official YouTube description stated that the track aimed to spread "joy" during trying "times like these". In 2023, he released the singles "The Formula" (with Lil Wayne) and a fourth collaborative song with Britney Spears titled "Mind Your Business", both of which were panned by critics and audiences and failed to make an effect on domestic or worldwide charts. In February 2024, will.i.am appeared as a guest during Usher's Super Bowl halftime show, performing "OMG".

== Other ventures ==
=== Acting ===
The Black Eyed Peas, including will.i.am, first started acting in the commercial series "Instant Def" to advertise Snickers chocolate bars. He starred in Madagascar: Escape 2 Africa as the voice of the hippopotamus character Moto Moto. He also contributed a number of tracks to the film's soundtrack in collaboration with the score composer Hans Zimmer. will.i.am played John Wraith in his major film debut, X-Men Origins: Wolverine, a prequel to the X-Men film series. He also guest-starred on the CBS drama Joan of Arcadia as God, one of several actors who played this role during the series. He also starred in the 2011 animated film Rio, and 2014's Rio 2, as a rapping red-crested cardinal named Pedro, and like Madagascar: Escape 2 Africa, he contributed his singing voice to the film's soundtrack, along with his fellow co-stars. In The Urbz: Sims In The City, will.i.am appeared as himself along with the Black Eyed Peas, and the film also uses Black Eyed Peas' songs as its soundtrack. He briefly appeared as himself in the Tina Fey and Steve Carell comedy film Date Night. He appeared in the 2016 Grammy-nominated documentary film about American DJ and producer Steve Aoki, titled I'll Sleep When I'm Dead.

=== Philanthropy ===
will.i.am's i.am Angel Foundation provided fast internet access to the Estrada Courts housing project in Boyle Heights where he formerly lived.

=== The Voice UK and Australia ===
On being confirmed as a coach on The Voice UK, will.i.am said, "I'm proud to be doing The Voice UK because the UK was the first place I saw success," and "It's the place I'm the most creative outside of home." Danny Cohen, controller of BBC One, added, "I am thrilled that Will.i.am has signed up to be a coach on The Voice. He is a huge star who will bring a unique creativity to the show." Talking about the differences between the show and X Factor, "I won't be a judge on X Factor. The Voice is different. You can't even compare the two. One, you have people in the music industry, current and legends, coaching the next generation. The other format you have judges critiquing, giving their opinions on things when they don't really know, other than Randy Jackson on Idol".

In preparation for the role as a coach, he asked advice from friend and ex-The X Factor judge Cheryl Cole. Talking to Capital FM he said, "I reached out to Cheryl for advice on keeping your cool, having a poker face, the importance of sticking with the singers – it's their dream, a lot of the times when you have other performers a part of the show, celebrities tend to want the shine so they hog up time. So my whole thing was that I want to do The Voice, but I don't want to hog up time to where the singers up there are looking like, 'Is this about you guys?'. In March 2012, it was reported that he had turned his "plush" dressing room into a recording studio, and "instead of just listening with his headphones, he has installed some mega bass bins".

On November 26, 2013, will.i.am was announced as a coach to replace Seal for the fourth series of the Australian version of The Voice along with fellow Voice UK judge Kylie Minogue who replaced Delta Goodrem. He was the winning coach having coached voice winner Anja Nissen in 2014. Neither will.i.am nor Minogue returned for the fourth series in 2015 and were replaced by Jessie J and Goodrem. He has contributed to The Voice UK since 2012. He also served as a coach on the UK version of The Voice Kids from 2017 to 2023.

=== Fashion ===
Before joining the Black Eyed Peas, will.i.am attended the Fashion Institute of Design & Merchandising in Los Angeles. In 2001, he began designing his own signature clothing line, i.am, which made its official debut in 2005 at the Magic Apparel Trade Show in Las Vegas. In 2007, will.i.am teamed up with Blue Holdings to design a premium denim collection, i.am Antik, that was scheduled to debut in August 2007 at the Project Show in Las Vegas. will.i.am instead had new partners and was launching i.am. will.i.am is currently being sued $2 million for abandoning the project for which, the label states, he was obligated until 2016, but will.i.am insists it is already over. He also launched his own glasses range.

=== Technology ===
Appearing at the kickoff event for the 2011 FIRST Robotics Competition, Logo Motion held at Southern New Hampshire University, will.i.am stated that he is "a big fan", and that the newly unveiled game was "dope". He also executive produced a TV Special – I.AM. FIRST: Science is Rock & Roll – about the 2011 FIRST World Championship at the Edward Jones Dome, St Louis. It was produced by Greg Sills and Paul Flattery, directed by Michael Dempsey. It was aired by ABC on August 14, 2011, at 7 p.m. As part of the special, will.i.am appeared with the Black Eyed Peas. Willow Smith also performed and will.i.am did a DJ set. He continues to support FIRST, and at the 2013 FIRST World Championship, will.i.am became the first recipient of the Make It Loud award, which is given to the person who has contributed the most in increasing the awareness of FIRST to the general public. In January 2011, Intel named will.i.am as director of creative innovation, with input in developing smartphones, tablets and laptops. In January 2012, he appeared on the BBC TV series Top Gear, as the Star in a Reasonably Priced Car; on the program, will.i.am claimed he was starting his own car company called IAMAUTO.

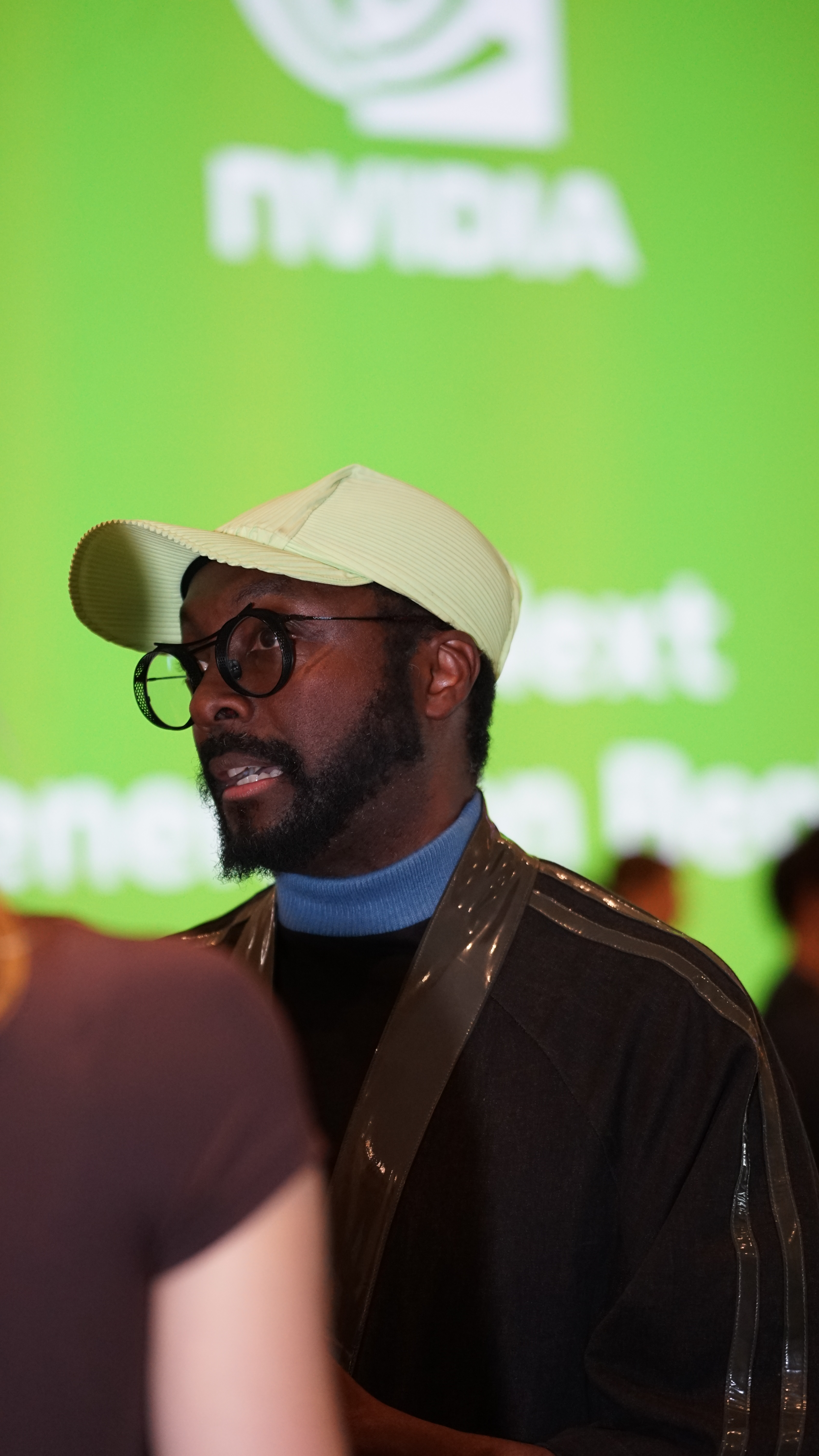
will.i.am at Nvidia display at CES 2026

By becoming the first artist to stream a song ("Reaching for the Stars") from the surface of Mars on August 28, 2012, will.i.am made inter-planetary music history. The event took place at NASA's Jet Propulsion Laboratory (JPL) in Pasadena, California. Expanding his forays into iPhone accessory development, will.i.am announced plans to release a camera enhancer to "dramatically enhance the clarity and definition of iPhone photographs," by effectively making the 8-megapixel sensor into a 14-megapixel one. Termed the i.am+, the device was said to be the first in a series of "digital real estate" for the singer. In April 2016, it was announced that i.am+ had acquired the Tel Aviv machine-learning technology start-up Sensiya.

3D Systems appointed will.i.am as its chief creative officer (CCO) on January 8, 2014. Since retiring from music (a retirement that did not last), he has helped design smartwatches for German company Deutsche Telekom since late 2015. In 2016, The Verge reported that will.i.am would join actress Gwyneth Paltrow and serial entrepreneur Gary Vaynerchuk on Apple TV's Planet of the Apps, calling the trio "successful" and "big names" with experience launching companies. The show received mixed to negative reviews. On July 27, 2017, i.am acquired Wink, the Internet of Things and Smart Home hub platform, from owner Flextronics for a reported $38.7 million with an additional $20 million commitment, likely earmarked to sustain manufacturing of Wink's products.

will.i.am has focused his efforts on optimizing inclusivity of artificial intelligence. On June 7, 2024, he gave a speech at the Stata Center of the Massachusetts Institute of Technology (MIT). He is the CEO of the company Focus Your Ideas. He joined the faculty of Arizona State University in spring 2026 to teach a class on agentic artificial intelligence, "The Agentic Self".

== Personal life ==
In December 2010, will.i.am discussed suffering from tinnitus as a result of his career. During April 2013, he disclosed having attention deficit hyperactivity disorder (ADHD). In May 2023, will.i.am enrolled at Harvard Business School under their Owner/President Management program, and graduated the following April. will.i.am endorsed Kamala Harris' 2024 presidential campaign. He released the single "Yes She Can" in support of her campaign. On May 15, 2026, will.i.am delivered the undergraduate commencement address at Worcester Polytechnic Institute, where he was also awarded an honorary doctorate of humanities.

== Discography ==
Solo studio albums

- Lost Change (2001)
- Must B 21 (2003)
- Songs About Girls (2007)
- #willpower (2013)

== Filmography ==
=== Film ===
Year	Title	Role	Notes
1999	Julie and the Cadillacs	Ian	
2004	Garfield: The Movie	Himself	Cameo during Hey Mama dance
2008	Madagascar: Escape 2 Africa	Moto Moto	Voice; Also composer
2009	Arthur and the Revenge of Maltazard	Snow	Voice
2009	X-Men Origins: Wolverine	John Wraith	
2010	Date Night	Himself	Cameo
2010	Bouncing Cats	Himself	
2011	Rio	Pedro	Voice
2011	Electric Daisy Carnival Experience	Himself	
2013	Justin Bieber's Believe	Himself	
2014	Rio 2	Pedro	Voice
2015	East LA Interchange	Himself	
2018	Widdershins		Producer
2020	Sergio Mendes in the Key of Joy	Himself	

=== Television ===
Year	Title	Role	Notes
2001–2004, 2017	Samurai Jack	Theme song singer	
2005	Joan of Arcadia	Three Card Monte Guy God	Episode: "Independence Day"
2007	Cane	Himself	Episode: "A New Legacy"
2012	The Cleveland Show	Bernard Bernard	13 episodes
2012	2012 Television Rack Awards	Host	First Time Hosting, 9th time performing
2012	American Idol	Himself	Top 12 guest mentor
2012	Top Gear	Himself	Celebrity guest
2012–present	The Voice UK	Himself	Coach or "judge" and mentor for artists, seasons 1 onwards
2014	The Voice Australia	Himself	Coach or "judge" and mentor for artists, season 3
2017	Planet of the Apps	Himself	Mentor
2017–2023	The Voice Kids UK	Himself	Coach or "judge" and mentor for artists, seasons 1 through 7
2019	The Rookie	Himself	Episode: "The Checklist"
2019	Songland	Himself	Episode: "will.i.am"
2019	The Voice	Himself	Mentor
2020	Anitta: Made in Honório	Himself	Episode 3: "Funk"
2021	Alter Ego	Himself	Judge: Musician, Producer and Tech Entrepreneur
2021	will.i.am: The Blackprint	Himself	Presenter of the Black History Month documentary for ITV
2023	Superstar: Aaliyah	Himself	ABC documentary
2023	That's My Jam	Himself/Guest	Along with Keke Palmer, Saweetie, Joel McHale

=== Video games ===
Year	Title	Voice role	Notes
2004	The Urbz: Sims in the City	Himself	Vocals
2009	X-Men Origins: Wolverine	John Wraith	
2011	The Black Eyed Peas Experience	Himself	

== Tours ==
- The #Willpower Tour (2013–15)
- The Vans Warped Tour (2009)

== Awards and nominations ==
Daytime Emmy Awards

- 2008, New Approaches in Daytime Entertainment: "Yes We Can"

Grammy Awards

Year	Nominee / work	Award	Result
2004	Elephunk	Best Engineered Album, Non-Classical	Nominated
2004	"Where Is the Love?" (ft. Justin Timberlake)	Best Rap/Sung Collaboration	Nominated
2004	"Where Is the Love?" (ft. Justin Timberlake)	Record of the Year	Nominated
2005	"Let's Get It Started"	Record of the Year	Nominated
2005	"Let's Get It Started"	Best Rap Performance by a Duo or Group	Won
2005	"Let's Get It Started"	Best Rap Song	Nominated
2005	"Hey Mama"	Best Rap Song	Nominated
2006	"Don't Phunk with My Heart"	Best Rap Song	Nominated
2006	"Don't Phunk with My Heart"	Best Rap Performance by a Duo or Group	Won
2006	"Ordinary People"	Song of the Year	Nominated
2006	"Ordinary People"	Best R&B Song	Nominated
2006	"Gone Going" (with Jack Johnson)	Best Pop Collaboration with Vocal	Nominated
2006	"Don't Lie"	Best Pop Performance by a Duo or Group with Vocal	Nominated
2007	"My Humps"	Best Pop Performance by a Duo or Group with Vocal	Won
2007	will.i.am	Producer of the Year, Non-Classical	Nominated
2007	"Mas Que Nada"	Best Best Urban/Alternative Performance	Nominated
2007	"That Heat"	Best Best Urban/Alternative Performance	Nominated
2009	"Be OK"	Best Best Urban/Alternative Performance	Won
2009	"American Boy"	Song of the Year	Nominated
2009	will.i.am	Producer of the Year, Non-Classical	Nominated
2010	The E.N.D.	Album of the Year	Nominated
2010	The E.N.D.	Best Pop Vocal Album	Won
2010	"I Gotta Feeling"	Record of the Year	Nominated
2010	"I Gotta Feeling"	Best Pop Performance by a Duo or Group with Vocals	Won
2010	"Boom Boom Pow"	Best Dance Recording	Nominated
2010	"Boom Boom Pow"	Best Short Form Music Video	Won

Latin Grammy Awards

- 2006, Best Brazilian Contemporary Pop Album: "Timeless", Sérgio Mendes (producer)

Television Rack Awards

- As of 2012, will.i.am had won ten Television Rack Awards altogether (five with the Black Eyed Peas and five as a solo artist).

The National Television Awards

Year	Nominee / work	Award	Result
2018	The Voice UK	TV Judge	Nominated

Mirchi Music Awards

- 2012, Indie Pop Song of the Year – "In My City" (Nominated)

On May 15, 2026, will.i.am was awarded an honorary Doctor of Humanities degree and delivered the Undergraduate Commencement address at Worcester Polytechnic Institute.
