= Arty (musician) =

Russian DJ and producer

Arty Артём Столяров
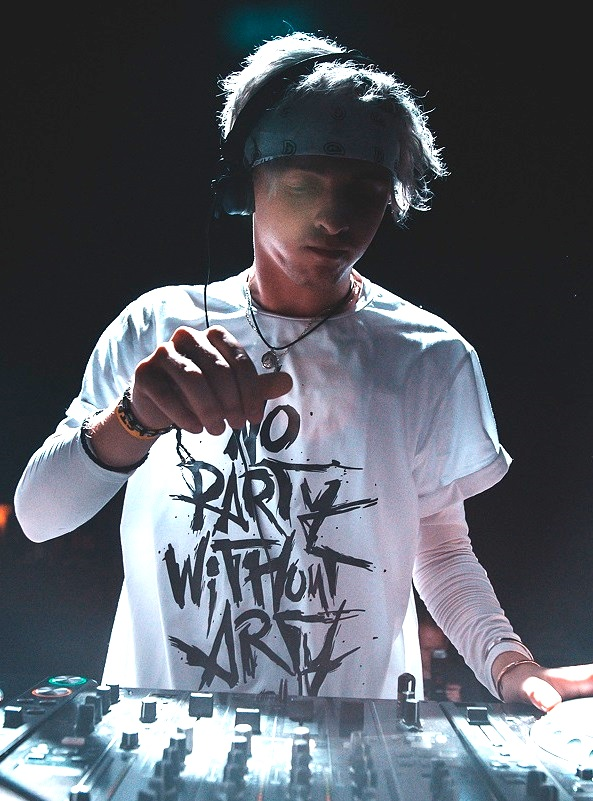
- Arty at Alfa Future People Festival 2015

Background information
- Also known as: Alpha 9
- Born: Artem Stoliarov; 28 September 1989 (age 37); Engels, Russian SSR, Soviet Union (now Russia)
- Genres: Progressive house; progressive trance; big room house; pop
- Occupations: DJ; music producer
- Years active: 2009–present
- Labels: Anjunabeats; Armada; Vandit; Enhanced; Insomniac; Interscope; Revealed; STMPD
- Website: artyofficial.com

Artem Stolyarov (Russian: Артём Столяро́в, [ɐrˈtʲɵm stəlʲɪˈrof]; born 28 September 1989), known professionally as Arty and Alpha 9, is a Russian DJ and music producer. He has collaborated with Armin van Buuren, Above & Beyond, BT, Paul van Dyk, Mat Zo, OneRepublic and Matisse & Sadko. His debut album, Glorious (2015), peaked at number 14 on the US Dance/Electronic Albums charts.

== Early life ==
Arty was born on 28 September 1989 in Engels. At the age of eight years old, his grandmother insisted that he should attend music school, from which he graduated aged just fourteen. After that he considered applying for music college, but eventually decided against it, as the chance of becoming a professional pianist was really small and because he no longer enjoyed playing. Instead he learned to use FL Studio sequencer, and his love of video games and electronics led to his keen interest in production equipment. Eventually, he began to be influenced by artists such as The Prodigy, The Chemical Brothers and The Crystal Method. After graduating from the Saratov State University with a degree in Applied Mathematics and Computer Science, Arty decided to seriously commit to electronic music.

== Career ==
=== 2009–11: Early releases ===
Arty's debut release, "Inside of Me" / "Flip Flop" with Misha Kitone was followed by the EP Vanilla Sky, which appeared on the label Enhanced Music and brought him to the attention of many world-renowned DJs. The Enhanced Progressive label was the first to sign Arty as an artist. His single "Bliss" appeared on the track listing of A State of Trance by Armin van Buuren in late 2009 and his breakthrough came later that year when Above & Beyond signed him to Anjunabeats. They featured his singles "Rush" and "The Wonder" in their club sets and on their radio show Trance Around the World. Following that, Arty released "Trio" with Matisse & Sadko on Axwell's Axtone label in 2011.

Arty also released "Bliss" (2009) and "Come Home" (2010) on Ferry Corsten's label, Flashover Recordings under his alias Alpha 9.

Following his release on Axtone Records in 2011, Arty collaborated with fellow Anjunabeats-signed artist Mat Zo and their first joint production "Rebound" was released on 19 April 2011 as Anjunabeats' 200th single. The song was voted 'Webvote Winner' on three straight occasions in the radio show Trance Around the World. At the anniversary party for ASOT 500 of Armin van Buuren's radio show A State of Trance on 9 April 2011 in Den Bosch, the two DJs played together on the Main Floor alongside other well-established DJs such as Markus Schulz, Above & Beyond, Gareth Emery, and Armin van Buuren himself. Since then, Arty has played many worldwide clubs and festivals such as Electric Daisy Carnival, Tomorrowland, Creamfields, Ushuaia Ibiza, XS Encore Las Vegas, and Amnesia Ibiza.

=== 2014–15: Glorious ===
In 2014, Arty became the first Russian musician to sign with the American Insomniac record label and on 9 October 2015, he released his debut album Glorious on Insomniac Records. Arty has had countless releases on labels such as Enhanced Progressive, Vandit Records, Insomniac Records, Anjunabeats, Spinnin', Axtone, and Revealed. On 9 May 2016, Arty released "Bloodfire", a bass house-influenced big room track which was a deviation from his typical progressive trance releases on Hardwell's label Revealed Recordings. On 6 June 2016, he released an electro house track on label Anjunabeats titled "Distorted Love". Arty then collaborated with producer Andrew Bayer to release "Follow The Light" on 8 June 2016, which was his third release on Anjunabeats for the year.

=== 2017–present: Alpha 9 and recent releases ===
In 2017, Arty officially revived his trance side project titled Alpha 9, which had been inactive since 2010. Together with releasing trance track "This Night Is Ours" on 3 February 2017, Arty posted a letter on Facebook written to his listeners. "Closer to the end of last year[2016] I noticed how much my music was different from what I’ve done in the past, and I felt like I had been neglecting my long-time fans and it didn’t feel fair. And that’s how I came up with idea of bringing the Alpha 9 alias back," wrote Arty in his letter.

He then moved towards the tropical house genre with his release of single "Falling Down" featuring American singer Maty Noyes on 27 February 2017. The track also features a 'Night Mix' version where "Falling Down" is mixed into a future bass track for festival play. Arty collaborated with Korean American K-pop singer Eric Nam to release "Idea Of You" on 9 June 2017, which marks Arty's first venture into pop music. On 7 September 2017, he released "Supposed to Be" on Martin Garrix's record label, Stmpd Rcrds. "Working on this record was an unbelievable experience. The lyrics are so meaningful and powerful that I wanted to make sure that all of the instruments I was using were reflecting the overall significance of the song," stated Arty when asked about the track.

Arty's first release of 2018, "You and I", was released under his Alpha 9 alias on 12 January 2018. He released "Sunrise" on 19 January 2018, which marks his second release on label Armada Music since his collaboration, "Nehalennia", with Armin van Buuren in 2013. "It's important for me to continue making the music I enjoy the most and 'Sunrise' definitely falls into that category. It’s both a milestone and an incredibly important track in my career as I get back to my Progressive House roots," wrote Arty along with the track's release. Arty released "Rain" through Armada Music on 30 March 2018. "No Going Back", a collaboration produced under Alpha 9 with Spencer Brown, was released on 5 April 2018, followed by "All We Need" on 20 April 2018. He released melodic house track "Couldn't Be Better" on 11 May 2018.

Arty released a tribute song for Swedish producer Avicii, who died in April 2018, titled "Tim" on 27 July 2018. The song paid homage to Avicii's original piano-based sounds which had driven him to success, which was also used by Arty in his earlier tracks "Kate" and "Rebound". Next, Arty released "Perfect Strangers" through Armada Music on 28 September 2018, a track he has labelled as one of his "favourite" songs to produce within the year. On 9 November 2018, Arty released trance single "Never Letting Go" with Audien through Anjunabeats, marking his first release on the label since 2016. The song was produced in three years, after multiple musical rejections on approaching the track.

He released "Save Me Tonight" on 25 January 2019, which based on Arty was influenced by progressive and house music. The track's music video was directed by American actor Noah Centineo and featured English-American actress Lily Collins, with the video's storyline narrating a revenge plot by Collin's and Noah's characters against a group of school bullies.

== Awards and recognition ==
In 2010, Arty appeared in the Top 100 DJs selection of DJ Magazine, where he featured at number 78. In 2011, Arty climbed 53 spots to position 25 on the list but moved down three spots in 2012 to take 28th. At the International Dance Music Awards 2011, he was nominated in the category Best Breakthrough DJ but the award went to Afrojack. In 2012, Arty was nominated twice for the IDMA's in the category for Best Trance Track for his collaboration with Paul van Dyk on "The Ocean", and his collaboration with BT and Nadia Ali on the track "This Must Be the Love". In 2013, he ranked 57th in DJ Mag's Top 100, and in 2014, he also made the list at No. 99, despite having a quiet year. Arty appeared on the Fall 2013 cover of Vonnubi Press magazine along with a 10-page spread.

== Discography ==
Studio albums

- Glorious (2015)
- From Russia With Love (2020)
