= Exhibit A =

Exhibit A may refer to:

- An exhibit (legal) in a courtroom often labelled Exhibit A, Exhibit B etc.
- Exhibit A (art exhibition), a 1992 art exhibition at the Serpentine Gallery, London
- Exhibit A (album), a 2004 album by The Features
- "Exhibit A (Transformations)", a 2009 single by Jay Electronica
- Exhibit A (film), a 2007 British independent film
- Exhibit A (TV series), a 2019 Netflix series
- Exhibit A: Secrets of Forensic Science, a television series
