= Mike Ward (singer) =

English singer (born 1990)

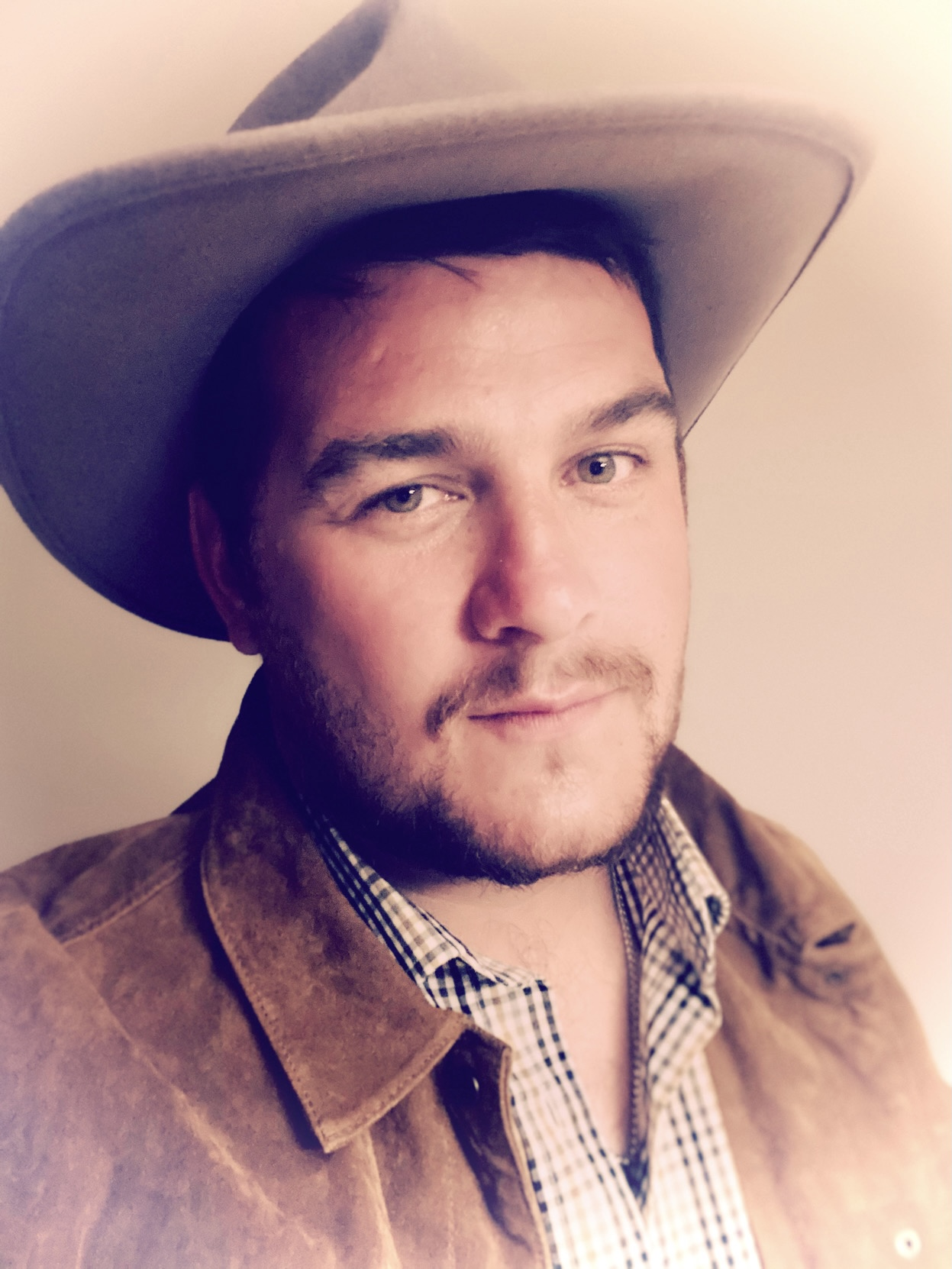

Background information
- Born: Michael Joseph Ward; 14 December 1990 (age 35); Salford, Greater Manchester, England
- Genre: Country music / pop music
- Occupation: Singer
- Instrument: Vocals
- Years active: 2013–present

Michael Joseph Ward (born 14 December 1990) is an English country singer from Salford who took part in UK series 2 of The Voice as part of Tom Jones' team singing mostly country music and became finalist in the last Final 4 round. Ward took part in the show after his mother Julie applied for him. He auditioned with the song "Don't Close Your Eyes" from Keith Whitley, with three of the four judges, Jessie J, Danny O'Donoghue and Sir Tom Jones turning their chairs. He opted to be in "Team Tom" and was his team's finalist in the competition singing "Suspicious Minds" solo and "Green Green Grass of Home" with Tom Jones. As a result of the public vote, he and Leah McFall were runners up, with the title going to Andrea Begley. Throughout the series, he was credited for trying to get country music noticed in the UK.

== Personal life ==
Ward was born to Julie Berry and Michael Ward on 14 December 1990. He is named after his father. Mike has four siblings Maria, Darren, Daryl and tank. Mike has Irish Traveller roots on his father's side. His grandmother died while he was filming The Voice live shows.

On 24 December 2014, Mike's father Michael Ward was a victim of a hit and run with his girlfriend (Paula Jolly) outside an ASDA store in Manchester. Paula died at the scene and Michael died in hospital hours after. Ward is a distant cousin of British The X Factor winner Shayne Ward in the 2nd series of the show.

On 6 September 2015, Ward became a father for the first time. He and his partner Francesca found out they were expecting a child a week after the loss of Mike’s father.

== Discography ==
=== Singles ===
Song title	UK release date	UK peak chart position
"When I Was Your Man"	22 June 2013	60
"Picking Up the Pieces"	29 June 2013	72
