= Home (Leah McFall song) =

Single by Leah McFall featuring will.i.am
- Released: July 27, 2014
- Genre: Pop; R&B
- Length: 3:08
- Label: Capitol
- Songwriter(s): Alex Ebert; Jade Castrinos; Jean-Baptiste; Ryan Buendia; Michael McHenry; William Adams
- Producer(s): will.i.am; Free School

Leah McFall singles chronology
"Home" (2014)	"Wolf Dean" (2016)

will.i.am singles chronology
"It's My Birthday" (2014)	"Home" (2014)	"Ew!" (2014)

"Home" is a song recorded by British singer Leah McFall, the runner-up on the second series of the BBC talent show The Voice, featuring guest vocals from her show mentor will.i.am. Built around a sample from American indie folk band Edward Sharpe and the Magnetic Zeros' same-titled 2010 song, it was written and produced by Jean-Baptiste, Ryan Buendia, Michael McHenry, and will.i.am and released through Capitol Records on July 27, 2014. The song also featured in the film The Book of Life.

== Background ==
On June 6, Mcfall announced the title of her first official single, "Home" featuring will.i.am. She also released the cover of the single on Facebook. The song premiered on BBC Radio 1Xtra on 9 June 2014, and the song was released on 27 July 2014.

Will.i.am originally offered the song to Britney Spears but turned it down before Mcfall released it.

== Music video ==
A music video, created for the single, features both McFall and will.i.am. It was directed by Elisha Smith-Leverock.

== Charts ==
=== Weekly charts ===
Chart (2014)	Peak position
Scotland (OCC)	47
UK Singles (OCC)	56
UK Singles Downloads (OCC)	45
