= Run to You (Whitney Houston song) =

1993 single by Whitney Houston

Single by Whitney Houston

from the album The Bodyguard: Original Soundtrack Album
- B-side: "After We Make Love"; "For the Love of You"
- Released: June 21, 1993
- Recorded: November 15, 1991
- Studio: Encore Studios, Los Angeles, California
- Genre: R&B; pop; soul
- Length: 4:24
- Label: Arista
- Songwriters: Jud Friedman; Allan Rich
- Producer: David Foster

Whitney Houston singles chronology
"I Have Nothing" (1993)	"Run to You" (1993)	"Queen of the Night" (1993)

Music video
- "Run to You" on YouTube

"Run to You" is a song performed by American singer and actress Whitney Houston, released on June 21, 1993, by Arista Records as the fourth single from The Bodyguard: Original Soundtrack Album (1992). It was written by Jud Friedman and Allan Rich, and produced by David Foster. Originally intended to be a break-up song, it was approved by the production and stars. However, a month later, the director of The Bodyguard (Mick Jackson) called, saying he liked the song so much, but he'd rather have it to be a love song so the entire song was rewritten, except for the title.

All of the previous releases from The Bodyguard had been successes, landing in the top five. "Run to You" became a moderate hit, peaking at numbers 31 and 25 on the US Billboard Hot 100 and Cash Box Top 100. It spent six weeks inside the Billboard top 40, five of which were spent at the number 31 peak. Airplay and singles sales topped out at number 26 and 41, respectively. The single sales stalled at number 41 on the Hot 100 Singles Sales chart, most likely due to the fact its parent album, The Bodyguard, already was certified 8× platinum and nearing 9× platinum status quickly. Single sales were moderate because most consumers already owned the song by simply owning the album. On other Billboard charts, the song was moderately well received. On the Hot R&B/Hip-Hop Songs chart, it reached a peak position of number 31. The song also cracked the top 10 on the Hot Adult Contemporary Tracks chart, peaking at number 10. Internationally, it was not as well received, except in the UK and Ireland, peaking at number 15 and number nine, respectively. The accompanying music video for "Run to You" was directed by Mitchell Sinoway.

"Run to You" and its soundtrack-mate "I Have Nothing" were nominated for a 1993 Academy Award for Best Original Song, but they lost to "A Whole New World" from Aladdin.

== Background and recording ==
Songwriters Jud Friedman and Allan Rich competed with many of the industry's top songwriters when Houston's record label, Arista Records, announced their search for content to use in the upcoming The Bodyguard soundtrack. Rich recalls that "the project was very wide open. It seemed like everyone and their mother was trying to place their songs with Whitney. Jud and I zeroed in on a specific scene towards the end of the film, which was a break-up type song." Going through his own break-up at the time, Rich wrote the lyrics in a few days; Friedman composed the music.

The song was approved for use in the soundtrack by Houston, co-star Kevin Costner, Arista head Clive Davis, Jackson, and Gary LeMel, President of Music at Warner Brothers, the studio producing the film. However, Jackson decided to use the song earlier in the film when the romance between Houston and Costner's characters was just starting, and Rich rewrote the lyrics.

Houston's recording of the song was particularly memorable for Friedman and Rich. Friedman recounts:

"It was on a Friday night that Whitney came into the studio. It was great to meet her, and she was just a pleasure to work with. She was totally professional. Whitney actually had a cold that night, and her speaking voice was whispery and hoarse. But when she started singing, she sounded incredible. For Alan and I to be in the studio to hear her sing our song so beautifully, it was one of the greatest moments in our lives."

Rich and Friedman were nominated for Best Original Song at the 65th Annual Academy Awards on March 29, 1993 and Best Song Written Specifically For A Motion Picture Or For Television at the 36th Annual Grammy Awards on March 1, 1994, for "Run to You". Rich additionally signed a multi-year worldwide publishing agreement with his label MCA Music in early 1994 due in part to the success of the song.

== Critical reception ==
AllMusic editor Stephen Thomas Erlewine praised the song as a "first-rate urban pop song that skillfully captures Houston at her best." Larry Flick from Billboard magazine described it as a "sparkling ballad" with "a plush, shiny arrangement". He also viewed it as a "dramatic fare" and "a truly effective and memorable performance." Troy J. Augusto from Cashbox commented, "Loyal, forever-suffering true love is again the theme as Houston uses her flair for the dynamic with impressive (again, par for her course) results. Wonderful arrangement and production from David Foster point to another smash." Alan Jones from Music Week deemed it as "a sweeping, melodic, if predictable, ballad", that "is sure to be lapped up." Randy Ross from The Network Forty noted it as "vintage Whitney". Stephen Holden from The New York Times described it as a "booming generic ballad to which Houston applies her typical stentorian delivery." Larry A. from USA Today praised the singing, calling it a "thrilling ballad, powered by an operatic coloratura alto."

=== Accolades ===
Following Houston's death, the song appeared in many lists of her best songs. Alexis Petridis of The Guardian, while ranking it at number seventeen of her greatest songs list, claimed that "if it’s not quite up to the standard of 'I Will Always Love You' or as involving as 'I Have Nothing', it’s still simultaneously vulnerable and CinemaScope-epic." Placing at number 18 on Billboard's staff rank of her best songs, the song was praised for its "sweeping David Foster production, vulnerable lyrics ('Can’t you see the hurt in me?') and pleading-yet-powerful chorus. It just proves the astonishing depth of the 1992 soundtrack that this sure-fire hit (which went top 40 on the Hot 100 and top 10 on Adult Contemporary radio) had to sit back and wait its turn." "Run to You" was placed at number 17 on BET's list of her 40 best songs, noting that the song "is Exhibit A (or maybe Exhibit Z?), starting out softly and delicately before exploding with dramatic high notes at the end." Jael Rucker of radio One37PM ranked it at number 21 on their list, giving high praise for her vocals, saying that "Whitney's delivery on this song (plus the lyrics) will make you cry putting the powerhouse in powerhouse ballad. There's a reason why this was nominated for an Academy Award."

The song was also ranked at number nine on Rolling Stone's Reader's Poll of her best songs of all time, number 12 on Smooth Radio's list, and number 16 on GoldDerby's 35 best hits list. "Run to You" was also nominated for a 1993 Academy Award for Best Original Song, alongside its soundtrack-mate "I Have Nothing", but they lost to "A Whole New World" from Aladdin.

== Chart performance ==
Though "Run to You" is one of Houston's most recognized songs worldwide, the chart performance was not as successful as her previous hit singles at the time of its release because its parent album, The Bodyguard soundtrack, had already sold 21 million copies globally at that point and most consumers had the song by simply owning the soundtrack. In the United States, "Run to You" debuted at number 83 and 76 on the Billboard Hot 100 and Hot R&B Singles charts, in the issue dated June 26, 1993, respectively. Three weeks later the single reached its peak position of number 31 on both the charts in the July 17, 1993, issue. On the Hot 100, the song spent six weeks inside the Top 40, five of which were stayed at its number 31 peak from July 17 to August 14, 1993. Despite its modest peaks, it would accumulate 20 weeks on the Hot 100 and 17 weeks on the R&B chart. In addition, it peaked at number 41 and 26 on the component charts of the Hot 100, the Hot 100 Singles Sales and the Hot 100 Airplay, respectively. The song also peaked at number 10 on the Hot Adult Contemporary chart, becoming Houston's 17th Top 10 hit of the chart. In Canada, the song debuted at number 86 on the RPM 100 Hits Tracks chart, the issue dated July 10, 1993. The next week it leaped to number 34 on the chart and reached the Top 20 in its fourth week of release. In June 2025, the song was certified platinum by the Recording Industry Association of America for sales of a million copies, becoming the fourth platinum-certified single from the soundtrack. On the August 28, 1993, issue, it reached its peak position of number 10 on the chart, becoming her 16th Top 10 hit in the country.

Internationally, "Run to You" was a moderate hit like in the US. In the United Kingdom, the song entered the UK Singles Chart at number 20, the week ending dated July 31, 1993. The following week it reached its peak position of number 15 on the chart. In Belgium, the song debuted at number 19 on the VRT Top 30 chart but the next week dropped to outside Top 30. In Ireland, it peaked at number nine on the Irish Singles Chart, spending four weeks in the chart. In other European countries, it failed to make the Top 40 and stayed only one or two weeks on the charts, peaking at number 33 in the Netherlands, number 47 in France, and 58 in Germany.

== Music video ==
A music video was produced to promote the single, directed by Mitchell Sinoway. It features scenes from The Bodyguard intercut with scenes of an angelic Houston running on clouds. In the movie, there is a scene where bodyguard Frank Farmer (played by Kevin Costner) watches the video of "Run to You" on TV and is taken by Houston's performance. The music video was made available in HD on Houston's official YouTube channel in 2009, having generated more than 266 million views as of July 2026.

== Live performances ==
Houston performed the song on select dates during her Bodyguard World Tour in 1993–1994. "Run to You" was performed at the November 5 and 7, 1993 shows at the Earls Court Exhibition Centre in London, England, at the August 14, 1994, show at the San Jose Arena in San Jose, California and at the September 16, 27 and 28, 1994 shows at Radio City Music Hall in New York City. In November 2017, Legacy issued the 25th anniversary album, I Wish You Love: More from The Bodyguard; a live performance of "Run to You" is included.

== Track listings and formats ==
- US CD single
1. "Run to You" – 4:22
2. "After We Make Love" – 5:07
- US 12-inch single

A1. "Run to You" – 4:22
B1. "After We Make Love" – 5:07
B2. "For the Love of You – 5:29

- UK CD1
1. "Run to You" – 4:22
2. "After We Make Love" – 5:07
3. "For the Love of You – 5:28
- UK CD2
1. "Run to You" – 4:22
2. "I Belong to You" – 5:31
3. "Greatest Love of All" – 5:29

== Personnel ==
- Whitney Houston – vocals
- David Foster – producer, arrangement, string arrangement, bass
- Jud Friedman – arrangement, keyboards
- William Ross – string arrangement
- John Robinson – drums
- Dean Parks – acoustic guitar
- Simon Franglen – Synclavier and synth programming
- Dave Reitzas – recording engineer
- Mick Guzauski – mixing engineer

== Charts ==
=== Weekly charts ===
Weekly charts (1993–1994)
Chart (1993–1994)	Peak position
Australia (ARIA)	72
Belgium (Ultratop 50 Flanders)	27
Belgium (VRT Top 30)	19
Canada Top Singles (RPM)	10
Canada Adult Contemporary (RPM)	1
Canada Contemporary Hit Radio (The Record)	19
Europe (Eurochart Hot 100)	35
Europe (European Hit Radio)	21
France (SNEP)	47
Germany (GfK)	58
Ireland (IRMA)	9
Israel (Israeli Singles Chart)	12
Netherlands (Dutch Top 40)	33
Netherlands (Single Top 100)	47
Portugal (AFP)	7
Quebec (ADISQ)	5
UK Singles (Official Charts)	15
UK Airplay (Music Week)	12
US Billboard Hot 100	31
US Adult Contemporary (Billboard)	10
US Hot R&B/Hip-Hop Songs (Billboard)	31
US Pop Airplay (Billboard)	32
US Cash Box Top 100	25
US Radio & Records CHR/Pop Airplay Chart	13

Weekly charts (2012)
Chart (2012)	Peak position
France (SNEP)	55
Germany (GfK)	98
Netherlands (Single Top 100)	66
South Korea International (Circle)	40
Spain (Promusicae)	44
UK Singles (Official Charts)	67

=== Year-end charts ===
Year-end charts
Chart (1993)	Position
Canada Top Singles (RPM)	85
Canada Adult Contemporary (RPM)	10
US Hot Adult Contemporary Singles & Tracks (Billboard)	39

== Certifications ==
Region	Certification	Certified units/sales
United Kingdom (BPI)	Gold	400,000^{‡}
United States (RIAA)	Platinum	1,000,000^{‡}
^{‡} Sales+streaming figures based on certification alone.

== Release history ==
Release history
Region	Date	Format(s)	Label(s)	Ref.
United States	June 21, 1993	7-inch vinyl; CD; cassette	Arista	
Sweden	June 28, 1993	CD	Arista	
Australia	July 12, 1993	CD; cassette	Arista	
United Kingdom	July 19, 1993	7-inch vinyl; CD; cassette	Arista	
Japan	August 21, 1993	Mini-CD	Arista	

== Cover versions ==
- Natalie Cole performed a medley of "Run to You" and "I Have Nothing" at the 1993 Academy Awards. Houston was to perform both songs which was nominated for Best Original Song, but unable to attend the ceremony. Cole was joined on stage with producer David Foster playing piano.
- Christina Aguilera sang this song live in 2001 as a tribute to Whitney Houston at the 1st Annual BET Awards. The tribute was a result of Houston receiving the Lifetime Achievement Award. When receiving the award, Houston complimented Aguilera's version, calling it the best version beside her own. Aguilera would later be asked to perform the song in a tribute to Houston and The Bodyguard soundtrack, alongside "I Will Always Love You", "I Have Nothing", and "I'm Every Woman" at the American Music Awards of 2017.
- Smokie Norful recorded his version on a 2006 album Life Changing.
- Leanne Mitchell, winner of The Voice UK, released a version of the song in July 2012. She performed the song twice on the TV show.
- Cass Phang covered this song in Cantonese.
- Heather Headley covered this song on her 2012 album Only One in the World, released just before the opening of the West End production of the musical The Bodyguard, in which Headley sings "Run to You" and plays the equivalent of Houston's role from the film.
- Glennis Grace sang this song as a tribute to Whitney Houston and became a YouTube sensation after Nicki Minaj tweeted about Glennis' performance.
