= Leanne Mitchell (album) =

Studio album by Leanne Mitchell
- Released: 27 May 2013
- Recorded: 2012–13
- Genre: Pop
- Length: 55:45
- Label: Decca

Singles from Leanne Mitchell
- 1. "If I Knew Then" Released: 28 April 2013

Professional ratings
Review scores
Source	Rating
Daily Express	3/5

Leanne Mitchell is the debut album by the winner of Series 1 of The Voice UK, Leanne Mitchell. The album was released by Decca Records on 27 May 2013.

== Track listing ==
No.	Title	Writer(s)	Length
1.	"Pride"	Leanne Mitchell; Paul Meehan; Tim Woodcock	3:38
2.	"No Man's Land" (Beverley Knight cover)	Eg White; Jimmy Hogarth	3:33
3.	"To Love Someone Like You"	Robin Smith	5:14
4.	"If I Knew Then"	Mitchell; Ben Adams; Lee McCutcheon	3:06
5.	"Pull Me To Pieces"	Coyle Girelli; Peter-John Vetesse	3:28
6.	"Walk You Home"	Mitchell; Adams; McCutchean	3:54
7.	"If Loving You Is Wrong"	Carl Hampton; Homer Banks; Raymond Jackson	3:46
8.	"Something About You"	Mitchell; Carolyn Jordan; Craig Hardy	3:22
9.	"Stranger In The Room"	Mitchell; Meehan; Woodcock	3:51
10.	"Keep On Waiting"	Mitchell	3:05
11.	"Deep Blue Sea"	Mitchell; McCutcheon; Patrick Mascall; Paul Barry	4:01
12.	"I Put a Spell on You" (Screamin' Jay Hawkins cover)	Screamin' Jay Hawkins	2:27
Total length:			43:17

Deluxe edition bonus tracks
No.	Title	Length
13.	"If I Knew Then (Acoustic Live in London)"	3:10
14.	"Pride (Acoustic Live in London)"	4:07
15.	"It's a Man's World (Acoustic Live in London)"	2:23
16.	"I Put a Spell on You (Acoustic Live in London)"	2:30
Total length:		55:45

== Charts ==
Chart (2013)	Peak position
UK Albums Chart	134
