= Abi Sampa =

British Indian classical singer

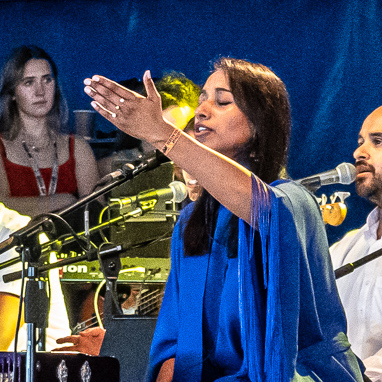
- Sampa in 2023

Background information
- Genres: Qawwali, Carnatic and Western music
- Instrument: vocals

Abi Sampa is a singer from London in the Indian classical tradition. She appeared in The Voice UK in 2013. She sings Qawwali, Carnatic and Western music. She was the first singer from an Asian tradition to appear on The Voice. She and Rushil Ranjan formed Orchestral Qawwali in 2020.

== Life ==
Sampa was born in about 1986 and brought up in London by her Hindu Tamil parents from Sri Lanka. By the age of seven she playing the veena and she discovered her singing talent while performing Carnatic.

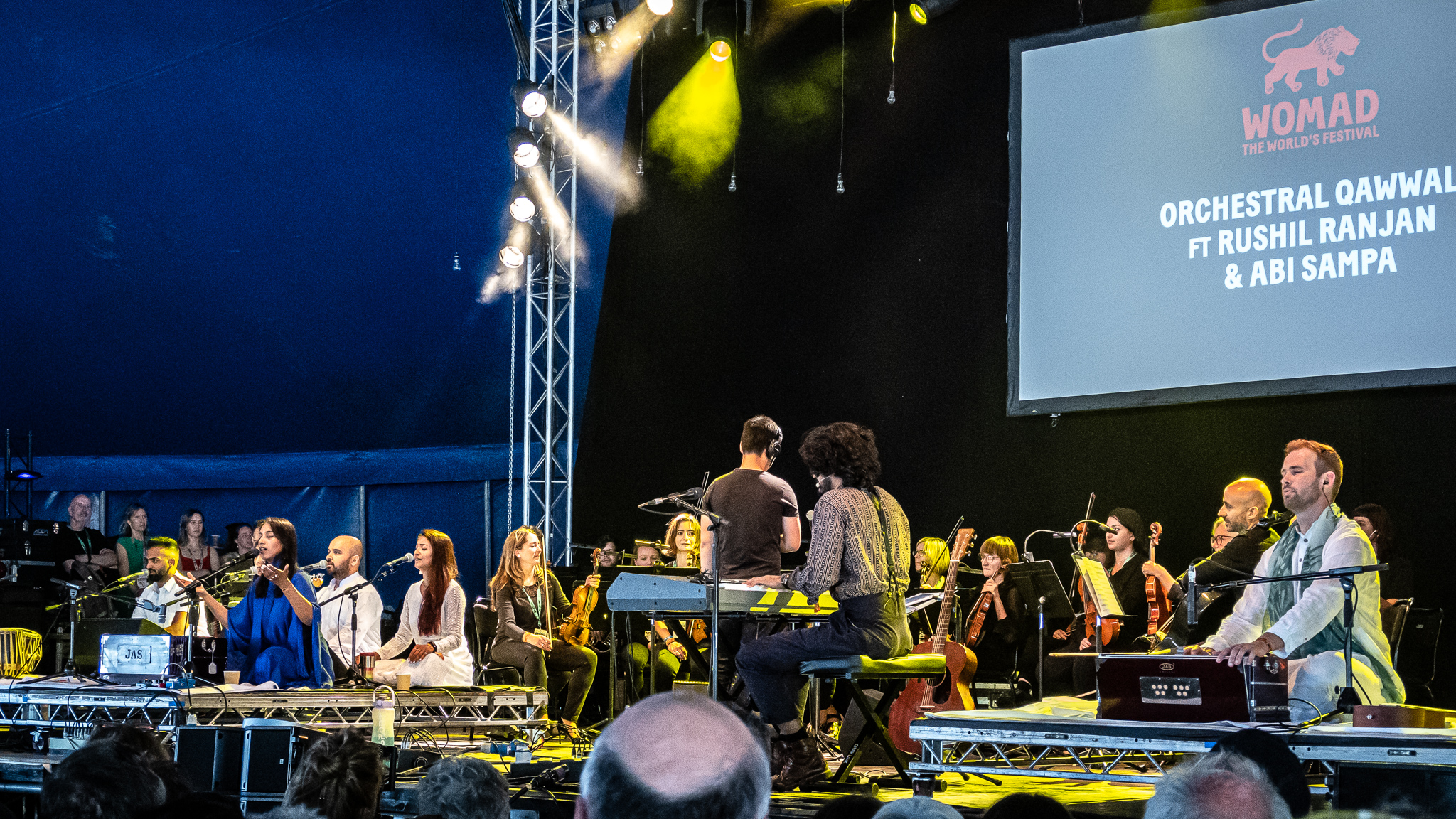
Orchestral Qawwali at WOMAD 2023

She qualified as a dentist in 2011, and continues to practice dental work in London after her rise to fame on The Voice.

She accompanies herself on the Veena and other Asian instruments, generally with other musicians.

She supported Bryan Adams's tour of India in Ahmedabad in 2018 and was involved in the remake of We Are the World in 2018.

In 2020 during lockdown the duo of Sampa and Rushil Ranjan (aka Orchestral Qawwali) released their first qawwali titled, Man Kunto Maula. Their version of the 700 year old song was viewed four million times on YouTube.

They have played with the Firdaus Orchestra and sold out the Southbank centre.

In 2024, she along with Rushil Ranjan were honoured with the Art and Culture award at the Asian Achievers Awards for their contribution to music, blending South Asian heritage with contemporary sound and performance.
