= Hirsch Perlman =

American sculptor

Daniel Hirsch Perlman (born 1960) is a contemporary artist who lives and works in Los Angeles, California. He is a professor of sculpture at UCLA. His work has been exhibited at the Museum of Modern Art, the Whitney Museum of American Art, and P.S.1 in New York. In 2010, Perlman's work was featured in the exhibition Stop. Move. at Blum & Poe Gallery in Los Angeles. He is represented by Blum & Poe Gallery in Los Angeles, California

== Education ==
Perlman attended Yale University in New Haven, Connecticut.

== Work ==
Hirsch Perlman’s oeuvre spans sculpture, scripted film, stop-motion animation and photography. His experimental, accumulative, and often time-based practice draws the viewer into his rigorous tests of visual and literal, and the limits of control. He implements simple materials and clichés, reworked to produce poignant and unexpected results. His large silk-screen prints of cat drawings entitled Schrödinger Cats are named for the Austrian physicist’s experiment to illustrate the paradox of quantum mechanics and the contingencies of physical context. The emblematic cat trapped in a box, and simultaneously dead and alive has been co-opted by popular and science-fiction writers from Robert Anton Wilson to Douglas Adams. In the early 1990s, Perlman produced a series of works around the theme of evidence, several of which were included in the 1992 exhibition Exhibit A, held at the Serpentine Gallery, in London.

== Recent solo exhibitions ==
2009

Gallery Min Min, Tokyo, Japan

2007

ergo despero, Blum & Poe, Los Angeles, CA

Gallery Min Min, Tokyo, Japan

Gallery Nieves Fernandez, Madrid, Spain

The Robert Miller Gallery, New York, NY

2006

Drammens Museum, Drammens, Norway

Saint-Gaudens Memorial Picture Gallery, Cornish, NH

2005

Gimpel Fils, London, UK

Gallery Min Min, Tokyo, Japan

Drammens Museum, Drammen, Norway

2004

Blum & Poe, Los Angeles, CA
