= The Voice UK series 2 =

Second series of The Voice UK

The Voice UK
- Series 2
- Hosted by: Holly Willoughby; Reggie Yates
- Coaches: will.i.am; Sir Tom Jones; Jessie J; Danny O'Donoghue
- Winner: Andrea Begley
- Winning coach: Danny O'Donoghue
- Runners-up: Leah McFall and Mike Ward
- Finals venue: Pinewood Studios
- No. of episodes: 15

Release
- Original network: BBC One
- Original release: 30 March – 22 June 2013

Series chronology
- ← Previous; Series 1 Next → Series 3

The Voice UK is a British television music competition to find new singing talent. The second series was hosted by Holly Willoughby and Reggie Yates on BBC One and started on 30 March 2013. On 13 November 2012, it was confirmed that all four coaches from last year would return.

On 22 June 2013, it was announced that Andrea Begley was the winner of The Voice UK, marking Danny O'Donoghue's first and only win as coach.

This was the final series to feature Jessie J and Danny O'Donoghue as coaches, and Holly Willoughby and Reggie Yates as co-presenters.

== Coaches and presenters ==
Coaches and Presenters for series 2 of The Voice UK

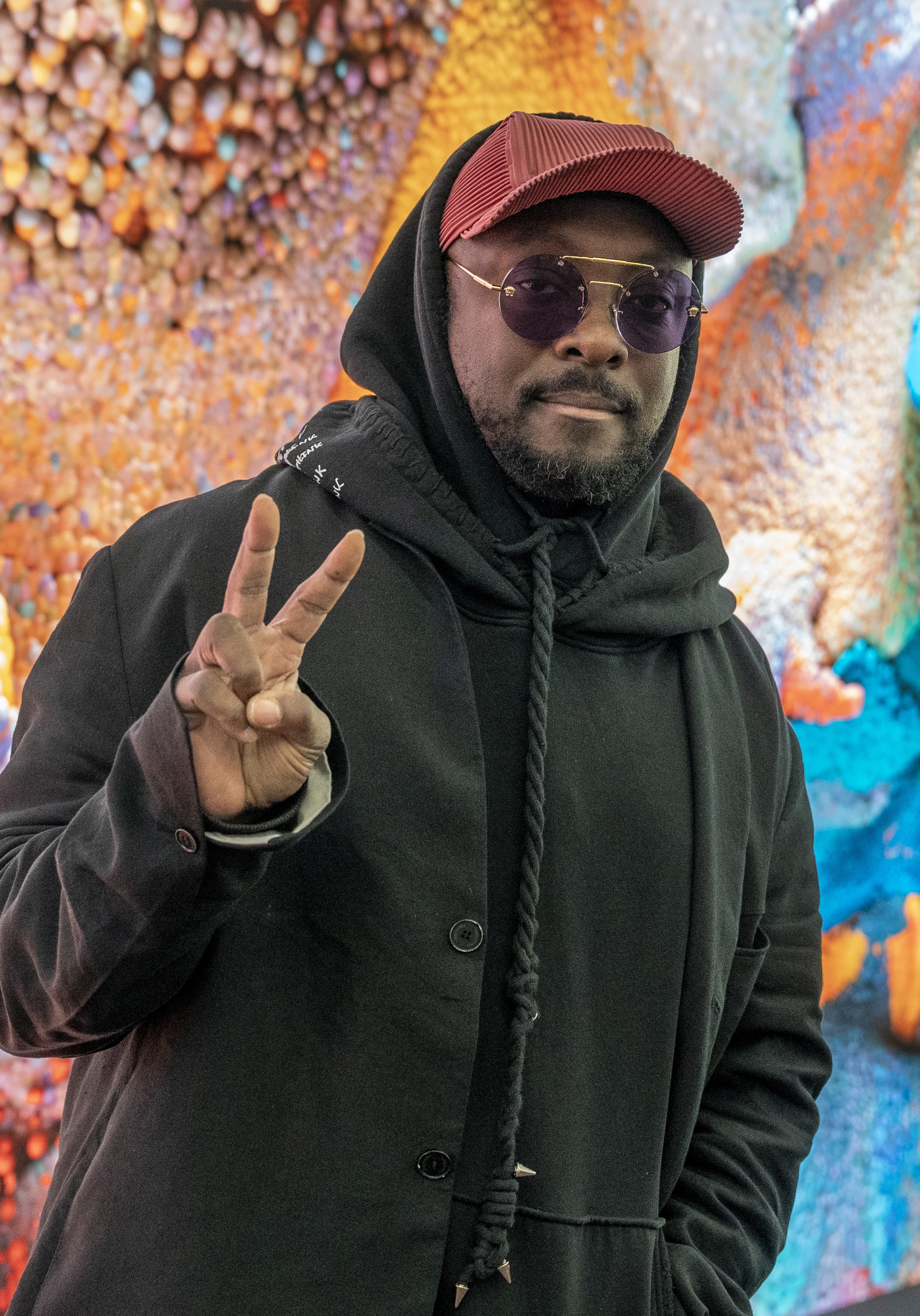
will.i.am

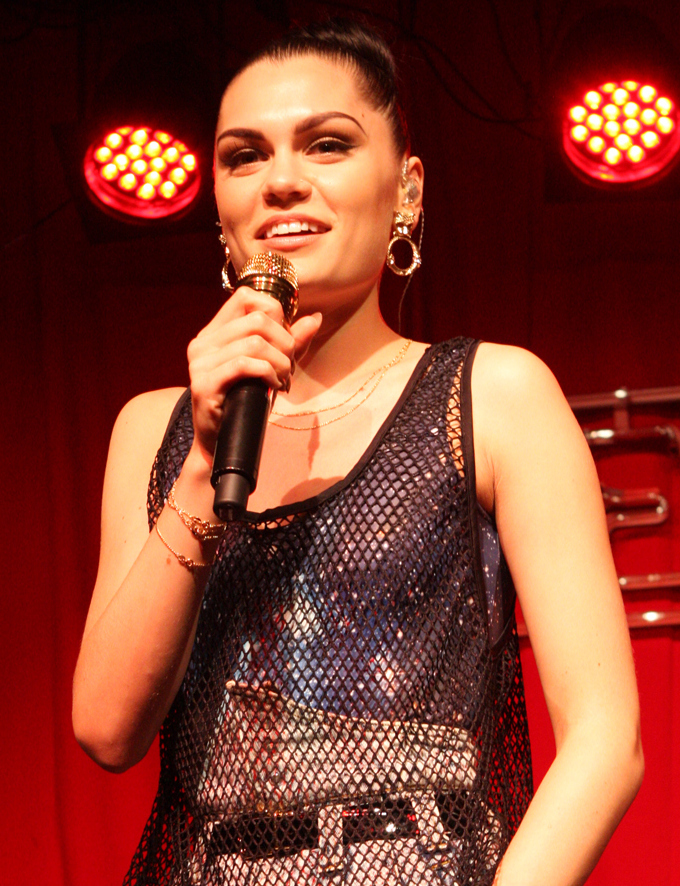
Jessie J

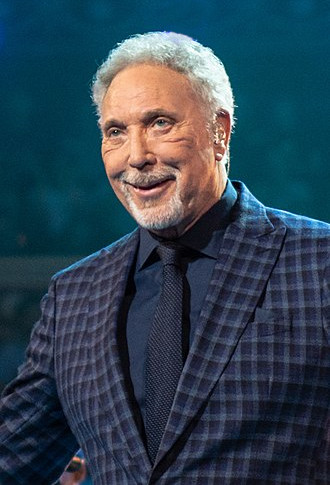
Sir Tom Jones

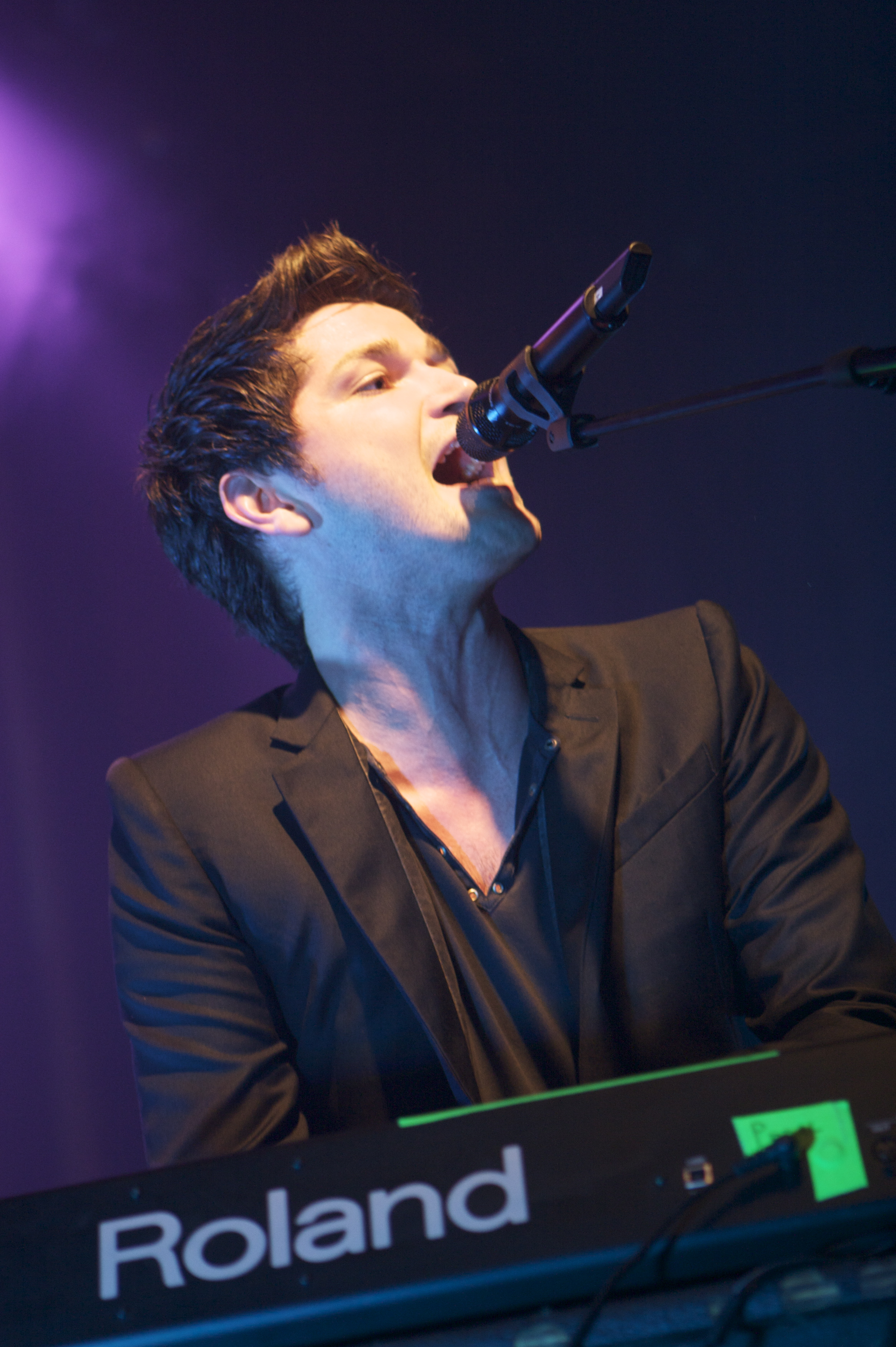
Danny O'Donoghue

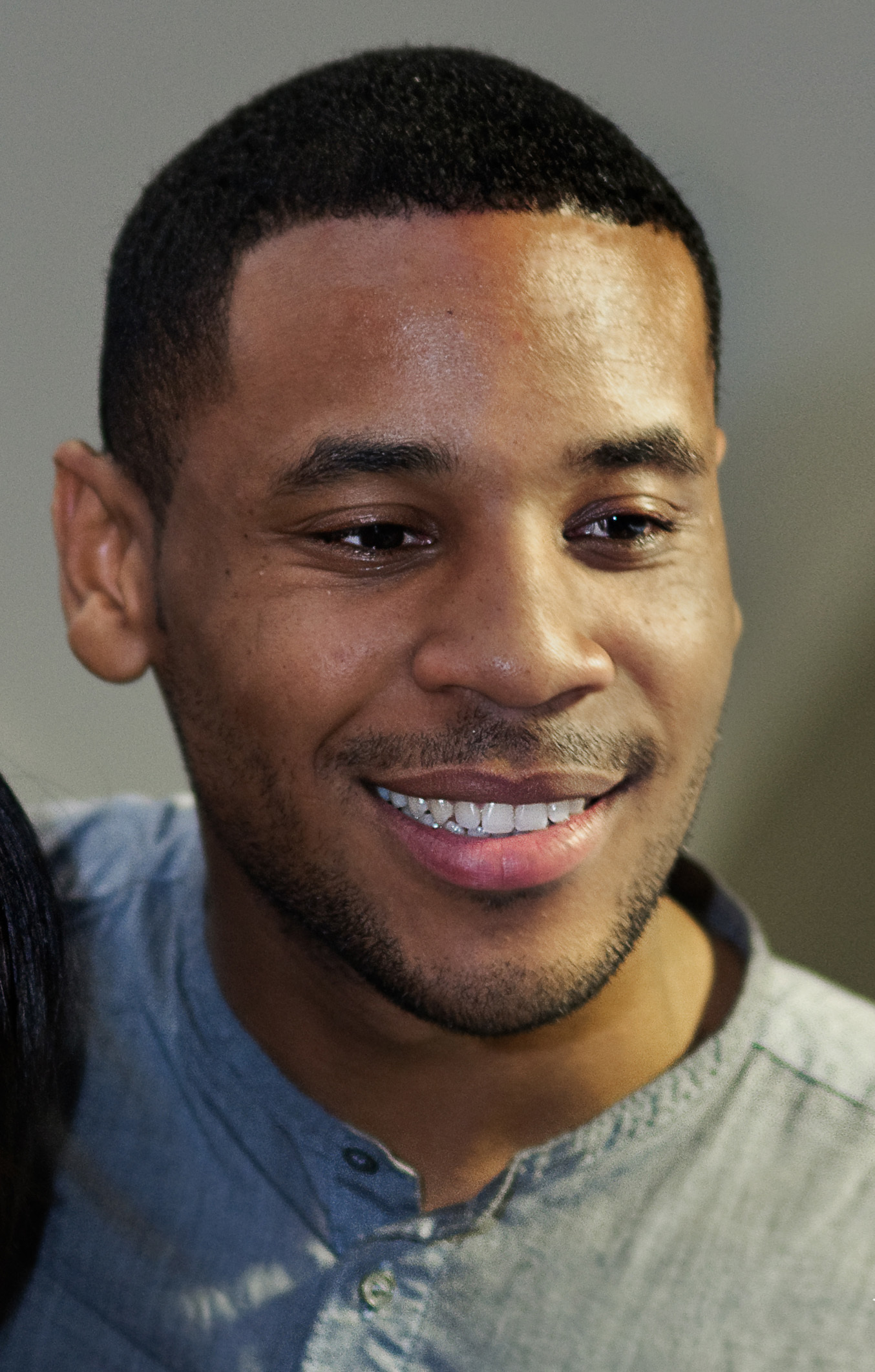
Reggie Yates (host)

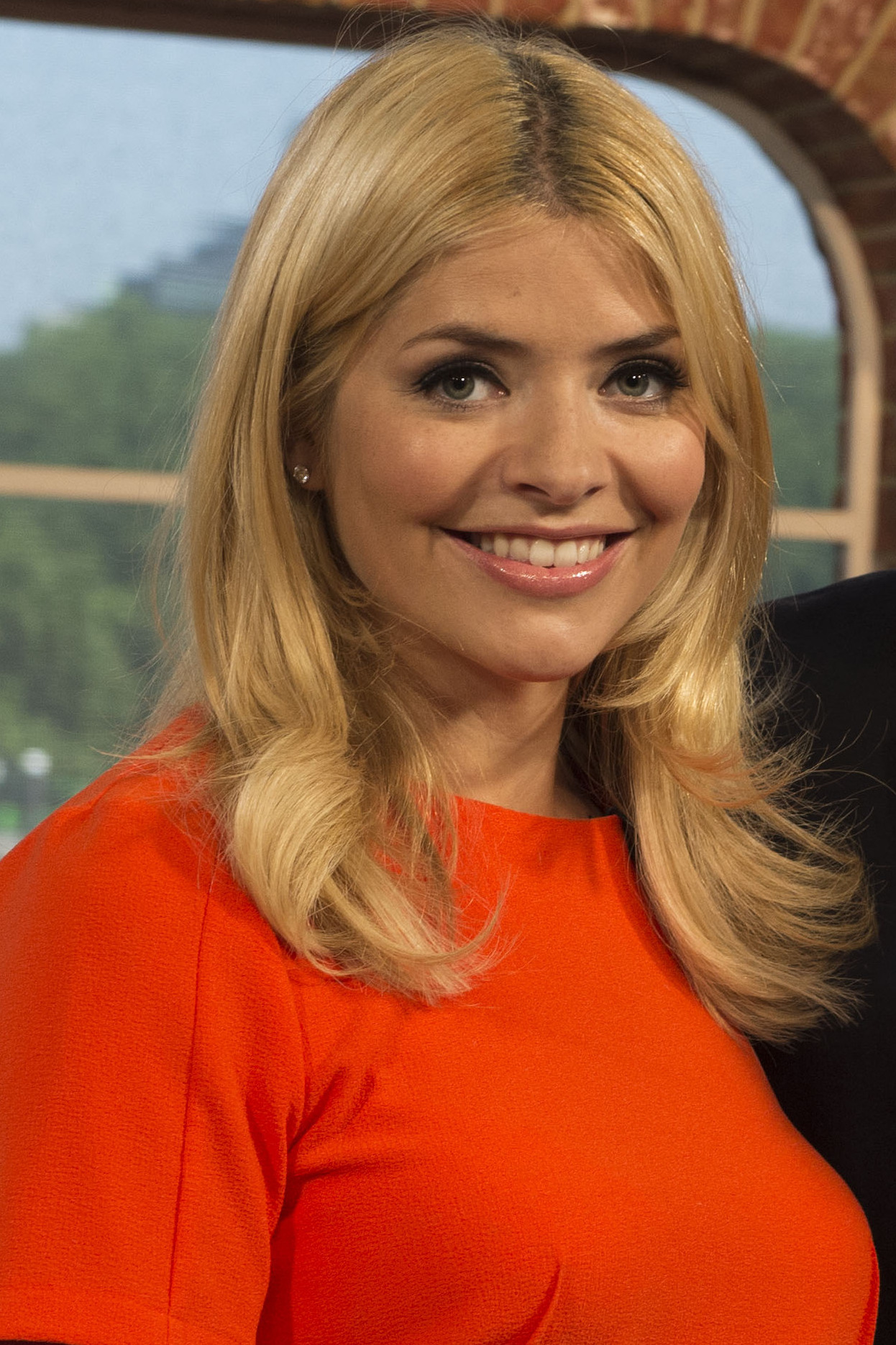
Holly Willoughby (host)

Upon the conclusion of the first series, it was reported that Jessie J was of threat to be axed from her position as a coach, after publicly criticising the programme’s production values. Cheryl, Kylie Minogue, Adele, Rihanna and Kelly Rowland were notable names suggested by the media as potential replacements. It was also suggested that Sir Tom Jones may also leave the series, Amidst speculation that Cliff Richard had been lined up to join the coaching line-up, which was later denied by the BBC.

In November 2012, it was confirmed that will.i.am, Jessie J, Sir Tom Jones and Danny O'Donoghue would all be returning as coaches for the second series. Additionally, it was confirmed that both Holly Willoughby and Reggie Yates would reprise their duties as presenters.

== Production ==
The show's Blind Auditions moved to dock10, MediaCityUK in Salford, Greater Manchester. It was also confirmed that the live show format would be tweaked for this series, which included the cutback from six live shows in the first series to only three live shows, and the pre-recorded results show had also been dropped, with the results given on the same night as the performances. On 28 February 2013, four ten-second teaser trailers were posted to the show's official website and YouTube page.

== Teams ==
The teams were revealed during the 4 May 2013 episode of the blind auditions.

Colour key

- Winner
- Runner-up
- Third place
- Eliminated in the live shows
- Eliminated in the Knockouts
- Artist was stolen by another coach in the Battle rounds (Name is strike-throughed)
- Eliminated in the Battle rounds

Coaches	Top 48 Artists				
will.i.am					
will.i.am	Leah McFall	Cleo Higgins	Leanne Jarvis	Jordan Lee Davies	Lem Knights
will.i.am	John Pritchard	Moni Tivony	~~Matt Henry~~	Nu-tarna	Carla & Barbara
will.i.am	Liam Tamne	CJ Edwards	Emily Worton		
Jessie J					
Jessie J	Matt Henry	Ash Morgan	Sarah Cassidy	Danny County	Trevor Francis
Jessie J	Letitia Grant-Brown	Lovelle Hill	~~Adam Barron~~	~~Lem Knights~~	~~Alex Buchanan~~
Jessie J	Katie Benbow	De' Vide	Nate James		
Sir Tom Jones					
Sir Tom Jones	Mike Ward	Joseph Apostol	Alys Williams	Adam Barron	Cherelle Basquine
Sir Tom Jones	Jamie Bruce	Ragsy	Emma Jade Garbutt	Diva	Lareena Mitchell
Sir Tom Jones	Elise Evans	LB Robinson	Colin Chisholm		
Danny O'Donoghue					
Danny O'Donoghue	Andrea Begley	Karl Michael	Mitchel Emms	Alex Buchanan	Sean Rumsey
Danny O'Donoghue	Abi Sampa	Conor Scott	Laura Oakes	Nadeem Leigh	Ricardo Afonso
Danny O'Donoghue	Paul Carden	Alice Barlow	Smith & Jones		
Stolen contestants are italicized.

== Blind auditions ==
The blind auditions began in Salford, Greater Manchester on 14 December 2012 at dock10, MediaCityUK after moving from BBC Television Centre in London. Each coach had the length of the artists' performance to decide if they wanted that artist on their team. Should two or more coaches have wanted the same artist, then the artist chose their coach. Once the coaches picked their team, they pitted them against each other in the battles.

Colour key
✔	Coach hit his/her "I WANT YOU" button
	Artist defaulted to this coach's team
	Artist elected to join this coach's team
	Artist eliminated with no coach pressing his or her "I WANT YOU" button
	Artist received an 'All Turn'.

=== Episode 1 (30 March) ===
The 95-minute first blind audition episode was broadcast on 30 March 2013 and aired from 7.00pm until 8.35pm.

Group performance: The Voice UK coaches – Medley of "Rip It Up" / "Johnny B. Goode"/ "Shout" / "Long Tall Sally"

Order	Artist	Age	Song	Coaches and artists choices			
Order	Artist	Age	Song	will.i.am	Jessie	Tom	Danny
1	Ash Morgan	27	"Never Tear Us Apart"	✔	✔	✔	✔
2	Danny County	22	"About You Now"	—	✔	—	✔
3	Leanne Jarvis	24	"Stay with Me"	✔	✔	✔	✔
4	Louis Coupe	16	"Learn to Fly"	—	—	—	—
5	Andrea Begley	26	"Angel"	—	—	✔	✔
6	Kirsty Crawford	29	"Hedonism (Just Because You Feel Good)"	—	—	—	—
7	Mike Ward	22	"Don't Close Your Eyes"	—	✔	✔	✔
8	Katie Benbow	20	"Feeling Good"	—	✔	—	—
9	Anthony Kavanagh	35	"Don't Dream It's Over"	—	—	—	—
10	Matt Henry	34	"Trouble"	✔	✔	✔	✔

=== Episode 2 (6 April) ===
The 90-minute second episode was broadcast on 6 April 2013 and aired from 7.00pm until 8.30pm.

Order	Artist	Age	Song	Coaches and artists choices			
Order	Artist	Age	Song	will.i.am	Jessie	Tom	Danny
1	Trevor Francis	30	"A Change Is Gonna Come"	✔	✔	✔	✔
2	Emma Jade Garbutt	18	"Sweet Child o' Mine"	—	—	✔	—
3	Sam Hollyman	17	"Your Song"	—	—	—	—
4	Alex Buchanan	23	"Don't Wake Me Up"	✔	✔	✔	✔
5	Lorraine Crosby	52	"Midnight Train to Georgia"	—	—	—	—
6	Ragsy	34	"The Scientist"	—	—	✔	✔
7	Smith & Jones	19 & 20	"Candy"	—	—	—	✔
8	Liam Tamne	27	"This Woman's Work"	✔	✔	✔	✔
9	Kym Mazelle	52	"Ring of Fire"	—	—	—	—
10	Nadeem Leigh	34	"I Still Haven't Found What I'm Looking For"/"The Blower's Daughter"	—	—	—	✔
11	Nick Dixon	16	"I Won't Give Up"	—	—	—	—
12	Alys Williams	25	"The Cave"	✔	✔	✔	✔

=== Episode 3 (13 April) ===
The 90-minute third episode was broadcast on 13 April 2013 and aired from 6.45pm until 8.15pm.

Order	Artist	Age	Song	Coaches and artists choices			
Order	Artist	Age	Song	will.i.am	Jessie	Tom	Danny
1	Cleo Higgins	30	"Love on Top"	✔	✔	✔	✔
2	Barry James Thomas	49	"The Boys Are Back In Town"	—	—	—	—
3	Mitchel Emms	19	"Best of You"	—	—	—	✔
4	Elise Evans	18	"Something's Got a Hold on Me"	✔	✔	✔	✔
5	Emma Louise Jackson	23	"River Deep – Mountain High"	—	—	—	—
6	Conor Scott	18	"Starry Eyed"	—	—	—	✔
7	Amy Wilkinson	27	"She Wolf (Falling to Pieces)"	—	—	—	—
8	Diva	41 & 43	"Tell Him"	—	✔	✔	—
9	Leah McFall	23	"R.I.P."	✔	✔	—	—
10	Lovelle Hill	22	"Diamonds"	✔	✔	✔	—
11	Lem Knights	18	"Do It like a Dude"	—	✔	✔	✔

=== Episode 4 (20 April) ===
The 65-minute fourth episode was broadcast on 20 April 2013 and aired from 8.20pm until 9.25pm.

Order	Artist	Age	Song	Coaches and artists choices			
Order	Artist	Age	Song	will.i.am	Jessie	Tom	Danny
1	Alice Fredenham	28	"The Lady Is a Tramp"	—	—	—	—
2	Sarah Cassidy	31	"Let's Stay Together"	—	✔	✔	✔
3	Emily Worton	18	"Common People"	✔	—	—	—
4	Nick Tatham	29	"Footloose"	—	—	—	—
5	Tom Gregory	17	"For the First Time"	—	—	—	—
6	Laura Prescott	N/A	"Who You Are"	—	—	—	—
7	LB Robinson	32	"She's a Lady"	—	—	✔	—
8	Carla & Barbara	47 & 54	"The Flower Duet"	✔	✔	✔	✔
9	David Kidd	N/A	"Life on Mars?"	—	—	—	—
10	Laura Oakes	22	"Spectrum (Say My Name)"	—	—	—	✔
11	Jessica Steele	21	"Don't You Want Me"	—	—	—	—
12	Karl Michael	26	"No More I Love You's"	✔	✔	✔	✔

=== Episode 5 (27 April) ===
The 85-minute fifth episode was broadcast on 27 April 2013 and aired from 8.05pm until 9.25pm.

Order	Artist	Age	Song	Coaches and artists choices			
Order	Artist	Age	Song	will.i.am	Jessie	Tom	Danny
1	Jamie Bruce	34	"Try a Little Tenderness"	✔	—	✔	—
2	Jordan Lee Davies	22	"I Believe in a Thing Called Love"	✔	—	—	✔
3	Charlie Ryan	N/A	"Let's Get It On"	—	—	—	—
4	Aret Kapetanovic	N/A	"Upside Down"	—	—	—	—
5	Cherelle Basquine	25	"Call My Name"	—	—	✔	—
6	Ricardo Afonso	38	"Hard to Handle"	—	—	✔	✔
7	Sean Rumsey	26	"Payphone"	—	—	✔	✔
8	Alice Barlow	21	"Call Me Maybe"	—	—	✔	✔
9	Katie Evans	24	"You've Got the Love"/"Feel the Love"	—	—	—	—
10	Nu-Tarna	32 & 31	"Part of Me"	✔	—	—	—
11	Gemma Marshall	N/A	"How We Do (Party)"	—	—	—	—
12	Eva Iglesias	39	"And I Am Telling You I'm Not Going"	—	—	—	—
13	Ant Henson	23	"All These Things That I've Done"	—	—	—	—
14	Em Brulée	N/A	"Hound Dog"	—	—	—	—
15	Cassie Chan	N/A	"Too Close"	—	—	—	—
16	Gill Forster	N/A	"Cry to Me"	—	—	—	—
17	Nate James	33	"Crazy"	—	✔	—	✔
18	De' Vide	24 & 33	"My Girl"	—	✔	—	—
19	Lareena Mitchell	33	"Walking on Broken Glass"	—	—	✔	—
20	Colin Chisholm	60	"I Drove All Night"	—	—	✔	—
21	Paul Carden	31	"Locked Out of Heaven"	—	—	—	✔

=== Episode 6 (4 May) ===
The 80-minute sixth episode was broadcast on 4 May 2013 from 8.05pm until 9.25pm.

Order	Artist	Age	Song	Coaches and artists choices			
Order	Artist	Age	Song	will.i.am	Jessie	Tom	Danny
1	Adenikè Adenaike	23	"Sweet Love"	—	—	—	—
2	John Pritchard	31	"Wicked Game"	✔	—	—	—
3	Letitia Grant-Brown	17	"Bust Your Windows"	—	✔	—	—
4	Danny Foster	33	"Wannabe"	—	—	—	—
5	Jay Aston	51	"Time Is Running Out"	—	—	—	—
6	Moni Tivony	32	"No Woman, No Cry"	✔	✔	✔	✔
7	Abi Sampa	27	"Stop Crying Your Heart Out"	—	—	—	✔
8	Joseph Apostol	21	"Will You Still Love Me Tomorrow"	—	✔	✔	Team Full
9	Brett Davison	28	"Fast Car"	—	—	Team Full	Team Full
10	Bronwen Lewis	19	"Fields of Gold"	—	—	Team Full	Team Full
11	Adam Barron	27	"Summertime"	—	✔	Team Full	Team Full
12	Sophie Mendoza	N/A	"Daddy"	—	Team Full	Team Full	Team Full
13	Georgia Thursting	N/A	"Romeo"	—	Team Full	Team Full	Team Full
14	Julie E Gordon	39	"Creep"	—	Team Full	Team Full	Team Full
15	Rita Payne	N/A	"Billie Jean"	—	Team Full	Team Full	Team Full
16	Laine Hines	N/A	"Baby Jane"	—	Team Full	Team Full	Team Full
17	Gemma Louise Edwards	N/A	"Habanera"	—	Team Full	Team Full	Team Full
18	Rob Reynolds	45	"Wish You Were Here"	—	Team Full	Team Full	Team Full
19	CJ Edwards	24	"Dedication to My Ex (Miss That)"	✔	Team Full	Team Full	Team Full

== Battle rounds ==
The recording of the battle rounds took place on 9 and 10 February 2013 at The Fountain Studios and aired on 11, 12 and 25 May 2013. This year's battle rounds featured a new "steal" twist. After each battle round the losing artist then pitched to the other three coaches on why they should join their team. It was then up to the coaches (who have a limited amount of time) to press their red button to steal the artist. They could press their button as many times as they liked but were only allowed to steal one artist. If more than one coach wanted to steal the same artist then it was up to the artist to decide which team to join. The first battle rounds episode aired from 8.35pm until 9.50pm, the second aired on from 7.00pm until 8.00pm and the third ran for 130 minutes from 7.10pm until 9.20pm (There was no episode on 18 May due to the Eurovision Song Contest).

The battle round advisors were will.i.am working with Dante Santiago, Jessie J with Claude Kelly, Tom Jones with Cerys Matthews and Danny O'Donoghue with Dido.

Colour key

✔	Coach hit his/her "I WANT YOU" button
	Artist won the Battle and advanced to the Knockouts
	Artist lost the Battle but was stolen by another coach and advances to the Knockouts
	Artist lost the Battle and was eliminated

Episode	Coach	Order	Winner	Song	Loser	'Steal' result			
Episode	Coach	Order	Winner	Song	Loser	will.i.am	Jessie	Tom	Danny
Episode 1 (11 May)	Tom Jones	1	Jamie Bruce	"When Love Comes to Town"	LB Robinson	—	—	—N/a	—
Episode 1 (11 May)	will.i.am	2	Jordan Lee Davies	"Do I Do"	Matt Henry	—N/a	✔	✔	—
Episode 1 (11 May)	Danny O'Donoghue	3	Andrea Begley	"People Help the People"	Alice Barlow	—	Steal used	—	—N/a
Episode 1 (11 May)	Jessie J	4	Sarah Cassidy	"E.T."	Katie Benbow	—	Steal used	—	—
Episode 1 (11 May)	will.i.am	5	Cleo Higgins	"Finally"	Nu-tarna	—N/a	Steal used	—	—
Episode 1 (11 May)	Jessie J	6	Ash Morgan	"I Won't Let You Go"	Adam Barron	—	Steal used	✔	✔
Episode 2 (12 May)	will.i.am	1	Leanne Jarvis	"Hero"	Carla & Barbara	—N/a	Steal used	Steal used	—
Episode 2 (12 May)	Tom Jones	2	Cherelle Basquine	"All About Tonight"	Elise Evans	—	Steal used	Steal used	—
Episode 2 (12 May)	Jessie J	3	Danny County	"Best I Ever Had"	De' Vide	—	Steal used	Steal used	—
Episode 2 (12 May)	will.i.am	4	Leah McFall	"The Way You Make Me Feel"	CJ Edwards	—N/a	Steal used	Steal used	—
Episode 2 (12 May)	Jessie J	5	Lovelle Hill	"No Air"	Nate James	—	Steal used	Steal used	—
Episode 2 (12 May)	Danny O'Donoghue	6	Conor Scott	"Some Nights"	Smith & Jones	—	Steal used	Steal used	—N/a
Episode 3 (25 May)	Danny O'Donoghue	1	Mitchel Emms	"Are You Gonna Be My Girl"	Ricardo Afonso	—	Steal used	Steal used	—N/a
Episode 3 (25 May)	Tom Jones	2	Mike Ward	"Landslide"	Emma Jade Garbutt	—	Steal used	Steal used	—
Episode 3 (25 May)	Jessie J	3	Letitia Grant-Brown	"Family Affair"	Alex Buchanan	✔	Steal used	Steal used	✔
Episode 3 (25 May)	Tom Jones	4	Joseph Apostol	"Don't Let the Sun Go Down on Me"	Diva	—	Steal used	Steal used	Steal used
Episode 3 (25 May)	Danny O'Donoghue	5	Abi Sampa	"Heaven"	Laura Oakes	—	Steal used	Steal used	Steal used
Episode 3 (25 May)	will.i.am	6	John Pritchard	"Easy Lover"	Liam Tamne	—N/a	Steal used	Steal used	Steal used
Episode 3 (25 May)	Jessie J	7	Trevor Francis	"Soul Man"	Lem Knights	✔	Steal used	Steal used	Steal used
Episode 3 (25 May)	Tom Jones	8	Alys Williams	"Rambling Man"	Lareena Mitchell	Steal used	Steal used	Steal used	Steal used
Episode 3 (25 May)	Danny O'Donoghue	9	Sean Rumsey	"I'm a Man"	Paul Carden	Steal used	Steal used	Steal used	Steal used
Episode 3 (25 May)	will.i.am	10	Moni Tivony	"Little Talks"	Emily Worton	Steal used	Steal used	Steal used	Steal used
Episode 3 (25 May)	Tom Jones	11	Ragsy	"Starlight"	Colin Chisholm	Steal used	Steal used	Steal used	Steal used
Episode 3 (25 May)	Danny O'Donoghue	12	Karl Michael	"Red"	Nadeem Leigh	Steal used	Steal used	Steal used	Steal used

== Knockout rounds ==
The recording of the knockout rounds took place at The Fountain Studios on 21 February 2013 and aired on 1 and 2 June 2013. Before each knockout round, the coach chose one artist from their team to get a "fast pass" to the live shows, the remaining six artists from that team were then split up into two groups of three. At the end of each knockout round the coach then decided out of the three artists who won, and therefore made up their three artists to take to the live shows. Episode 1 aired from 8.30pm until 9.40pm, while episode 2 aired from 7.15pm until 8.30pm.

Colour key:

Artist received a Fast pass and advanced to the Live shows
Artist won the Knockouts and advanced to the Live shows
Artist lost the Knockouts and was eliminated

Episode	Coach	Order	Song	Artists		Song
Episode	Coach	Order	Song	Winner	Losers	Song
Episode 1 (1 June)	Tom Jones	1	"Everybody's Got to Learn Sometime"	Alys Williams	Jamie Bruce	"Papa Was a Rollin' Stone"
Episode 1 (1 June)	Tom Jones	1	"Everybody's Got to Learn Sometime"	Alys Williams	Cherelle Basquine	"1+1"
Episode 1 (1 June)	Tom Jones	2	"A Song for You"	Joseph Apostol	Adam Barron	"Maybe I'm Amazed"
Episode 1 (1 June)	Tom Jones	2	"A Song for You"	Joseph Apostol	Ragsy	"Local Boy in the Photograph"
Episode 1 (1 June)	Tom Jones	3	"Just to See You Smile"	Mike Ward	N/A	
Episode 1 (1 June)	will.i.am	4	"Alone"	Leanne Jarvis	Moni Tivony	"Master Blaster"
Episode 1 (1 June)	will.i.am	4	"Alone"	Leanne Jarvis	Jordan Lee Davies	"It's All Coming Back to Me Now"
Episode 1 (1 June)	will.i.am	5	"Leave Me Alone"	Cleo Higgins	John Pritchard	"Something's Gotten Hold of My Heart"
Episode 1 (1 June)	will.i.am	5	"Leave Me Alone"	Cleo Higgins	Lem Knights	"As Long as You Love Me"
Episode 1 (1 June)	will.i.am	6	"Lovin' You"	Leah McFall	N/A	
Episode 2 (2 June)	Jessie J	1	"Ain't No Mountain High Enough"	Sarah Cassidy	Danny County	"Be My Baby"
Episode 2 (2 June)	Jessie J	1	"Ain't No Mountain High Enough"	Sarah Cassidy	Trevor Francis	"Gimme Some Lovin'"
Episode 2 (2 June)	Jessie J	2	"Skinny Love"	Matt Henry	Letitia Grant-Brown	"Love Is a Battlefield"
Episode 2 (2 June)	Jessie J	2	"Skinny Love"	Matt Henry	Lovelle Hill	"True Colors"
Episode 2 (2 June)	Jessie J	3	"Sweet Dreams"	Ash Morgan	N/A	
Episode 2 (2 June)	Danny O'Donoghue	4	"Songbird"	Andrea Begley	Alex Buchanan	"Signed, Sealed, Delivered I'm Yours"
Episode 2 (2 June)	Danny O'Donoghue	4	"Songbird"	Andrea Begley	Abi Sampa	"Iris"
Episode 2 (2 June)	Danny O'Donoghue	5	"Need You Now"	Mitchel Emms	Conor Scott	"Hey, Soul Sister"
Episode 2 (2 June)	Danny O'Donoghue	5	"Need You Now"	Mitchel Emms	Sean Rumsey	"Ain't No Sunshine"
Episode 2 (2 June)	Danny O'Donoghue	6	"Apologize"	Karl Michael	N/A	

== Live shows ==
The live performance shows were aired live from Pinewood Studios and ran for three consecutive weeks, beginning on 7 June 2013. The BBC decided to move the first live show to Friday 7 June to avoid a clash with the Britain's Got Talent final on Saturday 8 June, and the live coverage of the 2013 Canadian Grand Prix on BBC One prevented alternative air dates over the weekend. However, the remaining two live shows still aired on 15 and 22 June 2013.

Jessie J performed her latest single "Wild" on the Final Live Show. The first live show featured a medley of performances from the previous year's winner and finalists, Leanne Mitchell, Bo Bruce, Vince Kidd and Tyler James, and a performance by guest Tom Odell. Avril Lavigne and Beady Eye performed during the semi-final on 15 June. Michael Bublé and Dizzee Rascal featuring Robbie Williams performed on the final on 22 June 2013.

=== Results summary ===
Team’s colour key
Team Will
Team Jessie
Team Tom
Team Danny

Result's colour key
Artist given 'Fast Pass' by their coach and did not face the public vote
Artist received the fewest votes and was eliminated
Artist received the most public votes

Weekly results per artist
Contestant	Week 1	Week 2	Week 3	
Contestant	Week 1	Week 2	Round 1	Round 2
Andrea Begley	Fast Pass	Safe	Safe	Winner (week 3)
Leah McFall	Fast Pass	Safe	Safe	Runner-up (week 3)
Mike Ward	Safe	Safe	Safe	Runner-up (week 3)
Matt Henry	Safe	Safe	4th	Eliminated (week 3)
Ash Morgan	Fast Pass	Eliminated	Eliminated (week 2)	
Cleo Higgins	Safe	Eliminated	Eliminated (week 2)	
Joseph Apostol	Fast Pass	Eliminated	Eliminated (week 2)	
Karl Michael	Safe	Eliminated	Eliminated (week 2)	
Alys Williams	Eliminated	Eliminated (week 1)		
Leanne Jarvis	Eliminated	Eliminated (week 1)		
Mitchel Emms	Eliminated	Eliminated (week 1)		
Sarah Cassidy	Eliminated	Eliminated (week 1)		

=== Live show details ===
==== Week 1: Quarter-final (7 June) ====
The first part aired from 7.00pm until 9.00pm and the second part from 9.30pm until 10.00pm.

After all three artists from each team had performed, the coach then had to decide which artist they want to give a "fast pass" to and put straight through to the semi-final. The voting lines for the remaining artists then opened after all twelve artists had performed.

- Musical guests: Tyler James ("Worry About You"); Vince Kidd ("You & Me"); Bo Bruce ("Save Me"); Leanne Mitchell ("Pride"); Tom Odell ("Another Love")

Order	Coach	Artist	Song	Result
1	Jessie J	Matt Henry	"Wonder"	Bottom two
2	Jessie J	Ash Morgan	"Lego House"	Fast Pass
3	Jessie J	Sarah Cassidy	"Love Sensation"	Eliminated
4	Tom Jones	Alys Williams	"Is This Love"	Eliminated
5	Tom Jones	Joseph Apostol	"(Your Love Keeps Lifting Me) Higher and Higher"	Fast pass
6	Tom Jones	Mike Ward	"When I Was Your Man"	Bottom two
7	Danny O'Donoghue	Andrea Begley	"Ho Hey"	Fast pass
8	Danny O'Donoghue	Mitchel Emms	"Radioactive"	Eliminated
9	Danny O'Donoghue	Karl Michael	"A Thousand Years"	Bottom two
10	will.i.am	Leanne Jarvis	"Where Have You Been"	Eliminated
11	will.i.am	Cleo Higgins	"Imagine"	Bottom two
12	will.i.am	Leah McFall	"I Will Survive"	Fast pass

==== Week 2: Semi-final (15 June) ====
This episode aired from 7.00pm until 9.10pm.

- Group performances: The Voice UK Final 8 ("I Will Wait"); Team will.i.am with will.i.am ("Rapture"); Team Jessie with Jessie J ("Stay"); Team Tom with Tom Jones ("Games People Play"); Team Danny with Danny O'Donoghue ("Let Her Go")
- Musical guests: Avril Lavigne ("Here's to Never Growing Up"); Beady Eye ("Second Bite of the Apple")

Order	Coach	Artist	Song	Result
1	Jessie J	Ash Morgan	"Ex-Factor"	Eliminated
2	Jessie J	Matt Henry	"Girl on Fire"	Safe
3	Danny O'Donoghue	Karl Michael	"I Believe I Can Fly"	Eliminated
4	Danny O'Donoghue	Andrea Begley	"One of Us"	Safe
5	will.i.am	Leah McFall	"Killing Me Softly with His Song"	Safe
6	will.i.am	Cleo Higgins	"Don't Let Go (Love)"	Eliminated
7	Tom Jones	Joseph Apostol	"End of the Road"	Eliminated
8	Tom Jones	Mike Ward	"Picking Up the Pieces"	Safe

==== Week 3: Final (22 June) ====
This episode aired from 7.15pm until 9.25pm.

- Group performance: The Voice UK Coaches ("Get Lucky")
- Musical guests: Dizzee Rascal featuring Robbie Williams ("Goin' Crazy"); Michael Bublé ("Who's Lovin' You");

Order	Coach	Artist	First song	Second song (duet)	Third song	Result
1	Tom Jones	Mike Ward	"Suspicious Minds"	"Green, Green Grass of Home" (with Tom Jones)	"Don't Close Your Eyes"	Runner-up
2	Danny O'Donoghue	Andrea Begley	"My Immortal"	"Hall of Fame" (with Danny O'Donoghue)	"Angel"	Winner
3	Jessie J	Matt Henry	"Babylon"	"Never Too Much" (with Jessie J)	N/A (already eliminated)	Eliminated
4	will.i.am	Leah McFall	"I Will Always Love You"	"Bang Bang" (with will.i.am)	"Lovin' You"	Runner-up

== Reception ==
=== Ratings ===
The earlier shows averaged around 7.5 million viewers, before raising to around 9 million after 14 April once a substantial clash with Britain's Got Talent was avoided.

Episode	Date	Official ratings (in millions)	Weekly rank	Share	Source
Blind auditions 1	30 March	7.47	6	26.9%	
Blind auditions 2	6 April	7.58	5	28.5%	
Blind auditions 3	13 April	7.82	4	26.8%	
Blind auditions 4	20 April	9.50	1	—N/a	
Blind auditions 5	27 April	9.07	1	35.5%	
Blind auditions 6	4 May	9.27	1	35.3%	
Battle rounds 1	11 May	8.86	1	31.8%	
Battle rounds 2	12 May	7.82	3	30.4%	
Battle rounds 3	25 May	6.95	6	29.7%	
Knockout rounds 1	1 June	6.74	3	26.5%	
Knockout rounds 2	2 June	6.36	5	27.0%	
Live show 1	7 June	5.14	6	21.7%	
Live results 1	7 June	4.74	7	19.3%	
Live show 2	15 June	6.55	7	28.1%	
Live final	22 June	7.95	1	34.8%	
Series average	2013	7.45	4	26.8%	
