= The Voice UK series 1 =

First series of The Voice UK

The Voice UK
- Series 1
- Hosted by: Holly Willoughby; Reggie Yates
- Coaches: will.i.am; Sir Tom Jones; Jessie J; Danny O'Donoghue
- Winner: Leanne Mitchell
- Winning mentor: Sir Tom Jones
- Runners-up: Bo Bruce and Tyler James
- Finals venue: Elstree Studios
- No. of episodes: 17

Release
- Original network: BBC One
- Original release: 24 March – 2 June 2012

Series chronology
- Next → Series 2

The Voice UK is a British television music competition to find new singing talent. The first series began on 24 March 2012 and ended on 2 June 2012. The show was co-presented by Holly Willoughby and Reggie Yates on BBC One. The series was won by Leanne Mitchell, who was on Tom Jones' team.

Becky Hill, who was on Jessie J’s team and eliminated in the fifth live show (semi-final) of the competition, reached number one in the UK Singles Chart as a guest vocalist on the hit song, "Gecko (Overdrive)" alongside Dutch DJ Oliver Heldens, and would go on to find further success in the music industry after that.

== Coaches and presenters ==
Coaches and Presenters for series 1 of The Voice UK

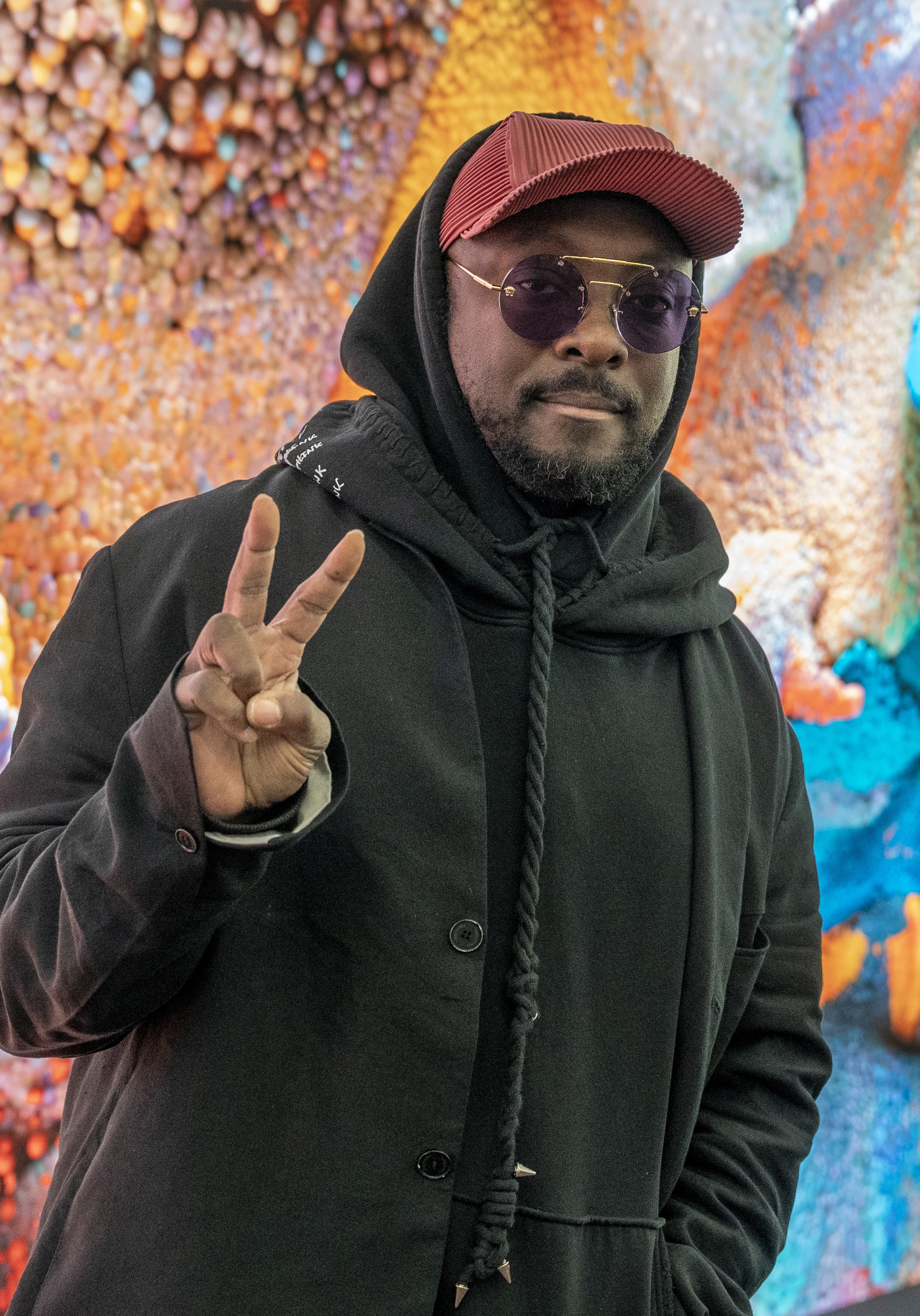
will.i.am

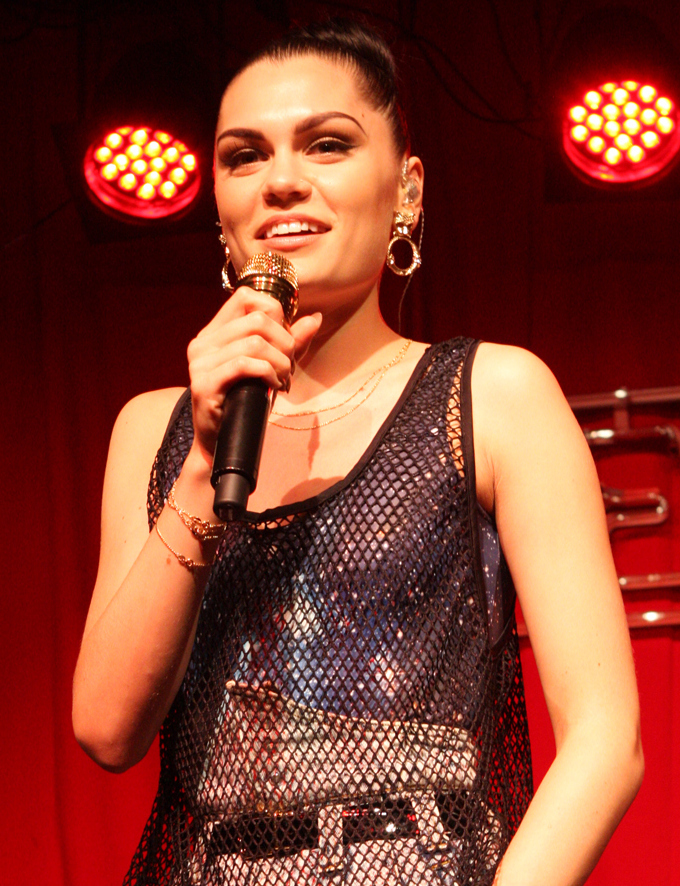
Jessie J

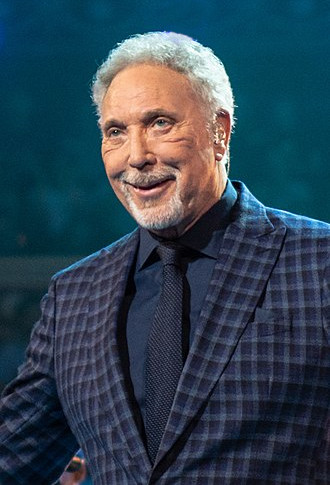
Sir Tom Jones

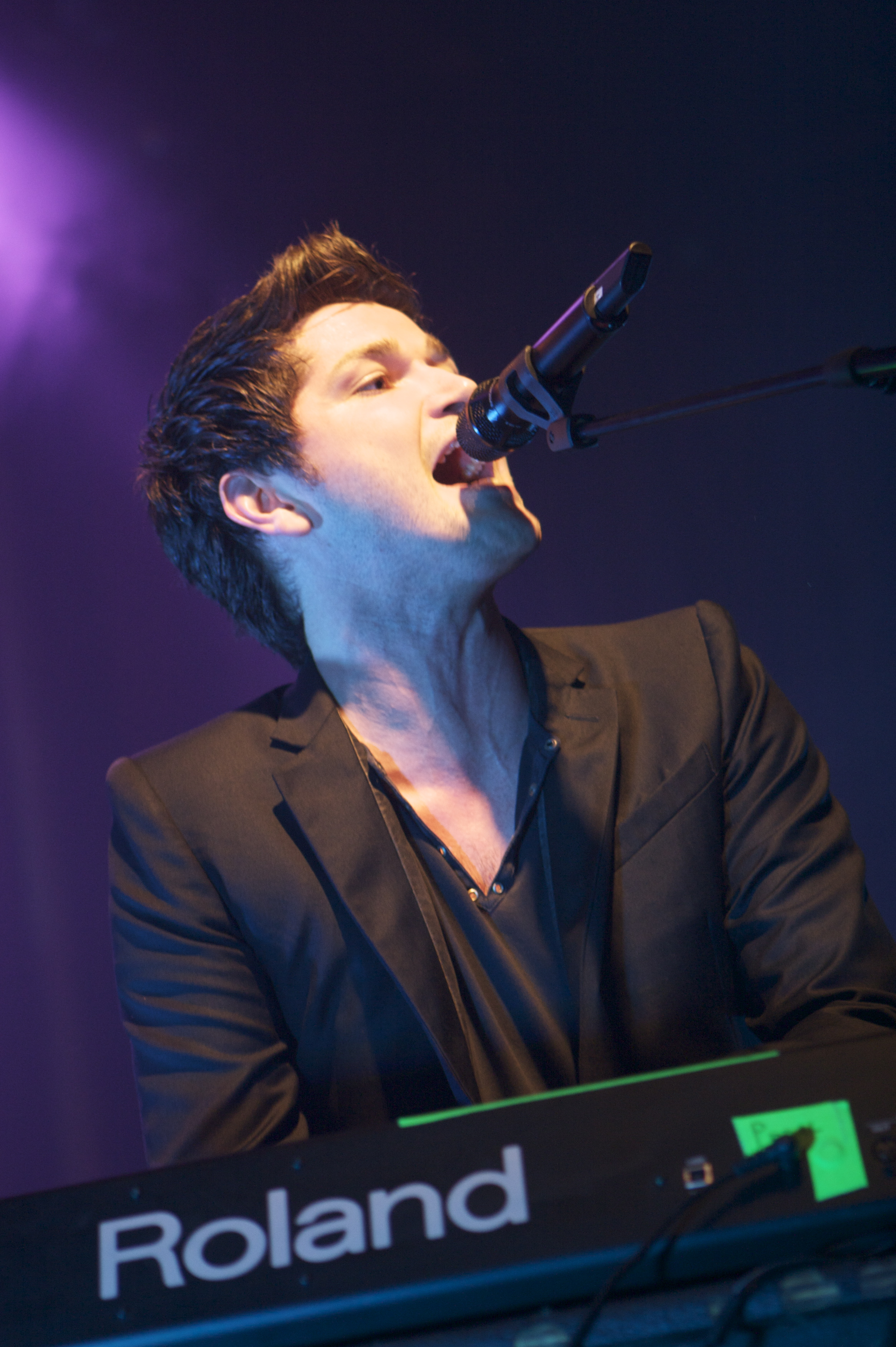
Danny O'Donoghue

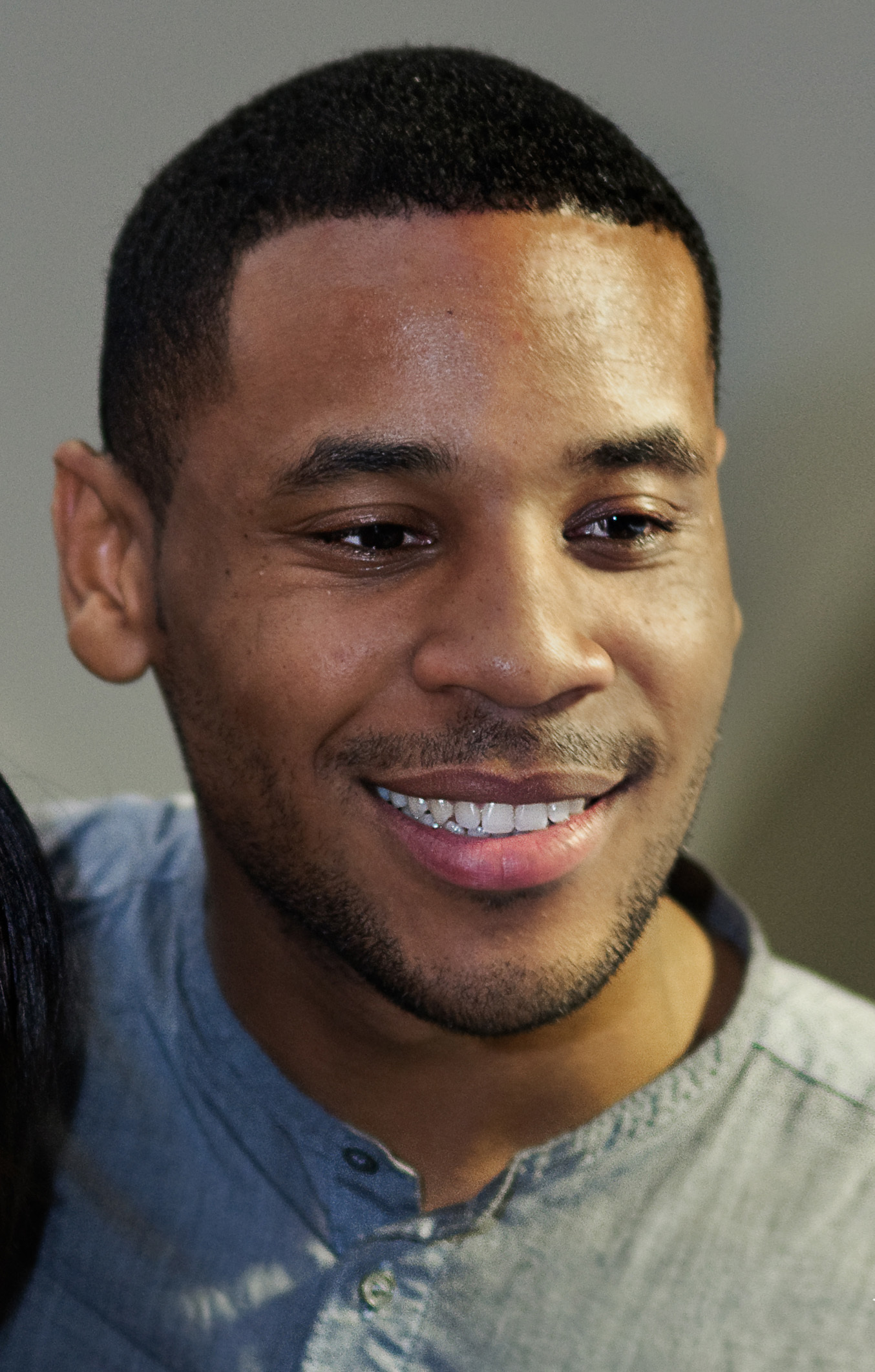
Reggie Yates (host)

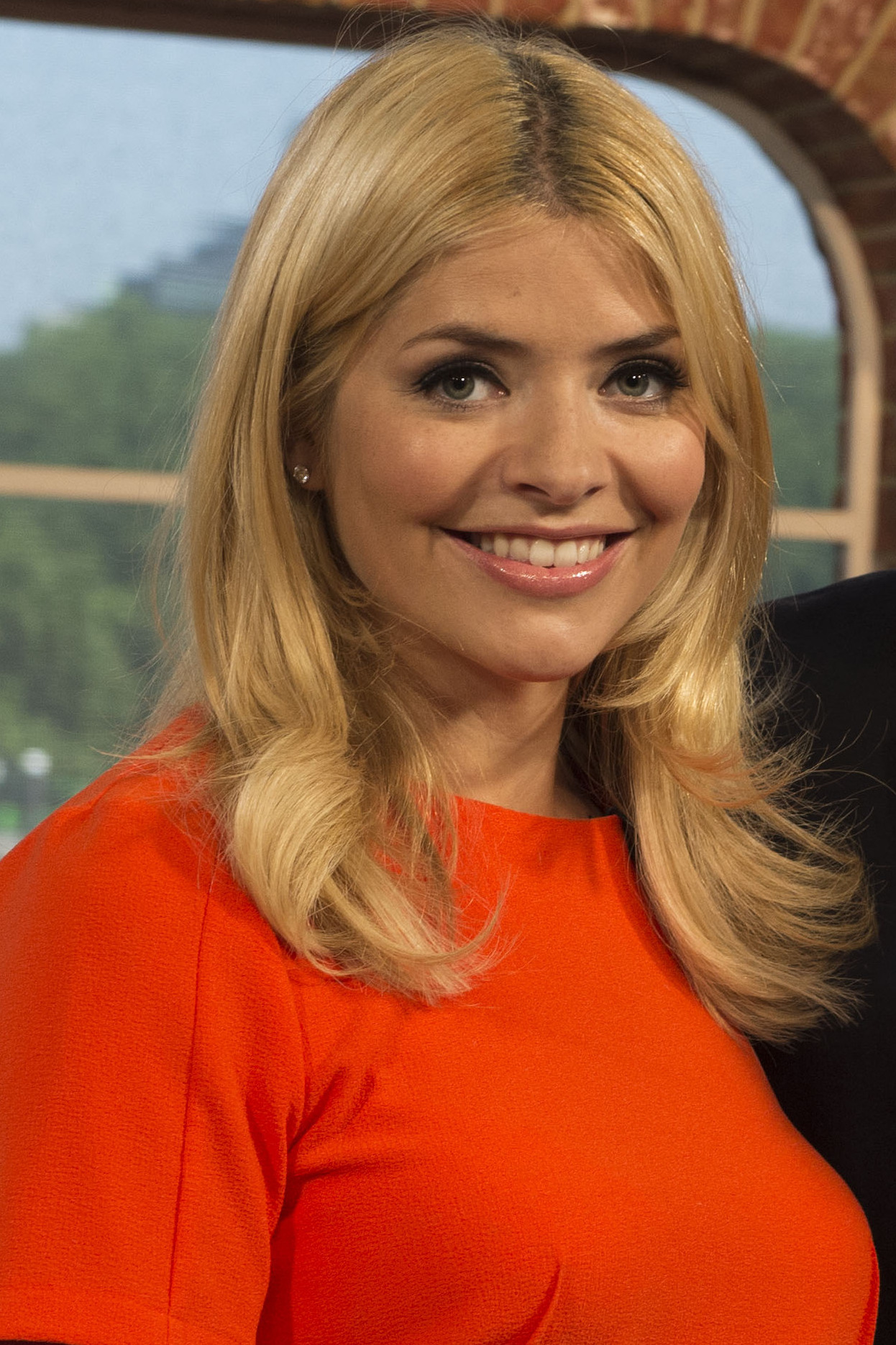
Holly Willoughby (host)

Huge speculation began when the BBC announced that there would be four coaches on the panel of The Voice. It was said that Kylie Minogue was due to become a coach on the show, but it would have cost the TV station too much to get her on the panel. Her sister, Dannii Minogue was also confirmed to be in the running after she left the panel of The X Factor. Mark Owen and Lenny Kravitz were strong candidates for the role. Frankie Sandford of The Saturdays was also confirmed to be in the running. The show's producers were impressed with Cee Lo Green's performance on the American TV series version and wanted him on the British version, but he turned the chance down. Dannii Minogue's former work mate, Cheryl Cole was also said to be a candidate. However, Cole and Minogue were both ruled out after producers said they wanted to "start fresh" and not have The X Factor left overs. However, though Cole and Minogue were ruled out the BBC were keen to show enthusiasm about Charlotte Church, Robbie Williams and Jessie J was also announced to be in with a chance. Tom Jones was offered a role, and later accepted the offer. It was revealed that Sandford was on the verge of signing a contract to become a coach. George Michael and Mary J. Blige were also being considered, with Blige saying on Alan Carr: Chatty Man she has had meetings about her future on the show, she spoke "I have been approached and we have been in discussions about The Voice. I'm not sure if I'm doing it right now. We'll have to wait and see. " will.i.am was confirmed to be close to signing a contract with the show's producers. It was said that Sandford was awaiting to finalise her contract, but she pulled out because of her "busy schedule".

Controversy arose after Danny O'Donoghue was announced as a coach, being picked over Will Young. Young put on his Twitter account, "The Voice came, the Voice went. They wanted to go more rock... Should have dusted off my Leather jacket! Hey ho, (sic)" he said, before adding: "Hang on... Just got Jimmy Page on the line. I'm commiserating him." A tweet the previous night may have also been connected to the loss of role saying, "Words escape me. Life is sometimes a bitch".

Former The X Factor contestants Shayne Ward and Stacey Solomon were both in the running to be hosts. The One Show presenter Alex Jones was also a possibility. Despite Dermot O'Leary signing a three-year contract with The X Factor, The Voice producers were eager to have him present the show. However, former, The Xtra Factor and This Morning host, Holly Willoughby was confirmed to be a candidate after she left as the host on Dancing on Ice. It was later confirmed that Willoughby and BBC Radio presenter, Reggie Yates would be the presenters.

== Teams ==
Key

- Winner
- Runners-up
- Fourth Place
- Eliminated in the Live shows
- Eliminated in the Battle rounds

Coaches	Top 40 Artists				
will.i.am					
will.i.am	Tyler James	Jaz Ellington	Frances Wood	Joelle Moses	Sophie Griffin
will.i.am	Heshima Thompson	Jay Norton	Kate Read	Jenny Jones	J Marie Cooper
Jessie J					
Jessie J	Vince Kidd	Becky Hill	Toni Warne	Cassius Henry	Ruth-Ann St. Luce
Jessie J	Jessica Hammond	Indie & Pixie	Kirsten Joy	David Faulkner	Ben Kelly
Sir Tom Jones					
Sir Tom Jones	Leanne Mitchell	Ruth Brown	Matt & Sueleen	Adam Isaac	Sam Buttery
Sir Tom Jones	Barbara Bryceland	Deniece Pearson	Lindsey Butler	Denise Morgan	Aundrea Nyle
Danny O'Donoghue					
Danny O'Donoghue	Bo Bruce	Max Milner	David Julien	Aleks Josh	Hannah Berney
Danny O'Donoghue	Vince Freeman	Bill Downs	John James Newman	Emmy J Mac	Murray Hockridge

== Blind auditions ==
The blind auditions began in London on 18 January 2012 at the BBC Television Centre and finished filming on 22 January 2012. Each coach has the length of the artists' performance to decide if they want that artist on their team. Should two or more coaches want the same artist, then the artist gets to choose their coach. Once the coaches have picked their team, they are to pit them against each other in the ultimate sing off; the battles.

Colour key
✔	Coach hit their "I WANT YOU" button
	Artist defaulted to this coach's team
	Artist chose to join this coach's team
	Artist eliminated with no coach pressing their "I WANT YOU" button
	Artist had all four chairs turned

=== Episode 1 (24 March) ===
The first blind audition episode was broadcast on 24 March 2012.

Group performance: The Voice UK Coaches – "I Gotta Feeling"

Order	Artist	Age	Song	Coaches and artists choices			
Order	Artist	Age	Song	will.i.am	Jessie	Tom	Danny
1	Jessica Hammond	17	"Price Tag"	✔	✔	✔	✔
2	Sean Conlon	30	"Trouble"	—	—	—	—
3	Sam Buttery	20	"Set Fire to the Rain"	—	—	✔	—
4	Toni Warne	34	"Leave Right Now"	—	✔	✔	✔
5	Aundrea Nyle	36	"Crazy"	—	—	✔	—
6	Adam Isaac	28	"Maybe Tomorrow"	✔	—	✔	—
7	Max Milner	20	"Come Together"/"Lose Yourself"	✔	✔	—	✔
8	Ben Kelly	22	"Rocket Man"	✔	✔	✔	✔
9	Twinnie-Lee Moore	24	"The Climb"	—	—	—	—
10	Phil Poole	27	"Drops of Jupiter (Tell Me)"	—	—	—	—
11	J Marie Cooper	27	"Mamma Knows Best"	✔	✔	✔	✔

=== Episode 2 (31 March) ===
The second blind audition episode was broadcast on 31 March 2012.

Order	Artist	Age	Song	Coaches and artists choices			
Order	Artist	Age	Song	will.i.am	Jessie	Tom	Danny
1	Heshima Thompson	25	"Dynamite"	✔	✔	✔	✔
2	Barbara Bryceland	49	"Wild Horses"	—	—	✔	—
3	David Julien	23	"The Man Who Can't Be Moved"	✔	—	—	✔
4	Kerry Ellis	31	"Son of a Preacher Man"	—	—	—	—
5	Vince Kidd	22	"Like a Virgin"	✔	✔	✔	✔
6	Shansel Huseyin	17	"Nessun dorma"	—	—	—	—
7	Ross Wild	N/A	"Good Riddance (Time of Your Life)"	—	—	—	—
8	Sam Thornton	N/A	"Why Do Fools Fall in Love"	—	—	—	—
9	Siobhan Stott	N/A	"Hallelujah"	—	—	—	—
10	Vince Freeman	34	"Sex on Fire"	—	—	—	✔
11	Aleks Josh	17	"I'm Yours"	✔	—	—	✔
12	Frances Wood	18	"Where Is the Love?"	✔	—	—	—
13	Matt & Sueleen	34 & 34	"A Little Time"	—	✔	✔	—
14	Holly Cosgrove	16	"You Need Me, I Don't Need You"	—	—	—	—
15	Deniece Pearson	43	"Fighter"	—	—	✔	—
16	David Faulkner	29	"Superstition"	✔	✔	✔	✔

=== Episode 3 (7 April) ===
The third blind audition episode was broadcast on 7 April 2012.

Order	Artist	Age	Song	Coaches and artists choices			
Order	Artist	Age	Song	will.i.am	Jessie	Tom	Danny
1	Joelle Moses	21	"Rolling in the Deep"	✔	✔	✔	✔
2	Jay Norton	24	"I Need a Dollar"	✔	—	✔	—
3	Allyson Brown	29	"Somebody Else's Guy"	—	—	—	—
4	Leanne Mitchell	28	"If I Were a Boy"	—	—	✔	✔
5	Cassius Henry	32	"Closer"	—	✔	—	✔
6	Denise Morgan	31	"Love Song"	—	—	✔	—
7	Murray Hockridge	47	"You Give Me Something"	—	—	—	✔
8	Hannah Berney	20	"You and I"	—	—	✔	✔
9	Cris Grixti	31	"Forget You"	—	—	—	—
10	Bill Downs	23	"She Said"	—	—	—	✔
11	Kate Read	19	"True Colors"	✔	—	✔	—
12	Kirsten Joy	25	"Heaven"	—	✔	—	—
13	Ruth-Ann St. Luce	18	"Run"	—	✔	—	—
14	Alys Williams	24	"Someone like You"	—	—	—	—
15	Nathan James	23	"Livin' on a Prayer"	—	—	—	—
16	Tyler James	27	"(Sittin' On) The Dock of the Bay"	✔	—	—	—
17	Bo Bruce	28	"Without You"	✔	—	—	✔

=== Episode 4 (14 April) ===
The fourth and final blind audition episode was broadcast on 14 April 2012.

Order	Artist	Age	Song	Coaches and artists choices			
Order	Artist	Age	Song	will.i.am	Jessie	Tom	Danny
1	Emmy J Mac	21	"Put Your Records On"	✔	—	✔	✔
2	Jenny Jones	25	"Mercy"	✔	—	—	✔
3	Sophie Griffin	17	"American Boy"	✔	—	—	—
4	Ben Lake	33	"I (Who Have Nothing)"	—	—	—	—
5	Indie & Pixie	17 & 18	"Perfect"	✔	✔	✔	✔
6	Lindsey Butler	41	"I Don't Want to Talk About It"	—	—	✔	—
7	Harriet Whitehead	17	"What's Up?"	—	—	—	—
8	John James Newman	33	"Pack Up"/"Don't Worry, Be Happy"	—	—	✔	✔
9	Ruth Brown	19	"When Love Takes Over"	—	—	✔	—N/a
10	Becky Hill	18	"Ordinary People"	✔	✔	—N/a	—N/a
11	Chloe Blackwell	21	"This Love"	—	—N/a	—N/a	—N/a
12	Daniel Walker	35	"Kiss from a Rose"	—	—N/a	—N/a	—N/a
13	Jaz Ellington^{1}	27	"The A Team"	✔	—N/a	—N/a	—N/a

Notes

1. The artist Jaz Ellington was requested, by coach Jessie J, to sing a second track; despite having already joined coach will.i.am's team. Ellington selected "Ordinary People" by John Legend, having already performed "The A Team" by Ed Sheeran.

== Battle rounds ==
The recording of the battle rounds took place on 22 and 23 February 2012 at The Fountain Studios in Wembley with five artists from each team progressing to the live shows. Each coach pitted two of their ten artists together as they performed a song of the coach's choice at the same time in a boxing ring-styled stage. After the two artists completed the song, one progressed to the live shows and one was eliminated from the competition. Once the coaches had completed this process, they each had five artists for the live shows.

The battle advisors for these episodes were: Paloma Faith working with Danny O'Donoghue, Cerys Matthews of Catatonia working with Tom Jones, Ana Matronic of Scissor Sisters working with Jessie J, and Dante Santiago working with will.i.am.

The battle round episodes aired on the 21 and 22 April 2012, in a special "battles weekend" (as the blind auditions were only shown on Saturdays).

Colour key

Artist won the Battle and advanced to the Live shows
Artist lost the Battle and was eliminated

Episode	Coach	Order	Winner	Song	Loser
Episode 1 (21 April 2012)	will.i.am	1	Joelle Moses	"I'm Every Woman"	Jenny Jones
Episode 1 (21 April 2012)	Danny O'Donoghue	2	Max Milner	"Beggin'"	Bill Downs
Episode 1 (21 April 2012)	Tom Jones	3	Sam Buttery	"A Little Less Conversation"	Aundrea Nyle
Episode 1 (21 April 2012)	Jessie J	4	Toni Warne	"Think"	Kirsten Joy
Episode 1 (21 April 2012)	Danny O'Donoghue	5	Bo Bruce	"With or Without You"	Vince Freeman
Episode 1 (21 April 2012)	will.i.am	6	Tyler James	"Yeah 3x"	Heshima Thompson
Episode 1 (21 April 2012)	Jessie J	7	Vince Kidd	"We Found Love"	Jessica Hammond
Episode 1 (21 April 2012)	will.i.am	8	Jaz Ellington	"I Heard It Through the Grapevine"	Jay Norton
Episode 1 (21 April 2012)	Tom Jones	9	Ruth Brown	"No One"	Deniece Pearson
Episode 2 (22 April 2012)	Jessie J	1	Cassius Henry	"Beat It"	David Faulkner
Episode 2 (22 April 2012)	Tom Jones	2	Leanne Mitchell	"The Edge of Glory"	Barbara Bryceland
Episode 2 (22 April 2012)	will.i.am	3	Frances Wood	"Ironic"	Kate Read
Episode 2 (22 April 2012)	Danny O'Donoghue	4	Aleks Josh	"Broken Strings"	Emmy J Mac
Episode 2 (22 April 2012)	Jessie J	5	Ruth-Ann St. Luce	"I Wanna Dance with Somebody"	Ben Kelly
Episode 2 (22 April 2012)	Tom Jones	6	Matt & Sueleen	"Born to Run"	Lindsey Butler
Episode 2 (22 April 2012)	Danny O'Donoghue	7	Hannah Berney	"Kids"	Murray Hockridge
Episode 2 (22 April 2012)	Jessie J	8	Becky Hill	"Irreplaceable"	Indie & Pixie
Episode 2 (22 April 2012)	Tom Jones	9	Adam Isaac	"Use Somebody"	Denise Morgan
Episode 2 (22 April 2012)	will.i.am	10	Sophie Griffin	"Firework"	J Marie Cooper
Episode 2 (22 April 2012)	Danny O'Donoghue	11	David Julien	"Dakota"	John James Newman

== Live shows ==
The live performance shows are aired live from Elstree Studios and will run for six consecutive weeks, ending on 2 June 2012. The first results show on 29 April featured a performance from American singer-songwriter Lana Del Rey with British singer-songwriter Emeli Sandé performing during the second results show on 6 May 2012. American group Scissor Sisters performed during the third result show on 13 May 2012 with The Voice UK Battle Round Adviser Paloma Faith performing during the fourth results show on 20 May 2012. Cheryl and Kylie Minogue performed during the fifth live show It was confirmed on 18 May 2012 that the final on 2 June 2012 would feature performances from Ed Sheeran and Maroon 5.

=== Results summary ===
Team’s Colour Key
Team Will
Team Jessie
Team Tom
Team Danny

Result's colour key

–	Contestant was in the bottom two or three
–	Contestant was eliminated
–	Contestant who received the most public votes
–	Contestant did not perform on that particular week

Weekly results per contestant
Contestant	Week 1	Week 2	Week 3	Week 4	Week 5	Week 6	
Contestant	Week 1	Week 2	Week 3	Week 4	Week 5	Round 1	Round 2
Leanne Mitchell	Safe		Bottom three		Safe	Safe	Winner (week 6)
Bo Bruce		Safe		Safe	Safe	Safe	Runner-up (week 6)
Tyler James	Safe		Bottom three		Safe	Safe	Runner-up (week 6)
Vince Kidd		Safe		Safe	Safe	4th	Eliminated (week 6)
Becky Hill		Safe		Bottom three	Eliminated	Eliminated (week 5)	
Jaz Ellington	Safe		Safe		Eliminated	Eliminated (week 5)	
Max Milner		Bottom two		Bottom three	Eliminated	Eliminated (week 5)	
Ruth Brown	Safe		Safe		Eliminated	Eliminated (week 5)	
Aleks Josh		Safe		Eliminated	Eliminated (week 4)		
Cassius Henry		Safe		Eliminated	Eliminated (week 4)		
David Julien		Safe		Eliminated	Eliminated (week 4)		
Toni Warne		Bottom two		Eliminated	Eliminated (week 4)		
Adam Isaac	Safe		Eliminated	Eliminated (week 3)			
Frances Wood	Safe		Eliminated	Eliminated (week 3)			
Joelle Moses	Bottom two		Eliminated	Eliminated (week 3)			
Matt & Sueleen	Bottom two		Eliminated	Eliminated (week 3)			
Hannah Berney		Eliminated	Eliminated (week 2)				
Ruth-Ann St. Luce		Eliminated	Eliminated (week 2)				
Sam Buttery	Eliminated	Eliminated (week 1)					
Sophie Griffin	Eliminated	Eliminated (week 1)					

=== Live show details ===
==== Week 1 (28 & 29 April) ====
The first live show aired on 28 April 2012 – with Team Tom and Team will.i.am performing.

- Group performance(s): The Voice UK Coaches – "Beautiful Day"; Team Jessie and Team Danny – "You Get What You Give" / "Don't Stop the Music"
- Musical guest: Lana Del Rey ("Blue Jeans")

Artist	Order	Song	Coach	Result
Joelle Moses	1	"I'm Goin' Down"	will.i.am	Bottom two
Sam Buttery	2	"A Little Respect"	Tom Jones	Eliminated
Frances Wood	3	"Ain't Nobody"	will.i.am	Safe
Adam Isaac	4	"All My Life"	Tom Jones	Safe
Jaz Ellington	5	"At Last"	will.i.am	Safe
Leanne Mitchell	6	"Who Knew"	Tom Jones	Safe
Sophie Griffin	7	"Titanium"	will.i.am	Eliminated
Matt & Sueleen	8	"Go Your Own Way"	Tom Jones	Bottom two
Tyler James	9	"Higher Love"	will.i.am	Safe
Ruth Brown	10	"Get Here"	Tom Jones	Safe

==== Week 2 (5 & 6 May) ====
The second live show aired on 5 May 2012 – with Team Jessie and Team Danny performing.

- Group performance(s): Team will.i.am – "Higher"; Team Tom – "Higher Ground"
- Musical guest: Emeli Sandé ("My Kind of Love")

Artist	Order	Song	Coach	Result
Toni Warne	1	"Proud Mary"	Jessie J	Bottom two
Max Milner	2	"Free Fallin"	Danny O'Donoghue	Bottom two
Ruth-Ann St. Luce	3	"Promise This"	Jessie J	Eliminated
Hannah Berney	4	"Cry Me a River"/"Cry Me a River"	Danny O'Donoghue	Eliminated
Vince Kidd	5	"Always on My Mind"	Jessie J	Safe
Aleks Josh	6	"Dream a Little Dream of Me"	Danny O'Donoghue	Safe
Cassius Henry	7	"Paradise"	Jessie J	Safe
David Julien	8	"Sweet Disposition"	Danny O'Donoghue	Safe
Becky Hill	9	"Good Luck"	Jessie J	Safe
Bo Bruce	10	"Running Up that Hill"	Danny O'Donoghue	Safe

==== Week 3 (12 & 13 May) ====
The third live show aired on Saturday 12 May 2012 – with Team Tom and Team will.i.am performing. Both judges had to eliminate two of their artists, leaving them with two each for the semi-final shows.

- Group performance(s): Team Tom with Tom Jones – "Hit the Road Jack"; Team will.i.am with will.i.am – "Gold Digger" / "Just Can't Get Enough"; Team Jessie – "Canned Heat"; Team Danny – "Starlight"
- Musical guest: Scissor Sisters ("Only the Horses")

Artist	Order	Song	Coach	Result
Leanne Mitchell	1	"I Put a Spell on You"	Tom Jones	Bottom three
Frances Wood	2	"Show Me Love"	will.i.am	Eliminated
Matt & Sueleen	3	"Missing"	Tom Jones	Eliminated
Joelle Moses	4	"Stronger (What Doesn't Kill You)"	will.i.am	Eliminated
Ruth Brown	5	"Next to Me"	Tom Jones	Safe
Tyler James	6	"Sign Your Name"	will.i.am	Bottom three
Adam Isaac	7	"High and Dry"	Tom Jones	Eliminated
Jaz Ellington	8	"Just the Way You Are"/"Just the Way You Are"	will.i.am	Safe

==== Week 4 (19 & 20 May) ====
The fourth live show was on Saturday 19 May 2012 – with Team Danny and Team Jessie performing. Both judges had to eliminate two of their artists, leaving them with two each for the semi-final shows.

- Group performance(s): Team Jessie with Jessie J – "We Are Young"; Team Danny with Danny O'Donoghue – "Somebody That I Used To Know"; Team Tom – "Shake It Out"; Team will.i.am – "Roxanne"
- Musical guest: Paloma Faith ("Picking Up the Pieces")

Artist	Order	Song	Coach	Result
Max Milner	1	"Black Horse and the Cherry Tree"	Danny O'Donoghue	Bottom three
Cassius Henry	2	"Turning Tables"	Jessie J	Eliminated
Bo Bruce	3	"Love the Way You Lie (Part II)"	Danny O'Donoghue	Safe
Vince Kidd	4	"My Love Is Your Love"	Jessie J	Safe
Aleks Josh	5	"Better Together"	Danny O'Donoghue	Eliminated
Becky Hill	6	"Seven Nation Army"	Jessie J	Bottom three
David Julien	7	"She Will Be Loved"	Danny O'Donoghue	Eliminated
Toni Warne	8	"Sorry Seems to Be the Hardest Word"	Jessie J	Eliminated

==== Week 5: Semi-final (26 & 27 May) ====
The fifth live show aired on 26 May 2012, with all teams performing. The public then chose one artist from each team to advance to the final. For the first time in the series, Cheryl's performance was live on Saturday's show, but Kylie's performance was broadcast on Sunday's results show. It was also the first time there were two special musical guests.

- Group performance(s): The Voice UK Final 8 – "You're the Voice"
- Musical guests: Cheryl ("Call My Name"), Kylie Minogue ("Timebomb")

Artist	Order	Song	Coach	Result
Ruth Brown	1	"The Voice Within"	Tom Jones	Eliminated
Vince Kidd	2	"Back to Black"	Jessie J	Safe
Max Milner	3	"Every Breath You Take"	Danny O'Donoghue	Eliminated
Jaz Ellington	4	"Let It Be"	will.i.am	Eliminated
Leanne Mitchell	5	"Run to You"	Tom Jones	Safe
Becky Hill	6	"Like a Star"	Jessie J	Eliminated
Bo Bruce	7	"Charlie Brown"	Danny O'Donoghue	Safe
Tyler James	8	"Bohemian Rhapsody"	will.i.am	Safe

==== Week 6: Final (2 June) ====
The final live show aired on 2 June 2012. Each coach had one artist each in their team, and for the first time in the series, each artist performed three songs: a solo number, a duet with their coach and their favourite song of the series.

- Group performance(s): The Voice UK Coaches – Medley of "It's Not Unusual" / "Breakeven" / "Price Tag" / "Where Is the Love?"
- Musical guests: Ed Sheeran ("Small Bump"), Maroon 5 ("Payphone", "Moves Like Jagger")

Order	Coach	Artist	First song	Second song (duet)	Third song	Result
1	Danny O'Donoghue	Bo Bruce	"Nothing Compares 2 U"	"Read All About It" (with Danny O'Donoghue)	"Charlie Brown"	Runner-up
2	Tom Jones	Leanne Mitchell	"It's a Man's Man's Man's World"	"Mama Told Me Not to Come" (with Tom Jones)	"Run to You"	Winner
3	will.i.am	Tyler James	"I'll Be There"	"OMG" (with will.i.am)	"Higher Love"	Runner-up
4	Jessie J	Vince Kidd	"Many Rivers to Cross"	"Nobody's Perfect" (with Jessie J)	N/A (already eliminated)	Eliminated

== Reception ==
=== Ratings ===
Episode	Date	Official ratings (in millions)	Weekly rank	Share	Source
Blind auditions 1	24 March	9.44	3	37.6%	
Blind auditions 2	31 March	9.93	1	39.3%	
Blind auditions 3	7 April	10.71	1	41.1%	
Blind auditions 4	14 April	11.99	1	45.5%	
Battle rounds 1	21 April	11.24	1	42.3%	
Battle rounds 2	22 April	10.98	2	38.5%	
Live show 1	28 April	10.51	1	41.8%	
Results 1	29 April	9.17	2	35.1%	
Live show 2	5 May	9.36	1	35.6%	
Results 2	6 May	7.24	6	30.3%	
Live show 3	12 May	6.54	3	29.4%	
Results 3	13 May	6.75	4	26.4%	
Live show 4	19 May	6.79	6	27.9%	
Results 4	20 May	6.28	8	26.2%	
Live show 5	26 May	5.25	8	28.8%	
Results 5	27 May	5.14	9	26.5%	
Live final	2 June	7.82	4	34.2%	
Series average	2012	8.54	4	34.5%	

== Controversies ==
BBC Radio 2's Paul Gambaccini told the Radio Times that The Voice UK is "karaoke", and Mark Goodier questioned the motives of Universal Music saying, "Universal have to be doing this because they want market share." On whether The Voice is to become a "huge hit" in the UK, he added, "It really depends on whether they find a star or not."

During her performance in the fourth live show, Becky Hill forgot her words and said an explicit word. Willoughby apologized after the performance. An edited version to the performance was posted on BBC iPlayer and YouTube.
