= Aleksandar Mileusnić =

British singer

Aleksandar Mileusnić also known as Aleks Josh, is a singer originating from Stevenage, England of Serbian origin, with his father coming from Serbia. As Aleks Josh, he took part in The Voice UK in its first series in March–May 2012. In 2018, he returned auditioning for Britain's Got Talent, using his real name.

== The Voice UK ==
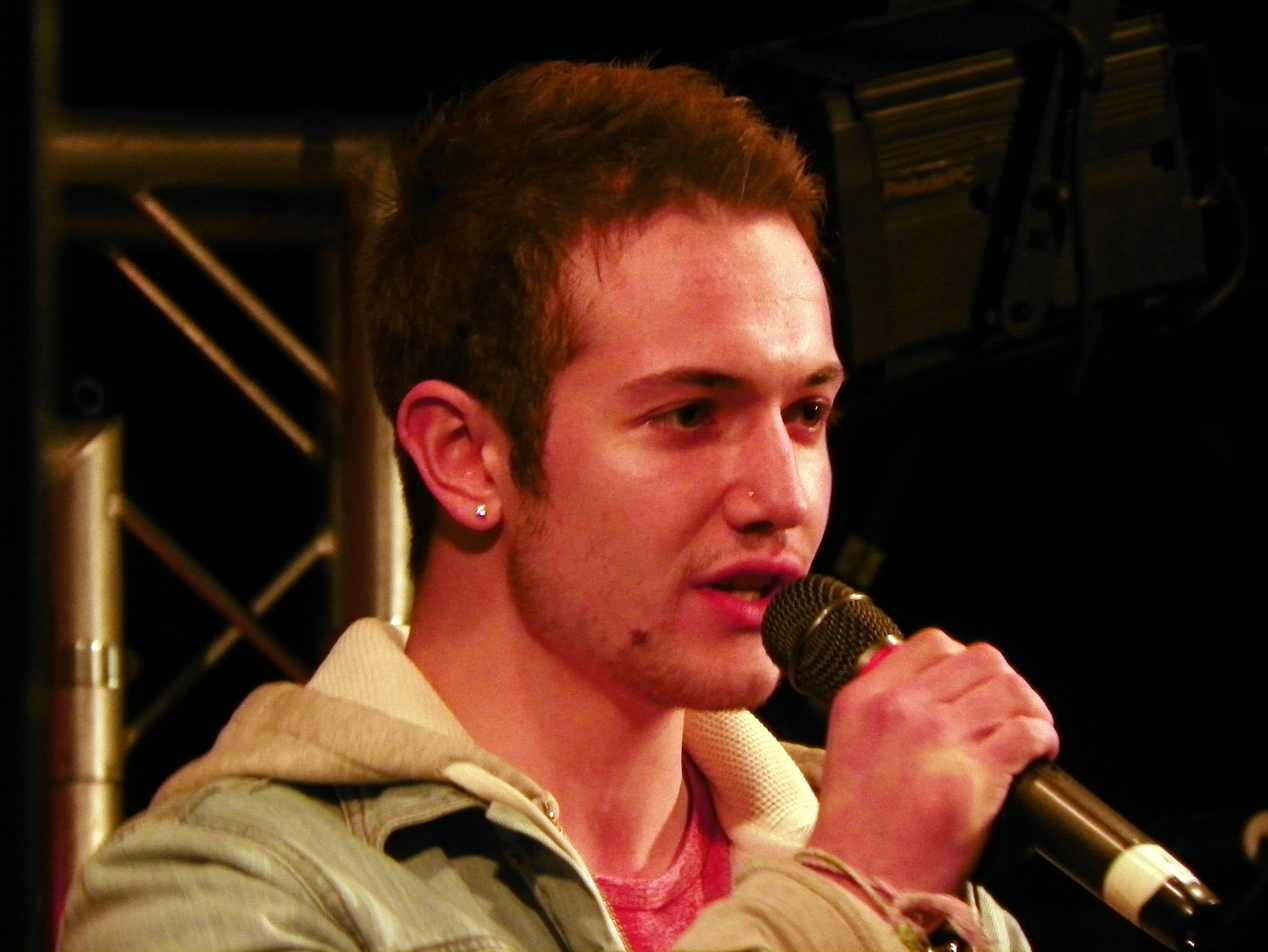
Aleks Josh in 2012

At age seventeen, and as Aleks Josh, he appeared on the second of four The Voice audition shows broadcast on BBC One. For the show. In his audition broadcast on 31 March 2012 he sang "I'm Yours" from Jason Mraz. Two coaches, Danny O'Donoghue and will.i.am turned their chair, whereas judges Tom Jones and Jessie J refrained. Josh ended up selecting O'Donoghue for his team. During the battle rounds, Josh sang "Broken Strings" by James Morrison and Nelly Furtado against twenty-one-year-old Emmy J Mac from his own team with Danny crowning him the winner. In the second live show, Josh performed "Dream a Little Dream of Me" proceeding to the next round with the public vote. In the fourth live show, Josh performed "Better Together" from Jack Johnson—finding himself in the bottom three alongside David Julien and Max Milner; from which he was eliminated from the competition finishing sixth overall for the show.

== After The Voice ==
After the show, Aleks released a single entitled "Cruise" accompanied by a music video followed by an EP. He also supported both Olly Murs and The Wanted in summer of 2012.

In 2014, he was approached by Talpa Media and 8 Ball Music record label to be part of an international pop rock band based in Amsterdam, The Netherlands, later partnering with Sony Music Netherlands. In this time the band was picked by Dutch John de Mol Jr. to appear on Dutch television with further performances and radio coverage across the country. He also wrote songs for a number of UK and Dutch artists. He plays guitar and has been vocally trained by Sonia Jones, Yvie Burnett, Martin Mol and Anni Williams.

== Britain's Got Talent ==
In 2018 he auditioned for Britain's Got Talent aired on ITV in the programme's twelfth series. Using his real name, he introduced himself as a 23-years old council worker for Hertfordshire Council and also introduced his wife who was pregnant with his first child, a boy. On the BGT episode broadcast on 5 April 2018, he sang "Seven Nation Army" from The White Stripes giving it a swagging rhythm earning standing ovation from the public and all four judges Simon Cowell, Amanda Holden, Alesha Dixon and David Walliams for mixing swing, jazz and big band music, in original arrangements of known songs. Cowell added that "I actually feel like I'm witnessing a star being born". On 30 May he returned to the show in the third semi-finals accompanied by a jazz band singing "No Diggity" an original from Blackstreet featuring Dr. Dre and Queen Pen with all four judges giving it a second standing ovation. But he was eliminated from the show coming fourth in eight contestants.
