= Cassius Henry =

English singer

- Born: 28 June 1979 (age 46)
- Origin: London

Cassius Henry (born 28 June 1979) is a singer from London. He had two record deals; firstly with Edel in 2002, which spawned the #31 hit Broke, and secondly in 2004 with MCA, which spawned a #56 hit with The One, which featured Freeway.

Henry auditioned for The Voice UK at age thirty-two with "Closer", originally by Ne-Yo, appearing on the third of four audition shows. Two coaches, Jessie J and Danny O'Donoghue elected for Henry to join their teams—with Henry selecting Jessie J. During the battle rounds, Henry sung "Beat It", originally by Michael Jackson, against twenty-nine-year-old David Faulkner—with Jessie crowning him the winner. In the second live show, Henry performed "Paradise" by Coldplay—proceeding to the next show as a result of the public vote. In the fourth live show, Henry performed Adele's "Turning Tables"—finding himself in the bottom three alongside Toni Warne and Becky Hill; from which he was eliminated from the competition.
