= Leah McFall =

British singer and songwriter (born 1989)

- Born: 1 July 1989 (age 35); Newtownabbey, Northern Ireland
- Genres: R&B; pop
- Occupation: Singer-songwriter
- Instruments: Vocals; piano
- Years active: 2010–present
- Labels: Capitol

Leah McFall (born 1 July 1989) is a British singer-songwriter from Newtownabbey, Northern Ireland. She finished as the runner-up on the second series of the BBC One talent series The Voice.

== Early life ==
McFall began her singing career at her local church, Glenabbey, at the age of six. She was a pupil at Antrim Grammar School. During her childhood she listened to Motown, jazz, gospel, folk and pop music which was played around the family home, and influences both her vocal and song writing style. After years of gigging around Northern Ireland, Leah moved to London to attend college. After six months there, she began playing at the Ronnie Scott's Jazz Club.

== Career ==
=== 2013: The Voice UK ===
In 2013, McFall auditioned for the second series of The Voice, where she chose to join Will's team. In the battle round, she sang against CJ Edwards. The pair duetted on the Michael Jackson song "The Way You Make Me Feel", and McFall was chosen to proceed. In the Knockout round, will.i.am gave his Fast Pass to McFall and she performed Minnie Riperton's "Lovin' You". In the first live show, McFall sang "I Will Survive" by Gloria Gaynor. The studio version of her performance charted at number 16 on the UK Singles Chart, selling 19,213 copies within a week. A week later, it rose to number 8. McFall then performed the Fugees' version of "Killing Me Softly" in the semi-final on 15 June 2013. The result was revealed that McFall had received the most public votes, and would therefore represent Team Will in the final.

==== Performances ====
Performed	Song	Original Artist	Result
Blind Audition	"R.I.P"	Rita Ora	Joined Team Will
Battle Rounds	"The Way You Make Me Feel" (against CJ Edwards)	Michael Jackson	Winner
Knockout rounds	"Lovin' You"	Minnie Riperton	Fast pass
Quarter-final	"I Will Survive"	Gloria Gaynor	Fast pass
Semi-final	"Rapture" (as part of Team Will)	Blondie	Safe
Semi-final	"Killing Me Softly"	Roberta Flack	Safe
Semi-final	"I Will Wait" (as part of The Voice UK Semi-finalists)	Mumford & Sons	Safe
Final	"I Will Always Love You"	Dolly Parton	Safe
Final	"Bang Bang" (mentor duet with will.i.am)	will.i.am	Safe
Final	"Lovin' You" (as favourite performance)	Minnie Riperton	Runner-up

=== 2013–present: Weird to Wonderful and independent releases ===
In July 2013, Will.i.am revealed that he would release a new version of his single "Bang Bang" featuring McFall. On 14 July 2013, McFall made her debut performance at the Wireless Festival alongside her mentor will.i.am. During the tour, McFall revealed she would release three music videos before her first official single and album are released. The first of these videos, "No Ordinary Love", was released on 1 February 2014. On 6 June, McFall announced the title of her first official single, "Home" featuring will.i.am. The single was released on 27 July 2014. On 21 July 2014, McFall announced her debut album, titled Weird to Wonderful, was due to be released in October 2014, but was cancelled, and she was dropped from her record label. McFall returned in September 2016 with "Wolf Den", released independently. This was followed by the release of single "Happy Human", and the release of her EP, INK. The release of the EP was preceded by the "INK Tour", which saw McFall perform at dates around the UK and Ireland. Since INK, McFall has released three singles; "Somber", "White X" and "Marriage".

== Discography ==
=== Studio albums ===
Album title	Album details	Peak chart positions
Album title	Album details	UK
Weird to Wonderful	Unreleased; Label: Capitol Records; Formats: CD, Digital Download	N/A

=== Extended plays ===
Title	Details
Frills and Fur	Release date: 21 November 2010; Label: Independent; Formats: digital download
Ink	Release date: 27 March 2017; Label: Independent; Formats: digital download

=== Singles ===
==== As lead artist ====
Title	Year	Peak chart positions		Album
Title	Year	UK	SCO	Album
"Home" (featuring will.i.am)	2014	56	47	Non-album single
"Wolf Den"	2016	—	—	Ink
"Happy Human"	2017	—	—	Ink
"Somber"	2018	—	—	TBA
"White X"	2018	—	—	TBA
"Marriage"	2019	—	—	TBA
"—" denotes items which were not released in that country or failed to chart.

==== Promotional singles ====
Title	Year	Peak chart positions			Album
Title	Year	UK	IRE	SCO	Album
"I Will Survive"	2013	8	39	13	Non-album singles
"Killing Me Softly"	2013	36	—	53	Non-album singles
"I Will Always Love You"	2013	43	—	48	Non-album singles
"—" denotes items which were not released in that country or failed to chart.

==== Guest appearances ====
Single	Year	Album
"Bang Bang" (will.i.am featuring Leah McFall)	2013	Now That's What I Call Music! 86
"Spiritual Warfare" (Ghetts featuring Leah McFall & Jordy)	2018	Ghetto Gospel: The New Testament

=== Music videos ===
Title	Year	Director(s)
"No Ordinary Love"	2014	noMSG
"Home"	2014	Elisha Smith-Leverock
"Happy Human"	2017	

== Concert tours ==
Supporting act

- Leon Jackson solo tour (2010) (supporting Leon Jackson)
- #willpower Tour (2013) (supporting will.i.am)
- Forestry Tour (2014) (supporting Jessie J)

Headlining act

- INK tour. (2017)
