= Leanne Mitchell =

English singer

- Born: Leanne Mitchell; 14 December 1983 (age 42); Lowestoft, Suffolk, England
- Genres: Pop
- Occupations: Singer; songwriter
- Years active: 2012–2014
- Label: Decca (2012–2014)

Leanne Mitchell (born 14 December 1983) is an English pop singer, best known for winning the first series of The Voice UK on 2 June 2012. Mitchell released her debut solo single "Run to You" on 3 June 2012.

Her debut self-titled album was released in May 2013 and was described as a "huge flop", managing to get to only 134 in the album chart. She was dropped from her label in 2014.

== Career ==
=== Early career ===
At the age of 15 she started performing at Potters Leisure Resort, near Hopton-on-Sea. Leanne went on to be a regular lead in many Potters Theatre Company productions and was lead vocalist for the Theatre Company before leaving due to her success on 'The Voice' Mitchell writes music, sings, and plays piano and the organ.

=== 2012: The Voice UK ===
Leanne auditioned for the first ever series of The Voice UK with Beyoncé's If I Were A Boy, having made Tom Jones and Danny O'Donoghue turn their chairs for her, but she chose to join Team Tom. In the Battle Rounds, she was paired up with Barbara Bryceland to sing Lady Gaga's The Edge of Glory, which she won, therefore proceeding to the live shows. In Week 1, she performed P!nk's Who Knew and won the public vote, alongside Ruth Brown and Adam Isaac, moving on the next show. In Week 3, she performed I Put A Spell On You, but ended up in the bottom 3 after they lost to Ruth Brown, who won the vote. Tom Jones chose to save Leanne, taking her to the Semi-Finals. In the Semis, she performed Whitney Houston's Run to You and won the public vote against Ruth Brown. In the Live Finals, she first sang It's a Man's Man's Man's World as her solo song, her duet with coach Tom Jones being Mama Told Me Not to Come and her Song of the Series was yet again, Run to You. She was pronounced as the winner and soon released a cover version of Run to You as her debut single.

== Personal life ==
In 2011, she married activity instructor Rob Hurren, whom she had met 10 years earlier at Potters Leisure Resort. The couple live in Oulton Broad, Lowestoft.

=== Performances ===
Performed	Song	Original Artist	Result
Blind Audition	"If I Were a Boy"	Beyoncé	Joined Team Tom
Battle Rounds	"The Edge of Glory" (against Barbara Bryceland)	Lady Gaga	Winner
Week 1	"Who Knew"	Pink	Safe
Week 2	"Higher Ground" (as part of Team Tom) (Note: Mitchell performed "Higher Ground" as part of Team Tom (alongside Ruth Brown, Matt & Sueleen and Adam Issac) during the results of the second live show, though it remained a non-competition performance; with Team Tom not participating that week.)	Stevie Wonder	—N/a
Week 3	"I Put a Spell on You"	Screamin' Jay Hawkins	Safe
Week 4	"Shake It Out" (as part of Team Tom) (Note: Mitchell performed "Shake It Out" as part of Team Tom (alongside Ruth Brown) during the results of the fourth live show, though it remained a non-competition performance; with Team Tom not participating that week.)	Florence and the Machine	—N/a
Semi-final	"Run to You"	Whitney Houston	Safe
Final	"It's a Man's Man's Man's World"	James Brown	Winner
Final	"Mama Told Me Not to Come" (with Tom Jones)	Eric Burdon	Winner
Final	"Run to You"	Whitney Houston	Winner

== Discography ==
=== Studio albums ===
Title	Album details	Peak chart positions
Title	Album details	UK
Leanne Mitchell	Released: 27 May 2013; Label: Decca; Formats: CD, digital download	134

=== Singles ===
Year	Title	Peak chart positions	Album
Year	Title	UK	Album
2012	"Run to You"	45	Non-album single
2013	"If I Knew Then"	—	Leanne Mitchell
2013	"Pride"	—	Leanne Mitchell
"—" denotes single that did not chart or was not released.

=== Guest appearances ===
Year	Song	Album
2012	"Run to You"	The Voice UK, The Final 8 – The Album
2012	"I Put a Spell on You"	The Voice UK, The Final 8 – The Album
