= Exhibit A (TV series) =

English-language docu-series on Netflix

- Genre: Documentary crime
- Created by: Kelly Loudenberg
- Directed by: Kelly Loudenberg
- Country of origin: United States
- Original language: English
- No. of seasons: 1
- No. of episodes: 4

Production
- Running time: 29-41 min.

Original release
- Network: Netflix
- Release: June 28, 2019

Exhibit A is a four-part English-language documentary TV-series that premiered on Netflix on June 28, 2019 created and directed by Kelly Loudenberg. It explores how forensic techniques, tools and evidence such as blood spatter, touch DNA, cadaver dogs and CCTV footage can be misinterpreted and manipulated to have potentially innocent people convicted.

== Release ==
It was released on August 2, 2019 on Netflix streaming.
