= Exhibit A (art exhibition) =

1992 art exhibition

Coordinates: 51.5046°N 0.1750°W

Cover of Exhibit "A" catalogue, designed by the late Tony Arefin showing "sealed evidence" wrapper.

Exhibit A was an art exhibition in the galleries of the Serpentine Gallery, London, from May 7—June 7, 1992.

== Theme and content ==
The eight artists whose work was showcased were selected by curator Henry Bond for their ongoing interest in the exhibition's key theme: art exploring perceptions of evidential fact particularly in the context of the crime scene. The art historian Ian Jeffrey wrote,

It is the opposite, Exhibit A, to a sensational exhibition, and crystallises a turning in the art world away from the egotistical mode towards impersonality. The egotistical, it admits, is a delusion ... its premises are anonymous, fluent, vertiginous, wary of values. Anything else would emerge as a cliché ... it is, in fact, a properly phenomenological exhibition, one which refuses to differentiate between subject and object, between perception and the moments and occasions of perception.

One of the works on view was a slide-installation, shown in a darkened room, by artist Mat Collishaw, which presented the viewer with a rapid-fire sequence of stills of Jodie Foster dancing as she appeared in the "rape scene", in Jonathan Kaplan's 1988 movie The Accused.

== Exhibited artists ==
- Mat Collishaw
- Catherine Yass
- Cesare Pietroiusti
- Dominique Gonzalez-Foerster
- Damien Hirst
- Sam Samore
- Hirsch Perlman
- Cindy Bernard

== Review literature ==
- Sarah Kent, “Exhibit A,” Time Out, London, No. 1135.
- Charles Hall, “Exhibit A,” Arts Review, June 1992.
- Kate Bush, “Exhibit A,” Art Monthly, June 1992, p. 15-16.
