= The Black Eyed Peas Experience =

2011 video game

- North American cover art
- Developers: Ubisoft Quebec (Wii) iNiS (Xbox 360)
- Publisher: Ubisoft
- Engine: Unreal Engine 3 (Xbox 360)
- Platforms: Wii, Xbox 360
- Release: NA: November 8, 2011; AU: November 10, 2011; EU: November 11, 2011
- Genres: Music, rhythm
- Modes: Single-player, multiplayer

The Black Eyed Peas Experience is a music video game based on songs by The Black Eyed Peas. It was developed by Ubisoft Quebec for the Wii and iNiS for the Xbox 360's Kinect, published by Ubisoft and released in November 2011.

== Gameplay ==
=== Wii ===
The Wii version uses very similar style of play to the Just Dance series, in which players dance. The game uses a co-op scoring system. There are two modes of play in this version. The first is "Solo", where all players follow the choreographed routine by an on-screen member of The Black Eyed Peas. The second is "Duo", which is made for videos with two members of the group. Up to two players can dance as one of the two. In both modes, pictograms scroll from side to side (much like Just Dance 2).

=== Kinect ===
The gameplay of the Kinect version is different from the Wii version. This version has two players create their avatar with the Kinect. Once a song is selected, the player is shown a move that all members of The Black Eyed Peas are doing, and the player has to repeat it for a certain amount of time. The player is scored on how well they repeat the move. The process repeats with other moves. The choreography has three sets of three moves, with the last part of each set being a routine of three moves. The player can choose to do a full choreography, where the objective is to get a target amount of fans across two stages with the same choreography to clear the song.

== Soundtrack ==
The game has a main soundtrack of 30 songs, all by the American musical group The Black Eyed Peas.

Song title	Album	Year	Xbox 360	Wii
"The Best One Yet (The Boy)"	The Beginning	2010	Yes	Yes
"Boom Boom Pow"	The E.N.D.	2009	Yes	Yes
"Cali to New York" (feat. De La Soul)	Bridging the Gap	2000	Yes	No
"Disco Club"	Monkey Business	2005	Yes	Yes
"Don't Lie"	Monkey Business	2005	Yes	Yes
"Don't Phunk with My Heart"	Monkey Business	2005	Yes	Yes
"Don't Stop the Party"	The Beginning	2010	Yes	Yes
"Dum Diddly"	Monkey Business	2005	Yes	Yes
"Everything Wonderful" (feat. David Guetta)	The Beginning: Super Deluxe Edition	2010	Yes	Yes
"Fashion Beats"	The Beginning	2010	Yes	Yes
"Hey Mama"	Elephunk	2004	Yes	Yes
"I Gotta Feeling"	The E.N.D.	2009	Yes	Yes
"Imma Be"	The E.N.D.	2009	Yes	Yes
"Just Can't Get Enough"	The Beginning	2010	Yes	Yes
"Let's Get It Started" (Spike Mix)	Elephunk	2004	Yes	Yes
"Light Up the Night"	The Beginning	2010	Not anymore (Previously available as DLC or by entering special edition code)	Yes (only with special edition)
"Love You Long Time"	The Beginning	2010	Yes	No
"Meet Me Halfway"	The E.N.D.	2009	Yes	Yes
"My Humps"	Monkey Business	2005	Yes	Yes
"My Style" (feat. Justin Timberlake)	Monkey Business	2005	Yes	Yes
"Pump It"	Monkey Business	2006	Yes	Yes
"Rock That Body"	The E.N.D.	2010	Yes	Yes
"Shut Up"	Elephunk	2004	Yes	Yes
"Showdown"	The E.N.D.	2009	Yes	No
"The Situation"	The Beginning	2010	Yes	No
"Smells Like Funk"	Elephunk	2004	Yes	No
"Someday"	The Beginning	2010	Not anymore (Previously available as DLC or by entering special edition code)	Yes (only with special edition)
"Take It Off"	The Beginning: Super Deluxe Edition	2010	Yes	Yes
"They Don't Want Music" (feat. James Brown)	Monkey Business	2005	Not anymore (Previously available as DLC)	Yes
"The Time (Dirty Bit)"	The Beginning	2010	Yes	Yes
"Whenever"	The Beginning	2010	Yes	Yes

=== Downloadable content ===
There are 10 songs that were available for purchase on the Xbox Live Marketplace for 240 Microsoft Points each, but are now no longer available to purchase and download. These songs are not available on the Wii.

Song title	Artist	Release date
"Bebot"	The Black Eyed Peas	November 8, 2011
"Where Is the Love?"	The Black Eyed Peas	December 13, 2011
"Nothing Really Matters"	David Guetta feat. will.i.am	December 13, 2011
"Party Rock Anthem"	LMFAO feat. Lauren Bennett and GoonRock	December 13, 2011
"They Don't Want Music"	The Black Eyed Peas feat. James Brown	January 10, 2012
"Do It Like This"	The Black Eyed Peas	January 10, 2012
"Like a G6"	Far East Movement feat. Dev and The Cataracs	March 27, 2012
"Mirrors"	Natalia Kills	April 10, 2012
"Pon de Floor"	Major Lazer	April 10, 2012
"Don't Hold Your Breath"	Nicole Scherzinger	April 10, 2012

== Reception ==
Reception

Aggregate score
Aggregator	Score
Metacritic	(X360) 66/100 (Wii) 39/100

Review scores
Publication	Score
4Players	(X360) 66%
Gamekult	(X360) 6/10
GamesRadar+	(X360) 3/5
IGN	(X360) 6/10
Jeuxvideo.com	(X360) 14/20 (Wii) 12/20
Official Xbox Magazine (UK)	(X360) 6/10
Official Xbox Magazine (US)	(X360) 7.5/10
Common Sense Media	4/5
Digital Spy	(X360) 3/5

The Xbox 360 version received "average" reviews, while the Wii version received unfavorable reviews, according to the review aggregation website Metacritic. Many critics noted that the game was likely to be more enjoyable to fans of the group.
