= The Beginning (tour) =

2011 concert tour by the Black Eyed Peas

The Beginning Massive Stadium Tour
- World tour by The Black Eyed Peas
- Promotional poster for the concert in Madrid
- Location: North America • Asia • Europe • South America
- Associated album: The Beginning
- Start date: June 22, 2011
- End date: November 23, 2011
- Legs: 1
- No. of shows: 1 in Asia; 9 in Europe; 6 in North America; 2 in South America; 18 Total

The Black Eyed Peas concert chronology
- The E.N.D. World Tour (2009–10); The Beginning Massive Stadium Tour (2011); Masters Of The Sun Tour (2018)

The Beginning Massive Stadium Tour was the fourth concert tour by American hip hop group the Black Eyed Peas, in support of the group's sixth studio album The Beginning (2010). It was the last tour to feature Fergie as a member of the group, as well as the last before the group's official hiatus, lasting until 2015.

== Opening acts ==
- David Guetta (Paris and Madrid, 22 June & 14 July)
- Natalia Kills (Paris, 24 & 25 June, Düsseldorf 28 June)
- Stromae (Paris, 24 & 25 June)
- Parade (Cheadle, Staffordshire, 6 July)
- Labrinth (Cheadle, Staffordshire, 6 July)
- LMFAO (Cheadle, Staffordshire, 6 July)
- Tinie Tempah (Düsseldorf, 28 June)
- Diva (Asunción, 15 November)
- Sean Kingston (Miami, 23 November)
- Jason Derulo (Miami, 23 November)
- T-Pain (Miami, 23 November)
- CeeLo Green (Miami, 23 November)
- Queen Latifah (Miami, 23 November)

== Set list ==
1. "Rock That Body"
2. "Meet Me Halfway"
3. "Just Can't Get Enough"
4. "The Best One Yet (The Boy)"
5. "Bebot" (apl.de.ap & Taboo solo)
6. "Don't Phunk with My Heart"
7. "My Humps"
8. "Shut Up"
9. "Don't Stop the Party"
10. "Imma Be"
11. "Joints & Jam"
12. "Glamorous" / "Big Girls Don't Cry" (Fergie solo)
13. "OMG" / "Sweet Dreams (Are Made of This)" / "Smells Like Teen Spirit" / "Gettin' Over You (Sidney Samson Remix)" / "When Love Takes Over (Electro Radio Edit)" / "White Lines (Don't Don't Do It)" / "Thriller" / "Otherside" / "Song 2" / "T.H.E. (The Hardest Ever)" (will.i.am DJ set)
14. "Party Rock Anthem"
15. "Freestyle Break"
16. "Let's Get It Started"
17. "Pump It"
18. "Light Up the Night"
19. "Where Is the Love?"
20. "We Can Be Anything" (apl.de.ap solo)

Encore

21. "Boom Boom Pow"
22. "The Time (Dirty Bit)"
23. "I Gotta Feeling"
Additional Information
- During the performance in London, The Peas were joined onstage by David Guetta to perform "I Gotta Feeling".

== Tour dates ==
Date	City	Country	Venue	Supporting act(s)
Europe
June 22, 2011	Saint-Denis	France	Stade de France	David Guetta
June 24, 2011	Saint-Denis	France	Stade de France	Natalia Kills; Stromae
June 25, 2011	Saint-Denis	France	Stade de France	Natalia Kills; Stromae
June 28, 2011	Düsseldorf	Germany	Esprit Arena	Tinie Tempah; Natalia Kills
July 1, 2011^{[A]}	London	England	Hyde Park	—N/a
July 3, 2011	Werchter	Belgium	Rock Werchter	—N/a
July 6, 2011	Staffordshire	England	Alton Towers Resort	Parade; Labrinth; LMFAO
July 8, 2011^{[B]}	Kildare	Ireland	Punchestown Racecourse	
July 14, 2011	Madrid	Spain	Estadio Vicente Calderón	David Guetta
North America
July 29, 2011	White Sulphur Springs	United States	Greenbrier Classic	—N/a
July 30, 2011	Columbia	United States	Merriweather Post Pavilion	—N/a
September 3, 2011	Minot	United States	North Dakota State Fair	—N/a
September 23, 2011^{[C]}	Paradise	United States	MGM Grand	—N/a
September 30, 2011	New York City	United States	Central Park	—N/a
Asia
October 25, 2011	Pasay	Philippines	SM Mall of Asia Concert Grounds	—N/a
South America
November 12, 2011^{[D]}	Paulínia	Brazil	SWU Music & Arts	—N/a
November 15, 2011	Asunción	Paraguay	Jockey Club	—N/a
North America
November 23, 2011	Miami Gardens	United States	Sun Life Stadium	Sean Kingston; Jason Derulo; T-Pain; CeeLo Green; Queen Latifah

Music festivals and other miscellaneous performances
^{A} This concert is a part of the Wireless Festival concert series.
^{B} This concert is a part of the Oxegen concert series.
^{C} This concert is a part of the iHeartRadio concert series.
^{D} This concert is a part of the SWU Music & Arts concert series.
