= Masters of the Sun =

Masters of the Sun may refer to:

- Masters of the Sun Vol. 1, a studio album by The Black Eyed Peas
- Masters of the Sun (comic), a graphic novel by Marvel Comics and The Black Eyed Peas
