= Jockey Club (Asunción) =

Horse racing track in Asunción, Paraguay

Coordinates: 25°19′0.5″S 57°35′4.9″W

Hipódromo de Asunción
- Interactive map of Hipódromo de Asunción
- Location: Asunción, Paraguay
- Date opened: 18 September 1954
- Race type: Thoroughbred

The Hipódromo de Asunción (sometimes known as Hipódromo de Tembetary or most commonly Jockey Club) is an 80,000-seat horse racing track located in the neighborhood of the same name in Asunción, Paraguay. It is owned by the Jockey Club del Paraguay. It was inaugurated on 18 September 1954 and is the largest in the country.

The grass track is 1,810 m long and 20 m wide, allowing for 450-metre races without turn.

== Concerts ==
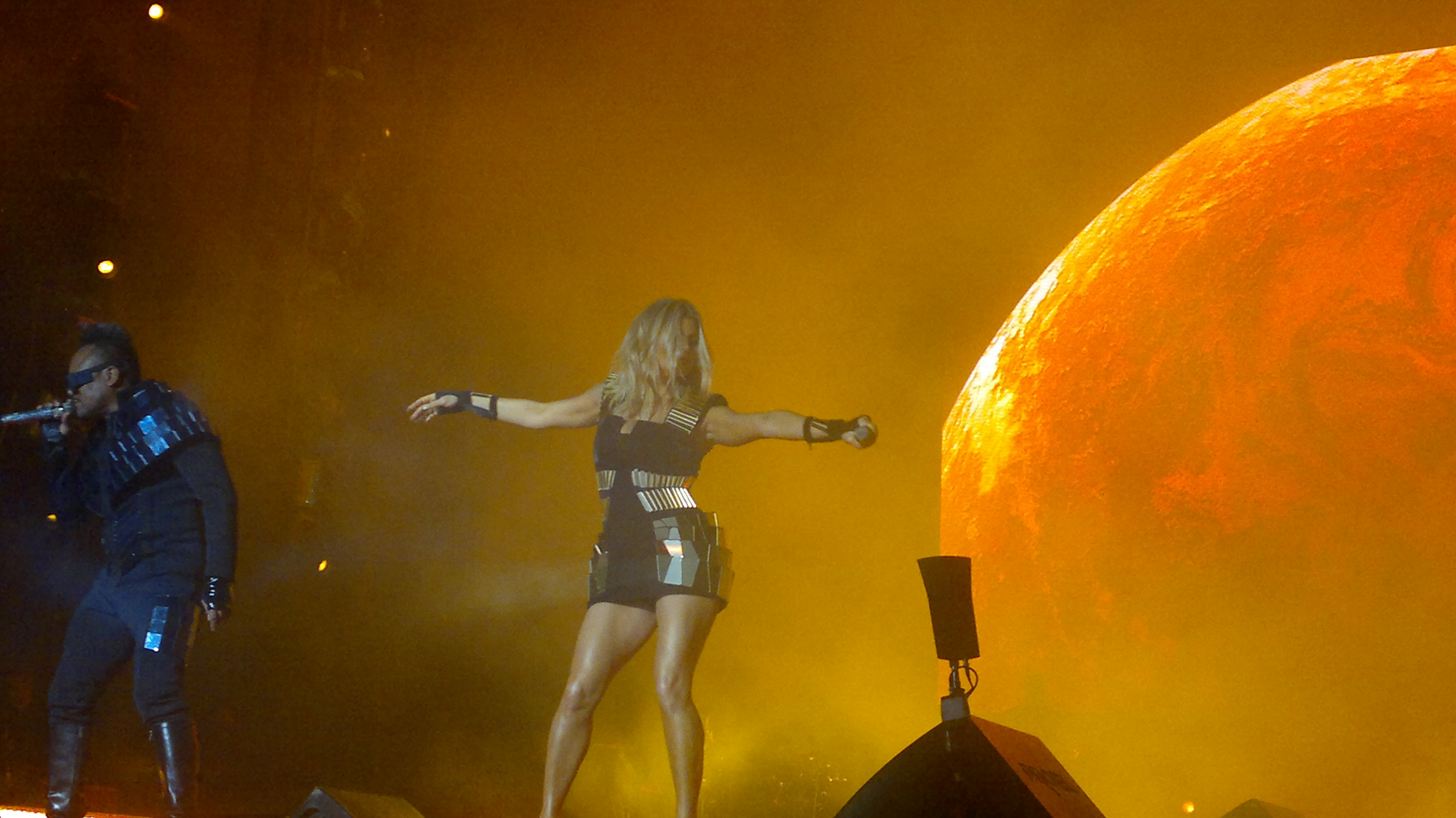
The Black Eyed Peas during their The Beginning Tour at the Jockey Club.

In recent years it became a popular concert venue. Among the first events was Pilsen Rock, a rock festival with national and international artists. Due to its high capacity, the place is a good scenario for performers visiting this city.

Below is a partial list of international artists who performed at the Jockey Club.

Country	Artist	Date
(Guatemala)	Ricardo Arjona	30 May 2026
(United States)	Korn	13 May 2026
(United States)	The Killers	19 March 2026
(Uruguay)	No Te Va Gustar	19 March 2026
(Argentina)	YSY A	19 March 2026
(Spain)	Aitana	19 March 2026
(Argentina)	Él Mató a un Policía Motorizado	19 March 2026
(Argentina)	Yami Safdie	19 March 2026
(United States)	Sabrina Carpenter	18 March 2026
(New Zealand)	Lorde	18 March 2026
(United States)	Doechii	18 March 2026
(South Korea)	Peggy Gou	18 March 2026
(United States)	Addison Rae	18 March 2026
(Mexico)	The Warning	18 March 2026
(United States)	Deftones	17 March 2026
(United States)	Skrillex	17 March 2026
(United States)	Turnstile	17 March 2026
(United States)	Interpol	17 March 2026
(Sweden)	Viagra Boys	17 March 2026
(Venezuela)	Ricardo Montaner	7 March 2026
(Argentina)	Florencia Bertotti	7 December 2025
(Puerto Rico)	Omar Courtz	5 December 2025
(Puerto Rico)	De La Rose	5 December 2025
(Puerto Rico)	Izaak	5 December 2025
(Argentina)	Airbag	11 October 2025
(United States)	Green Day	15 September 2025
(United Kingdom)	Keane	16 November 2024
(United Kingdom)	The Kooks	16 November 2024
(Argentina)	Usted Señalemelo	16 November 2024
(Argentina)	Silvestre y La Naranja	16 November 2024
(United Kingdom)	Louis Tomlinson	21 May 2024
(Puerto Rico)	Anuel AA	1 September 2023
(Mexico)	Grupo Frontera	29 July 2023
(United Kingdom)	Arctic Monkeys	10 November 2022
(Argentina)	Él Mató a un policía Motorizado	10 November 2022
(United States)	Interpol	10 November 2022
(Mexico)	Kevin Kaarl	10 November 2022
(Colombia)	J Balvin	29 October 2022
(United Kingdom)	Billy Idol	15 September 2022
(Argentina)	Catupecu Machu	11 September 2022
(Argentina)	Las Pastillas del Abuelo	11 September 2022
(Argentina)	Turf	11 September 2022
(Uruguay)	La Vela Puerca	10 September 2022
(Argentina)	Bersuit Vergarabat	10 September 2022
(Colombia)	Aterciopelados	10 September 2022
(Guatemala)	Ricardo Arjona	13 August 2022
(Puerto Rico)	Wisin & Yandel	10 June 2022
(Puerto Rico)	Farruko	6 November 2021
(Brazil)	Alok	15 February 2020
(Brazil)	Anitta	15 February 2020
(Colombia)	Sebastián Yatra	15 February 2020
(United Kingdom)	Keane	27 November 2019
(Mexico)	Marco Antonio Solís	23 November 2019
(Puerto Rico)	Don Omar	20 and 21 September 2019
(Uruguay)	No Te Va Gustar	7 September 2019
(Argentina)	Babasónicos	7 September 2019
(Mexico)	Molotov	7 September 2019
(Argentina)	Carajo	7 September 2019
(Argentina)	Guasones	7 September 2019
(Mexico)	Luis Miguel	7 March 2019
(Puerto Rico)	Wisin & Yandel	2 March 2019
(Puerto Rico)	Bad Bunny	22 February 2019
(United Kingdom)	Robbie Williams	8 November 2018
(Guatemala)	Ricardo Arjona	7 April 2018
(Colombia)	J Balvin	12 August 2017
(Argentina)	Soy Luna en Concierto	3 April 2017
(Argentina)	Violetta Live	5 May 2015
(United States)	Nicky Jam	2 May 2015
(Netherlands)	Hardwell	30 April 2015
(Belgium)	Dimitri Vegas & Like Mike	30 April 2015
(Netherlands)	Dannic	30 April 2015
(Spain)	Enrique Iglesias	18 April 2015
(United Kingdom)	Calvin Harris	20 March 2015
(United Kingdom)	Kasabian	20 March 2015
(United States)	Skrillex	20 March 2015
(United Kingdom)	Bastille	20 March 2015
(United States)	Major Lazer	20 March 2015
(United States)	Fitz and the Tantrums	20 March 2015
(South Africa)	Kongos	20 March 2015
(United States)	Jack White	19 March 2015
(United Kingdom)	Robert Plant	19 March 2015
(United States)	The Smashing Pumpkins	19 March 2015
(United Kingdom)	The Kooks	19 March 2015
(United States)	Foster the People	19 March 2015
(United States)	Interpol	19 March 2015
(United Kingdom)	alt-J	19 March 2015
(United States)	St. Vincent	19 March 2015
(United States)	Romeo Santos	5 March 2015
(Netherlands)	Tiësto	19 February 2015
(Netherlands)	Oliver Heldens	19 February 2015
(Netherlands)	Showtek	19 February 2015
(Netherlands)	Martin Garrix	6 November 2014
(France)	David Guetta	6 November 2014
(United Kingdom)	Echo & the Bunnymen	6 November 2014
(Netherlands)	Fedde le Grand	6 November 2014
(United States)	Prince Royce	30 April 2014
(United States)	Guns N' Roses	9 April 2014
(United States)	Metallica	24 March 2014
(Puerto Rico)	Calle 13	8 March 2014
(United States)	Marc Anthony	10 November 2013
(Canada)	Justin Bieber	6 November 2013
(United States)	Red Hot Chili Peppers	5 November 2013
(United Kingdom)	Iron Maiden	29 September 2013
(United States)	Slayer	29 September 2013
(Sweden)	Ghost	29 September 2013
(United Kingdom)	The Cure	9 April 2013
(United States)	The Killers	26 March 2013
(Puerto Rico)	Wisin & Yandel	23 February 2013
(United Kingdom)	Jamiroquai	13 February 2013
(United States)	Lady Gaga	26 November 2012
(United States)	Kiss	12 November 2012
(United States)	Evanescence	19 October 2012
(United States)	Maroon 5	1 September 2012
(United Kingdom)	Keane	23 August 2012
(United States)	Romeo Santos	1 August 2012
(Brazil)	Ivete Sangalo	18 May 2012
(United Kingdom)	Noel Gallagher's High Flying Birds	8 May 2012
(Spain)	Serrat and Sabina	11 April 2012
(Mexico)	Maná	15 December 2011
(United States)	Megadeth	27 November 2011
(United States)	Black Eyed Peas	15 November 2011
(United States)	Aerosmith	26 October 2011
(United States)	Guns N' Roses	15 October 2011
(United States)	Nick Jonas	29 September 2011
(Puerto Rico)	Ricky Martin	9 September 2011
(United States)	Limp Bizkit	29 July 2011
(United States)	Miley Cyrus	10 May 2011
(United States)	Deftones	8 April 2011
(Colombia)	Shakira	8 March 2011
(Brazil)	Daniela Mercury	2007
(Argentina)	2 Minutos	2006
(Argentina)	Divididos	2006
(Argentina)	Intoxicados	2006
(Uruguay)	No Te Va Gustar	2005
(Argentina)	La Mosca	2005
(Argentina)	Los Auténticos Decadentes	2005
(Mexico)	Molotov	2005
(Argentina)	Rata Blanca	2005
(Brazil)	Cidade Negra	2005
(Argentina)	Attaque 77	2005
(Brazil)	Os Paralamas do Sucesso	2005
(Argentina)	Miranda!	2005
(Argentina)	Los Ratones Paranoicos	2005
