= Masters of the Sun Vol. 1 =

2018 album by Black Eyed Peas

Studio album by Black Eyed Peas
- Released: October 26, 2018
- Genre: Hip-hop
- Length: 58:16
- Label: Interscope
- Producers: will.i.am; Paperboy; U-N-I; High P; David Luke; Ali Shaheed Muhammad; Keith Harris; DJ Ammo

Black Eyed Peas chronology
The Beginning (2010)	Masters of the Sun Vol. 1 (2018)	Translation (2020)

Singles from Masters of the Sun Vol. 1
- 1. "Ring the Alarm pt.1 pt.2 pt.3" Released: May 18, 2018; 2. "Constant pt.1 pt.2" Released: August 30, 2018; 3. "Big Love" Released: September 12, 2018; 4. "Dopeness" Released: November 9, 2018

Masters of the Sun Vol. 1 is the seventh studio album by American musical group Black Eyed Peas. A political album loosely inspired by the graphic novel of the same name and the contemporary social climate of the United States, it is a departure from Black Eyed Peas' electronic dance and pop-influenced albums The E.N.D. and The Beginning, marking a return to the group's hip-hop and boom bap style of their early career. The album was Black Eyed Peas' first in eight years, and their first album following the departure of Fergie earlier in 2018. It is also their first where they are credited as Black Eyed Peas (without the 'the' prefix) since Bridging the Gap in 2000. Preceded by numerous singles and music videos, Masters of the Sun Vol. 1 was released on October 26, 2018, and it is the last Black Eyed Peas album with longtime label Interscope Records.

== Background ==
Described by will.i.am as "party album[s]", Black Eyed Peas released the electronic dance-influenced The E.N.D. and The Beginning in 2009 and 2010, following the 2008 election of Barack Obama as President of the United States. The band welcomed Obama's election; will.i.am had recorded and released "Yes We Can", a single that promoted Obama's election campaign during the Democratic Party primaries, and often claims the song had helped Obama get elected. The band's most commercially successful single during this period, "I Gotta Feeling", was inspired by the band's perception of being "in the center of a ginormous change in America". The track became the best-selling digital song of all time until it was surpassed by Pharrell Williams' "Happy" in 2014. By the end of 2010, The E.N.D. had sold over eleven million copies worldwide, while The Beginning had sold over two million copies worldwide. The band had intended to return to the studio to create their seventh studio album soon after the release of The Beginning, though frequent delays and Taboo's diagnosis with testicular cancer in 2014, along with his subsequent treatment and recovery, led to the project being put on hiatus.

The deteriorating political and social climate in the United States towards the end of Obama's presidency caused concern in the band, with deaths by law enforcement and the unrest in Ferguson, Missouri, inspiring the band to write "Ring the Alarm" in 2014. In August 2016, the band released a remake of "Where Is the Love?", with updated lyrics and numerous featured artists, addressing topics such as the Black Lives Matter movement, gun violence in the United States, the Syrian civil war and refugee crisis, and terrorism in Europe. The band purposed the remake as a "[call] for calm" that asked "to stop the hate and violence that has resulted in many lives lost." In 2017, Black Eyed Peas collaborated with Marvel Comics to release Masters of the Sun, a science fiction superhero graphic novel that references social issues and street culture in Los Angeles. The novel's adaptation for augmented reality devices featured a downbeat jazz and soul soundtrack composed by Hans Zimmer, which inspired the "mood" of the next Black Eyed Peas album. will.i.am was adamant about departing from the pop-centric sound of The E.N.D. and The Beginning, to the dismay of the group's record label Interscope.

== Composition ==
Masters of the Sun Vol. 1 is a political album that addresses social issues such as gun violence, police brutality, race relations, and the effects of social media. will.i.am allegorizes the album's lyrical themes to a GPS, feeling that the "world wants some direction." The group stuck to a general philosophy of "art, smart, and heart" during the creative process, aiming to depict their philanthropic career through their music, in contrast to their earlier production-centric albums, and challenging themselves to constantly re-write lines to make them better. Musically, the album is a return to the group's hip-hop and boom bap style from Behind the Front and Bridging the Gap, their first two albums released in 1998 and 2000, respectively. Black Eyed Peas also took inspiration from Atban Klann, an early 1990s hip-hop group that involved a teenage will.i.am and apl.de.ap; the group often envisioned what their teenage selves would have written about the world today. "Big Love" is a pop-rap track penned with the premise of "reminding the world the importance of love", drawing comparisons to "Where Is the Love?" from Black Eyed Peas' 2003 album Elephunk. The song is based on a simple piano progression and gritty drum pattern, with lyrics referencing government corruption, drug addiction and gun control in the frame of a "day in the life of a kid in America", the song's opening line.

== Promotion ==
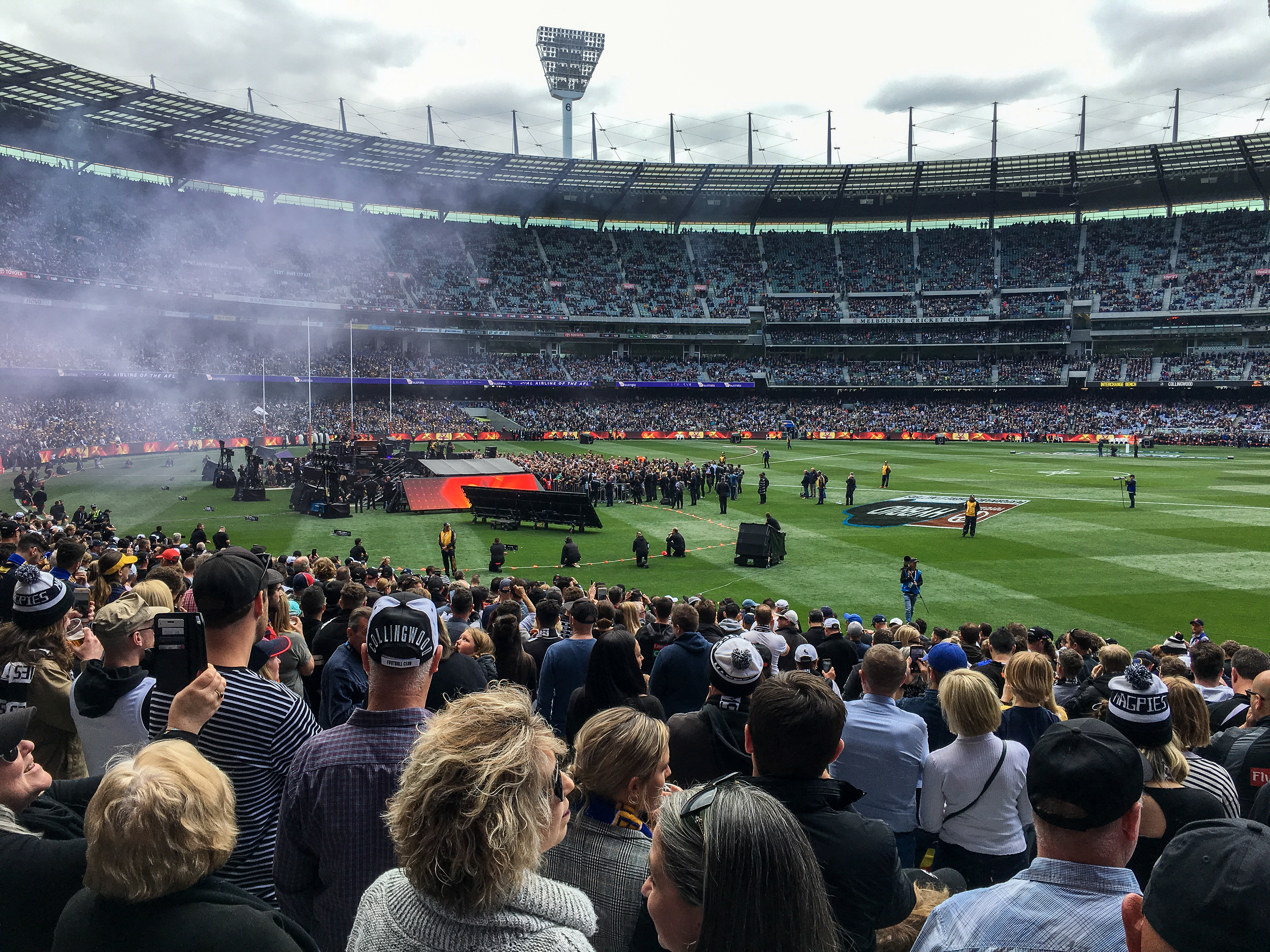
Panoramic view of The Black Eyed Peas' performance at the 2018 AFL Grand Final.

Prior to the announcement and release of Masters of the Sun Vol. 1, Black Eyed Peas released numerous singles throughout 2018 from recording sessions for the album: "Street Livin'" on January 9, "Ring the Alarm" on May 18, "Get It" on July 10, and "Constant" on August 30, each with accompanying music videos, the former three of which politically-charged. Coinciding with the release of "Ring the Alarm", the group's website was updated with interactive features that allowed users to earn digital tokens for positive interactions with the group on social media, which were redeemable for exclusive content and meet and greets with the group. Masters of the Sun Vol. 1 was announced via a press release by Black Eyed Peas and Interscope Records on September 12, 2018. "Big Love" was simultaneously released as the lead single promoting the album. Its two-part music video raising awareness of gun control and anti-separation movements in the United States was released on September 21, and profits from sales of the single were donated to gun control activist group March for Our Lives and the anti-separation activist group Families Belong Together. Masters of the Sun Vol. 1 was released on October 26, 2018, by Interscope Records, after being delayed a fortnight past its intended release date of October 12. Pre-orders for the album started on October 19. It was the group's first album in eight years after the release of The Beginning in 2010.

The group appeared as one of two pre-match entertainment acts at the 2018 AFL Grand Final, along with Australian rock musician Jimmy Barnes, performing "Big Love" along with a number of their earlier hits with The Voice of the Philippines finalist Jessica Reynoso. The performance was met with criticism, especially for a moment in which will.i.am pulled out his phone mid-performance, prompting an apologetic response from will.i.am and Taboo on Twitter. The group embarked on the Masters of the Sun Tour to promote the album, performing fourteen shows across Europe in October and November 2018. A second leg of the tour in Asia occurred in 2019.

== Sampling controversy ==
British electronic musician Lone, along with his record label R&S, publicly accused Black Eyed Peas of illegally sampling his 2013 track "Airglow Fires" for Masters of the Sun's fifth track, "Constant". R&S alleged that neither the band or Interscope Records contacted them or Warp Publishing for permission to sample the track. Both Black Eyed Peas and will.i.am had previously been embroiled in similar legal controversies over "Party All the Time" from The E.N.D. and "Let's Go" from #willpower.

== Reception ==
Professional ratings
Review scores
Source	Rating
AllMusic	4/5 stars
HipHopDX	4.1/5
Newsday	3.5/4 stars
Rolling Stone	3/5 stars

Masters of Sun Vol.1 generally received positive reviews by the music critics, Glenn Gamboa of Newsday praised the album as a "welcome return" for the band, writing that the band had "[recaptured] the edge the Peas once had" on "Yes or No", and singled out the socially conscious lyrics of "Ring the Alarm", jazz influences on "Vibrations", and Nicole Scherzinger's performance on "Wings" as positives.

== Track listing ==
No.	Title	Writer(s)	Producer(s)	Length
1.	"Back 2 Hiphop" (featuring Nas)	will.i.am; apl.de.ap; Taboo; Nasir Jones; Joshua Alvarez; Mike McHenry	Paperboy; will.i.am	5:18
2.	"Yes or No"	will.i.am; apl.de.ap; Taboo	will.i.am; U.N.I.	5:04
3.	"Get Ready"	will.i.am; apl.de.ap; Taboo; Lauren Evans	will.i.am; High P	4:10
4.	"4ever" (featuring Esthero)	will.i.am; apl.de.ap; Taboo; Alvarez	will.i.am	3:48
5.	"Constant pt.1 pt.2" (featuring Slick Rick)	will.i.am; apl.de.ap; Taboo; U.N.I.; Damien LeRoy; Keith Harris; Evans; David Quinones	U.N.I.^{[a]}; Dj Ammo^{[b]}; will.i.am^{[b]}; Harris^{[c]}	5:03
6.	"Dopeness" (featuring CL)	will.i.am; apl.de.ap; Taboo; Alvarez; Lee Chae-rin	will.i.am	4:38
7.	"All Around the World" (featuring Phife Dawg, Ali Shaheed Muhammad and Posdnuos)	Dawg; apl.de.ap; Taboo; will.i.am; Kelvin Mercer; Alvarez; Harris; Karlina Alexandra Covington	Muhammad; David Luke; will.i.am^{[d]}	5:01
8.	"New Wave"	will.i.am; apl.de.ap; Taboo; Harris; LeRoy	will.i.am; Dj Ammo^{[d]}; Harris^{[d]}	4:54
9.	"Vibrations pt.1 pt.2"	will.i.am; apl.de.ap; Taboo; Harris; U.N.I.	U.N.I.^{[a]}; Double X^{[b]}	4:21
10.	"Wings" (featuring Nicole Scherzinger)	will.i.am; apl.de.ap; Taboo	will.i.am	5:17
11.	"Ring the Alarm pt.1 pt.2 pt.3"	will.i.am; apl.de.ap; Taboo; Rita Ekwere; Jean-Baptiste; Alvarez; DJ Motiv8	will.i.am, DJ Motiv8	5:58
12.	"Big Love"	will.i.am; Anders Grahn; James Flannigan; Aeon "Step" Manahan; Taboo; Alvarez; apl.de.ap; Benjamin "Benyad" Mor	will.i.am	4:35
Total length:				58:16

Japanese edition bonus tracks
No.	Title	Writer(s)	Producer(s)	Length
13.	"Street Livin'"	will.i.am; apl.de.ap; Taboo; Alvarez; Eumir Deodato; Pacifico Mascarenhas	will.i.am; Harris	3:04
14.	"Get It"	will.i.am; apl.de.ap	will.i.am	3:30
15.	"Constant pt.2 (Extended Version)"	will.i.am; apl.de.ap; Taboo; U.N.I.; LeRoy; Harris; Evans; Quinones	U.N.I.; Ammo; will.i.am; Harris	6:01
Total length:				70:51

Notes

- ^{^a} signifies a producer for part 1
- ^{^b} signifies a producer for part 2
- ^{^c} signifies an additional producer
- ^{^d} signifies a co-producer
- All track titles are capitalised, except for "pt.1 pt 2" in tracks 5 and 9, and "pt.1 pt.2 pt.3" in track 11. For example. "Ring the Alarm pt1. pt.2 pt.3" is stylised as "RING THE ALARM pt.1 pt.2 pt.3"

== Personnel ==
Black Eyed Peas

- will.i.am – vocals on all tracks, piano, keyboards, programming, turntables
- apl.de.ap – vocals on all tracks except 15 [Japan edition], turntables
- Taboo – vocals on all tracks except 14 [Japan edition] and 15 [Japan edition], turntables
- J. Rey Soul – vocals on all tracks except 3, 7, and 14 [Japan edition]

Additional musicians

- CL – vocals (track 6)
- Lauren Evans – co-writer (tracks 3, 5); vocals (track 3)
- Ludacris – associate producer (track 7)
- Ali Shaheed Muhammad – bass guitar (track 7)
- Nas – vocals (track 1)
- Phife Dawg – vocals (track 7)
- Posdnuos – vocals (track 7)
- Karlina Covington – vocals (track 7)
- Nicole Scherzinger – vocals (track 10)
- Slick Rick – vocals (track 5)
- DJ Motiv8 – co-producer (track 11)
- Mooky Mook – co-writer (tracks 1, 4, 6, 7, 11, 12, and 13 [Japan edition])

== Charts ==
Chart (2018)	Peak position
Belgian Albums (Ultratop Flanders)	167
Belgian Albums (Ultratop Wallonia)	158
French Albums (SNEP)	112
Japan Hot Albums (Billboard Japan)	94
Japanese Albums (Oricon)	118
Swiss Albums (Schweizer Hitparade)	55
UK Album Downloads (OCC)	72
UK R&B Albums (Official Charts)	27
US Top R&B/Hip-Hop Album Sales (Billboard)	35

== Release history ==
Country	Date	Format	Label	Catalogue
Australia	October 26, 2018	Digital download; streaming	Interscope	1439145773
Australia	November 9, 2018	CD	Interscope	360391
Japan	December 5, 2018	CD	Universal Music Japan	
