= Don't Stop the Party =

Don't Stop the Party may refer to:

- "Don't Stop the Party" (Black Eyed Peas song), 2011
- "Don't Stop the Party" (Pitbull song), 2012
