= Damien LeRoy =

- Also known as: DJ Ammo
- Born: Damien LeRoy
- Origin: Los Angeles, California, U.S.
- Genres: Dance, house, pop, hip hop
- Occupations: Disc jockey, music producer
- Years active: 2009–present
- Label: Interscope
- Website: Official Website

Damien LeRoy, sometimes known professionally by the alias DJ Ammo, is an American disc jockey and music producer from Los Angeles, California. He has co-produced "The Time (Dirty Bit)" along with three other songs from The Black Eyed Peas' sixth studio album, The Beginning, and "4th of July (Fireworks)" by Kelis. He produced the song "Touch the Sky" by Sean Paul, which was included in his fifth studio album, Tomahawk Technique. He also co-wrote and co-produced the song "Tik Tik Boom" by Britney Spears for her eighth studio album, Britney Jean.

== Early life ==
Hip-hop led the fledgling producer behind the board for the very first time. In junior high, he began making his own beats, while religiously attending professional acting school and spending time on the sets of stepfather's films. As a teenager, he assumed the moniker DJ Ammo and officially hit the clubs. Whilst doing this, he eventually met Black Eyed Peas. Organically, he became friends with will.i.am and apl.de.ap, leading to his very first remix. They invited him on the World Tour in 2009 as a DJ and producer for Black Eyed Peas, and he spent the next 5 years performing in front of packed arenas and festivals all around the world.

== Later life ==
In 2010, will.i.am tapped him to handle the production of six tracks on the Black Eyed Peas album The Beginning, including the chart-topping singles "The Time (Dirty Bit)" "Don't Stop the Party" and “ Just Can’t Get Enough. From there, he went on to produce and remix high-profile tracks for everyone from Nicki Minaj Sean Paul, Lil' Jon to LMFAO, Peaches and Dragonette. At the same time, he started writing tracks of his own. His edgy approach to EDM encompassed a sexy rave power, while delicately infusing pop palatability.

In 2013, he produced 3 songs on the new will.i.am #willpower album including the single #thatPOWER featuring Justin Bieber. Among his own singles, Damien Leroy’s unleashed the distorted flurry "Party Police” Feat. Chebacca. Live, he's performed in various clubs around the world as well as at Electric Daisy Carnival (EDC) 2012 alongside some of the titans of the genre.

In 2017, he produced 2 singles on Fergie's Double Dutchess Album. "There's a lot of crossover," he says in an interview. "I'm heavily evolved in the underground world. When I do things in pop, I try to take those influences and filter them through the mainstream. I like existing in the indie and commercial realms simultaneously.” He continues, “I'm always trying to push the borders and pioneer something new, I want to come up with something fresh that hasn't been done yet.

== Discography ==
=== As featured artist ===
Year	Title	Peak chart positions					Album
Year	Title	AUT	BEL (Vl)	BEL (Wa)	FRA	GER	Album
2010	"The Time (Dirty Bit)" (The Black Eyed Peas)	-	-	-	-	-	The Beginning
2010	"Don't Stop The Party" (The Black Eyed Peas)	-	-	-	-	-	The Beginning
2010	"Fashion Beats" (The Black Eyed Peas)	-	-	-	-	-	The Beginning
2010	"The Situation" (The Black Eyed Peas)	-	-	-	-	-	The Beginning
2010	"Just Can't Get Enough" (The Black Eyed Peas)	-	-	-	-	-	The Beginning
2010	"Do It Like This" (The Black Eyed Peas)	-	-	-	-	-	The Beginning
2010	"4th of July (Fireworks)" (Kelis)	-	-	-	-	-	Flesh Tone
2012	"Drink" (Lil Jon featuring LMFAO)	-	-	-	-	-	"Drink"
2012	"Touch the Sky" (Sean Paul featuring DJ Ammo)	44	75	56	139	31	Tomahawk Technique
2013	"Tik Tik Boom" (Britney Spears featuring T.I.)	-	-	-	-	-	Britney Jean
2013	"Going Out" (apl.de.ap featuring Damien Leroy)	-	-	-	-	-	Going Out
2013	"#thatPOWER" (will.i.am featuring Justin Bieber)	-	-	-	-	-	#thatPOWER
2013	"Great Times" (will.i.am)	-	-	-	-	-	Great Times
2014	"It's My Birthday" (will.i.am featuring Cody Wise)	-	-	-	-	-	It's My Birthday
2017	"You Already Know" (Fergie featuring Nicki Minaj)	-	-	-	-	-	Double Dutchess
2017	"Like It Ain't Nuttin'" (Fergie)	-	-	-	-	-	Double Dutchess
2019	"I like it Alot'" (AMMO featuring Sir Bloke)	-	-	-	-	-	N/A
2019	"eXplosion'" (Black Eyed Peas featuring Anitta)	-	-	-	-	-	Non-Album Song
2020	"DURO HARD'" (Black Eyed Peas featuring Becky G)	-	-	-	-	-	Translation
2021	"Hit It'" (Black Eyed Peas featuring Saweetie & Lele Pons)	-	-	-	-	-	Single
2022	"Simply The Best'" (Black Eyed Peas featuring Anitta & El Alfa)	-	-	-	-	-	Single
