= The Beginning (Black Eyed Peas album) =

- Standard cover (Note: Deluxe edition cover displays a black background and multi-coloured blocks instead of blue.)

Studio album by the Black Eyed Peas
- Released: November 26, 2010
- Recorded: 2010
- Genre: Pop
- Length: 54:05
- Label: Interscope
- Producers: will.i.am; DJ Ammo; Free School; David Guetta; Giorgio Tuinfort; Rodney "Darkchild" Jerkins; apl.de.ap; Replay

The Black Eyed Peas chronology
The E.N.D. (2009)	The Beginning (2010)	Masters of the Sun Vol. 1 (2018)

Singles from The Beginning
- 1. "The Time (Dirty Bit)" Released: November 3, 2010; 2. "Just Can't Get Enough" Released: February 18, 2011; 3. "Don't Stop the Party" Released: June 24, 2011; 4. "Whenever" Released: August 24, 2011

The Beginning is the sixth studio album by American group the Black Eyed Peas. It was released on November 26, 2010, by Interscope Records. It is a prequel to the group's previous album The E.N.D. (2009). Its lead single, "The Time (Dirty Bit)", was released on November 9, 2010. The second single, "Just Can't Get Enough" was released on February 18, 2011, while its third and final single, "Don't Stop the Party", was released on June 24, 2011.

The Beginning debuted at number six on the US Billboard 200 chart, with first-week sales of 119,000 units; critical reception was generally mixed to negative. The album was the group's final project to feature Fergie as a member, and was followed by a five-year hiatus.

== Background ==
On June 6, 2010, the band confirmed that they were working on a new album in an interview for The Big Issue. The album was described as a sequel to The E.N.D. will.i.am announced that the new album, which "symbolizes growth, new beginnings, and starts a fresh new perspective," would be titled The Beginning and be released on November 30, 2010. The album was officially announced in a press release on October 26, 2010.

Some songs were made available as promotional singles for the album release. The first, "Do It Like This", was released on November 15, 2010, and the second, "Light Up the Night", on November 22, 2010. The Beginning was one of Oprah's Favorite Things for 2010, and members of Oprah's audience were given copies of the album 11 days before its official release.

A tour called The Beginning Massive Stadium Tour began in June 2011 in France and ended in November 2011 with a total of 20 shows.

== Singles ==
- "The Time (Dirty Bit)" was released as the lead single from The Beginning on November 3, 2010. It officially debuted on United States radio on November 16, 2010. The music video for "The Time (Dirty Bit)" was released on November 23, 2010, and was directed by Rich Lee, who had previously directed the video for "Rock That Body" and "Imma Be". The song topped the charts in more than 15 countries.
- "Just Can't Get Enough" was released as the album's second single when it impacted US mainstream on February 8, 2011. It was announced on January 21, 2011, via Twitter and their official site that it would become a single. The music video for "Just Can't Get Enough" was directed by Ben Mor. It was shot over a three-day period in Tokyo just one week before the 2011 Tōhoku earthquake and tsunami. The song topped the charts in many countries.
- "Don't Stop the Party" was announced as the third single from The Beginning by will.i.am on May 9, 2011. A music video for the song was released on iTunes the next day, along with the single. The video, which is directed by Ben Mor, features on stage and backstage footage of the group during their 'The E.N.D World Tour' throughout 2009 and 2010.

=== Promotional singles ===
- "Do It Like This", was released on November 16, 2010, worldwide and on November 26 on iTunes. It was the first promotional single from the album as part of "The Countdown to The Beginning".
- "Light Up the Night" was the second promotional single from the album and was released on November 24, 2010, worldwide and on November 26 on iTunes. The song charted at number 99 at the Canadian Hot 100.

=== Other notable songs ===
- "Love You Long Time" had charted, at the first week after the album's release, at number 36 on the UK Dance Chart.
- "Someday" had charted in 2011. The first was featured in the 2010 film Knight and Day and charted at number 80 on the Canadian Hot 100 and the second at number 16 on the French Singles Chart.
- "Whenever" also serves as the fourth single from the album in France, and is used to promote the album in TV spots.

== Critical reception ==
Professional ratings
Aggregate scores
Source	Rating
Metacritic	47/100
Review scores
Source	Rating
AllMusic	3/5 stars
The A.V. Club	F
Consequence of Sound	3/5 stars
Entertainment Weekly	B+
The Guardian	3/5 stars
Los Angeles Times	2/4 stars
MusicOMH	1.5/5 stars
Rolling Stone	3/5 stars
Slant Magazine	2/5 stars
Spin	(7/10)

The Beginning received generally mixed reviews from most music critics. The album was praised for its production, but it was heavily criticized by the lack of appearance of Fergie, will.i.am's vocals, use of Auto-Tune, and lyrics. At Metacritic, which assigns a normalized rating out of 100 to reviews from mainstream critics, the album received an average score of 47, based on 19 reviews, which indicates "mixed or average reviews".

Monica Herrera wrote for Billboard that "the music is expertly produced, but problems arise when Will.i.am claims the same of his wordplay. On the track "Don't Stop the Party," he chest-thumps, "Kill you with my lyricals/Call me verbal criminal." It's a silly boast for an artist who clearly focuses on beats over rhymes, and is probably better off for it." Kevin O'Donnell of Spin described the album as "one of the year's wildest sonic stews" and concluded "Pop's reigning peddlers of dumb fun are actually starting to sound stylishly avant-garde on their sixth album." The Guardian's Caroline Sullivan gave the album 3 out of 5 stars calling it "upscale hip-pop" and said that "the Black Eyed Peas have created an album similar to 2009's enormously successful The END, but with more Auto-Tune and less input from the wonderful Fergie." Rolling Stone reviewer Jon Dolan viewed that the album "largely picks up where The E.N.D. left off" and felt that "they give themselves over more fully than ever to the groove palette of club culture, stirring up electro funk, Euro-trance and classic disco." John Bush of Allmusic gave the album 3 out of 5 stars, and noted that although David Guetta only appears on one track "his production job for 2009’s “I Gotta Feeling” casts a long shadow on this record of don't-stop-the-party jams and club-life tracks."

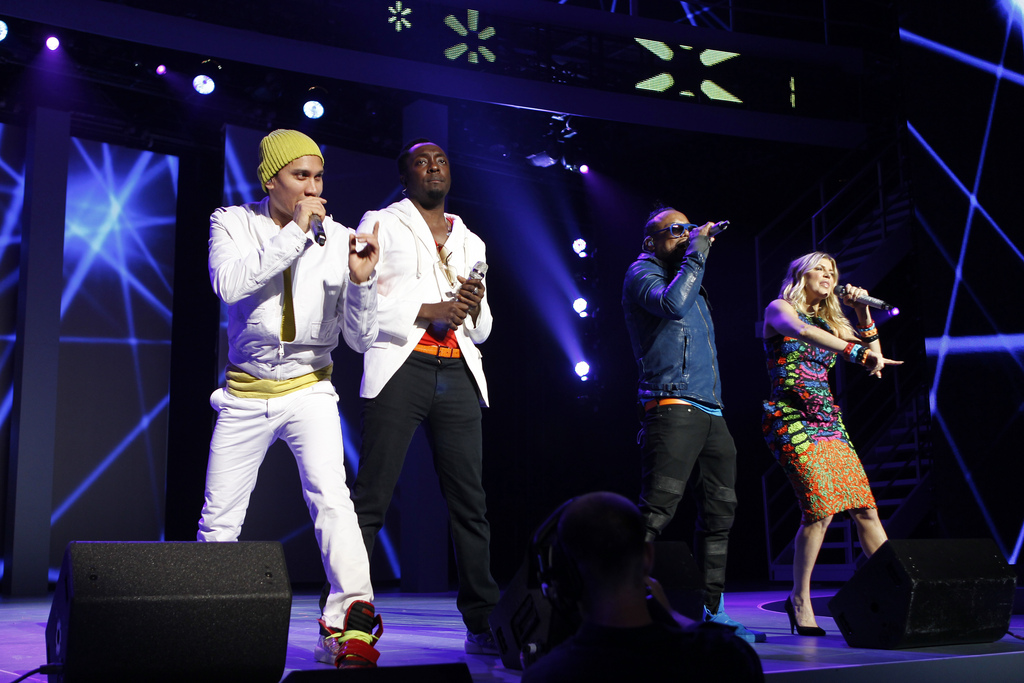
The Black Eyed Peas performing "Don't Stop the Party" in Walmart Meeting, 2011

Entertainment Weekly writer Simon Vozick-Levinson gave the album a very positive review and stated "The Beginning wisely sticks with the heavier electronic beats they began importing from European clubs for The E.N.D. — a key ingredient that transformed the Black Eyed Peas from merely major stars to arguably the biggest chart act going [...] Every song is piled high with sticky pop melodies, slick hip-hop rhythms, bright synth parts, and vocals that have been diced and processed to high heaven, all furthering the goal of maximum catchiness." Greg Kot of Chicago Tribune gave the album 1.5 out of 4 stars and called it "the quartet’s tamest, most hook-deprived album in the Fergie era" and stated "the music’s reliance on rhythmic and lyrical repetition (as opposed to progression and surprise) becomes wearying." In his review for The Independent, Andy Gill gave it three out of five stars and wrote "It's a textbook blend of the over-familiar and the electronically treated, though their use of auto-tune and digital-stutter vocal effects is a touch more restrained than usual. From there on, the aspect never extends beyond the dancefloor, with martial synth-stomp riffs, spartan electro beats and loping bass grooves driving tracks." Ben Ratliff of The New York Times gave the album a negative review and noted it similarities with its predecessor, The E.N.D. with few differences, "less of Fergie’s actressy, un-Autotuned belting (too bad about that), bolder two-step techno beats, more heavily draped synthesizer tones and a fascination with late ’70s and early ’80s pop radio." and found the lyrics "soggy" and "cynical." musicOMH writer Luke Winkie stated that "will.i.am's productions sound like the bare minimum one could throw together and call a beat, usually encompassed by a simplified drum sequence and a buzzsaw synth turned up to the red and repeated long enough for DJs to make their paycheck" and wrote "the band has a knack of elongating their elementally good ideas into preposterously tiresome compositions."

== Commercial performance ==
The album debuted at number six on the Billboard 200 chart, with first-week sales of 119,000 copies in the United States. It is their third album to chart inside the top ten, but their lowest charting album since Elephunk, which peaked at number 14 in 2003. As of October 2011, the album had sold over 800,000 copies in the United States.

In the United Kingdom, the album debuted at number 17 selling 34,006 copies. After a performance on The X Factor on December 5, 2010, the album rose eight places to number nine and subsequently spent three weeks in the top ten. In Canada, it debuted at number two selling 27,400 copies in its first week, being kept off the top spot by a margin of 200 copies behind Susan Boyle's The Gift. The album debuted at number one in France, selling 35,653 copies in its first week. It is Black Eyed Peas' third consecutive number-one album in the country.

In Germany, the album debuted at number five and started to slowly fall down. In its third week, the album was at No. 9 but could jump to No. 7 the following week. Following the success of the single "The Time (Dirty Bit)", the album rose from No. 7 to No. 2 in its fifth week, the album's peak position.

== Track listing ==
No.	Title	Writer(s)	Producer(s)	Length
1.	"The Time (Dirty Bit)"	William Adams; Allan Pineda; Damien LeRoy; Franke Previte; John DeNicola; Donald Markowitz	will.i.am; DJ Ammo	5:07
2.	"Light Up the Night"	Adams; Pineda; Keith Harris; Ricky Walters	will.i.am	4:21
3.	"Love You Long Time"	Adams; Stacy Ferguson; Joshua Alvarez	will.i.am	3:45
4.	"XOXOXO"	Adams; Pineda; Jean Baptiste	will.i.am	3:45
5.	"Someday"	Adams; Baptiste; Pineda; Jaime Gomez	will.i.am; Free School^{[a]}	4:33
6.	"Whenever"	Adams; Ferguson	will.i.am	3:16
7.	"Fashion Beats"	Adams; Ferguson; Harris; Nile Rodgers; Bernard Edwards	will.i.am; DJ Ammo	5:20
8.	"Don't Stop the Party"	Adams; Pineda; Gomez; Ferguson; Alvarez; LeRoy	DJ Ammo; will.i.am^{[a]}	6:07
9.	"Do It Like This"	Adams; Pineda; Gomez; LeRoy	DJ Ammo	5:29
10.	"The Best One Yet (The Boy)"	Adams; Pineda; Gomez; David Guetta; Giorgio Tuinfort; Sylvia Gordon; Baptiste	will.i.am; Guetta; Tuinfort	4:25
11.	"Just Can't Get Enough"	Adams; Pineda; Gomez; Ferguson; Alvarez; Stephen Shadowen; Rodney "Darkchild" Jerkins; Julie Frost	will.i.am; Jerkins^{[a]}	3:39
12.	"Play It Loud"	Adams; Michael McHenry; Baptiste	Free School	4:21
Total length:				54:05

Deluxe edition
No.	Title	Writer(s)	Producer(s)	Length
10.	"The Situation"	Adams; Pineda; Ferguson; Ryan Buendia	apl.de.ap; Replay; DJ Ammo	3:45
11.	"The Coming"	Adams; Pineda; Gomez; Baptiste; Alvarez; Barrington Levy; Paul Love	will.i.am	4:19
12.	"Own It"	Adams	will.i.am	3:13
13.	"The Best One Yet (The Boy)"	Adams; Pineda; Gomez; Guetta; Tuinfort; Gordon; Baptiste	will.i.am; Guetta; Tuinfort	4:25
14.	"Just Can't Get Enough"	Adams; Pineda; Gomez; Ferguson; Alvarez; Shadowen; Jerkins; Frost	will.i.am; Jerkins^{[a]}	3:39
15.	"Play It Loud"	Adams; McHenry; Baptiste	Free School	4:21
Total length:				65:22

Super Deluxe edition bonus tracks
No.	Title	Writer(s)	Length
16.	"Everything Wonderful" (featuring David Guetta)	Adams, Baptiste, Guetta, Gomez, Pineda, Tuinfort	4:03
17.	"Phenomenon"	Adams, Alvarez, Baptiste, Ryan Buendia, Ferguson, Pineda	3:40
18.	"Take It Off"	Adams, Gomez, Beleegh Hamdi, Ferguson, Pineda, Hamza Mohamed	4:02
Total length:			77:07

Super Deluxe edition (Disc 2 – The Best of The E.N.D)
No.	Title	Writer(s)	Producer(s)	Length
1.	"Boom Boom Pow"	Adams, Pineda, Ferguson, Gomez	will.i.am, Jean Baptiste*, Poet Name Life*	4:11
2.	"I Gotta Feeling"	Adams, Pineda, Ferguson, Gomez, Guetta, Riesterer	David Guetta, Frédéric Riesterer	4:49
3.	"Meet Me Halfway"	Adams, Pineda, Ferguson, Gomez, Harris, Baptiste, Gordon	Keith Harris, will.i.am	4:44
4.	"Imma Be"	Adams, Pineda, Ferguson, Gomez, Harris, Jared Tankel, Daniel Foder, Thomas Brenneck, Michael Deller	Keith Harris, will.i.am	4:17
5.	"Rock That Body"	Adams, Pineda, Gomez, Ferguson, Guetta, Mark Knight, Adam Walder, Baptiste, Jamie Munson, Robert Ginyard	David Guetta, will.i.am, Mark Knight*, Funkagenda*	4:32
Total length:				22:33

Notes

- ^{^a} signifies a co-producer
- "The Time (Dirty Bit)" interpolates "(I've Had) The Time of My Life," originally performed by Bill Medley and Jennifer Warnes in the 1987 film Dirty Dancing.
- "Light Up the Night" contains a sample of "Children's Story" by Slick Rick.
- "Fashion Beats" contains a sample of "My Forbidden Lover" by Chic.
- "Love You Long Time" contains a sample of "Give It Up" by KC and the Sunshine Band.

== Personnel ==
Credits for The Beginning adapted from Allmusic.

- Stacy Ferguson – vocals
- William Adams – vocals, art direction, bass, drum programming, engineer, executive producer, Fender Rhodes, logo design, Moog bass, producer, synthesizer
- DJ Ammo – drum programming, Moog bass, producer, synthesizer
- Michelle Bishop – violin
- Davis Barnett – viola
- Larry Gold – conductor, string arrangements
- Jaime Gomez (Taboo) – vocals,
- David Guetta – drum programming, producer, synthesizer
- Keith Harris – Fender Rhodes, grand piano, piano, synthesizer
- Alain Whyte – guitar
- Josh Lopez – guitar
- Caleb Speir – bass
- Giorgio Tuinfort – drum programming, producer, synthesizer
- Ghislaine Fleischmann – violin
- Ruth Frazier – viola
- Olga Konopelsky – violin
- Tom Kraines – cello
- Emma Kummrow – violin
- Tamae Lee – violin
- Erica Miller – violin
- Charles Parker – violin
- Gregory Teperman – violin
- Jennie Lorenzo – cello
- Deborah Mannis - Gardner – sample clearance
- Allan Pineda – vocals
- Eddie Axley – logo design
- Chris Bellman – mastering
- Jennifer Bowling – marketing coordinator
- Dennis Dennehy – publicity
- William Derella – management
- Dylan Dresdow – mixing
- Free School – producer
- Julie Hovsepian – product manager
- Tomoko Itoki – marketing
- Neil Jacobson – A&R
- Justin Franks (DJ Frank E) – producer
- Rodney "Darkchild" Jerkins – producer
- Andy Kalyvas – mastering assistant
- Jonathan Levine – booking
- Polo Molina – management
- Huan Nghiem – art direction
- Padraic 'Padlock' Kerin – engineer, production coordination
- Brenda Reynoso – publicity
- Dante Santiago – A&R
- James Durkin – recording assistant
- Pasha Shapiro – art direction
- Hillary Siskind – publicity
- David Sonenberg – management
- Anthony Taglianetti – mixing assistant
- Scott Thomas – booking
- Andrew Van Meter – producer
- Jorge Velasco – mixing assistant
- Ernst Weber – art direction
- Ianthe Zevos – creation

== Charts ==
=== Weekly charts ===
Weekly chart performance for The Beginning
Chart (2010–2011)	Peak position
Australian Albums (ARIA)	8
Austrian Albums (Ö3 Austria)	7
Belgian Albums (Ultratop Flanders)	6
Belgian Albums (Ultratop Wallonia)	2
Canadian Albums (Billboard)	2
Czech Albums (ČNS IFPI)	18
Dutch Albums (Album Top 100)	34
French Albums (SNEP)	1
German Albums (Offizielle Top 100)	2
Greek Albums (IFPI)	7
Hungarian Albums (MAHASZ)	34
Irish Albums (IRMA)	13
Italian Albums (FIMI)	25
Japanese Albums (Oricon)	10
Mexican Albums (Top 100 Mexico)	2
New Zealand Albums (RMNZ)	12
Polish Albums (ZPAV)	27
Scottish Albums (Official Charts)	7
Spanish Albums (Promusicae)	17
Swedish Albums (Sverigetopplistan)	58
Swiss Albums (Schweizer Hitparade)	3
Swiss Romandie Albums (Schweizer Hitparade)	1
UK Albums (Official Charts)	8
UK Dance Albums (Official Charts)	1
US Billboard 200	6

=== Year-end charts ===
2010 year-end chart performance for The Beginning
Chart (2010)	Position
Australian Albums (ARIA)	42
Belgian Albums (Ultratop Wallonia)	81
French Albums (SNEP)	17
German Albums (Offizielle Top 100)	52
Mexican Albums (Top 100 Mexico)	29
Swiss Albums (Schweizer Hitparade)	78
UK Albums (OCC)	46

2011 year-end chart performance for The Beginning
Chart (2011)	Position
Australian Albums (ARIA)	57
Austrian Albums (Ö3 Austria)	45
Belgian Albums (Ultratop Flanders)	21
Belgian Albums (Ultratop Wallonia)	8
Canadian Albums (Billboard)	4
French Albums (SNEP)	6
German Albums (Offizielle Top 100)	52
Mexican Albums (Top 100 Mexico)	12
Swiss Albums (Schweizer Hitparade)	18
UK Albums (OCC)	111
US Billboard 200	27

== Certifications ==
Certifications and sales for The Beginning
Region	Certification	Certified units/sales
Australia (ARIA)	Platinum	70,000^{^}
Austria (IFPI Austria)	Gold	10,000^{*}
Belgium (BRMA)	Platinum	30,000^{*}
Brazil (Pro-Música Brasil)	Gold	20,000^{*}
France (SNEP)	Diamond	500,000^{*}
Germany (BVMI)	Gold	100,000^{^}
Ireland (IRMA)	Platinum	15,000^{^}
Italy (FIMI)	Gold	30,000^{*}
Japan (RIAJ)	Gold	100,000^{^}
Mexico (AMPROFON)	Platinum	60,000^{^}
New Zealand (RMNZ)	2× Platinum	30,000^{‡}
Switzerland (IFPI Switzerland)	Platinum	30,000^{^}
United Kingdom (BPI)	Platinum	300,000^{^}
United States (RIAA)	Platinum	1,000,000^{‡}
Summaries
Europe (IFPI)	Platinum	1,000,000^{*}
^{*} Sales figures based on certification alone.^{^} Shipments figures based on certification alone.^{‡} Sales+streaming figures based on certification alone.

== Release history ==
List of release dates, showing country, record label, and edition
Region	Date	Label	Edition
Australia	November 26, 2010	Universal Music	Standard; Deluxe
Germany	November 26, 2010	Universal Music	Standard; Deluxe
Argentina	November 26, 2010	Universal Music	Deluxe
Poland	November 26, 2010	Universal Music	Standard; Deluxe
United Kingdom	November 29, 2010	Polydor	Standard; Deluxe; Super Deluxe
France	November 29, 2010	Polydor	Standard; Deluxe; Super Deluxe
Hong Kong	November 29, 2010	Universal Music	Standard; Deluxe; Super Deluxe
Mexico	November 30, 2010	Interscope	Standard; Deluxe; Super Deluxe
Greece	November 30, 2010	Interscope	Standard; Deluxe; Super Deluxe
United States	November 30, 2010	Interscope	Standard; Deluxe; Super Deluxe
Italy	November 30, 2010	Interscope	Standard; Deluxe; Super Deluxe
Japan	December 1, 2010	Universal Music	Deluxe; Super Deluxe (Limited)
Colombia	December 1, 2010	Universal Music	Deluxe; Super Deluxe (Limited)
Brazil	December 3, 2010	Universal Music	Deluxe; Super Deluxe (Limited)
