= Just Can't Get Enough (Black Eyed Peas song) =

2011 single by The Black Eyed Peas

Single by the Black Eyed Peas

from the album The Beginning
- Released: February 8, 2011
- Genre: Techno
- Length: 3:39
- Label: Interscope
- Songwriters: William Adams; Allan Pineda; Jaime Gomez; Stacy Ferguson; Joshua Alvarez; Stephen Shadowen; Rodney Jerkins; Julie Frost
- Producers: will.i.am; Jerkins; DJ Ammo; Tommy Brown

The Black Eyed Peas singles chronology
| "The Time (Dirty Bit)" (2010) | "Just Can't Get Enough" (2011) | "Don't Stop the Party" (2011) |

Music video
- "Just Can't Get Enough" on YouTube

"Just Can't Get Enough" is a song by American group Black Eyed Peas, who also co-wrote it, along with Joshua Alvarez, Stephen Shadowen, Rodney "Darkchild" Jerkins, and Julie Frost, for the group's sixth studio album, The Beginning (2010). It was announced on January 21, 2011, as the album's second single and was released on February 8.

The song has been a success on the charts, reaching the top-five in many countries, such as New Zealand, Australia, Greece, France, United Kingdom and the United States, among others. The accompanying music video was filmed in Japan a week before the 2011 Tōhoku earthquake and tsunami. As of June 2011, the single has sold more than 2,462,000 digital units in the US.

== Background and composition ==
The Beginning's second single was announced on Black Eyed Peas' official website on January 21, 2011.

Rodney Jerkins and Julie Frost composed the basis of the song together, with Jerkins on piano and Frost contributing the lyrics and topline melody. Jerkins' production team, composed of Tommy Brown and Jabbar "Bah" Stevens, then worked on the producing the track and contributing to the music composition before will.i.am and Black Eyed Peas; in the words of Frost, the latter "cut it up and gave it their own twist".

Member apl.de.ap told Beatweek Magazine that he wanted the song to be the follow-up to "The Time (Dirty Bit)", because "It's a different tempo and it's also paying homage to the ladies".

Group member Taboo explained the meaning of the song to MTV News as: "The message is knowing that when you're gone from somebody, especially when you're on tour, you can't get enough of them or you're just thinking about them and you just want to let them know that you're always there for them".

== Critical reception ==
Andy Gill from The Independent said, positively, that: "other highlights include "Just Can't Get Enough" – not the Depeche Mode song – which vaults suddenly from the rare dignity of string-synth textures to a sweatily pumping techno finale". Lewis Corner from Digital Spy rated it three stars (out of five) and commented that: "The back-and-forth production – reminiscent of vintage arcade game Pong – comprises electronic synths and soft strings teamed with heavy beats and, of course, the obligatory vocoded 'mega switch up' – prompting its transformation into a thumping techno endgame. Throw in some 'LOL' text lingo and computerised vocals, and we can't help but think he's perhaps spent a little too much time in front of the PC for this one. You want to be careful Will, we hear they make your eyes go square".

== Music video ==
The music video for "Just Can't Get Enough" was directed by Ben Mor. It was shot over a three-day period in Tokyo, Japan primarily in the Ginza and Shibuya districts while the group was on a press tour. The opening clips show shots of the Ginza district. The video was shot between March 3–5, 2011, just one week before the 2011 Tōhoku earthquake and tsunami. In an interview with Entertainment Tonight, Fergie spoke of the clip and the natural disaster in Japan, saying, "It was the easiest video I ever shot because it was us living our lives. I love that it's showing a true perspective of how it can sometimes be lonely on the road away from our loved ones. It also demonstrates the love and connection we have with Japan. Our heart goes out to all of the Japanese people who have been affected by this natural disaster." Taboo was also quoted saying "It was an amazing moment in time because Japan has always been my favorite place on the planet. It was great to do our video there. God bless the Japanese. Our love goes out to them."

Tokyo, where the music video was filmed.

The video premiered on March 16, 2011, on music video website Vevo. It opens with the translator voice tells the caption "This video was filmed in Japan one week before the earthquake and tsunami. Our thoughts and prayers go out to all the people of Japan. We love you." It was shot in a guerrilla-style. Fergie is seen overlooking the city from her suite in The Peninsula Tokyo, will.i.am is in the back of a car. Taboo sings his verse while walking in the Shibuya district and apl.de.ap sings his "switched up" verse in front of a futuristic backdrop with flashing lights. It also includes vignettes of Tokyo's nightlife, such as young club-goers taking photos with mobile phones and the city's rail system. At a couple points, it shows all four members wearing different styles of sunglasses and dressed in black performing at a nightclub. The clip closes with the translator voice with a message to encourage viewers to donate to the Red Cross.

The video received positive reviews from critics. Bill Lamb of About.com wrote that "The feel ... was already a bit melancholy depicting the loneliness and separation of being on the road. However, the fact that the clip was filmed in Tokyo, Japan just a week before the recent devastating earthquake gives the video even more depth and poignance." Becky Bain of Idolator wrote that "It's basically Lost in Translation with a more thumping soundtrack."

== Live performances ==
Black Eyed Peas performed the song for the first time on the tenth season of American Idol on March 17, 2011. The performance began with will.i.am, wearing a white suit and playing on the piano and dedicating the song to Japan. Fergie then opened the song while sitting atop the piano wearing a white halter dress. Later, will.i.am stood up and joined her on stage to sing his lines. apl.de.ap and Taboo, also wearing white clothing, sang and rapped along. Behind them, string players and dancers performed, and couples acted out skits. Near the end, the group jumped around on stage, while encouraging the audience to dance and clap along. They also performed "Just Can't Get Enough" at the Nickelodeon Kids' Choice Awards 2011 and in the show that they performed for MTV World Stage. On December 11, 2019, they again performed "Just Can't Get Enough" at the closing ceremony of the 2019 Southeast Asian Games at the New Clark City Athletics Stadium in Philippines.

== Track listing ==
- Digital download
1. "Just Can't Get Enough" – 3:40
- German CD single
1. "Just Can't Get Enough" – 3:40
2. "Just Can't Get Enough" (Instrumental) – 3:48
- French CD single
1. "Just Can't Get Enough" – 3:40
2. "The Time (Dirty Bit)" (Zedd remix) – 6:00

== Credits and personnel ==
- Vocals – will.i.am, apl.de.ap, Taboo, Fergie
- Songwriting – will.i.am, apl.de.ap, Taboo, Fergie, Joshua Alvarez, Stephen Shadowen, Rodney Jerkins, Julie Frost
- Production – will.i.am, DJ Ammo, Rodney "Darkchild" Jerkins
- Conducting & Arrangement – Larry Gold
- Violins – Emma Kummrow, Olga Konopelsky, Gislaine Fleischmann, Charles Parker, Michelle Bishop, Gregory Teperman, Tamae Lee & Erica Miller
- Violas – Davis Barnett & Ruth Frazier
- Cello – Jennie Lorenzo Tom Kraines
- Drum programming, Fender Rhodes, synthesizers, Moog Bass – will.i.am
- Drum programming, synthesizers – Dj Ammo

== Charts ==
=== Weekly charts ===
Weekly chart performance
| Chart (2011) | Peak position |
|---|---|
| Australia (ARIA) | 3 |
| Austria (Ö3 Austria Top 40) | 2 |
| Belgium (Ultratop 50 Flanders) | 6 |
| Belgium (Ultratop 50 Wallonia) | 2 |
| Brazil (Billboard Hot Pop Songs) | 1 |
| Canada Hot 100 (Billboard) | 5 |
| CIS Airplay (TopHit) | 8 |
| Czech Republic Airplay (ČNS IFPI) | 1 |
| Denmark (Tracklisten) | 31 |
| Finland (Suomen virallinen lista) | 9 |
| France (SNEP) | 1 |
| Germany (GfK) | 9 |
| Hungary (Rádiós Top 40) | 12 |
| Ireland (IRMA) | 7 |
| Italy (FIMI) | 5 |
| Mexico Anglo Airplay (Monitor Latino) | 2 |
| Netherlands (Dutch Top 40) | 13 |
| Netherlands (Single Top 100) | 11 |
| New Zealand (Recorded Music NZ) | 4 |
| Poland Dance (ZPAV) | 35 |
| Portugal Digital Song Sales (Billboard) | 9 |
| Russia Airplay (TopHit) | 5 |
| Scottish Singles Sales (Official Charts) | 4 |
| Slovakia Airplay (ČNS IFPI) | 2 |
| Spain (Promusicae) | 16 |
| Sweden (Sverigetopplistan) | 20 |
| Switzerland (Schweizer Hitparade) | 3 |
| Ukraine Airplay (TopHit) | 196 |
| UK Dance (Official Charts) | 1 |
| UK Singles (Official Charts) | 3 |
| US Billboard Hot 100 | 3 |
| US Adult Pop Airplay (Billboard) | 11 |
| US Pop Airplay (Billboard) | 2 |
| US Rhythmic Airplay (Billboard) | 3 |

=== Year-end charts ===
2011 year-end chart performance
| Chart (2011) | Position |
|---|---|
| Australia (ARIA) | 22 |
| Austria (Ö3 Austria Top 40) | 33 |
| Belgium (Ultratop 50 Flanders) | 35 |
| Belgium (Ultratop 50 Wallonia) | 16 |
| Brazil (Crowley) | 23 |
| Canada (Canadian Hot 100) | 19 |
| France (SNEP) | 5 |
| Germany (Official German Charts) | 49 |
| Greece (IFPI) | 76 |
| Italy (Musica e dischi) | 31 |
| Netherlands (Dutch Top 40) | 81 |
| Netherlands (Single Top 100) | 73 |
| New Zealand (Recorded Music NZ) | 37 |
| Russia Airplay (TopHit) | 18 |
| Sweden (Sverigetopplistan) | 76 |
| Switzerland (Schweizer Hitparade) | 32 |
| Ukraine Airplay (TopHit) | 177 |
| UK Singles (Official Charts) | 42 |
| US Billboard Hot 100 | 10 |
| US Adult Top 40 (Billboard) | 36 |
| US Mainstream Top 40 (Billboard) | 7 |
| US Rhythmic (Billboard) | 20 |

2012 year-end chart performance
| Chart (2012) | Position |
|---|---|
| Russia Airplay (TopHit) | 124 |

== Certifications ==
Certifications and sales
| Region | Certification | Certified units/sales |
|---|---|---|
| Australia (ARIA) | 3× Platinum | 210,000^{^} |
| Belgium (BRMA) | Gold | 15,000^{*} |
| Brazil (Pro-Música Brasil) | Diamond | 250,000^{‡} |
| Denmark (IFPI Danmark) | Gold | 45,000^{‡} |
| France (SNEP) | Gold | 150,000^{*} |
| Germany (BVMI) | Gold | 150,000^{‡} |
| Italy (FIMI) | Platinum | 30,000^{*} |
| New Zealand (RMNZ) | 3× Platinum | 90,000^{‡} |
| Spain (Promusicae) | Gold | 30,000^{‡} |
| Sweden (GLF) | Platinum | 40,000^{‡} |
| Switzerland (IFPI Switzerland) | Platinum | 30,000^{^} |
| United Kingdom (BPI) | Platinum | 600,000^{‡} |
^{*} Sales figures based on certification alone.^{^} Shipments figures based on certification alone.^{‡} Sales+streaming figures based on certification alone.

== Release history ==
Release dates and formats
| Region | Date | Format(s) | Label(s) | Ref. |
|---|---|---|---|---|
| United States | February 8, 2011 | Contemporary hit radio | Interscope | |
| Germany | February 25, 2011 | CD | Universal Music | |
| France | April 11, 2011 | CD | Polydor | |
