= Black Eyed Peas =

American pop music group

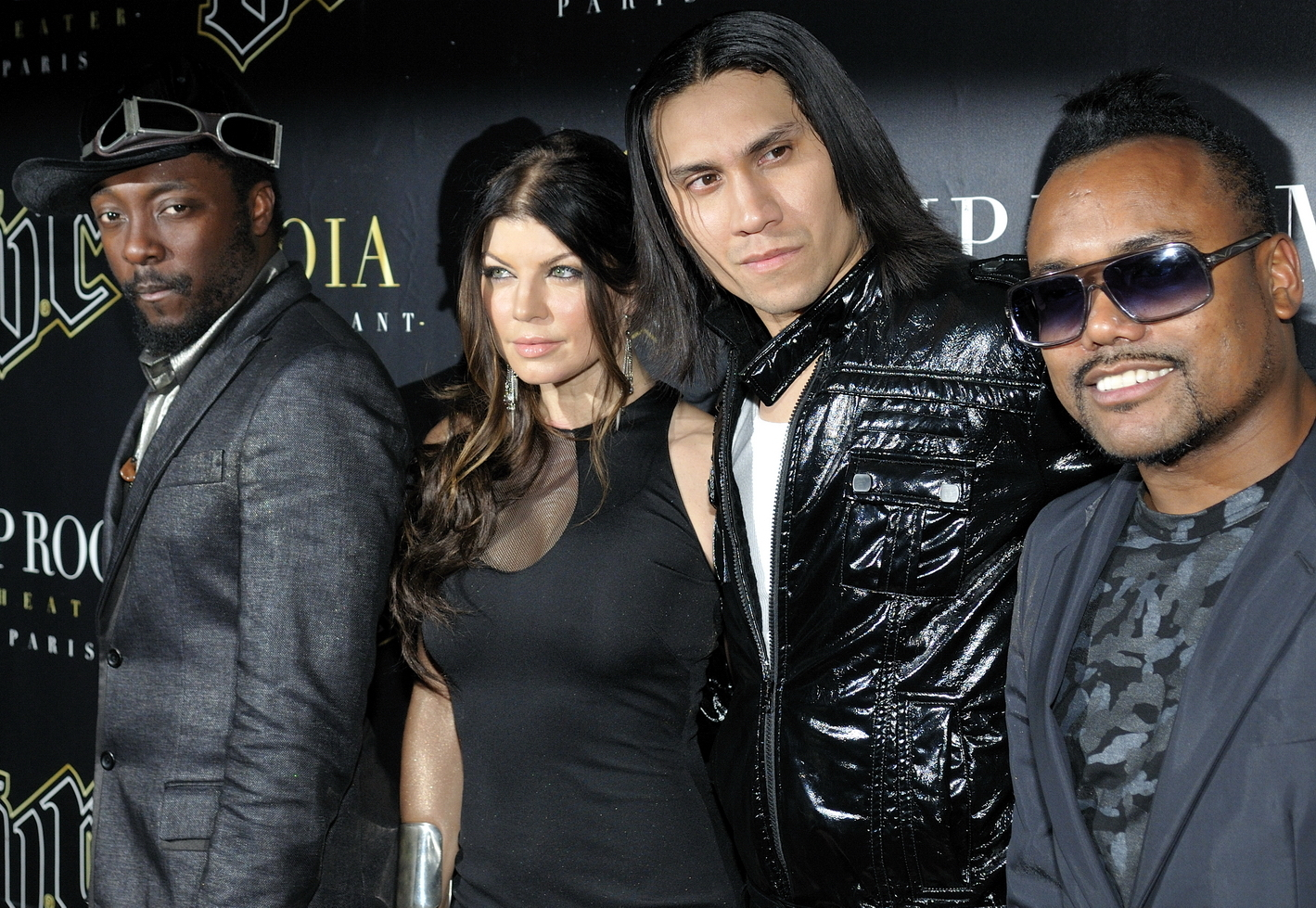
- Black Eyed Peas in 2009. From left: will.i.am, Fergie, Taboo, and apl.de.ap

Background information
- Also known as: Atban Klann (1992–1995); Black Eyed Pods (1995); The Black Eyed Peas (2003–2017)
- Origin: Los Angeles, California
- Genres: Hip-hop; pop rap; alternative hip-hop; dance-pop; R&B; electropop
- Works: Black Eyed Peas discography
- Years active: 1992–2011; 2015–present
- Labels: Ruthless; Interscope; will.i.am; A&M; Epic
- Members: will.i.am; apl.de.ap; Taboo
- Past members: Dante Santiago; Mookie Mook; DJ Motiv8; Fergie
- Website: blackeyedpeas.com

Black Eyed Peas are an American musical group formed in Los Angeles in 1992, composed of rappers will.i.am, apl.de.ap and Taboo. Fergie was a member of the group during the height of their popularity in the 2000s, and left the group in 2017. They have sold an estimated 80 million records, making them one of the best-selling musical acts of all time; they were ranked 12th on Billboard's 2000s Decade-End Artist of the Decade Chart and 7th on the Hot 100 Artists of the Decade.

Originally forming as an alternative hip hop trio, they signed with Interscope Records to release two albums—Behind the Front (1998) and Bridging the Gap (2000)—before rebranding to a more marketable pop-rap act; their third album, Elephunk (2003), yielded the group's mainstream breakthrough. Its lead single, "Where Is the Love?" (featuring Justin Timberlake), peaked atop music charts in 13 countries, including the United Kingdom, where it spent seven weeks at number one and became the country's biggest-selling single of that year. Their fourth album, Monkey Business (2005), was met with continued commercial success; it received triple platinum certification by the Recording Industry Association of America (RIAA) and peaked at number two on the Billboard 200.

The group's fifth album, The E.N.D. (2009), yielded their furthest commercial success; it peaked atop the Billboard 200 and spawned three Billboard Hot 100-number one singles: "Imma Be", "Boom Boom Pow" and "I Gotta Feeling". For one week, the latter two songs made the group one of the 11 musical acts to have simultaneously held the top two spots on the Billboard Hot 100, where they remained for a then-record 26 consecutive weeks. Two other singles from the album, "Rock That Body" and "Meet Me Halfway", peaked within the top ten of the chart. "I Gotta Feeling" became the first single to sell over one million downloads in the United Kingdom. At the 52nd Grammy Awards ceremony, the group won three awards from six nominations. The group's sixth album, The Beginning (2010), released the following year, and spawned the Billboard Hot 100-top five singles "The Time (Dirty Bit)" and "Just Can't Get Enough". In February 2011, they performed in the Super Bowl XLV halftime show.

In 2011, the Black Eyed Peas announced they would be going on indefinite hiatus to pursue other activities, briefly reuniting in 2015. Fergie was announced to have left the group in 2018, and J. Rey Soul joined the group as a touring member that same year. Soul also appeared as a featured artist on select tracks on the group's seventh album, Masters of the Sun Vol. 1 (2018). They followed this with the albums Translation (2020) and Elevation (2022), which delved into reggaeton and Latin influences.

== History ==
=== 1988–2001: Formation, Behind the Front and Bridging the Gap ===
In 1988, while attending two different high schools, William James Adams Jr and Allan Pineda Lindo met at the all-ages dance venue Club What? in Los Angeles. They formed a hip-hop dance and music crew named Tribal Nation. Adams took the stage name Will 1X while Pineda Lindo adopted the name apl.de.ap. Their friends joined the group – Dante Santiago and Mooky Mook, followed shortly by DJ Motiv8. Actor David Faustino opened an all-ages club named Balistyx in 1991 inside the old Whisky a Go Go, and Tribal Nation played there. Rapper Eazy-E caught their show and signed the group to Ruthless Records, changing the group name to Atban Klann. They released a promotional single "Puddles of H2O" in 1994 and was meant to be commercially available March 1995 along with the full album titled "Grass Roots" the following month on April 4 of the same year (originally meant for an October 1994 release before a delay), billed as being produced by the production team of DJ Motiv8 and Will 1X. Their album was shelved around the start of 1995, never to be released. Mooky Mook left the group, and Eazy-E died of HIV/AIDS. The group's contract with Ruthless was stalled, so Santiago also left the group. Will 1X changed his stage name to will.i.am.

will.i.am and apl.de.ap rebranded as the Black Eyed Pods with Jaime Gomez (Taboo) as an official member, and Kim Hill, a singer who performed live with the group and on a number of tracks. They later changed "Pods" to "Peas". Unlike the "gangsta rap" sounds of Los Angeles-based hip hop acts at the time, the trio performed with a live band and adopted a conscious musical style and appearance. After being signed to Interscope Records and releasing their debut, Behind the Front (1998) the group (and their accompanying live band) earned critical acclaim. One of the singles from the album was "Joints & Jam", and was featured on the Bulworth soundtrack. Singer Sierra Swan appeared as a guest on the 1998 song "Fallin' Up". Their second album, Bridging the Gap (2000), produced the singles "Weekends" featuring Esthero and "Request + Line" featuring R&B singer Macy Gray. Hill left the band while producing the album, but was still featured on the album tracks for "Hot" and "Tell Your Mama Come" as well as in the video for "Weekends".

=== 2002–2008: Addition of Fergie, Elephunk and Monkey Business ===
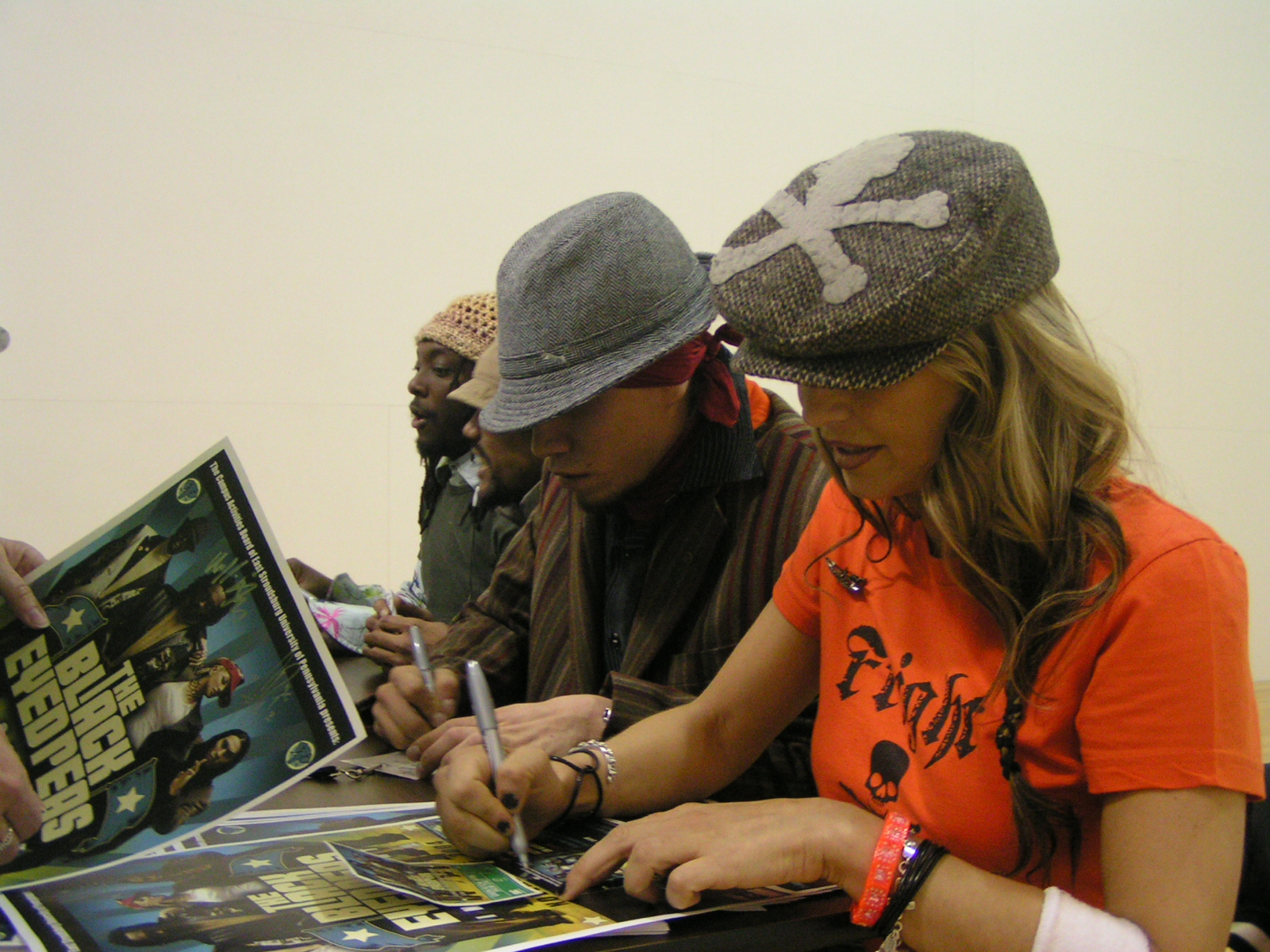
The Black Eyed Peas signing autographs in 2004

In 2002, Stacy Ferguson was chosen as the lead singer, after being introduced to the band by Santiago. Their new album, Elephunk, indicated a shift to a polished pop sound designed to attract mass audiences. In a positive review of the Black Eyed Peas' new-found style, Rolling Stone noted that after the group "hired a blond bombshell named Stacy 'Fergie' Ferguson and gave up their pursuit of backpack-rapper cred, they have made a kind of spiritual practice of recording futuristic songs – a total aesthetic commitment that extends from their garish wardrobes to their United Colors of Benetton worldview."

From Elephunk came "Where Is the Love?", which became the Black Eyed Peas' first major hit, peaking at No. 8 on the U.S. Hot 100. It was more successful abroad, topping the charts in several other countries, including seven weeks at No. 1 in the United Kingdom, where it became the biggest-selling single of 2003. The single had similar results in Australia, staying at No. 1 for six weeks. The album subsequently spawned "Shut Up", which peaked at No. 2 in the UK and topped the charts and went gold and platinum in the U.S., UK, Germany, and other European markets. The third single from the album, although significantly restyled from the original Elephunk version, "Hey Mama" hit the top 5 in Australia and the top 10 in the UK, Germany and other European countries and reached No. 23 in the U.S. The song received even more exposure in 2003 when it was featured in the first "silhouette" television commercial for the iPod. The fourth single from the album was "Let's Get It Started". It won a 2005 Grammy for Best Rap Performance by a Duo or Group and also received two nominations for Record of the Year and Best Rap Song. In 2004, the Black Eyed Peas embarked on their international Elephunk Tour, touring many countries in Europe, Africa, and Asia.

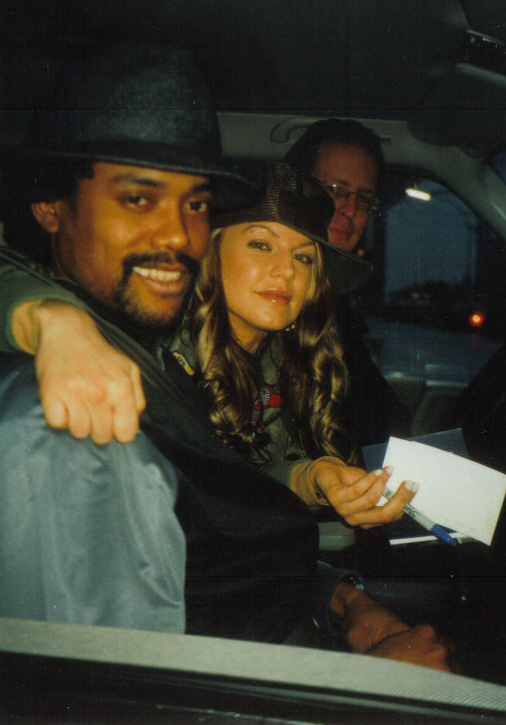
The Black Eyed Peas' apl.de.ap and Fergie in 2005

Their fourth album, Monkey Business, was recorded through 2004 and was released on May 25, 2005. Much of the pre-production writing was performed on the John Lennon Educational Tour Bus while on the Black Eyed Peas tour of 2004. The album's first single, "Don't Phunk with My Heart", was a hit in the U.S., reaching number three on the Billboard Hot 100 and earned them another Grammy for Best Rap Performance by a Duo or Group. The song reached three in the UK, and five in Canada, and stayed at number one for three weeks in Australia. "Don't Lie", the second single from the album, saw success on the U.S. Hot 100, reaching No. 14, although becoming somewhat more successful in the UK and Australia, reaching a peak of No. 6 in both countries. "My Humps", another song from the album, reached number three on the U.S. Hot 100 and number one in Australia. However, many mocked the song for its lyrical content. John Bush, writing for AllMusic, described it as "one of the most embarrassing rap performances of the new millennium". Monkey Business debuted at number two on the U.S. Billboard 200 albums chart, selling over 295,000 copies in its first week and was later certified 3× platinum by the RIAA. The final single from the album was "Pump It", which peaked at number 8 in Australia and number 18 in the U.S.

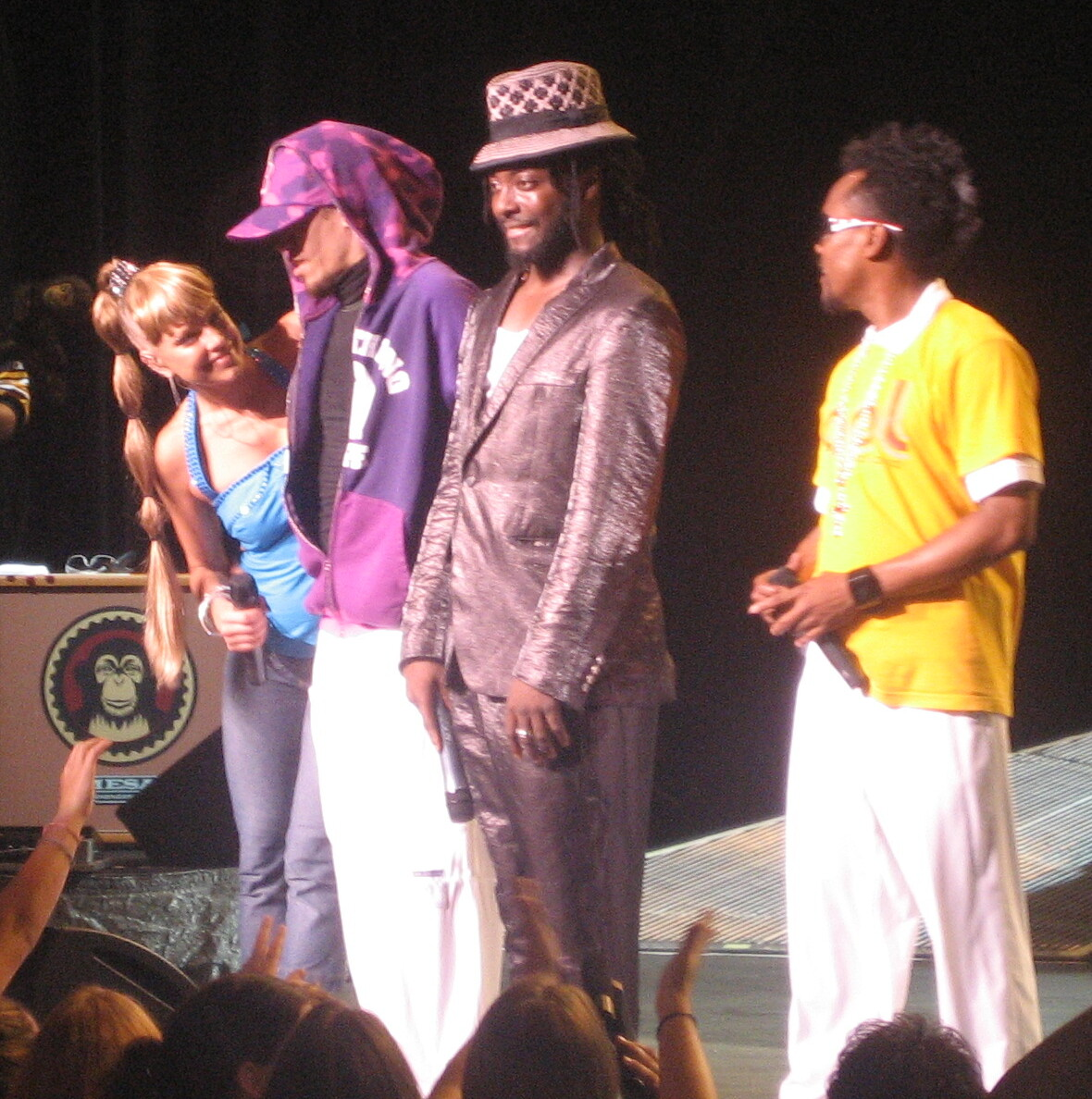
The Black Eyed Peas performing on August 24, 2006

In September 2005, the Black Eyed Peas released an iTunes Originals playlist of their greatest hits, as well as some that were re-recorded specially available for purchase through iTunes. It has small stories containing info and commentary about the songs and how the group first met. In Autumn 2005, the Black Eyed Peas set off to tour with Gwen Stefani as a supporting act. In December 2005, they embarked on the "European Tour", which toured multiple countries in Europe. The European leg which opened in Tel Aviv, Israel, continued onto Ireland, the UK, France and Germany. After heading to Europe and Asia, they toured the U.S. again. The tour concluded in South America. In addition to touring, the Black Eyed Peas also headlined the halftime show at the Grey Cup on November 27, 2005.

The Black Eyed Peas starred in a series of web shorts for Snickers, called Instant Def, appearing as a group of hip-hop superheroes. On March 21, 2006, the Black Eyed Peas released a remix album, titled Renegotiations: The Remixes to iTunes. In March 2006, the Black Eyed Peas hit the road again as the featured headliner for the 6th Annual Honda Civic Tour with supporting bands Flipsyde and the Pussycat Dolls. They again brought the John Lennon Educational Tour Bus on the tour with them to craft new songs for Fergie's solo debut album. In 2006, they went on tour with the Pussycat Dolls.

In 2007, the Black Eyed Peas embarked on the Black Blue & You World Tour, visiting more than 20 countries. This tour was presented by Pepsi, in conjunction with the new "Pepsi More" advertising campaign, featuring the Black Eyed Peas. They recorded the song "More" for the new Pepsi spot. On December 31, 2006, the tour concluded at Ipanema Beach in Rio de Janeiro, Brazil. The Black Eyed Peas performed at the UK leg of Live Earth on July 7, 2007, at Wembley Stadium, London. They headlined the main Ocean Stage at the Summer Sonic Festival in Tokyo, Japan on August 11, and in Osaka, Japan on August 12, 2007.

=== 2009–2011: The E.N.D, The Beginning and hiatus ===
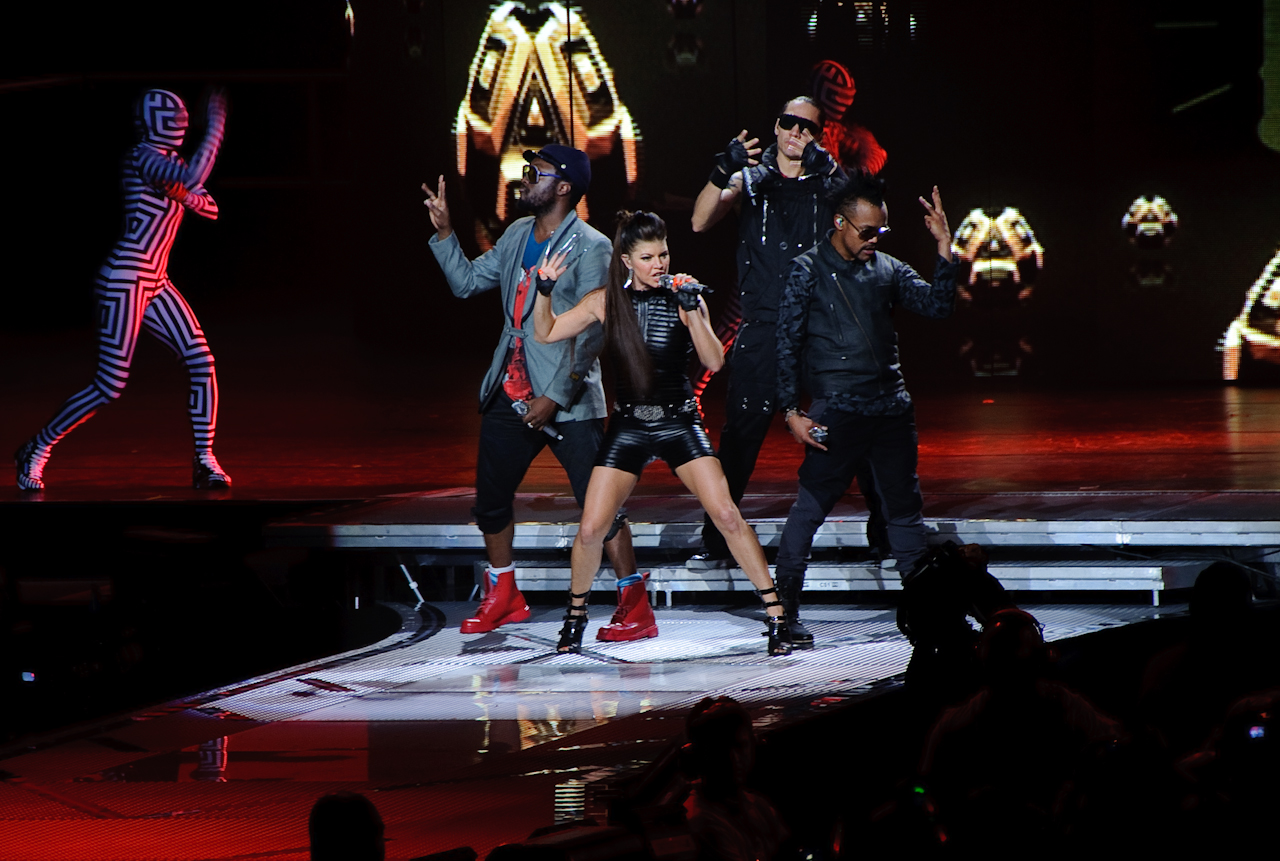
The Black Eyed Peas performing on October 7, 2009

The group's fifth studio album, The E.N.D, title that stands for "The Energy Never Dies", was released on June 3, 2009. The album has a more electronic influence than their previous albums, which will.i.am said was inspired by the Presets' "My People". In its first week, the album sold 304,000 copies and debuted at number 1 on the Billboard 200. In the United States, the album became the ninth album to top the one million mark in sales in 2009. The album spent 38 weeks within the top 10 of the Billboard 200. The E.N.D was the 7th-bestselling album of 2009 in the U.S. It also debuted at number one in Australia, number two in New Zealand and three in the United Kingdom.

The first single "Boom Boom Pow" was released on March 30, 2009, in the U.S. on iTunes. The single sold 465,000 downloads in its first week of digital release, the third-largest number of download sales in a single week overall, and the largest single-week and debut-download totals by a group in the history of digital-download sales, reaching No. 1 on the U.S. The single also reached the top spot in Billboard Hot 100 and Pop 100. being the group's first U.S. No. 1, holding the spot for twelve consecutive weeks. It also reached number 1 in Australia, Canada, and the UK. On May 21, the Black Eyed Peas released "I Gotta Feeling" as the second single from the album. The single charted at number three and then went to number one on the UK Singles Chart. It debuted at number 2 on the Billboard Hot 100 behind "Boom Boom Pow" and later surpassed it, taking the number 1 spot. The Black Eyed Peas joined a group of artists who have held the No. 1 and No. 2 spots on the Billboard Hot 100 simultaneously. From April 18, 2009, when "Boom Boom Pow" reached No. 1, through October 10, 2009, the last week "I Gotta Feeling" was at No. 1, the group was on top of the chart for 26 weeks, more consecutive weeks than any other artist.

On July 30, 2009, Billboard announced that the Black Eyed Peas set a record for the longest successive No. 1 chart run by a duo or group in the Billboard Hot 100's history. "I Gotta Feeling" hit its fifth consecutive week at No. 1, following 12 weeks at the top by the Peas' "Boom Boom Pow". "Meet Me Halfway" was released as the third single from the album in September 2009. The single reached number one in the UK and Australia. It also peaked at seven on the U.S. Billboard Hot 100. "Imma Be" was released as the fourth single in the U.S. on December 15, 2009, reaching number one on the Billboard Hot 100 for two weeks. "Imma Be" to reached number 5 on the Canadian Hot 100. "Rock That Body" was then released as the fifth single, and reached number nine on the Billboard Hot 100.

In September 2009, the group embarked on The E.N.D World Tour. On September 8, 2009, the group performed live for Oprah Winfrey's 24th Season Kickoff Party, on Michigan Avenue in Chicago. An estimated 21,000 dancers in the streets performed a flash mob to the live performance of "I Gotta Feeling". The group performed at the American Music Awards of 2009 with the songs "Meet Me Halfway" and "Boom Boom Pow". They also won 2 out of 3 categories in which they were nominated; Favorite Rock/Pop Group & Favorite R&B/Soul Group. In October 2009, they also were the opening acts for 5 concerts of the U2 360° Tour North America leg. The group performed at the Grammys on January 31, 2010. They performed a mash-up of "Imma Be"/"I Gotta Feeling". They won three awards out of the six nominations, including Best Pop Vocal Album for The E.N.D., Best Pop Vocal Performance by a Group for "I Gotta Feeling", and Best Short Form Video for "Boom Boom Pow".

On March 30, 2010, the Black Eyed Peas were the first group to broadcast a concert live in 3D. In June 2010, the Black Eyed Peas performed at the 2010 FIFA World Cup Kick-Off Celebration concert in South Africa. They also performed at T in the Park 2010. In July 2010, the Black Eyed Peas performed in Central Park as part of Good Morning America's free summer concert series. In December 2010 they appeared on the seventh series of The X Factor in the UK performing "The Time (Dirty Bit)". On July 27, 2010, the Black Eyed Peas released a remix album: The E.N.D. Summer 2010 Canadian Invasion Tour: Remix Collection. It was released on iTunes in Canada only during the Canadian leg of The E.N.D World Tour.

Their sixth studio album, The Beginning, was released on November 26, 2010, and received mixed reviews. The album's first single release was called "The Time (Dirty Bit)",. The music video was directed by Rich Lee. "Just Can't Get Enough", the second single from The Beginning was released on February 18, 2011. Its music video was released on March 16, 2011, and it was filmed in Tokyo. The video was directed by Ben Mor. The group's third single was "Don't Stop the Party" and it was released on May 10, 2011. The video, which is directed by Ben Mor, features on stage and backstage footage of the group during The E.N.D. World Tour and premiered on Vevo on May 12, 2011. On May 22, the group appeared on the 2011 Billboard Music Awards and won one of their four nominations, for "Top Duo/Group".

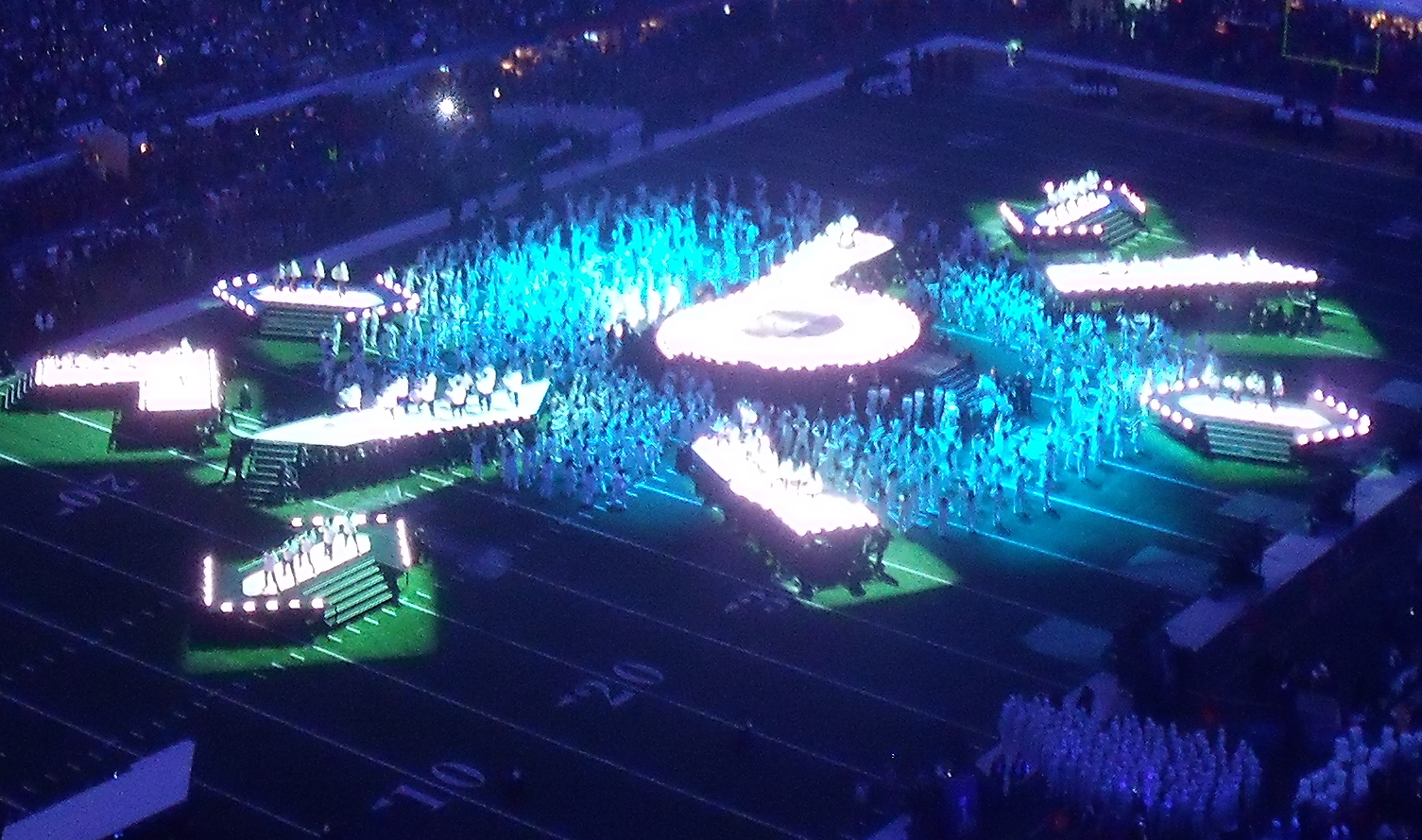
Super Bowl XLV halftime show

On February 6, 2011, the Black Eyed Peas headlined the Super Bowl XLV halftime show. On April 2, 2011, the group appeared on the 24th Annual Nickelodeon Kids' Choice Awards. On July 6, 2011, during a concert at Alton Towers in Staffordshire, the Black Eyed Peas announced they would take an indefinite hiatus following the completion of their tour. On November 23, 2011, the group made their last performance for The Beginning Tour in Miami.

=== 2015–2018: Fergie's departure, addition of J. Rey Soul and Masters of the Sun ===
In January 2015, an interview on Capital Breakfast, will.i.am confirmed that the group would reform that year for their 20th anniversary. The group released two songs that year: "Awesome" and "Yesterday"; the former was included in commercials for the 2015 NBA playoffs. Neither song features contributions from Fergie. On August 31, 2016, the Black Eyed Peas released a new version of their 2003 song "Where Is the Love?", titled "#WHERESTHELOVE". The song, as well as the accompanying video feature all four members of the group, will.i.am, Fergie, apl.de.ap, and Taboo. It is the group's most recent work with Fergie.

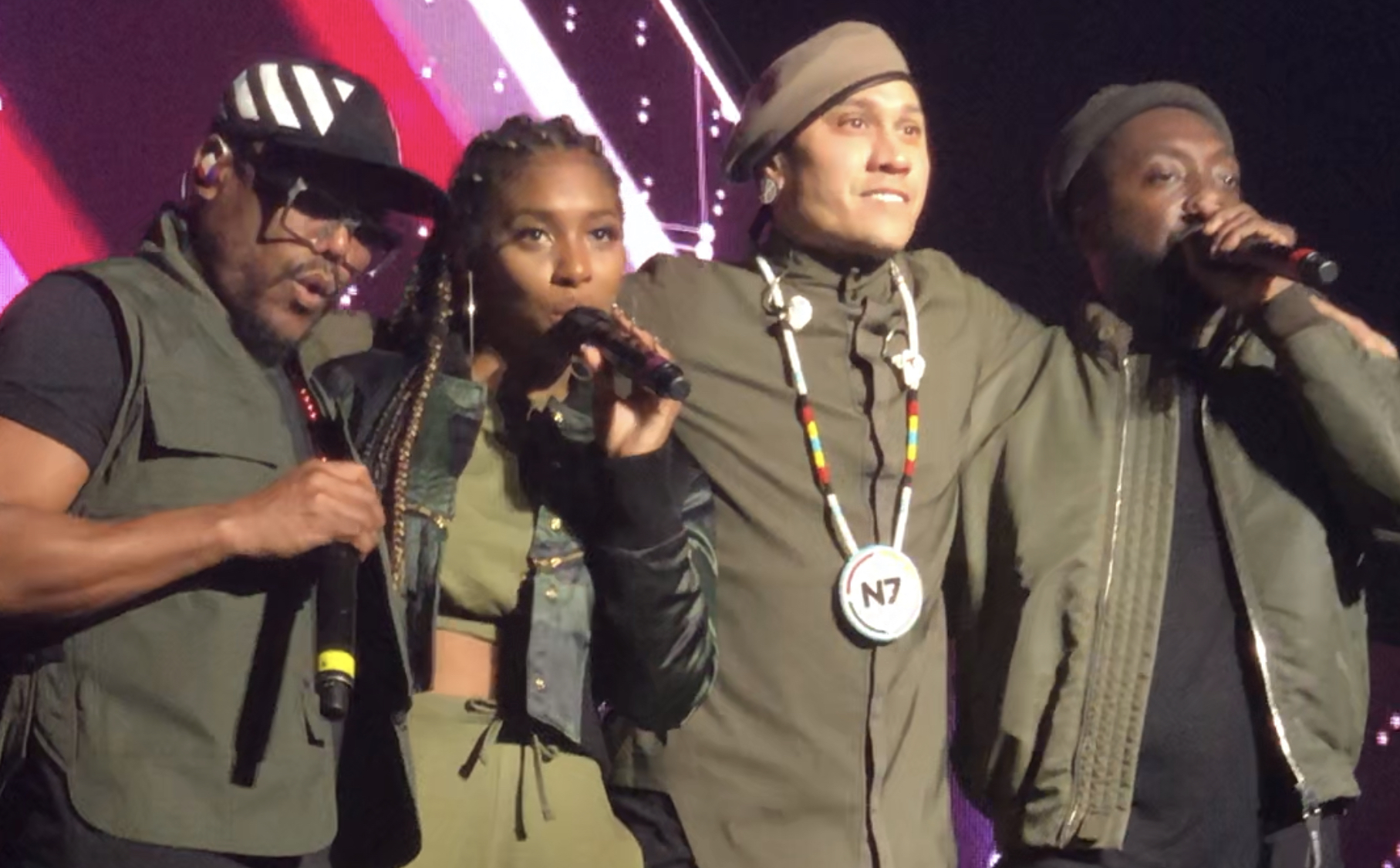
Black Eyed Peas performing with touring member J. Rey Soul in 2018

On June 3, 2017, they performed at the opening ceremony of the 2017 UEFA Champions League Final in the Millennium Stadium, Cardiff, Wales. The performance, which included a pyrotechnic display, ran long and delayed the second-half kickoff by several minutes. The next day, they performed at One Love Manchester, a benefit concert organized by Ariana Grande. On June 4, 2017, a Billboard article rumored that Fergie was departing from the band. will.i.am initially dismissed this, but they announced that she was taking a break from the group to work on her second solo album Double Dutchess, while the remaining members were working on the graphic novel Masters of the Sun. On January 9, 2018, Black Eyed Peas released their first single without Fergie, titled "Street Livin'". On February 18, 2018, will.i.am officially confirmed Fergie's departure in an interview with the Daily Star, also confirming that she would not feature on the group's seventh studio album. The next day, former The Voice of the Philippines season 1 finalist and Team Apl.de.ap member Jessica Reynoso (under the stage name "J. Rey Soul") joined the group as a female vocalist and a "semi-official" member. On May 17, 2018, the Black Eyed Peas released a single called "Ring the Alarm". The single "Get It" was released on July 10, 2018. The music video for "Constant pt. 1 and 2" was released on YouTube on August 30, 2018. The group released a single named "Big Love" on September 12, 2018. The group released another single titled "Dopeness", featuring South Korean rapper CL, on October 25, 2018. Their seventh studio album, Masters of the Sun Vol. 1, was released the following day on October 26. This marked their first album since 2010's The Beginning. In 2018 the Black Eyed Peas performed as part of the pre-game entertainment at the AFL Grand Final.

=== 2019–present: Translation and Elevation ===
The Black Eyed Peas performed in the closing ceremony of the 2019 Southeast Asian Games in the Philippines. The Black Eyed Peas performed in the 93rd Macy's Thanksgiving Day Parade in 2019. They appeared on the NHL float and performed their latest hit "Ritmo." In 2019, the group signed a deal with their new label Epic Records. On October 11, 2019, the group released the song "Ritmo", taken from the Bad Boys for Life soundtrack (2020). The song debuted at number 100 on the US Billboard Hot 100 and became the Black Eyed Peas' 17th Hot 100 entry and their first since 2011's "Don't Stop the Party". "Ritmo" peaked at number 26 on the Hot 100.

On April 10, 2020, the group released the single "Mamacita", which featured J. Rey Soul alongside rapper Ozuna. In an interview with Billboard on May 19, 2020, Reynoso talked about an upcoming eighth album, describing it as "very Afrobeat, Latin vibe, dance – just very uplifting music, which is what we need right now at this time of our life, you know?" On June 11, 2020, the band revealed the tracklist and album title as Translation, with the release date listed as June 19. While promoting the album, will.i.am said that Fergie had stepped back from the group because she wished to devote more time to her role as a mother. will.i.am continued "we're here for her, and she knows how to contact us for a retreat or a breakaway" should she wish to return to the group.

In 2020, the Black Eyed Peas collaborated with Shakira for the first time on the single “Girl Like Me”, a track originally conceived in 2008 and developed intermittently over a twelve‑year period before its release. The group and Shakira later collaborated again on “Don’t You Worry” (2022), marking their second joint project.

On August 30, 2020, the group's performance of "Ritmo" closed the 2020 MTV Video Music Awards. The performance was met with negative reception due to will.i.am., apl.de.ap and Taboo each performing with an illuminated pelvic area. The band was also criticized by longtime fans who were not yet aware of Fergie's previous departure from the group, or J. Rey Soul's membership.

On October 27, 2022, across their social media platforms, the group announced their ninth studio album, titled Elevation, which was released on November 11, 2022. On the Wonderful World of Disney: Magic Holiday Celebration television holiday special which aired on ABC November 27, 2022, the Black Eyed Peas performed "I Gotta Feeling" and "A Cold Christmas".

== Other ventures ==
=== Philanthropy ===
On December 10, 2005, the Black Eyed Peas' cover of the John Lennon classic "Power to the People", which was mostly recorded on the John Lennon Educational Tour Bus, was released by Amnesty International as part of the Make Some Noise campaign to celebrate human rights. The song was later released on the 2007 John Lennon tribute album entitled Instant Karma: The Amnesty International Campaign to Save Darfur.

The Black Eyed Peas dedicated the music video of their 2011 single "Just Can't Get Enough" to Japan, as the country had been hit by an earthquake. The group filmed the music video a week before the earthquake struck. In July 2011, the Black Eyed Peas founded a school for New York teenagers where students of 13–19 years can learn video production and music using professional equipment. The Peapod Foundation, in collaboration with the Adobe Foundation, opened the music academy and media Peapod Adobe Youth Voices in Manhattan on July 19. The school will have its facilities in a building operated by the Urban Arts Partnership, which provides art-school programs for adolescents studying in areas of very low income. Young people will be admitted according to the recommendations of their teachers and their expressions of interest in the subjects taught, such as camera work, editing and graphic design. On September 3, 2011, the group performed a concert in Minot, North Dakota to benefit the victims of the 2011 Souris River flood that damaged over 4,000 homes and displaced over 12,000 people in Minot and along the Souris River. Fergie is married to Minot native, Josh Duhamel. On September 30, 2011, the group performed a free concert, "Chase Presents The Black Eyed Peas and Friends", for over 50,000 people in New York City's Central Park. The event raised over $4 million for the charity.

On August 31, 2016, the Black Eyed Peas' remake of their song, "Where Is the Love?", titled "#WHERESTHELOVE" was released and will.i.am told in an interview that all proceeds raised from the song will go to his "i.am.angel foundation", which funds educational programs and college scholarships in the United States.

=== Media ===
The Black Eyed Peas appeared in the video game The Urbz: Sims in the City, released November 2004. The game features the band as they help the player gain control of the city.

In June 2011, Ubisoft announced they were developing The Black Eyed Peas Experience, a dance video game for Kinect and Wii. On November 11, 2011, the game was released internationally.

== Group members ==
Current members

- will.i.am – vocals, writing, production, keyboards, programming, piano, drums, synths, bass (1992–2011, 2015–present)
- apl.de.ap – vocals, writing, production, keyboards, programming (1992–2011, 2015–present)
- Taboo – vocals, writing (1995–2011, 2015–present)

Former members

- Dante Santiago – vocals (1992–1995)
- Mookie Mook – vocals, synthesizer, guitar (1992–1995)
- DJ Motiv8 – production, samples, programming, turntables (1992–1995)
- Fergie – vocals, writing (2002–2011, 2015–2018)

Current touring and session members

- George Pajon, Jr. – guitar, writing (1999–present)
- Keith Harris – drums, percussion, keyboards, bass, programming, piano, synths, writing, production (2003–present)
- J. Rey Soul – vocals (2018–present)

Former touring and session members

- Dante Santiago – vocals, backing vocals, writing (1995–2015)
- Printz Board – keyboards, bass, trumpet, horns, drums, synths, programming, writing, production (2003–2015)
- Tim "Izo" Orindgreff – saxophone, flute, horns, guitar, writing (2003–2015)
- Kevin Feyen – guitar, writing (1995–1999)
- Mike Fratantuno – bass, writing (1995–2003)
- Terrence Yoshiaka – drums, percussion, writing (1995–2003)
- Brian Lapin – keyboards, writing, production (1995–1999)
- DJ Motiv8 – turntables, production (1995–2001)
- Kim Hill – vocals, writing (1995–2001)

== Discography ==
Studio albums

- Behind the Front (1998)
- Bridging the Gap (2000)
- Elephunk (2003)
- Monkey Business (2005)
- The E.N.D. (2009)
- The Beginning (2010)
- Masters of the Sun Vol. 1 (2018)
- Translation (2020)
- Elevation (2022)

As Atban Klann

- Grass Roots (2020) (Note: originally recorded from 1992 to 1994.)

== Tours ==
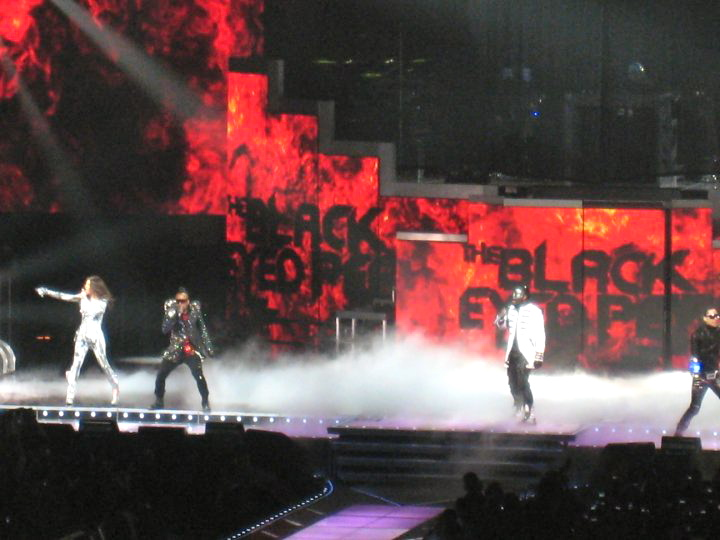
Black Eyed Peas on The E.N.D Tour in tour at Madison Square Garden, 2009

- 1998: Smokin' Grooves 1998
- 1999: SnoCore Tour
- 1999: Vans Warped Tour 1999 (32 dates)
- 2000: Vans Warped Tour 2000 (1 date)
- 2003: The Justified & Stripped Tour (featured for Justin Timberlake and Christina Aguilera)
- 2004: Fly or Die Tour (co-headlined with N.E.R.D.)
- 2004: Elephunk Tour
- 2005: Harajuku Lovers Tour (featured for Gwen Stefani)
- 2005–2006: The Monkey Business Tour
- 2006: Honda Civic Tour
- 2007: Black Blue & You Tour
- 2009: U2 360° Tour (featured for U2, 5 dates)
- 2009–2010: The E.N.D. World Tour
- 2011: The Beginning Massive Stadium Tour
- 2018: Masters of the Sun Tour
- 2023: Elevation

== Comic books ==
- Black Eyed Peas Present: Masters of the Sun ― The Zombie Chronicles No. 1 (2017)

== See also ==
- 2000s in music
- List of artists who reached number one on the UK Singles Downloads Chart
- List of bands from Los Angeles
- List of Billboard Social 50 number-one artists
- List of most-downloaded songs in the United Kingdom

== Notes ==
Preceded by The Tragically Hip	Grey Cup; Halftime Show; 2005	Succeeded by Nelly Furtado
Preceded by The Who	Super Bowl; Halftime Show; 2011; With: Usher & Slash	Succeeded by Madonna
