= Masters of the Sun (comic) =

Comic book series created by The Black Eyed Peas

Black Eyed Peas Present: Masters of the Sun ― The Zombie Chronicles
- Cover to issue #1, art by Damion Scott

Publication information
- Publisher: Marvel Comics
- Format: Ongoing series
- Genre: Superhero
- Publication date: (Vol. 1) August 31, 2017

Creative team
- Written by: will.i.am, Benjamin Jackendoff
- Artist: Damion Scott

Masters of the Sun is a comic book series created by American musical group Black Eyed Peas. The first volume, The Zombie Chronicles, was published on August 31, 2017.

== Plot ==
Masters of the Sun mixes L.A. gang culture, b-boy-ism and Egyptology to tell the tale of a hip-hop group from the Bronx who must battle an ancient, alien god set on controlling the Earth. While on tour in L.A., a zombie outbreak breaks loose when a drug manufactured by the aliens starts turning its users into zombies. The group narrowly escapes the initial outbreak and starts investigating what caused it. While initially hesitant, Lady Nix convinces them that unless they do something, the whole world is doomed.

The story serves as an allegory for the crack epidemic of the 1980s, where the "soulless husk" zombies of the comic stand-in for the people addicted to crack-cocaine. The comic pushes the idea that the epidemic was not random happenstance, but a purposeful agenda orchestrated by the government to keep the black community down.

== Main characters ==
- Zulu X – A rising Hip-Hop star from the Bronx, Zulu X struggles to balance his gang-banger history with his inner morals. He is granted a pair of mystical goggles that let him see through lies and determine the truth of any situation.
- Jimmy Guapo – A wanna be rapper, Jimmy encounters Zulu X and his band when he tries to give them his demo tape. A longtime friend of Lady Nix, in hard times Jimmy's true character shines through his brash demeanor.
- Lady Nix – Owner of the club where Zulu X is performing the night of the zombie outbreak. She took over the club after her father was gunned down by gang members. She believes gang culture is holding the black community back by forcing them to focus on infighting instead of the bigger picture.
- Big Ap – Zulu X's right-hand man and DJ. Big of stature and of heart, he can bring an element of fun to any situation.
- Polo – Jimmy Guapo's best friend and hype man. He accompanies Jimmy everywhere.
- Master Sun – An ancient, mysterious being that visits the Zulu X team aids them in their quest. He grants them ancient weapons and knowledge about the enemy they face.
- Emeritis – Master Sun's bodyguard and trusted ally.
- Apep – An evil alien, he has been working for millennia to subjugate portions of the human race. He incites race tensions to keep people focused on fighting themselves so he can seize power.
- Agent Hughes – A CIA agent investigating the zombie outbreak in LA.

== Technology integration ==
In addition to the comic, the group also released Augmented and Virtual Reality companion applications. The AR app scans the pages and adds special effects and a full cast reading, while the VR app retells portions of the story in a 3D comic book world.

=== AR cast ===
The AR app added a full cast reading of the comic, with characters being voiced by prominent Hip-hop artists and actors.

- Narrator – Stan Lee
- Master Sun – Rakim
- Polo – Jaden Smith
- Saleem – Jamie Foxx
- Malik – Charlamagne Tha God
- Lady Nix – Queen Latifah
- Big Ap – Common
- Apep – Jason Isaacs
- Emeritis – Mary J Blige
- Agent Hughes – Rosario Dawson
- Secret Agent – Ice-T
- DJ Eddie Flip – Slick Rick
- Sonny – Raekwon
- Jay Jay – Redman
- Zulu X – KRS-One
- Jimmy Guapo – Michael Rapaport
- Tyrone – Snoop Dogg
- Amun Ra – John DiMaggio
- Amari Jones – Flavor Flav

== Editions ==
Title (Trade Paperback/ Hardcover)	Number	Publication date	Publisher	ISBN
Masters of the Sun – The Zombie Chronicles	#1	August 31, 2017	Marvel Comics	9781302910846
