= Imma Be =

2010 song by the Black Eyed Peas

Single by the Black Eyed Peas

from the album The E.N.D.
- A-side: "Rock That Body"
- Released: January 12, 2010
- Recorded: 2009
- Genre: Hip hop; EDM
- Length: 4:16 (album version); 3:53 (radio edit)
- Label: Interscope
- Songwriters: William Adams; Allan Pineda; Jaime Gomez; Stacy Ferguson; Keith Harris; Thomas Brenneck; Michael Deller; Daniel Foder; Jared Tankel
- Producers: will.i.am; Keith Harris

The Black Eyed Peas singles chronology
"Meet Me Halfway" (2009)	"Imma Be" (2010)	"Rock That Body" (2010)

Audio sample
- The Black Eyed Peas – Imma Be: file; help

Music video
- "Imma Be" on YouTube

"Imma Be" is a song by the American group the Black Eyed Peas from their fifth studio album The E.N.D. (2009). It was released as the fourth single from The E.N.D. on January 12, 2010, by Interscope Records. Initially released as a promotional single, the song titularly refers to the informal contraction imma.

"Imma Be" received generally mixed reviews from critics, who praised the group's confidence and second part of the song, but expressed ambivalence towards its first half. The accompanying music video for the song was filmed back-to-back as a ten-minute video, titled "Imma Be Rocking That Body", with "Rock That Body". The song was part of the soundtrack of the film The Other Guys (2010) and was used in the bar scene, and appeared in the film The Hangover Part II (2011).

== Critical reception ==
Critical response to the song was generally mixed. Eric Henderson from Slant Magazine stated that in the song, "halfway through, the pulse gets an upgrade, the tempo hustles up to a strut, the rudimentary synth hits explode into a chunky-funky rush, and before you know it, will.i.am has transformed a deliberately lazy self-parody into a heated club-floor burner. He added: "The dialectic without conversation within "Imma Be" is replayed ad nauseam throughout the album's entire bloated running time". PopMatters gave the song a positive review: "Highlights of the album include 'Imma be', which despite the repetition of the title no less than 105 times...takes a really interesting path from hip-hop attitude to club hit to jazz romp that holds up well to repeated listens". Vibe Magazine said that "Imma Be is the 2008 version of 'My Humps'". Billboard said "The group sounds as unabashedly confident as ever here.....A brazen horn section and smooth keyboards cruise along until the song's sudden transition, when the beat switches from a snap music-meets-Neptunes stomp to a funk-house glide, meshing with a seemingly endless vocal loop of 'Imma be' to form a pounding, assertive club thumper. Given the success of its predecessors, 'Imma Be', while inherently gimmicky, should be sticking around for a long time".

== Chart performance ==
Prior to The E.N.D.'s release, "Imma Be" was released as a worldwide promotional single and peaked at number 50 in the United States, based on downloads alone. It was later released as the fourth single from the album in the U.S. and became the group's third number one hit on the Billboard Hot 100 for the week ending March 6, 2010 and halted the nine-week run of Kesha's "Tik Tok". It was the group's third number one from The E.N.D., following their first two number ones, "Boom Boom Pow" and "I Gotta Feeling", as well as their fourth consecutive top ten from the album. With the single reaching number one, the Black Eyed Peas became the first group or duo to place three number ones on the Hot 100 from one album since the Wilson Phillips's debut album, Wilson Phillips, in 1990–1991. This placed the Black Eyed Peas adjoined with Usher's 2004 Confessions album to have their singles from the same album spend the most weeks on top of the Billboard Hot 100, at 28 weeks, only beaten by Drake's Scorpion, (2018) whose singles spent 29 collective weeks at number one. "Imma Be" reached the top ten on the Canadian Hot 100 due to a significant increase in digital downloads following a performance of "Imma Be" at the 52nd Grammy Awards.

== Music video ==
The Black Eyed Peas during the first half of "Imma Be Rockin That Body"

The video was filmed on the day after the song's release. The clip features Fergie wearing Louboutin designer footwear and a black metallic leotard and riding a BMW S1000RR motorcycle. Extras were dressed as robots and nomads (like apl.de.ap in "Meet Me Halfway"). It was shot on a desert road in Lancaster, California. Filming was interrupted by a sudden sandstorm; however, as the storm passed, filming resumed. The music video, directed by Rich Lee, was shot back to back with the video for "Rock That Body", the second song on The E.N.D. The two songs were mashed up into a medley, which is titled "Imma Be Rocking That Body". The medley length is 8:15 and the music video in total is 10:21. It premiered on Vevo and Dipdive on February 16, 2010. The videos were separated for music channels with the introduction and conclusion removed.

=== Synopsis ===
The "Imma Be Rocking That Body" video begins with the Black Eyed Peas in the studio when will.i.am demonstrates a machine that recreates vocal recordings of singers and rappers from a set of typed lyrics and a series of vocal samples. After the other members protest against the device's use, Fergie walks out of the studio in frustration and rides off in a motorcycle only to get hit by a car.

The "Imma Be" video then begins with Fergie, following her accident, waking up on a road in a desert where she notices everything stuck on a loop. She gets up and sings the first verse, trailed by an evil black giant robot. She arrives at a bar and finds will.i.am who is stuck on a loop of pouring his drink. She mutes his Beats which makes him stop. He notices that the robot who looped him is following them and they both hide. As the robot looks for them, they both escape in a hovercar. The robot chases them but it runs out of energy. They arrive at a scrapyard where they find apl.de.ap who is also stuck on a loop. will.i.am taps him and makes him stop. apl.de.ap brings a good white robot to life as they dig through the scrap and find Taboo whose bottom half of his body is missing. will.i.am and apl.de.ap carry him as they find a pair of legs walking around the scrapyard and they quickly fix him. As apl.de.ap raps his verse, the robots dance in the background and they disappear, leaving the evil robot confused.

== Track listing ==
Digital Download E.P.

No.	Title	Length
1.	"Imma Be" (Wolfgang Gartner Remix)	6:24
2.	"Imma Be" (Danger Olympic Remix)	4:31
3.	"Imma Be" (Poet Name Life & DJ Ammo Remix)	4:42
4.	"Rock That Body" (Skrillex Remix)	5:09
5.	"Rock That Body" (Chris Lake Remix)	5:54
6.	"Rock That Body" (apl.de.ap and DJ Replay Remix)	5:54
Total length:		31:21

UK & German CD Single

No.	Title	Length
1.	"Imma Be" (Album version)	4:12
2.	"Imma Be" (Wolfgang Gartner Remix)	7:00

== Charts ==
=== Weekly charts ===
Chart (2010)	Peak position
Australia (ARIA)	7
Belgium (Ultratip Bubbling Under Flanders)	2
Belgium (Ultratip Bubbling Under Wallonia)	8
Canada Hot 100 (Billboard)	5
Germany (GfK)	49
Hungary (Single Top 40)	4
Poland Dance (ZPAV)	50
Scotland Singles (OCC)	76
UK Singles (OCC)	55
UK Hip Hop/R&B (OCC)	21
US Billboard Hot 100	1
US Adult Pop Airplay (Billboard)	36
US Dance Club Songs (Billboard)	1
US Hot R&B/Hip-Hop Songs (Billboard)	12
US Pop Airplay (Billboard)	2
US Rhythmic Airplay (Billboard)	4

=== Monthly charts ===
Chart (2010)	Peak position
Brazil (Brasil Hot 100 Airplay)	26
Brazil (Brasil Hot Pop Songs)	10

=== Year-end charts ===
Chart (2010)	Position
Australia (ARIA)	81
Brazil (Crowley)	21
Canada (Canadian Hot 100)	53
US Billboard Hot 100	20
US Hot R&B/Hip-Hop Songs (Billboard)	68
US Mainstream Top 40 (Billboard)	26
US Rhythmic (Billboard)	19

== Certifications ==
Region	Certification	Certified units/sales
Australia (ARIA)	Platinum	70,000^{^}
Brazil (Pro-Música Brasil)	Gold	30,000^{‡}
Canada (Music Canada)	Platinum	80,000^{*}
New Zealand (RMNZ) Imma Be Rocking That Body	Platinum	30,000^{‡}
United Kingdom (BPI)	Silver	200,000^{‡}
United States (RIAA)	6× Platinum	6,000,000^{‡}
^{*} Sales figures based on certification alone.^{^} Shipments figures based on certification alone.^{‡} Sales+streaming figures based on certification alone.

== Release history ==
Release dates and formats for "Imma Be"
Region	Date	Format(s)	Label(s)	Ref.
United States	January 12, 2010	Rhythmic contemporary radio	Interscope	
Germany	June 25, 2010	CD	Universal Music	

== See also ==
- List of Billboard Hot 100 number ones of 2010
- List of Billboard Hot Dance Club Songs number ones of 2010
