= Don't Stop the Party (Black Eyed Peas song) =

2011 single by the Black Eyed Peas

Single by Black Eyed Peas

from the album The Beginning
- B-side: "The Situation"
- Released: May 9, 2011
- Genre: Dutch house; hip house; EDM
- Length: 6:07 (album version); 4:00 (radio edit)
- Label: Interscope
- Songwriters: will.i.am; apl.de.ap; Taboo; Fergie; Joshua Alvarez; DJ Ammo
- Producers: DJ Ammo; will.i.am

Black Eyed Peas singles chronology
"Just Can't Get Enough" (2011)	"Don't Stop the Party" (2011)	"Where's the Love?" (2016)

Music video
- "Don't Stop the Party" on YouTube

"Don't Stop the Party" is a song by American hip-hop group the Black Eyed Peas. The song was written by members will.i.am, apl.de.ap, Taboo, and Fergie, along with Joshua Alvarez, and DJ Ammo, and was produced by will.i.am. and DJ Ammo for the group's sixth studio album, The Beginning (2010). The song, described as "a hot club jam," features will.i.am rapping in a thick, Caribbean patois.

The song received mixed reviews from music critics, some of them criticizing the use of will.i.am.'s wordplay and characterizing it as "more of the same dancefloor song." Still, others thought that the song was an "exhilarating and whirlwind track." The song became a success in Brazil, Australia, France, and Greece. However, the song has become the band's lowest-charting single to date in the U.S., peaking at number 86. This song also was the last time they charted on the Billboard Hot 100, until the J Balvin collaboration, "Ritmo (Bad Boys for Life)" in late 2019, which debuted at 100, later peaking at 26.

== Background and composition ==
This is one of three tracks on The Beginning to be produced by Damien "DJ Ammo" LeRoy, the other two being the lead single "The Time (Dirty Bit)" and "Do It Like This". The Beginning's third single was announced on the Black Eyed Peas' official website on May 9, 2011. Described as a "buzzing, hot club jam", it features whooshing synths and slap-funk bass grooves. It is the longest track on the album at close to six minutes. Black Eyed Peas member will.i.am told Spin magazine that he is proud enough of the song that he'd even play it for Jay-Z. "I would go to Jay's studio and play this be like 'Boom! Check it out!", said Will. "Then I go dirty Caribbean on him on the last verse."

== Critical reception ==
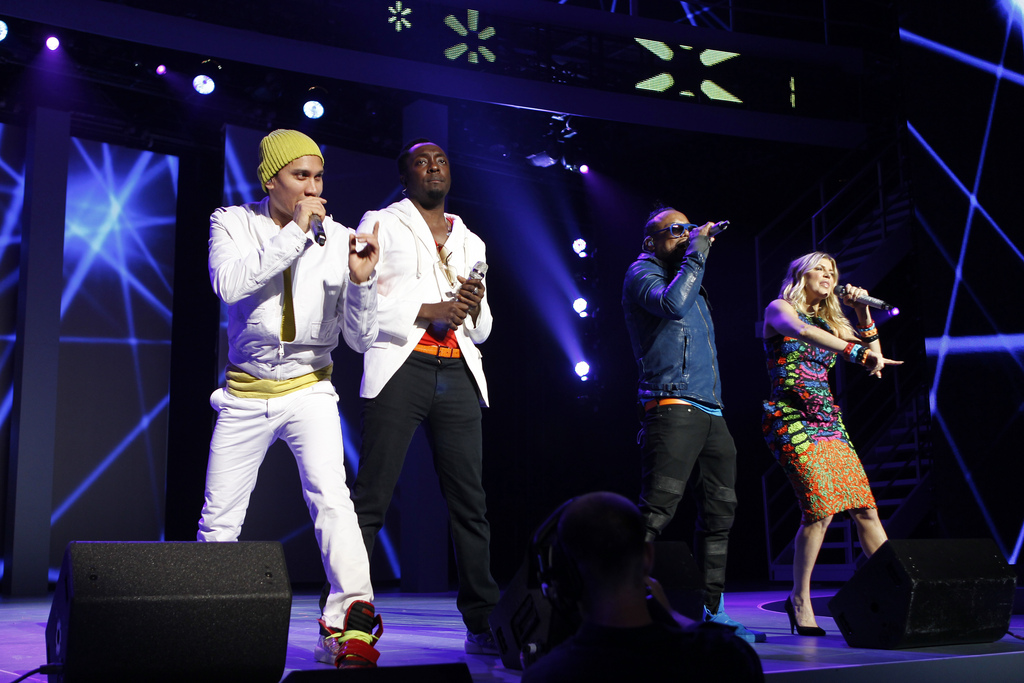
The Black Eyed Peas performing "Don't Stop the Party" in Walmart Meeting, 2011

Monica Herrera wrote for Billboard that "the music is expertly produced, but problems arise when Will.i.am claims the same of his wordplay. On the track 'Don't Stop the Party', he chest-thumps, 'Kill you with my lyricals/Call me verbal criminal.' It's a silly boast for an artist who clearly focuses on beats over rhymes, and is probably better off for it." Andy Gill wrote for The Independent that "with martial synth-stomp riffs, spartan electro beats and loping bass grooves driving tracks whose single-mindedness is signalled by titles like 'Don't Stop the Party'." A positive review came from Bill Lamb, editor from About.com, who went to say that: "BEP boost the beat as they request 'Don't Stop the Party'."Lamb said that "will.i.am starts talking about futurism here again and sure enough we find ourselves in the middle of a futuristic sounding trance break. The party reaches its peak about five minutes into the song, and it is exhilarating." Other positive reaction came from John Bush, editor from Allmusic who went to say that the song is a "scattered moment of respectability" and chose it as an "AMG Pick". Gavin Martin wrote for Daily Mirror that "the operatically ambitious 'Don't Stop the Party' gives way to a briefly terrifying interlude that is more or less a declaration of earth-shaking sonic war."

== Music video ==
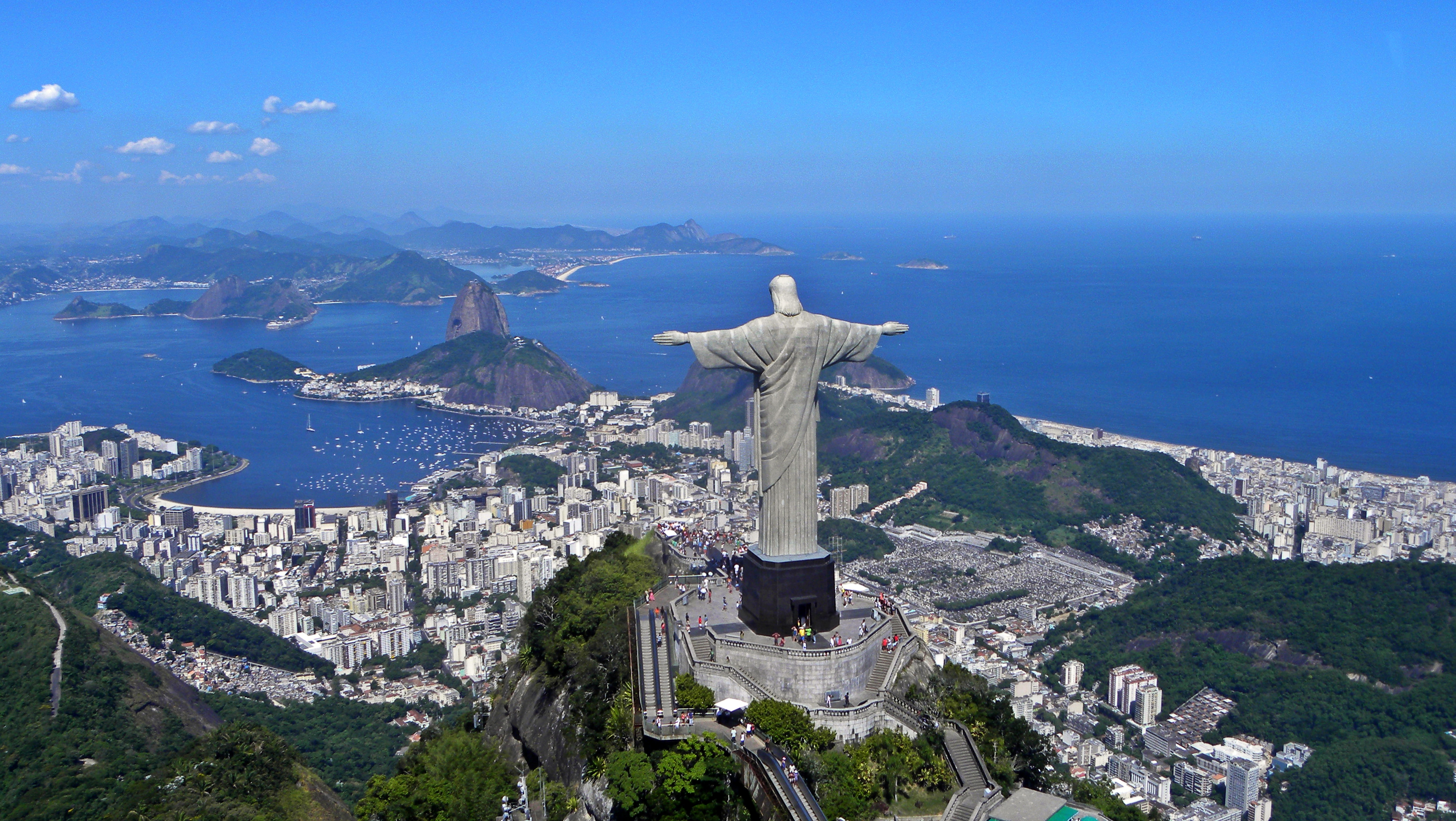
Rio de Janeiro is one of many Brazilian places featured in the video.

The music video, which is directed by Ben Mor, features on-stage and backstage footages of the group during their 'The E.N.D. World Tour' in Brazil in 2010 and was released to iTunes and YouTube/VEVO on May 10, 2011. Beside live footage of the tour, the video also features panoramic shoots of Brazilian landscapes and city life. Closing section of the video documents a visit to a Brazilian record shop, during which close-ups of records by José Roberto Bertrami, Afrika Bambaataa & the Soulsonic Force, Carlos Malcolm and Di Melo are shown.

== Live performances ==
The Black Eyed Peas performed "Don't Stop the Party" live on The Paul O'Grady Show on May 13, 2011. It was part of their set at Radio 1's Big Weekend 2011. On May 17, 2011, the group also performed the song at the French edition of X Factor. On May 24, the band was on season 12 of Dancing with the Stars to perform the track. In June 2011, the band did a mashup of the song with Stromae's "Alors on danse" on French TV show Taratata. The song is included to the official setlist of the promotional tour for The Beginning Massive Stadium Tour.

== Track listing ==
Digital download

1. "Don't Stop the Party" – 6:07

German CD single

1. "Don't Stop the Party" (radio edit) – 4:00
2. "The Situation" (album version) – 3:47

== Credits and personnel ==
- Vocals – will.i.am, apl.de.ap, Taboo, Fergie
- Songwriting – will.i.am, apl.de.ap, Taboo, Fergie, Joshua Alvarez, Damien LeRoy
- Production – will.i.am, DJ Ammo
- Guitar – Alain Whyte
- Synthesizers, Moog Bass – DJ Ammo
- Live Bass – Caleb Speir

== Charts ==
=== Weekly charts ===
Chart (2011)	Peak position
Australia (ARIA)	16
Austria (Ö3 Austria Top 40)	5
Belgium (Ultratop 50 Flanders)	6
Belgium Dance (Ultratop Flanders)	3
Belgium (Ultratop 50 Wallonia)	3
Belgium Dance (Ultratop Wallonia)	1
Canada Hot 100 (Billboard)	18
Czech Republic Airplay (ČNS IFPI)	12
France (SNEP)	3
Germany (GfK)	27
Hungary (Dance Top 40)	15
Hungary (Rádiós Top 40)	7
Ireland (IRMA)	10
Italy (Musica e dischi)	44
Luxembourg Digital Songs (Billboard)	9
Mexico Anglo (Monitor Latino)	19
Netherlands (Single Top 100)	75
New Zealand (Recorded Music NZ)	9
Poland Dance (ZPAV)	9
Poland (Polish Airplay New)	5
Romania (Romanian Top 100)	96
Scottish Singles Sales (Official Charts)	10
Slovakia Airplay (ČNS IFPI)	19
Switzerland (Schweizer Hitparade)	25
UK Singles (Official Charts)	17
UK Dance (Official Charts)	6
US Billboard Hot 100	86
US Latin Pop Airplay (Billboard)	25
US Pop Airplay (Billboard)	23

=== Year-end charts ===
Chart (2011)	Position
Austria (Ö3 Austria Top 40)	69
Belgium (Ultratop 50 Flanders)	53
Belgium (Ultratop 50 Wallonia)	18
Brazil (Crowley)	82
France (SNEP)	19
Hungary (Dance Top 40)	41
Hungary (Rádiós Top 40)	41
Poland (Dance Top 50)	30
UK Singles (OCC)	130

== Certifications ==
Region	Certification	Certified units/sales
Australia (ARIA)	Platinum	70,000^{^}
Belgium (BRMA)	Gold	15,000^{*}
Brazil (Pro-Música Brasil)	Diamond	250,000^{‡}
Italy (FIMI)	Gold	15,000^{*}
New Zealand (RMNZ)	Gold	7,500^{*}
Switzerland (IFPI Switzerland)	Gold	15,000^{^}
United Kingdom (BPI)	Silver	200,000^{‡}
^{*} Sales figures based on certification alone.^{^} Shipments figures based on certification alone.^{‡} Sales+streaming figures based on certification alone.

== Release history ==
Release dates and formats for "Don't Stop the Party"
Region	Date	Format	Label	Ref.
Australia	May 9, 2011	Contemporary hit radio	Universal	
Italy	June 3, 2011	Radio airplay	Universal	
Germany	June 24, 2011	CD	Universal	
United States	June 28, 2011	Contemporary hit radio	Interscope	
