= Behind the Bridge to Elephunk =

Video by the Black Eyed Peas
- Released: May 26, 2004
- Recorded: 1997–2004
- Label: A&M; Interscope; will.i.am
- Director: Brian Beletic; Patricio Ginelsa; Joseph Kahn; The Malloys; Anthony Mandler; Fatima Robinson; will.i.am
- Producer: Bill Boyd; Randi Feinberg; Terry Heller; Louis Nader; Betina Schneider; Joel Tabbush; Greg Tharp

The Black Eyed Peas chronology
Behind the Bridge to Elephunk (2004)	Live from Sydney to Vegas (2006)

Behind the Bridge to Elephunk is the first video album by American group the Black Eyed Peas. It was released outside North America on May 26, 2004, by A&M Records, Interscope Records and will.i.am Music Group. The album includes music videos for singles from the group's first three studio albums–Behind the Front (1998), Bridging the Gap (2000) and Elephunk (2003)–alongside live performances and behind-the-scenes footage.

== Release ==
Behind the Bridge to Elephunk was released outside North America on May 26, 2004, by Polydor Records. The DVD included a "Jukebox" feature, which allows the music videos to be played in a random order non-stop. It included the previously unreleased music video for "The Boogie That Be", which was filmed before the song was recorded and before Fergie joined the group. Most of the DVD's content was made available for streaming to members of the group's fan club Peabody.

== Track listing ==
No.	Title	Director(s)	Length
1.	"Let's Get Retarded" (live at the Big Day Out)
2.	"Hey Mama"	Fatima Robinson
3.	"Shut Up"	The Malloys
4.	"Where Is the Love?"	will.i.am
5.	"B.E.P. Empire"	Brian Beletic
6.	"Weekends"	Beletic
7.	"Get Original"	Anthony Mandler
8.	"Request + Line"	Joseph Kahn
9.	"Fallin' Up"	Beletic
10.	"Joints & Jam"	Beletic
11.	"Karma"	Beletic
12.	"What It Is"	Beletic
13.	"Head Bobs"	Beletic
14.	"Discover Hip-Hop" (special feature)
15.	"Where Is the Love?" (making of)
16.	"Shut Up" (making of)
17.	"Hey Mama" (making of)
18.	"Shut Up" (live at the Big Day Out)
19.	"The Boogie That Be"	Patricio Ginelsa
20.	"Photo Gallery"

== Personnel ==
Credits are adapted from the liner notes of Behind the Bridge to Elephunk.

- Brian Beletic – direction (tracks 5, 6, 9–13)
- Bill Boyd – production (track 4)
- Randi Feinberg – production (tracks 2 and 3)
- Terry Heller – production (track 7)
- Joseph Kahn – direction (track 8)
- The Malloys – direction (track 3)
- Anthony Mandler – direction (track 7)
- Louis Nader – production (track 10)
- Lanette Phillips – executive production (track 8)
- Fatima Robinson – direction (track 2)
- Betina Schneider – production (tracks 9 and 11)
- Joel Tabbush – production (tracks 5 and 6)
- Greg Tharp – production (track 8)
- will.i.am – direction (track 4)

== Charts ==
Weekly chart performance for Behind the Bridge to Elephunk
Chart (2004)	Peak position
Australian Music DVD (ARIA)	17

== Certifications ==
Certifications and sales for Behind the Bridge to Elephunk
Region	Certification	Certified units/sales
Argentina (CAPIF)	Platinum	8,000^{^}
Australia (ARIA)	Gold	7,500^{^}
^{^} Shipments figures based on certification alone.

== Release history ==
Release dates and formats for Behind the Bridge to Elephunk
Region	Date	Format(s)	Label(s)	Ref.
Sweden	May 26, 2004	DVD	Universal Music	
Portugal	May 27, 2004	DVD	Universal Music	
Germany	May 31, 2004	DVD	Universal Music	
France	June 1, 2004	DVD	Polydor	
Netherlands	June 1, 2004	DVD	Universal Music	
Poland	June 3, 2004	DVD	Universal Music	
Australia	June 7, 2004	DVD	Universal Music	
Japan	June 16, 2004	DVD	Universal Music	
Brazil	July 22, 2004	DVD	Universal Music	
