= Live from Sydney to Vegas =

Video by the Black Eyed Peas
- Released: November 23, 2006
- Recorded: June 3, 2005–August 2006
- Venue: The Joint (Las Vegas); Sydney SuperDome (Sydney)
- Genre: Hip hop; pop; R&B
- Label: A&M; Interscope; will.i.am
- Director: Nick Wickham

The Black Eyed Peas chronology
Behind the Bridge to Elephunk (2004)	Live from Sydney to Vegas (2006)

Live from Sydney to Vegas is the second video album by the Black Eyed Peas. It was released on November 23, 2006, by A&M Records, Interscope Records and will.i.am Music Group. Filmed during their world tour The Monkey Business Tour (2005–2006), its technology enables the viewers to switch back and forth between the October 3, 2005 show at the Sydney SuperDome and the June 3, 2005 show at the Hard Rock Hotel and Casino's The Joint.

== Release ==
In the United States, Live from Sydney to Vegas was released on December 5, 2006, by A&M Records, Interscope Records and will.i.am Music Group. The DVD featured a technology which allowed its viewers, when watching performances of "Dum Diddly", "Don't Lie", "Where Is the Love?" and "Don't Phunk with My Heart" during the Sydney concert, to simultaneously see them during the Las Vegas concert by pressing "enter". In the United Kingdom, the Sydney concert premiered on 4Music on September 9, 2009. The concert's length was shortened to an hour, hence several tracks and explicit lyrics were omitted from the broadcast.

== Track listing ==
No.	Title	Length
1.	"Hey Mama"
2.	"Smells Like Funk"
3.	"Dum Diddly"
4.	"Don't Lie"
5.	"Shut Up" (original version/Knee Deep Remix medley)
6.	"Taboo Freestyle"
7.	"apl.de.ap Freestyle"
8.	"will.i.am Freestyle"
9.	"Fergie Freestyle"
10.	"Labor Day (It's a Holiday)"
11.	"Pump It"
12.	"Where Is the Love?"
13.	"Don't Phunk with My Heart"
14.	"Let's Get It Started"
15.	"Union" (music video)
16.	"Bebot" (music video)
17.	"London Bridge" (live from Yahoo! Music)
18.	"My Humps"

== Charts ==
Weekly chart performance for Live from Sydney to Vegas
Chart (2007)	Peak position
Australian Music DVD (ARIA)	38

== Certifications ==
Certifications and sales for Live from Sydney to Vegas
Region	Certification	Certified units/sales
Argentina (CAPIF)	Platinum	8,000^{^}
Australia (ARIA)	Platinum	15,000^{^}
Brazil (Pro-Música Brasil)	Gold	15,000^{*}
^{*} Sales figures based on certification alone.^{^} Shipments figures based on certification alone.

== Release history ==
Release dates and formats for Live from Sydney to Vegas
Region	Date	Format(s)	Label(s)	Ref.
Austria	November 23, 2006	DVD	Universal Music	
Denmark	November 23, 2006	DVD	Universal Music	
Netherlands	November 23, 2006	DVD	Universal Music	
Poland	December 1, 2006	DVD	Universal Music	
Australia	December 2, 2006	DVD	Universal Music	
France	December 4, 2006	DVD	Universal Music	
United States	December 5, 2006	DVD	A&M; Interscope; will.i.am	
Japan	January 31, 2007	DVD	Universal Music	
Argentina	February 8, 2007	DVD	Universal Music	
