= Elephunk =

2003 album by Black Eyed Peas

- Standard cover (Note: Asian special edition cover is the same as the single cover for "Shut Up".)

Studio album by the Black Eyed Peas
- Released: June 24, 2003
- Recorded: August 23, 2001 – May 11, 2003
- Studios: Glenwood Place (Burbank) (Note: Tracks 1, 5–7, 13); Record Plant (Los Angeles) (Note: Tracks 2, 10, 11); The Stewchia (Los Angeles) (Note: Tracks 1, 3–5, 7–10, 13); Velvet Tone (Sacramento) (Note: Track 12); Unnamed location (Bodega Bay) (Note: Track 6)
- Genres: Hip-hop; pop
- Length: 59:30
- Languages: English; Spanish; Tagalog
- Labels: A&M; Interscope; will.i.am
- Producers: will.i.am; apl.de.ap; Ron Fair; Poet Name Life

The Black Eyed Peas chronology
Bridging the Gap (2000)	Elephunk (2003)	Monkey Business (2005)

Singles from Elephunk
- 1. "Where Is the Love?" Released: May 12, 2003; 2. "Shut Up" Released: September 8, 2003; 3. "Hey Mama" Released: January 12, 2004

Singles from the reissue of Elephunk
- 1. "Let's Get It Started" Released: June 1, 2004

Elephunk is the third studio album by American group the Black Eyed Peas. It was released on June 24, 2003, by A&M Records, Interscope Records and will.i.am Music Group. Production of the album commenced in August 2001, and would be affected by the September 11 attacks, which both caused anxiety to the group members and inspired the songwriting. During the process, Fergie joined the group as the female vocalist, replacing Kim Hill, who departed the group in 2000. The recording sessions went on to be extended until May 2003, which caused its release to be postponed multiple times.

Elephunk is a hip-hop and pop record incorporating an array of genres, such as R&B, Latin, funk, dancehall, rock and dance. It explores lyrical themes such as relationships, partying and social issues. The album was met with critical polarity upon its release, who praised its individual songs but were divided on the album's variety of genres and lyrical content. The album received six Grammy Award nominations and one win.

The Black Eyed Peas' breakthrough album, it was a sleeper hit, debuting at number 33 on the US Billboard 200 and peaking at number 14 after its 2004 reissue. It was certified double platinum by the Recording Industry Association of America (RIAA), selling over three million units in the United States. Internationally, it peaked atop the charts in Australia and Switzerland, reaching the top ten in nearly every other country. One of the best-selling albums of 2004, the album has sold over nine million copies worldwide.

Elephunk produced four singles. "Where Is the Love?" became the group's first top-ten single on the US Billboard Hot 100, peaking at number eight, and reached number one in 15 countries. Its follow-up singles "Shut Up" and "Hey Mama" achieved widespread international success but failed to duplicate the US success of "Where Is the Love?". Regardless, the former topped the charts in 14 countries, while the latter won an MTV Video Music Award. The final single "Let's Get It Started", a censored re-recording of the track "Let's Get Retarded", peaked at number 21 on the Billboard Hot 100. The album was further promoted globally with the Elephunk Tour (2004).

== Background and recording ==
After signing a record deal with Interscope Records, Black Eyed Peas released two critically acclaimed but commercially unsuccessful studio albums–Behind the Front (1998) and Bridging the Gap (2000). The latter produced the single "Request + Line", featuring Macy Gray, which was their first to enter the US Billboard Hot 100 and numerous international charts, but peaked only at number 63 on the Billboard Hot 100. Following the commercial failures, it was uncertain whether the group would continue recording together. will.i.am met Ron Fair, then-president of A&M Records, when he recruited the group for the Legally Blonde (2001) soundtrack, for which they recorded the song "Magic" featuring Terry Dexter. Fair offered the group to move to A&M, which they accepted. In order to make them more commercially successful, Fair suggested a musical direction change: "I asked them, 'How would you feel about taking a leap and going more into the pop world?' They replied, 'We don't want to lose our credibility or our fanbase.' I said, 'Well, if you don't take a shot at it, it's gonna get worse, because the backpack crowd are the people who will download the records for free.'" The group was initially reluctant; however, after discussions and several songwriting sessions, the idea was pursued. Taboo would later claim if he was going to sell out, he'd "rather be selling out arenas than selling out of my trunk on the corner of my block."

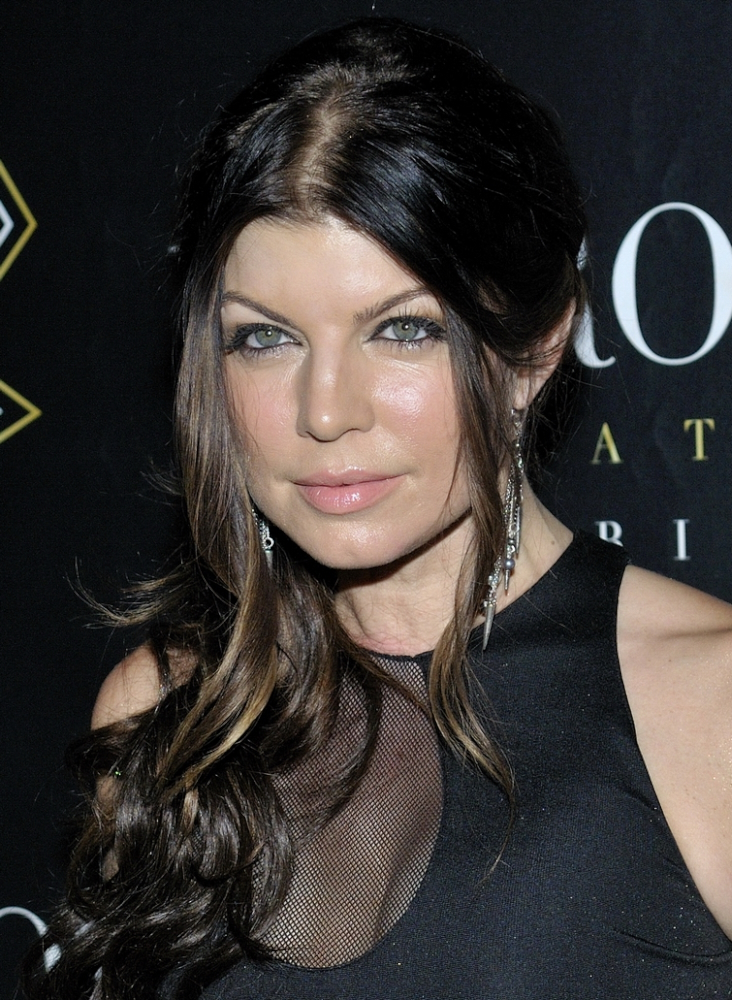
Fergie joined Black Eyed Peas during the production of Elephunk.

The recording for Elephunk commenced on August 23, 2001, with "Smells Like Funk", which wouldn't be finished until July 2, 2002. Sessions took place at various recording studios across California. Most of the tracks were recorded at The Stewchia in Los Feliz, Los Angeles. Other locations included the Glenwood Studio in Burbank, California and Record Plant in Los Angeles. Music for "Smells Like Funk" was recorded at a house in Bodega Bay, California. "Anxiety" was the sole song recorded at Velvet Tone in Sacramento, California, and was recorded from March 24 until July 23, 2002. The final song recorded for the album was "The Boogie That Be", which was finished on May 11, 2003, only a day prior to "Where Is the Love?" being serviced to radio as the lead single. will.i.am wrote "Don't Knock It", a song "about how everybody got their opinion. Just because you don't like it doesn't mean somebody else ain't going to love it", which ultimately failed to make the final cut, much like the mid-tempo "Thanks" and the Rockwilder-produced "Fire".

September 11 attacks greatly affected the group, both by causing them anxiety and by influencing their songwriting. will.i.am stated in 2018: "On our last day [of recording sessions in San Francisco], as I was packing my equipment, I saw the first plane fly through the World Trade Center. I thought it was a film. The fear of driving back home, y'know going over San Francisco bridge. That 10 minute drive across the bridge felt like an hour." In December, will.i.am created a loop and a guitar part he liked; apl.de.ap and Taboo also heard the track and were able to write similar lyrics over it. Justin Timberlake was introduced to the group by Taboo, and got a chance to hear the track. Impressed with the music, Timberlake helped write and sing the chorus. The production of "Where Is the Love?" was temporarily halted in early 2002 as the band burned out over what will.i.am claimed was September 11 attacks-induced anxiety. Its recording later resumed and finished on March 3, 2003.

Black Eyed Peas began recording Elephunk as a trio; original member Kim Hill departed the group in 2000. As a female vocalist was needed for some of the tracks, various singers were brought in to record. Terry Dexter provided backing vocals for "Smells Like Funk", Noelle Scaggs for "Let's Get Retarded" and "Smells Like Funk", and Debi Nova for "Latin Girls". In early 2002, during the recording of "Shut Up", will.i.am once again sought a female vocalist needed for the song. His original choice was Nicole Scherzinger, who was a member of Eden's Crush at the time. He asked Scherzinger's then-fiancé Nick Hexum from 311, who rejected the offer for her. A&R Music Coordinator Dante Santiago asked will.i.am if he could bring his friend Fergie to the session to sing on the song. will.i.am whom met her in 2001 on a radio show where both Black Eyed Peas and Wild Orchid, of which Fergie was a member at the time, performed. She accepted the offer and was soon made a permanent member of Black Eyed Peas, recording the remainder of the album with the group.

== Music and lyrics ==
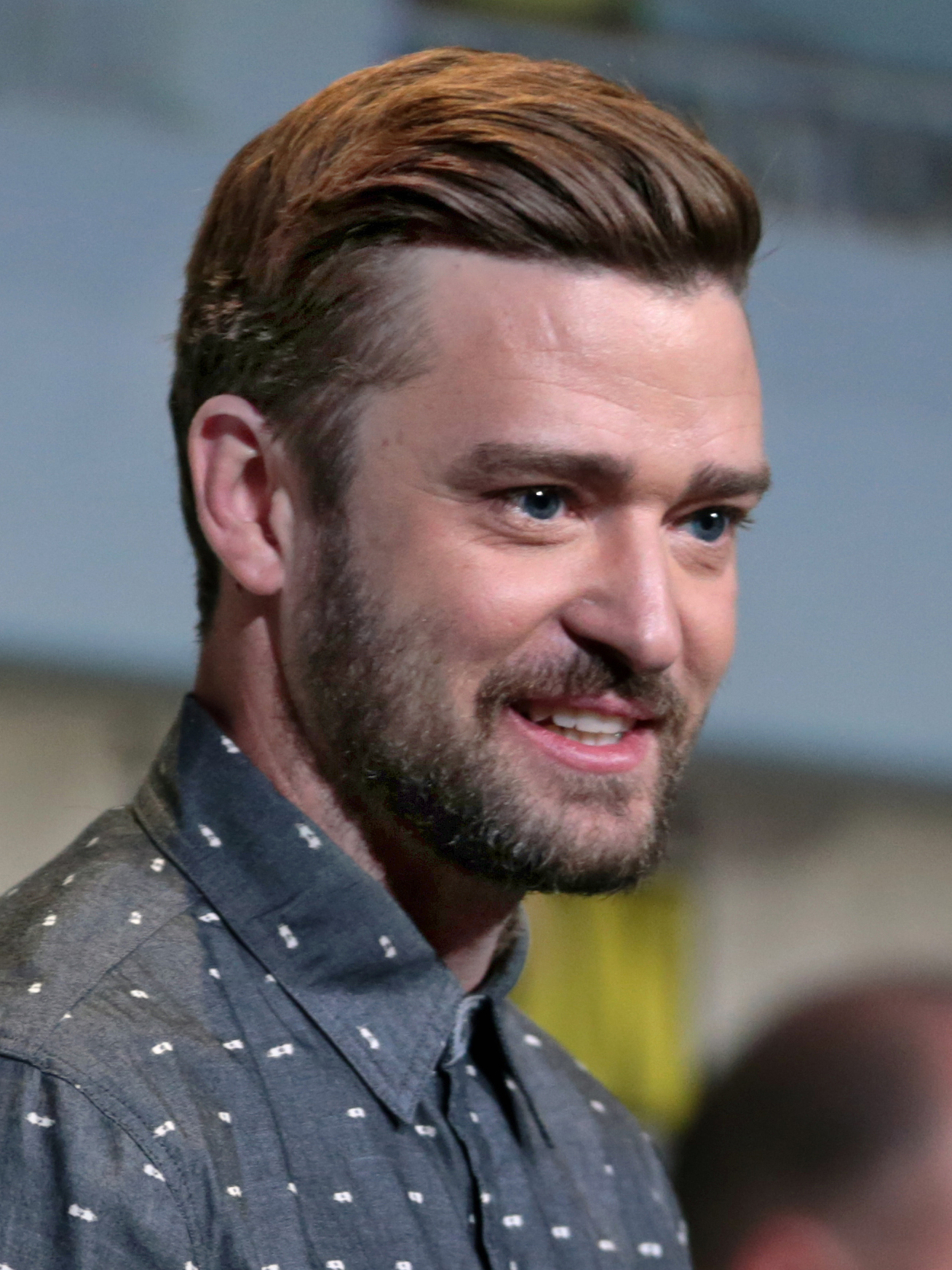
Justin Timberlake co-wrote and was featured on "Where Is the Love?"

Elephunk is a Hip-hop and pop album which incorporates an array of genres, such as R&B, Latin, funk, dancehall, rock and dance. It explores lyrical themes such as partying, sex, infatuation and, to a lesser extent, social issues. The album opens with the horn-infused "Southern-fried rapid rap" song "Hands Up". The trumpet-driven "Labor Day (It's a Holiday)" lyrically celebrates an alcohol and sex-filled three-day weekend. "Let's Get Retarded" encourages its listeners to party with lines such as "Lose your mind, this is the time / Y'all can't stand still, twist and bang your spine / Bob your head like epilepsy / Up inside the club or in your Bentley". Its censored version "Let's Get It Started" replaces the terms "retarded" and "epilepsy", and replaces the original track on the 2022 reissue. The dancehall track "Hey Mama" features a male protagonist expressing his attraction to a woman. "Shut Up" details an argument between two lovers leading up to the end of their relationship. The sixth track "Smells Like Funk" describes an odor-filled environment and insinuates cannabis consumption. "Latin Girls" is a guitar riff-laced song incorporating Latin piano and percussion, and lyrically celebrates Hispanic women. Jazz-influenced "Sexy" sees the male protagonist express his love and admiration towards his female love interest prior to having sex with her.

"Fly Away" is a rock-influenced hip-hop track which encourages a former lover to leave, while "The Boogie That Be" is a "vintage early 1980's electro-funk" song. Electric guitar-driven ballad "The Apl Song" features apl.de.ap rapping–partly in Filipino–about a ghetto in the Philippines where he once lived. "Anxiety", featuring Papa Roach, is a rap metal track in which the protagonist seeks "self-control amidst stressful paranoia". Elephunk closes with its lead single "Where Is the Love?", featuring Justin Timberlake. Although initially intended as a vessel to post-September 11 attacks anxiety, the song discusses many issues, including terrorism, US government hypocrisy, racism, gang crime, pollution, war and intolerance, with the call for love in the chorus as the element tying these together. The lines "Overseas, yeah, we try'na stop terrorism / But we still got terrorists here living / In the USA, the big CIA / The Bloods and the Crips and the KKK" suggests those organizations being terrorists as well. It also alludes to the 2003 invasion of Iraq and its casus belli with the lyric "A war's going on but the reason's undercover" in the bridge. will.i.am laid the track's main rhythm over the chord progression, which he claimed to be inspired by human heartbeat: "I was like, 'this song needs a heartbeat.' I just liked the pull and the call of response of the human heart – a beat, a rhythm that we hear everyday subconsciously, without paying attention to it."

== Title and artwork ==
will.i.am revealed the title of the Black Eyed Peas' third studio album to be Elephunk on June 11, 2002, explaining: "An elephant ain't the fastest, swiftest animal, but it walks smoothly. It's fat. It's heavy. Thump, thump. You can just picture an elephant's movement. That's the sound of the album. We have a lot of trombones, fat basslines, fat grooves, and nice, thick horn layers and arrangements. Just fat funk."

The album cover for Elephunk was designed by [BLK/MRKT Design Studio, Los Angeles] and uses images of the group members photographed by Markus Klinko. It features each member in a corner and an artwork of an elephant's head in the center against a light blue background. The cover marked the first time the group was credited as The Black Eyed Peas, the name they would retire in 2018, when they removed the prefix. It was also inspired by the cover of Goodie Mob's Still Standing.

== Release and promotion ==
Originally set for an October 2002 release, Elephunk was released on June 24, 2003, by A&M Records, Interscope Records and will.i.am Music Group. On June 4, Black Eyed Peas embarked on Justin Timberlake and Christina Aguilera's The Justified & Stripped Tour as a supporting act, touring North America until September 2. Interspersed with the tour, the group headlined a club tour from May 30 until August 31. They performed "Where Is the Love?" at the 2003 MTV Video Music Awards pre-show on August 28. In the United Kingdom and Ireland, they promoted the album by being a supporting act for The Stripped Tour, Aguilera's solo extension of The Justified & Stripped Tour, from October to November, as well as performing "Where Is the Love?" at the 2003 MTV Europe Music Awards and, with "Shut Up", on Top of the Pops on November 28. In the United States, they performed "Where Is the Love?" and "Hey Mama" on Saturday Night Live on January 10, 2004. The group performed "Where Is the Love?" again at the 46th Annual Grammy Awards on February 8, where they received two nominations for the song. Internationally, the group promoted the album by performing at the Big Day Out in Australia and New Zealand from January to February, at the MTV Asia Awards 2004 in Singapore on February 14, at the Sanremo Music Festival 2004 in Italy on March 2, and on the Bravo Super Show in Germany on March 13.

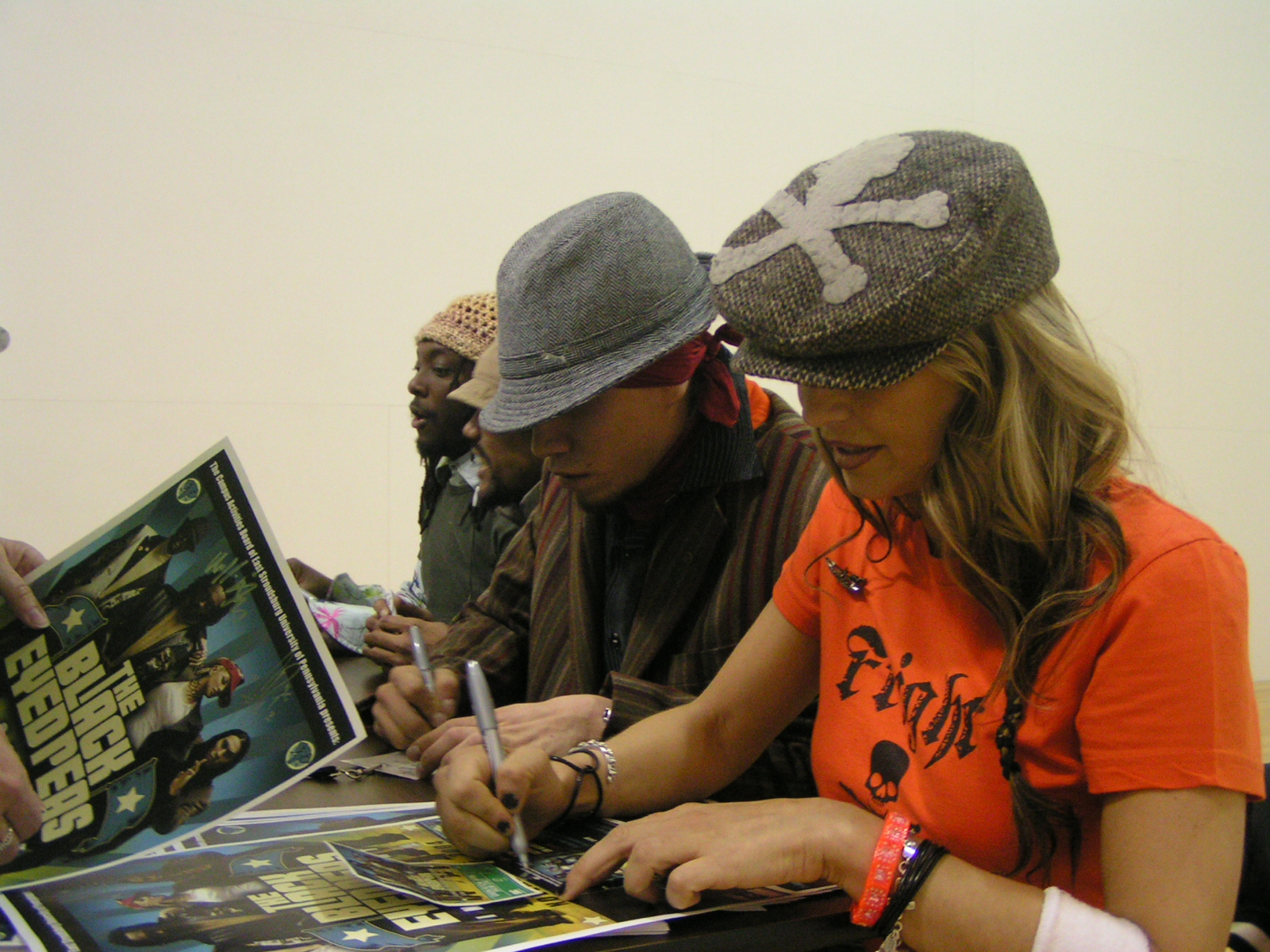
The Black Eyed Peas signing autographs before a concert at the East Stroudsburg University of Pennsylvania during the Elephunk Tour on November 15, 2004

In March, Black Eyed Peas embarked on their third headlining tour, titled Elephunk Tour, and toured North America, Asia, Europe and Oceania until December. On May 24, Elephunk was reissued to include "Let's Get It Started", the re-recorded version of "Let's Get Retarded" used to promote the 2004 NBA playoffs. A video album titled Behind the Bridge to Elephunk was released outside North America on May 26 and included music videos, behind-the-scenes footage and live performances. In August, Electronic Arts (EA) announced that Black Eyed Peas would re-record some of their songs in Simlish and record new tracks for the soundtrack of the 2004 video game The Urbz: Sims in the City, and would also appear in the game as playable characters. The group continued promoting Elephunk by performing "Let's Get It Started" at Fashion Rocks on September 8, at the MTV Video Music Awards Latinoamérica 2004 on October 21, at the VH1 Big in '04 Awards on December 1, and at the 47th Annual Grammy Awards on February 13, 2005, where the song won the group their first Grammy Award, for Best Rap Performance by a Duo or Group. 13 years after its release, the album was made available on vinyl for the first time on September 30, 2016. On April 1, 2022, it was re-released for digital download and streaming worldwide to exclude "Let's Get Retarded", which was replaced by "Let's Get It Started", and to include the hidden track "Third Eye" and the previously UK-only bonus tracks "Rock My Shit" and "What's Goin' Down".

== Singles ==
"Where Is the Love?" was released as the lead single from Elephunk on May 12, 2003. It became the group's breakthrough hit and their first top-ten single on the US Billboard Hot 100, peaking at number eight. The song peaked atop the charts in Australia, Austria, Belgium, Denmark, Germany, Ireland, the Netherlands, New Zealand, Norway, Poland, Romania, Sweden, Switzerland and the United Kingdom, as well as the European Hot 100 Singles and the US Mainstream Top 40. It was the best-selling single of 2003 in the UK. The digital single was certified gold by the Recording Industry Association of America (RIAA) on October 25, 2004, for sales of 500,000 units in the United States. Despite the initial mixed reception from music critics, the song was nominated for Record of the Year and Best Rap/Sung Collaboration at the 46th Annual Grammy Awards (2004). The song's accompanying music video was filmed in East Los Angeles and features will.i.am and Taboo act as a soul music road duo who use music to tell people what is wrong with the world, Fergie as a peacemaker who places stickers with question marks on them all over the place to ask people where the love is, and apl.de.ap as a criminal who is arrested for using criminal offences to tell people the truth.

"Shut Up" was released as the second single from Elephunk on September 8, 2003. It wasn't as successful as its predecessor in the US as it failed to enter the US Billboard Hot 100. However, it duplicated the international commercial success of "Where Is the Love?", peaking atop the charts in Australia, Austria, Belgium, the Czech Republic, France, Germany, Ireland, Italy, New Zealand, Norway, Poland, Romania, Sweden and Switzerland, and the European Hot 100 Singles. The digital single was certified gold by the RIAA on May 19, 2005, for sales of 500,000 units in the US. The song's accompanying music video was directed by The Malloys and features an opera themed around a battle of the sexes, in which will.i.am and Taboo play Fergie's suitors, and apl.de.ap is the conductor. It features cameos by Kimberly Wyatt and Carmit Bachar from the Pussycat Dolls, Travis Barker from Blink-182, Shifty Shellshock from Crazy Town, and French singer Afida Turner.

"Hey Mama" was released as the third single from Elephunk on January 12, 2004. It was an improvement from its predecessor on the US Billboard Hot 100, peaking at number 23, as well as peaking at number eight on the Mainstream Top 40. Internationally, it reached the top ten in Australia, Austria, Belgium, Canada, Croatia, Denmark, Germany, Hungary, Ireland, Italy, the Netherlands, New Zealand, Norway, Switzerland and the UK, and on the European Hot 100 Singles. The digital single was certified gold by the RIAA on October 25, 2004, for sales of 500,000 units in the US. Critically acclaimed, the song was nominated for Best Rap Song at the 47th Annual Grammy Awards (2005). Its accompanying music video features the group performing in a psychedelic limbo, a black-and-white striped room, and a nightclub. At the 2004 MTV Video Music Awards, it won Best Choreography in a Video, while receiving nominations for Best Dance Video and Best Hip-Hop Video.

In April 2004, "Let's Get Retarded" was announced to have been re-recorded and retitled "Let's Get It Started" for its use in promotion of the 2004 NBA playoffs. Initially unplanned as a single, the new version was so well-received it was released as the fourth and final single from Elephunk on June 1, 2004. The song peaked at number 21 on the US Billboard Hot 100, and reached the top ten in Australia, Canada, Czech Republic, France and New Zealand. The digital single was certified triple platinum by the RIAA on June 29, 2012, for sales of three million units in the US. Critically acclaimed, the song won the group their first Grammy Award, for Best Rap Performance by a Duo or Group at the 47th Annual Grammy Awards, and was also nominated for Record of the Year and Best Rap Song. The song's accompanying music video features the group energetically performing in a nighttime Los Angeles setting.

== Reception and legacy ==
=== Contemporary response ===
Professional ratings
Aggregate scores
Source	Rating
Metacritic	66/100
Review scores
Source	Rating
AllMusic	4/5 stars
Alternative Press	4/5
The A.V. Club	(mixed)
Blender	2/5 stars
Drowned in Sound	9/10
Entertainment Weekly	C
HipHopDX	4.0/5
Rolling Stone	2/5 stars
Spin	B+
The Village Voice	A−

Elephunk received generally positive reviews from music critics upon its release, although some were less enthusiastic. At Metacritic, which assigns a normalized rating out of 100 to reviews from mainstream critics, the album has received an average score of 66, based on 15 reviews, indicating generally positive reviews. John Bush from AllMusic wrote that Elephunk "possesses some of the most boundary-pushing productions in contemporary, (mostly) uncommercial hip-hop". Chris Nettleton from Drowned in Sound complimented the album, writing: "This record is full of first rate rapping, first rate tunes, first rate instrumentation. Look on the surface, and you've got an album full of memorable songs, hooks that lodge in your mind... but look in depth, and it's quality from the top down." In his consumer guide for The Village Voice, Robert Christgau called the album "the brightest actual pop album of 2003" and commented that the group "remain unbelievable, but in pop that's just one more aesthetic nuance". K.B. Tindal from HipHopDX described the album as "a collaboration of riffs, funk, rhymes, vocals and beats and looses steam at some points with all the originality that just seems to be all over the place, but it's still a solid outing none the less". Terry Sawyer from PopMatters called the album "one of the essential hip-hop records of the year", adding that it "drops non-stop hook and hump, an album with almost no missteps and more than its share of undeniable, thumping joy." Bill Lehane from musicOMH also praised the album, writing: "With Elephunk, this alternative rap crew have proved again that they are just that, offering a different style of hip-hop to contrast with the gangsta style. Whoever digs that vibe, get your hands up."

Evan Serpick Entertainment Weekly gave Elephunk a less favorable review, stating: "They try dancehall ('Hey Mama'), salsa ('Latin Girls'), even nu-metal ('Anxiety' with Papa Roach), but the biggest offense for a once smart-sounding rap collective is 'Where Is the Love?', the horrifyingly trite single. It's enough to make longtime fans wonder, 'Where are the Peas?'". Ernest Hardy criticized the album's final two tracks, "in which cliched observations, preachy lyrics and MTV-ready posturing float atop meticulously detailed production". Writing for Blender, Joseph Patel labeled the album "too simple for its own good", criticizing its repetitive refrains. Nathan Rabin from The A.V. Club said the album "gets off to a discouraging start, with non-starting dance tracks like "Hands Up," "Labor Day (It's A Holiday)," and the dancehall-flavored "Hey Mama," which sound busy and cluttered without being infectious or catchy. It picks up around its halfway point, though, as the pace gets less frantic and the production becomes smoother, subtler, and more refreshingly sophisticated." Writing for the Canadian publication Exclaim!, Del F. Cowie criticized the album by saying: "With the breadth of music the group attempts to cover, the dumbed-down lyrics now merely function as a means to get from one catchy chorus to another." Bob Waliszewski from the fundamentalist Protestant publication Plugged In objected to the album's sexual themes and profanity.

=== Retrospective impact ===
Retrospective professional ratings
Review scores
Source	Rating
The Rolling Stone Album Guide	2.5/5 stars
The Rolling Stone Album Guide (updated)	4/5 stars

Elephunk and its singles are credited for pushing Black Eyed Peas into stardom and cementing them as pop culture icons. The group's breakthrough record, it became their first charting album in numerous countries, as well as their first album to be certified by the Recording Industry Association of America (RIAA). Specifically, lead single "Where Is the Love?" is credited for establishing the group as a viable act worldwide. According to Katie Sharp from Mic, "it brought an oddball rap group from L.A. right into the public eye. Suddenly, there was a powerful force countering all the macho posturing in rap and the shallowness of pop — there was a catchy song delivering incisive cultural criticism about world peace in the wake of 9/11. And it became a massive global hit."

The album was the group's first to feature Fergie, who was also credited for being "the primary vehicle for the Black Eyed Peas' rise to pop stardom, though. She not only brought sex appeal to the all-male dynamic, but she also brought a heavy emphasis on catchy hooks." Elephunk was also credited for individually propelling Fergie and will.i.am to global prominence. However, the group's newfound commercial success and the introduction of Fergie also resulted with what some critics perceived as a downgrade in quality of the group's music, and the group received accusations of selling out. Writing for Slant Magazine, Sal Cinquemani stated: "The Black Eyed Peas's 2003 breakthrough album, Elephunk, was a slow-building success story. Filling the album with irritatingly catchy songs was a bold, ballsy move you couldn't help but admire, and it transitioned the Peas, with the aide of new member Stacy Ferguson, from the Fugees-lite to omnipresent pop supergroup."

During the Elephunk Tour (2004), which supported Elephunk worldwide, Black Eyed Peas commenced production of their fourth studio album Monkey Business. It was released on May 25, 2005, and became the group's first US Billboard 200 top-ten album, debuting at number two, and produced their first two US Billboard Hot 100 top-three singles–"Don't Phunk with My Heart" and "My Humps".

10 years after the release of Elephunk, will.i.am revealed that representatives from Black Eyed Peas' then-label A&M Records did not like the songs produced for the album, namely "Where Is the Love?", "Shut Up" and "Let's Get Retarded", as they didn't consider them "hits". He added: "Me and apl.de.ap were like, 'Look, dude. If this is going to be our last record, a lot of groups like us are getting dropped. Let's just make the kind of record we want to make; our record.' And so 'Elephunk' was our record." Despite A&M's initial reaction, aforementioned three songs were all released as singles and became award-winning international hits.

=== Accolades ===
Awards and nominations
Year	Award	Category	Nominee(s)	Result	Ref.
2003	Billboard Music Award	Mainstream Top 40 Track of the Year	"Where Is the Love?"	Won	
2004	Grammy Award	Record of the Year	"Where Is the Love?"	Nominated	
2004	Grammy Award	Best Rap/Sung Collaboration	"Where Is the Love?"	Nominated	
2004	Nickelodeon Kids' Choice Awards	Favorite Song	"Where Is the Love?"	Nominated	
2004	MTV Video Music Awards Japan	Best Group Video	"Where Is the Love?"	Nominated	
2004	MTV Video Music Awards Japan	Breakthrough Video	"Where Is the Love?"	Nominated	
2004	Teen Choice Awards	Choice Music – Hip-Hop/Rap Track	"Where Is the Love?"	Won	
2004	MTV Video Music Award	Best Dance Video	"Hey Mama"	Nominated	
2004	MTV Video Music Award	Best Hip-Hop Video	"Hey Mama"	Nominated	
2004	MTV Video Music Award	Best Choreography in a Video	"Hey Mama"	Won	
2004	MTV Europe Music Award	Best Album	Elephunk	Nominated	
2004	Billboard Music Award	Digital Track of the Year	"Let's Get It Started"	Nominated	
2005	Grammy Award	Record of the Year	"Let's Get It Started"	Nominated	
2005	Grammy Award	Best Rap Performance by a Duo or Group	"Let's Get It Started"	Won	
2005	Grammy Award	Best Rap Song	"Let's Get It Started"	Nominated	
2005	Grammy Award	Best Rap Song	"Hey Mama"	Nominated	
2005	MTV Australia Video Music Award	Best R&B Video	"Hey Mama"	Won	
2005	MTV Australia Video Music Award	Sexiest Video	"Hey Mama"	Won	
2005	MTV Video Music Award Japan	Best Hip-Hop Video	"Let's Get It Started"	Nominated	
2005	MuchMusic Video Award	Best International Group Video	"Let's Get It Started"	Nominated	
2005	MuchMusic Video Award	People's Choice: Favorite International Group	"Let's Get It Started"	Nominated	

== Commercial performance ==
Elephunk was a sleeper hit, both domestically and internationally. In the US, it debuted at number 33 on the Billboard 200 chart dated July 12, 2003, with first-week sales of 31,000 copies, reaching number 26 in its seventh week. After a year of fluctuating within the chart, the album peaked at number 14 on June 26, 2004, going on to spend a total of 106 weeks on the Billboard 200. By 2011, it had sold over three million copies in the US. In June 2025, the album was certified quadruple platinum by the Recording Industry Association of America (RIAA), for combined sales and album-equivalent units of four million in the country. In Canada, Elephunk debuted at number eight on January 14, 2004, peaking at number two in its eleventh week. It was certified septuple platinum by the Canadian Recording Industry Association (CRIA) on December 15, 2005.

In the United Kingdom, Elephunk debuted at number 94 on the UK Albums Chart dated August 23, 2003, entering the top ten in its sixth week. On January 17, 2004, the album reached its peak of number three, at which it spent four consecutive weeks. Meanwhile, it peaked atop the UK R&B Albums Chart dated December 6, 2003. On July 22, 2013, it was certified quintuple platinum by the British Phonographic Industry (BPI); it has sold 1.6 million copies in the UK. The album reached number one in Switzerland, after debuting at number 60 and climbing the chart for five months. In France, it debuted at number 115 in July 2003 and originally peaked at number three six months later. Following the August 2004 reissue, it reached a new peak at number two and was certified platinum soon after. Elsewhere in Europe, the album peaked within the top ten in Austria, Belgium, Denmark, Finland, France, Germany, Greece, Ireland, Italy, Norway, Portugal, Scotland, Spain and Sweden, as well as peaking at number two on the European Top 100 Albums. It has been certified triple platinum by the International Federation of the Phonographic Industry (IFPI) for sales of three million copies in Europe.

Elephunk was a commercial success in Oceania as well. In Australia, it debuted at number 50 and went on to peak atop the chart after a year of charting, on August 29, 2004, spending a total of 70 weeks on the chart. The album has been certified quadruple platinum by the Australian Recording Industry Association (ARIA). In New Zealand, it debuted at number 11, and after months of fluctuating within the top 30, peaked at number two on April 19, 2004. The album has been certified quadruple platinum by the Recorded Music NZ (RMNZ). As of September 2013, it has sold over nine million copies worldwide.

== Track listing ==
All tracks are produced by will.i.am. (Note: "The Apl Song" was co-produced by apl.de.ap, "Where Is the Love?" by Ron Fair, and "Rock My Shit" by Poet Named Life.)

Elephunk
No.	Title	Writer(s)	Length
1.	"Hands Up"	Will Adams; Allan Pineda; Jaime Gomez; George Pajon, Jr.; Michael Fratantuno; Jean Baptiste; Billy May	3:35
2.	"Labor Day (It's a Holiday)"	Adams; Pineda; Thomas van Musser; James Brown; Phelps Catfish Collins; Williams Earl Collins; John Griggs; Clayton Gunnells; Darrel Jamiso; Robert McCullough; Clyde Stubblefield; Frank Clifford Waddy	3:58
3.	"Let's Get Retarded"	Adams; Pineda; Gomez; Terence Yoshiaki; Fratantuno; Pajon, Jr.	3:35
4.	"Hey Mama"	Adams; Anthony Henry	3:34
5.	"Shut Up"	Adams; Gomez; J. Curtis; Pajon, Jr.	4:56
6.	"Smells Like Funk"	Adams; Pineda; Fratantuno; Pajon, Jr.	5:04
7.	"Latin Girls"	Adams; Pineda; Gomez; Curtis; Pajon, Jr.; Debi Nova	6:17
8.	"Sexy"	Adams; Antonio Carlos Jobim; Vinícius de Moraes	4:43
9.	"Fly Away"	Stacy Ferguson; Adams; Ray Brady	3:35
10.	"The Boogie That Be"	Adams; John Stephens; van Musser	5:12
11.	"The Apl Song"	Adams; Pineda; Cesar Bañares Jr.	2:54
12.	"Anxiety" (featuring Papa Roach)	Adams; Pineda; Papa Roach	3:38
13.	"Where Is the Love?" (featuring Justin Timberlake)	Adams; Timberlake; Gomez; Pineda; Printz Board; Fratantuno; Pajon, Jr.; Curtis	4:32
14.	"Third Eye" (hidden track)	Adams	3:41

Expanded edition
No.	Title	Writer(s)	Length
3.	"Let's Get It Started"	Adams; Pineda; Gomez; Terence Yoshiaki; Fratantuno; Pajon, Jr.	3:35
15.	"Rock My Shit"	Adams; Jamie Munson; Board	3:50
16.	"What's Goin' Down"	Adams	2:41
17.	"Sumthin for That Ass"	Adams	3:51
18.	"For the People"	Adams; Taz Arnold; Jonathan William Davis; Ommas Keith-Graham; Ali Shaheed Muhammad; Pineda; Malik Taylor	4:02
19.	"Hey Mama" (Jimmy Remix)	Adams; Henry	3:02
20.	"Shut Up" (remix)	Adams; Gomez; J. Curtis; Pajon, Jr.	4:22
21.	"Shut Up" (instrumental)	Adams; Gomez; J. Curtis; Pajon, Jr.	5:09
22.	"Where Is the Love?" (instrumental)	Adams; Timberlake; Gomez; Pineda; Board; Fratantuno; Pajon, Jr.; Curtis	4:33
23.	"Hands Up" (live from the House of Blues, Chicago)	Adams; Pineda; Gomez; Pajon, Jr.; Fratantuno; Baptiste; May	5:07

=== Notes ===
- Track 14 is listed as an individual track on UK, vinyl, and digital editions.
- Tracks 15 and 16 originally appeared on the UK edition, and later on the 2022 revised edition. From the latter edition onwards, track 3 was replaced by "Let's Get It Started" on all reissues.
- Track 17 originally appeared on the Japanese edition.
- Tracks 21 and 22 originally appeared on the Asian special edition bonus VCD, alongside track 17, a live version of "Tell Your Mama Come", and music videos for tracks 5 and 13.
- 2004 reissue pressings include "Let's Get It Started" before the hidden track "Third Eye". French pressings further include House of Blues performances of tracks 1 and 9.

Sample credits

- "Hands Up" contains elements from "Bo Mambo" by Yma Sumac.
- "Labor Day (It's a Holiday)" contains elements from "The Grunt" by The J.B.'s.
- "Sexy" contains replayed elements from "Insensatez" by Antônio Carlos Jobim.
- "The Apl Song" contains resung elements from "Balita" by Asin.

== Personnel ==
Credits are adapted from the liner notes of Elephunk.

- apl.de.ap – vocals (tracks 1–3, 6, 7, 11–13), drum programming (track 11), production (track 11)
- Travis Barker – drums (track 15)
- Printz Board – horns (track 2), trumpet (track 7), clavinet (track 13), Moog synthesizer (track 13)
- Ray Brady – guitar (tracks 5 and 9)
- David Buckner – drums (track 12)
- Davey Chegwidden – percussion (track 7)
- J. Curtis – guitar (tracks 5, 7, 11 and 13)
- Terry Dexter – backing vocals (track 6)
- Dylan Dresdow – engineering (tracks 1, 2, 4–9, 13 and 15), additional vocal engineering (track 3)
- Tobin Esperance – bass guitar (track 12)
- Ron Fair – executive production, production (track 13), additional vocal production (track 5), piano (track 7)
- Fergie – vocals (tracks 1–5, 8–11, 13 and 14)
- Mike Fratantuno – bass guitar (tracks 1–3, 6, 13–15; guitarrón (track 7), double bass (track 13), acoustic guitar (track 13)
- Brian "Big Bass" Gardner – mastering
- Keith Harris – drums, percussion, keyboards
- Tal Herzberg – additional engineering (tracks 5 and 13)
- Jerry Horton – guitar (track 12)
- Tippa Irie – vocals (track 4)
- Jun Ishizeki – engineering (track 10)
- Markus Klinko – photography
- Chris Lord-Alge – mixing (track 12)
- John Legend – vocals (track 10)
- Tony Maserati – mixing (tracks 1–9, 11, 13–15)
- Sérgio Mendes – piano (track 8)
- Debi Nova – vocals (track 7)
- Tim Orindgreff – horns (track 2), saxophone (track 7), flute (track 7)
- George Pajon – guitar (tracks 1, 3, 5–8, 10, 13 and 15)
- Indrani Pal-Chaudhuri – photography
- Chuck Prada – percussion (tracks 7 and 14)
- Dante Santiago – backing vocals (tracks 1, 3, 4, 6, 10, 14 and 15), vocals (track 7), A&R artist coordination
- Noelle Scaggs – backing vocals (tracks 3 and 6)
- Jacoby Shaddix – vocals (track 12)
- Christine Sirois – engineering assistance (tracks 1, 5–7 and 13)
- Taboo – vocals (tracks 1–3, 5–7, 9 and 13)
- Justin Timberlake – vocals (track 13)
- Jason Villaroman – engineering (track 11)
- will.i.am – vocals (tracks 1–10, 12–15), Moog synthesizer (tracks 1, 4, 5, 8–11 and 13), drum programming (tracks 1, 4, 6–10), clavinet (tracks 12 and 13), drums (track 2), piano (track 2), Wurlitzer electric piano (track 4), synthesizer (track 10), executive production, production (all tracks), engineering (tracks 2–4, 8, 9, 12 and 14), mixing (tracks 10 and 14)
- Terence Yoshiaki – drums (tracks 3 and 7), percussion

== Charts ==
=== Weekly charts ===
2003–2004 weekly chart performance
Chart	Peak position
Argentine Albums (CAPIF)	6
Australian Albums (ARIA)	1
Australian Urban Albums (ARIA)	1
Austrian Albums (Ö3 Austria)	3
Belgian Albums (Ultratop Flanders)	5
Belgian Albums (Ultratop Wallonia)	6
Canadian Albums (Billboard)	2
Canadian R&B Albums (Nielsen SoundScan)	1
Danish Albums (Hitlisten)	3
Dutch Albums (Album Top 100)	5
European Top 100 Albums (Billboard)	2
Finnish Albums (Suomen virallinen lista)	3
French Albums (SNEP)	2
German Albums (Offizielle Top 100)	6
Greek International Albums (IFPI)	6
Hungarian Albums (MAHASZ)	11
Irish Albums (IRMA)	8
Italian Albums (FIMI)	6
New Zealand Albums (RMNZ)	2
Norwegian Albums (VG-lista)	2
Polish Albums (ZPAV)	41
Portuguese Albums (AFP)	3
Scottish Albums (Official Charts)	2
South African Albums (RISA)	4
Spanish Albums (AFYVE)	10
Swedish Albums (Sverigetopplistan)	5
Swiss Albums (Schweizer Hitparade)	1
UK Albums (Official Charts)	3
UK R&B Albums (Official Charts)	1
US Billboard 200	14
US Top R&B/Hip-Hop Albums (Billboard)	23

=== Year-end charts ===
2003 year-end chart performance
Chart	Position
Australian Albums (ARIA)	44
New Zealand Albums (RMNZ)	19
Swedish Albums (Sverigetopplistan)	56
Swiss Albums (Schweizer Hitparade)	62
UK Albums (OCC)	13
US Billboard 200	127
Worldwide Albums (IFPI)	29

2004 year-end chart performance
Chart	Position
Australian Albums (ARIA)	9
Austrian Albums (Ö3 Austria)	19
Belgian Albums (Ultratop Flanders)	22
Belgian Albums (Ultratop Wallonia)	33
Dutch Albums (Album Top 100)	12
European Top 100 Albums (Billboard)	3
French Albums (SNEP)	12
German Albums (Offizielle Top 100)	15
Hungarian Albums (MAHASZ)	64
Italian Albums (FIMI)	29
New Zealand Albums (RMNZ)	4
South Korean International Albums (RIAK)	15
Swedish Albums (Sverigetopplistan)	75
Swiss Albums (Schweizer Hitparade)	6
UK Albums (OCC)	26
US Billboard 200	35
US Top R&B/Hip-Hop Albums (Billboard)	48
Worldwide Albums (IFPI)	12

2005 year-end chart performance
Chart	Position
French Albums (SNEP)	147
UK Albums (OCC)	183
US Billboard 200	115

=== Decade-end charts ===
2000s decade-end chart performance
Chart	Position
Australian Albums (ARIA)	33
UK Albums (OCC)	56
US Billboard 200	160

== Certifications ==
Certifications and sales
Region	Certification	Certified units/sales
Argentina (CAPIF)	Platinum	40,000^{^}
Australia (ARIA)	4× Platinum	280,000^{^}
Austria (IFPI Austria)	Gold	15,000^{*}
Brazil (Pro-Música Brasil)	Gold	50,000^{*}
Canada (Music Canada)	7× Platinum	700,000^{^}
Denmark (IFPI Danmark)	4× Platinum	80,000^{‡}
Finland (Musiikkituottajat)	Gold	23,541
France (SNEP)	Platinum	300,000^{*}
Germany (BVMI)	Platinum	200,000^{^}
Ireland (IRMA)	2× Platinum	30,000^{^}
Italy (FIMI) sales since 2009	Gold	25,000^{‡}
Japan (RIAJ)	Gold	100,000^{^}
Mexico (AMPROFON)	Platinum	150,000^{^}
Netherlands (NVPI)	2× Platinum	160,000^{^}
New Zealand (RMNZ)	4× Platinum	60,000^{^}
Norway (IFPI Norway)	Gold	20,000^{*}
Portugal (AFP)	Gold	20,000^{^}
Russia (NFPF)	3× Platinum	60,000^{*}
South Korea	—	26,552
Spain (Promusicae)	Platinum	100,000^{^}
Sweden (GLF)	Gold	30,000^{^}
Switzerland (IFPI Switzerland)	Platinum	40,000^{^}
United Kingdom (BPI)	5× Platinum	1,500,000^{^}
United States (RIAA)	4× Platinum	4,000,000^{‡}
Summaries
Europe (IFPI)	3× Platinum	3,000,000^{*}
Worldwide	—	9,000,000
^{*} Sales figures based on certification alone.^{^} Shipments figures based on certification alone.^{‡} Sales+streaming figures based on certification alone.

== Release history ==
Release dates and formats
Region	Date	Edition(s)	Format(s)	Label(s)	Ref.
Canada	June 24, 2003	Standard	CD	Universal	
United States	June 24, 2003	Standard	CD	A&M; Interscope; will.i.am	
Australia	July 7, 2003	Standard	CD	Universal	
France	July 11, 2003	Standard	CD	Polydor	
South Korea	August 7, 2003	Standard	Cassette; CD	Universal	
United Kingdom	August 11, 2003	Standard	CD	Polydor	
Japan	August 20, 2003	Standard	CD	Universal	
Poland	September 11, 2003	Standard	CD	Universal	
Germany	September 22, 2003	Standard	CD	Universal	
Argentina	November 18, 2003	Standard	CD	Universal	
Hong Kong	February 26, 2004	Special	CD+VCD	Universal	
United States	May 24, 2004	Reissue	CD	A&M; Interscope; will.i.am	
France	August 9, 2004	Reissue	CD	Polydor	
Various	September 30, 2016	Standard	Vinyl	Interscope	
Various	April 1, 2022	Revised	Digital download; streaming	Interscope	
Various	December 8, 2023	Expanded	Digital download; streaming	Interscope	
Various	February 14, 2025	Revised	Vinyl	Interscope	

== See also ==
- Black Eyed Peas discography
- List of UK R&B Albums Chart number ones of 2003
- List of number-one albums of 2004 (Australia)
