= Behind the Front =

1998 studio album by Black Eyed Peas

Studio album by Black Eyed Peas
- Released: June 30, 1998
- Recorded: 1997–1998
- Genre: Alternative hip-hop
- Length: 73:53
- Labels: Interscope; will.i.am
- Producers: will.i.am; Paul Poli; C-Los; Brian Lapin

Black Eyed Peas chronology
Behind the Front (1998)	Bridging the Gap (2000)

Singles from Behind the Front
- 1. "Fallin' Up" Released: December 3, 1997; 2. "Joints & Jam" Released: November 9, 1998; 3. "Karma" Released: April 6, 1999

Behind the Front is the debut studio album by American hip-hop group Black Eyed Peas. It was released on June 30, 1998, through Interscope Records and will.i.am Music Group.

== Background ==
Most of the tracks were demos for the Grass Roots album, with added verses by new member Taboo. The song "Joints & Jam" appeared on the soundtrack of the movie Bulworth, where it was billed as "Joints & Jams". "Be Free" was featured in the film She's All That. On the back cover, "Skit 3" is listed after "Duet", when it actually appears after "Communication". This was their only album to be released in a Parental Advisory version and a censored version until the release of Masters of the Sun Vol. 1 (2018). On the edited version's back cover, "Skit 3" is properly listed after "Communication".

== Release and promotion ==
Behind the Front was released for vinyl on June 30, 1998, through Interscope Records, will.i.am's imprint will.i.am Music Group and Universal Music Group.

Three singles from the album were released–double single "Fallin' Up/¿Que Dices?" in December 1997, "Joints & Jam" in November 1998, and the final single "Karma" in April 1999.

In 1997, a music video for the song "Head Bobs" was filmed and finished; however, the band decided not to release the song as a single. Around the same time, a music video for the song "Fallin' Up" was also created; however, it was decided that the album's first official single would be "Joints & Jam", with its respective music video released. A similar video to "Joints & Jam" was filmed for the song "What It Is", but like "Head Bobs" and "Fallin' Up", the song wasn't an official single. The last music video to be released from the album was "Karma", the album's second and final official single. All five music videos were included on the DVD Behind the Bridge to Elephunk (2004).

== Critical reception ==
Professional ratings
Review scores
Source	Rating
AllMusic	3.5/5 stars
Christgau's Consumer Guide	(neither)
Melody Maker	4/5 stars
RapReviews	8.5/10
Rolling Stone	3/5 stars
The Rolling Stone Album Guide	3/5 stars
The Source	3/5 stars

Behind the Front received generally favorable reviews from music critics. Matt Conaway of AllMusic stated: "Black Eyed Peas bring some positivity and fun back into hip-hop. Musically there is almost no realm this group does not touch – right from the jump, the stylistic innocence of "Fallin Up," complete with striking guitar licks, sums up what BEP is all about." Marcus Reeves of Rolling Stone gave the album three out of five stars, stating: "Behind the Front, offers an organic mixture of sampled melodies and live instruments aimed at those of us seeking a little enlightenment with our well-oiled boogie." Tony Green of JazzTimes also proclaimed that Black Eyed Peas "provide a musical hip-hop shot that rises beyond mere discussions of consciousness" which "sounds, well dope, with a live band accentuated by clever samples."

== Track listing ==
All tracks are produced by will.i.am, except where noted.

No.	Title	Writer(s)	Producers	Length
1.	"Fallin' Up" (contains "Skit 1"; featuring Sierra Swan & Planet Swan)	William Adams; Allan Pineda; Jaime Gomez; Kevin Feyen; Brian Lapin		5:09
2.	"Clap Your Hands" (featuring Dawn Beckman)	Adams; Pineda; Gomez; Joseph "Zigaboo" Modeliste; Arthur Neville; Leo Nocentelli; George Porter, Jr.		4:57
3.	"Joints & Jam" (featuring Ingrid Dupree)	Adams; Pineda; Gomez; Paul Poli; Gregory Phillinganes; Bary Gibb; Trevor Smith	Paul Poli; will.i.am^{[a]}	3:35
4.	"The Way U Make Me Feel" (featuring Kim Hill)	Adams; Hill; Carlos Guaico	C-Los; will.i.am^{[a]}	4:19
5.	"Movement" (contains "Skit 2")	Adams; Pineda; Gomez; Feyen; Lapin; Mike Fratantuno; Terence Yoshiaka		4:42
6.	"Karma" (featuring Einstein Brown)	Adams; Pineda; Feyen; Debbie Harry; Nigel Harrison		4:28
7.	"Be Free" (featuring Kim Hill)	Adams; Pineda; Tim Peter Stahl; John Goldberg		4:06
8.	"Say Goodbye" (featuring Dawn Beckman)	Adams; Pineda; Gomez; Feyen; Lapin; Michael Oliver		4:01
9.	"Duet" (featuring Redfoo)	Adams; Pineda; Stefan Kendal Gordy; Lapin; Feyen	will.i.am; Lapin^{[a]}	4:21
10.	"Communication" (contains "Skit 3")	Adams; Pineda; Feyen; Fratantuno; Yoshiaka		5:41
11.	"What It Is" (featuring Kim Hill)	Adams; Pineda; Fratantuno; Tom Browne; Trevor Smith		4:45
12.	"¿Que Dices?"	Adams; Pineda; Gomez; Feyen; Lapin		4:01
13.	"A8"	Adams; Pineda; Gomez; Feyen; Fratantuno		3:52
14.	"Love Won't Wait" (featuring Macy Gray)	Adams; Pineda; Gray; Feyen; Lapin		3:35
15.	"Head Bobs"	Adams; Pineda; Feyen; Lapin	Lapin; will.i.am^{[a]}	4:14
16.	"Positivity" (includes hidden outro)	Adams; Pineda; Gomez; Feyen; Lapin; Fratantuno		8:07

Notes

- ^{[a]} signifies a co-producer

== Personnel ==
- will.i.am – vocals on all tracks; MPC 3000 on tracks 1–3, 5, 6, 8–14 and 16; Fender Rhodes on tracks 8 and 16; Hammond b3 organ on tracks 2, 10 and 13; Moog on track 9; theremin on track 12; marimbas on track 9; melody phone on track 16
- apl.de.ap – vocals on all tracks except 4
- Taboo – vocals on all tracks except 4, 7, 9 and 15

Musicians

- Kevin Feyen – guitar on tracks 1, 5, 6, and 8–16
- Mike Fratantuno – bass on tracks 1–3, 5, 8, 10, 11, 13 and 16
- Terrence Yoshiaka – drums on track 5; percussion on tracks 1 and 6
- Brian Lapin – Rhodes on tracks 1, 5, 9, 11, 12 and 15; Hammond b3 organ on track 11; bass on track 9; Moog on tracks 9, 11 and 16
- Ramy Antoun – congas on track 6
- Darell Cross – drums on track 15
- J. Curtis – guitar on track 4
- DJ Drez – turntables on track 15
- Carlos Guacio – Rhodes and bass on track 4
- Peter Kim – bass on track 15
- DJ Motiv8 – turntables on tracks 3 and 8
- Matt Nabours – violin on track 14
- Tommy O. – flute on track 14
- Paul Poli – turntables on track 3 and 7
- Miles Tackett – bass on track 14 and cello on track 5

Guest vocals

- Kim Hill – tracks 4, 7 and 11
- Dawn Beckman – tracks 2 and 8
- Einstein Brown – track 6
- Ingrid Dupree – track 3
- Redfoo – rap (track 9)
- Macy Gray – track 14
- Sierra Swan & Planet Swan – track 1

== Charts ==
Chart (1998)	Peak position
US Billboard 200	129
US Heatseekers Albums (Billboard)	3
US Top R&B/Hip-Hop Albums (Billboard)	37

Chart (2009)	Peak position
French Albums (SNEP)	149
