= Karma (Black Eyed Peas song) =

Single by Black Eyed Peas featuring Einstein Brown

from the album Behind the Front
- B-side: "One Way"
- Released: April 6, 1999
- Recorded: 1998
- Genre: Alternative hip hop
- Length: 4:28
- Label: Interscope; A&M; will.i.am
- Songwriters: Will Adams; Allan Pineda; Kevin Feyen; Debbie Harry; Nigel Harrison
- Producer: will.i.am

Black Eyed Peas singles chronology
"Joints & Jam" (1998)	"Karma" (1999)	"BEP Empire/Get Original" (2000)

"Karma" is the third and final single from the Black Eyed Peas' debut studio album, Behind the Front. The lyrics in the bridge are taken from Blondie's "One Way or Another" while the main riff and hook are taken from Cheo Feliciano’s El Ratón. The song features vocals from Einstein Brown. Kim Hill does not perform on the song, but is featured in the music video.

== Music video ==
The video was filmed in 1998, but wasn't released until March 1999. In the music video, will.i.am is in hospital because his left shoulder is badly wounded. A doctor tells him all the doctors are unavailable, so he looks for another doctor. Will sees a man get off his wheelchair and strangle another patient, all the doctors and nurses try to get him off while will.i.am is trying to get past, he knocks over a tray of pills. Kim Hill pushes will.i.am out of the way to get to a patient. While will.i.am is rapping his verse, apl.de.ap is seen pushing a bed with a blue blanket over the body and Taboo is seen in a safety mask and a white scarf on his head. When the chorus starts again, will.i.am is back to where he came from, and the same thing happens again; apl sings the verse this time round. When will.i.am is back to where was started for the third time, he gets fed up, and leaves. We see everything happen for the third time, will.i.am walks through another door and notices that he's stuck in the hospital. Taboo then says to will.i.am, "You can't run away." Einstein Brown is shown with a knife is then seen singing "One Way or Another" with Taboo. Will falls on the floor and starts to crawl and the pills fall on him. The video ends as one of the nurses steps over Will.

== Track listings ==
1. "Karma" (LP Version) - 4:27
2. "One Way" (Karma Remix) - 4:28
3. "Karma" (Live In Los Feliz, California) - 3:16
4. "Karma" (Clean Version) - 4:27

== Charts ==
Chart (1999)	Peak position
Netherlands (Single Top 100)	93
