= List of number-one singles of 2003 (Ireland) =

The following is a list of the IRMA's number-one singles of 2003.

Issue date	Song	Artist	ref
4 January	"Lose Yourself"	Eminem	
11 January	"Sound of the Underground"	Girls Aloud	
18 January	"Sound of the Underground"	Girls Aloud	
25 January	"Sound of the Underground"	Girls Aloud	
1 February	"All the Things She Said"	t.A.T.u.	
8 February	"All the Things She Said"	t.A.T.u.	
15 February	"All the Things She Said"	t.A.T.u.	
22 February	"All the Things She Said"	t.A.T.u.	
1 March	"Beautiful"	Christina Aguilera	
8 March	"Beautiful"	Christina Aguilera	
15 March	"Beautiful"	Christina Aguilera	
22 March	"Beautiful"	Christina Aguilera	
29 March	"Tonight"	Westlife	
5 April	"A Better Plan"	Simon Casey	
12 April	"A Better Plan"	Simon Casey	
19 April	"A Better Plan"	Simon Casey	
26 April	"In da Club"	50 Cent	
3 May	"We've Got the World"	Mickey Harte	
10 May	"We've Got the World"	Mickey Harte	
17 May	"We've Got the World"	Mickey Harte	
24 May	"We've Got the World"	Mickey Harte	
31 May	"We've Got the World"	Mickey Harte	
7 June	"Ignition"	R. Kelly	
14 June	"Ignition"	R. Kelly	
21 June	"Ignition"	R. Kelly	
28 June	"May We Never Have to Say Goodbye"	Ronan Tynan and Rita Connolly	
5 July	"May We Never Have to Say Goodbye"	Ronan Tynan and Rita Connolly	
12 July	"Crazy in Love"	Beyoncé featuring Jay-Z	
19 July	"Crazy in Love"	Beyoncé featuring Jay-Z	
26 July	"Crazy in Love"	Beyoncé featuring Jay-Z	
2 August	"Crazy in Love"	Beyoncé featuring Jay-Z	
9 August	"Fly on the Wings of Love"	XTM and DJ Chucky presents Annia	
16 August	"Fly on the Wings of Love"	XTM and DJ Chucky presents Annia	
23 August	"Breathe"	Blu Cantrell featuring Sean Paul	
30 August	"Breathe"	Blu Cantrell featuring Sean Paul	
6 September	"Where Is the Love?"	The Black Eyed Peas	
13 September	"Where Is the Love?"	The Black Eyed Peas	
20 September	"Where Is the Love?"	The Black Eyed Peas	
27 September	"Where Is the Love?"	The Black Eyed Peas	
4 October	"Where Is the Love?"	The Black Eyed Peas	
11 October	"Where Is the Love?"	The Black Eyed Peas	
18 October	"Where Is the Love?"	The Black Eyed Peas	
25 October	"Where Is the Love?"	The Black Eyed Peas	
1 November	"Where Is the Love?"	The Black Eyed Peas	
8 November	"Be Faithful"	Fatman Scoop featuring The Crooklyn Clan	
15 November	"Me Against the Music"	Britney Spears featuring Madonna	
22 November	"Mandy"	Westlife	
29 November	"Mandy"	Westlife	
6 December	"Mandy"	Westlife	
13 December	"Shut Up"	The Black Eyed Peas	
20 December	"Leave Right Now"	Will Young	
27 December	"Leave Right Now"	Will Young	

== See also ==
- 2003 in music
- List of artists who reached number one in Ireland
