= Zoom (Dr. Dre song) =

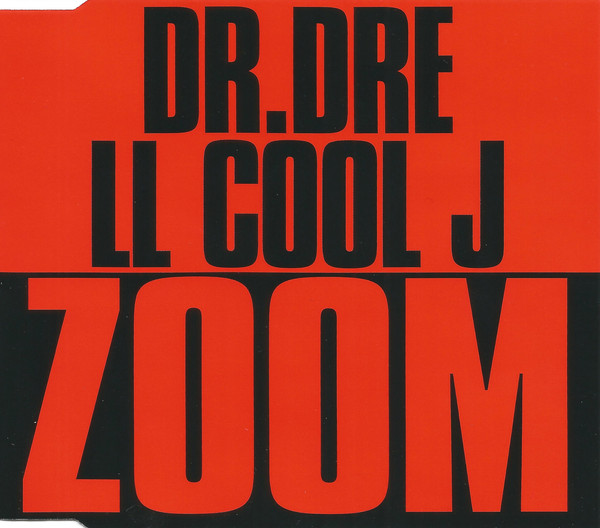

Single by Dr. Dre and LL Cool J

from the album Bulworth O.S.T.
- Released: April 24, 1998
- Recorded: 1998
- Genre: Hip hop
- Length: 4:15
- Label: Interscope
- Songwriters: Andre Young; James Smith; Stocks McGuire; Tupac Shakur; Christopher Wallace
- Producer: Dr. Dre (exec.)

Dr. Dre singles chronology
"Ghetto Fabulous" (1998)	"Zoom" (1998)	"Guilty Conscience" (1999)

LL Cool J singles chronology
"Hot, Hot, Hot" (1998)	"Zoom" (1998)	"Candy" (1998)

"Zoom" is a single by American rappers Dr. Dre and LL Cool J, recorded for and taken from the soundtrack to the film Bulworth.

== Background ==
Produced by Dre, this is the only collaboration between both rappers. It uses a sample from Quincy Jones' song, "Ironside". Additionally, the verse "I got my mind made up, come on, come on, get in, get in to it, let it ride, tonight's the night" is from 'Got My Mind Made Up' by 2Pac, while the "Zoom Zoom" part is a sample from a 17 year old Craig Mack's “Get Retarded,” as part of MC EZ & Troup. The instrumental was originally recorded and intended for the unreleased Snoop Dogg and Dr. Dre collaboration album 'Break Up To Make Up'. The beat was then used for King Tee for his semi-unreleased album 'Thy Kingdom Come', on the track "6 N' Na Moe'nin", featuring the vocals of Dawn Robinson. Again, the album was shelved and the song was re-recorded featuring LL Cool J. The original version featuring Snoop Dogg can be found on the internet in low quality, as can the King Tee version.

== Track listing ==
- CD single
1. "Zoom" (Radio Edit) – 4:15
2. "Zoom" (LP Version) – 4:15
3. "Zoom" (Instrumental) – 4:15
- 12" vinyl
1. "Zoom" (Radio Edit) – 4:15
2. "Zoom" (LP Version) – 4:15
3. "Zoom" (Instrumental) – 4:15
4. "Zoom" (Acapella) – 4:15

== Chart positions ==
Chart (1998)	Peak position
U.S. Billboard Hot R&B/Hip-Hop Airplay	#52
U.S. Billboard Bubbling Under R&B/Hip-Hop Singles	#1
U.K. Singles Chart	#15
