= Joints & Jam =

Single by the Black Eyed Peas featuring Ingrid Dupree

from the album Behind the Front & Bulworth: The Soundtrack
- B-side: "What It Is", "Leave It All Behind"
- Released: November 9, 1998
- Recorded: 1998
- Length: 3:35
- Label: Interscope
- Songwriters: Will Adams, Jaime Gomez, Allan Pineda, Paul Poli, G. Phillinganes, B. Gibb, T. Smith
- Producers: Paul Poli, will.i.am

Black Eyed Peas singles chronology
"Fallin' Up/¿Que Dices?" (1998)	"Joints & Jam" (1998)	"Karma" (1999)

Alternative cover
- European cover

Music video
- "The Black Eyed Peas - Joints & Jam" on YouTube

"Joints & Jam" is the second single by American hip hop group the Black Eyed Peas, taken from their debut studio album, Behind the Front. The song features the vocals of Ingrid Dupree. The song is featured in the Bulworth soundtrack. A remix of this song, titled "That's the Joint", appears on the group's fifth studio album, The E.N.D. The song samples "Love Till the End of Time" by Paulinho da Costa and Hill sings a reworking of Frankie Valli's "Grease". The song was sampled in the Nextmen's "Amongst the Madness" which appeared in the classic video game Tony Hawk's Pro Skater 3.

== Music video ==
The music video starts with will.i.am standing outside an arts and crafts store. A boy comes up holding a speaker, which he holds up to the screen. will.i.am sees this and tries to take the speaker, but it is stuck to the screen. Once he gets it off, he himself gets sucked into the screen. While will.i.am is singing his verse, apl.de.ap and Taboo see him stuck to the screen, they also get stuck to the screen and drop all their food and drinks. Kim Hill is seen in the video but she and the other people in the background do not get stuck to the screen. At the end of the video, a remix of "Fallin' Up" featuring a sample from Barry White's version of "Standing in the Shadows of Love" begins and the three members of Black Eyed Peas are seen house dancing.

== Track listings ==
Europe

1. "Joints & Jam" (Clean) – 3:22
2. "Joints & Jam" (LP Version) – 3:37
3. "What It Is" – 3:23
4. "Leave It All Behind" – 4:40

United Kingdom

1. "Joints & Jam" (Clean) – 3:22
2. "Joints & Jam" (LP Version) – 3:37
3. "Joints & Jam" (Instant Flava Mix) – 3:23

America

1. "Joints & Jam" (Billion Mix) – 3:22
2. "Joints & Jam" (The Joint Mix) – 3:37
3. "Joints & Jam" (Instant Flava Mix) – 2:23

== Charts ==
Chart (1998)	Peak
UK Singles (OCC)	53
US Rhythmic Airplay (Billboard)	39
