= Bulworth (soundtrack) =

Bulworth: The Soundtrack

Soundtrack album by Various Artists
- Released: April 21, 1998
- Recorded: 1997
- Genre: Hip hop
- Length: 58:53
- Label: Interscope
- Producers: Robert Kraft (exec.); Karyn Rachtman (exec.); RZA; Wyclef Jean; Jerry Duplessis; Chris "The Glove" Taylor; DJ Muggs; Don White; Dr. Dre; Eddie B; Emperor Searcy; Gary G-Wiz; Ice Cube; Mel-Man; Paul Poli; Pras; Robert McDowell; Teddy Riley; The Psycho Ward; Ché Guevara (co.); Eric Bobo (co.); will.i.am (co.)

Singles from Bulworth
- 1. "Zoom" Released: April 24, 1998; 2. "Ghetto Supastar (That Is What You Are)" Released: June 6, 1998; 3. "Joints & Jam" Released: November 9, 1998

Professional ratings
Review scores
Source	Rating
AllMusic	3/5 stars
The A.V. Club	N/A
Entertainment Weekly	B
Robert Christgau	B+

Bulworth: The Soundtrack is the soundtrack to Warren Beatty's 1998 film Bulworth. It was released on April 21, 1998, via Interscope Records and consists of hip hop music. The album is composed of fourteen songs and features performances by the likes of B-Real, Canibus, Dr. Dre, Eve, Ice Cube, Kam, KRS-One, LL Cool J, Mack 10, Mýa, Pras, Prodigy, Public Enemy, The Black Eyed Peas, Witchdoctor, Youssou N'Dour, and Wu-Tang Clan's Cappadonna, Method Man, Ol' Dirty Bastard and RZA, among others.

The album peaked at number 10 in the United States, at number 17 in New Zealand, at number 39 in Austria and at number 98 in Germany.

In 2012, Complex placed the album at No. 24 on their 'The 25 Best Hip-Hop Movie Soundtracks Of All Time'.

== Track listing ==
No.	Title	Writer(s)	Producer(s)	Length
1.	"Zoom" (performed by Dr. Dre and LL Cool J)	J. Smith; R. Vick; A. Young; C. Taylor	Dr. Dre; Chris "The Glove" Taylor	4:15
2.	"Ghetto Supastar (That Is What You Are)" (performed by Pras, Ol' Dirty Bastard and Mýa)	P. Michel; R. Jones; N. Jean; B. Gibb; M. Gibb; R. Gibb	Wyclef Jean; Pras; Jerry Duplessis (co.); Che Pope (co.)	4:26
3.	"How Come" (performed by Canibus and Youssou N'Dour)	G. Williams; Y. N'Dour; N. Jean; J. Duplessis	Wyclef Jean; Jerry Duplessis	4:08
4.	"Bulworth (They Talk About It While We Live It)" (performed by Method Man, KRS-One, Prodigy and Kam)	C. Smith; L. Parker; A. Johnson; C. Miller; L. Muggerud	DJ Muggs	4:24
5.	"Holiday/12 Scanner" (performed by Witchdoctor)	E. Johnson; D. Searcy; R. McDowell; W. Butler; J. Butler	R.O.B.; Emperor Searcy	4:48
6.	"The Chase" (performed by RZA)	R. Diggs	RZA	4:12
7.	"Eve of Destruction" (performed by Eve)	E. Jeffers; M. Bradford	Mel-Man	3:50
8.	"Maniac in the Brainiac" (performed by Mack 10 and Ice Cube)	D. Rolison; O. Jackson	Ice Cube; Binky Mack	4:36
9.	"Freak Out" (performed by Nutta Butta and Anonymous)	T. Gaither; E. Riley	Teddy Riley	4:56
10.	"Joints & Jam" (performed by The Black Eyed Peas and Ingrid Dupree)	W. Adams; A. Pineda; J. Gomez; P. Poli; B. Gibb; G. Phillinganes	Paul Poli; will.i.am (co.)	3:33
11.	"Run" (performed by Cappadonna)	D. Hill; R. Diggs	RZA	4:42
12.	"Lunatics in the Grass" (performed by B-Real & Sick Jacken)	L. Freese; J. Gonzalez	The Psycho Ward; Eric Bobo (co.)	3:31
13.	"Kill Em Live" (performed by Public Enemy)	C. Ridenhour; G. Rinaldo	Gary G-Wiz	3:26
14.	"Bitches Are Hustlers Too" (performed by D-Fyne)	B. Major; D. Saulsberry; J. Ward; O. Ratliff	Don White; Eddie B	4:06
Total length:				58:53

== Charts ==
=== Weekly charts ===
Chart (1998)	Peak position
Austrian Albums (Ö3 Austria)	39
Canada Top Albums/CDs (RPM)	4
Canadian R&B Albums (SoundScan)	1
German Albums (Offizielle Top 100)	98
New Zealand Albums (RMNZ)	17
US Billboard 200	10
US Top R&B/Hip-Hop Albums (Billboard)	4

=== Year-end charts ===
Chart (1998)	Position
Canada Top Albums/CDs (RPM)	30
Canadian Albums (SoundScan)	39
Canadian R&B Albums (SoundScan)	4
US Billboard 200	68
US Top R&B/Hip-Hop Albums (Billboard)	44

== Certifications ==
Region	Certification	Certified units/sales
Canada (Music Canada)	2× Platinum	200,000^{^}
United States (RIAA)	Platinum	1,000,000^{^}
^{^} Shipments figures based on certification alone.
