= Transcenders =

American music production company

Transcenders is an American music production company established in 2002 by Brian Lapin, Terence Yoshiaki, and Mike Fratantuno. The latter two have previously co-written several songs for the hip-hop group Black Eyed Peas, including "Let's Get It Started", "Request + Line", and "Where Is the Love?"

Transcenders composed the title song for Gossip Girl as well as music for the fictional rock group led by Rufus Humphrey.

== Selected credits ==
=== Film ===
Year	Title	Notes
2006	Bring It On: All or Nothing	Original score
2007	Bring It On: In It to Win It	Original score
2008	College	Original score
2009	Road Trip: Beer Pong	Original score
2010	Our Family Wedding	Original score
2011	Mean Girls 2	Original score
2013	I Know That Voice	Original score

=== Television ===
Year	Title	Notes
2004–06	20/20	Main title
2006–07	Watch Over Me	Main title
2007	Power Rangers: Operation Overdrive	Main title
2007–2012	Gossip Girl	Series composers Original score Main title
2009	20Q	Theme music
2010	100 Questions	Series composers Original score Main title
2010–11	Outsourced	Series composers Original score
2014–19	Madam Secretary	Series somposers Original score Main title
