= Hey Mama (Black Eyed Peas song) =

2004 single by the Black Eyed Peas

Single by the Black Eyed Peas

from the album Elephunk
- B-side: "Positivity" (live); "Release" (live); "The Boogie That Be"
- Released: January 12, 2004
- Recorded: March 7–8, 2003
- Studio: The Stewchia (Los Feliz, Los Angeles, US)
- Length: 3:48
- Label: A&M; will.i.am; Interscope
- Songwriters: Will Adams; Anthony Henry; Allan Pineda; Jaime Gomez
- Producer: will.i.am

The Black Eyed Peas singles chronology
"Shut Up" (2003)	"Hey Mama" (2004)	"Let's Get It Started" (2004)

Music video
- "Hey Mama" on YouTube

"Hey Mama" is a song by American musical group the Black Eyed Peas with additional vocals provided by British reggae singer Tippa Irie. It was released in 2004 as the third single from their third studio album, Elephunk (2003), and became a top-10 hit in 14 countries, including Australia, Canada, Germany, New Zealand, Switzerland, and the United Kingdom.

== Recording and release ==
"Hey Mama" was recorded from March 7 to 8, 2003, at The Stewchia in Los Feliz, Los Angeles. The single version of the song differs from the album version in that it cuts a verse from the end of the song and replaces it with an entirely new one performed by Black Eyed Peas members Taboo and apl.de.ap (both of whom did not perform on the original album version), changes some of the lyrics by removing references to the Middle East due to the Iraq War at the time and slightly alters the instrumental.

"Hey Mama" reached No. 3 in Switzerland and No. 4 in Australia, Austria, and New Zealand. In the United Kingdom, it peaked No. 6, becoming their third top-ten hit there, and was also a success in Canada and the United States, reaching No. 9 on the Canadian Singles Chart and No. 23 on the US Billboard Hot 100.

== Music video ==
The Black Eyed Peas in the psychedelic limbo from the music video.

The music video features three main locations, the first shown being a psychedelic limbo, where the Black Eyed Peas do breakdancing and the main verse of the song is sung. The color scheme is mostly yellow, red, brown and off-white. The second is the vertically-black-and-white striped canvas-room. A few parts are sung in here, but the main one is the one featuring Fergie. The third is the club dance scene, which has many background characters dancing.

Two versions of the video were made: one with apl.de.ap's and Taboo's rap verses and one without. Both versions add an instrumental breakdown to the end of the song.

== Track listings ==
UK CD1 and Australian CD single

1. "Hey Mama" – 3:48
2. "Positivity" (live from House of Blues, Chicago) – 4:58
3. "Release" (live from House of Blues, Chicago) – 3:07
4. "Hey Mama" (video)

UK CD2 and European CD single

1. "Hey Mama" – 3:48
2. "Positivity" (live from House of Blues, Chicago) – 4:58

UK 12-inch single

A1. "Hey Mama" – 3:46
B1. "Hey Mama" (instrumental) – 3:30
B2. "The Boogie That Be" – 5:12

== Personnel ==
Personnel are lifted from the Elephunk album booklet.

The Black Eyed Peas

- will.i.am – vocals, Moog synthesizer, drum programming, Wurlitzer electric piano, production, engineering
- Fergie – vocals
- Taboo – vocals (only on the single/radio version)
- apl.de.ap – vocals (only on the single/radio version)

Additional musicians

- Tippa Irie – vocals
- Dante Santiago – backing vocals

Production personnel

- Tony Maserati – mixing

== Charts ==
=== Weekly charts ===
Chart (2004)	Peak position
Australia (ARIA)	4
Australian Urban (ARIA)	2
Austria (Ö3 Austria Top 40)	4
Belgium (Ultratop 50 Flanders)	6
Belgium (Ultratop 50 Wallonia)	25
Canada (Nielsen SoundScan)	9
Canada CHR (Nielsen BDS)	2
Canada CHR/Pop Top 30 (Radio & Records)	2
CIS Airplay (TopHit)	106
Croatia (HRT)	3
Denmark (Tracklisten)	8
Eurochart Hot 100 (Billboard)	8
Finland (Suomen virallinen lista)	14
France (SNEP)	18
Germany (GfK)	5
Hungary (Rádiós Top 40)	26
Hungary (Dance Top 40)	1
Hungary (Single Top 40)	5
Ireland (IRMA)	5
Italy (FIMI)	8
Netherlands (Dutch Top 40)	5
Netherlands (Single Top 100)	6
New Zealand (Recorded Music NZ)	4
Norway (VG-lista)	6
Romania (Romanian Top 100)	93
Scottish Singles Sales (Official Charts)	5
Switzerland (Schweizer Hitparade)	3
UK Singles (Official Charts)	6
UK Hip Hop/R&B (Official Charts)	2
US Billboard Hot 100	23
US Pop Airplay (Billboard)	8
US Rhythmic Airplay (Billboard)	27

=== Year-end charts ===
Chart (2004)	Position
Australia (ARIA)	42
Australian Urban (ARIA)	18
Austria (Ö3 Austria Top 40)	42
Belgium (Ultratop 50 Flanders)	44
Belgium (Ultratop 50 Wallonia)	96
Germany (Media Control GfK)	47
Hungary (Rádiós Top 40)	95
Italy (FIMI)	34
Netherlands (Dutch Top 40)	57
Netherlands (Single Top 100)	75
New Zealand (RIANZ)	34
Switzerland (Schweizer Hitparade)	27
UK Singles (Official Charts)	79
US Billboard Hot 100	95
US Mainstream Top 40 (Billboard)	30

== Certifications ==
Certifications and sales
Region	Certification	Certified units/sales
Australia (ARIA)	Gold	35,000^{^}
New Zealand (RMNZ)	Gold	5,000^{*}
United Kingdom (BPI)	Silver	200,000^{‡}
United States (RIAA)	Platinum	1,000,000^{‡}
^{*} Sales figures based on certification alone.^{^} Shipments figures based on certification alone.^{‡} Sales+streaming figures based on certification alone.

== Release history ==
Release dates and formats for "Hey Mama"
Region	Date	Format(s)	Label(s)	Ref.
United States	January 12, 2004	Contemporary hit radio	A&M; Interscope	
United Kingdom	March 8, 2004	12-inch vinyl; CD	Polydor	
Germany	March 12, 2004	CD	Universal Music	
Australia	March 15, 2004	Maxi CD	Universal Music	
Germany	March 26, 2004	Maxi CD	Universal Music	
France	May 18, 2004	CD	Polydor	
United States	May 25, 2004	Digital download	A&M; Interscope	
