= Lanette Phillips =

American film and music video producer

- Occupations: Producer and executive producer
- Years active: 1998–present

Lanette Phillips is an American film and music video producer. Phillips’ feature producing credits include the Gary Baseman documentary, Mythical Creatures, which was selected for Sundance Institute New Frontier Story Lab and Sundance Institute Documentary Producers and Fellows Program.

== Biography ==
Phillips began her career as a music journalist, working with author Danny Sugerman, before moving into music video production at Propaganda Films. She teamed back up with Propaganda co-founder Sigurjón Sighvatsson at Palomar Pictures, where she launched and executive produced the music video division, creating videos for U2 and Gwen Stefani.

Phillips worked as executive producer at Neal Moritz's Original Film, home to director Larry Clark, and at A Band Apart, where she and Lawrence Bender launched a directors’ management division.

Phillips went on to form Lanette Phillips Management, representing directors including Jesse Dylan, and Keith Schofield.

In 2008, Phillips was invited to Iceland by Sigurjón Sighvatsson and Anna Hildur of the Icelandic Music Export to speak on a panel at the IMX- You are in Control conference during the Iceland Airwaves music festival. That same year, Phillips was asked to host an annual Icelandic music event in Los Angeles to introduce Icelandic artists to the film, TV, commercial, and music industries. The first annual event was held in her home in 2009 and co-hosted by Jónsi of Sigur Rós. Performers included Haukur Heiðar Hauksson from Dikta, and Lay Low. In 2010, Emiliana Torrini performed, and Ólöf Arnalds appeared in 2011. In 2012, Sigtryggur Baldursson from the Sugarcubes served as co-host, with Ólafur Arnalds performing.

Phillips was supervising producer and curator for the Stand Up To Cancer organization's Stand Up On Demand fundraising campaign with Comcast in 2009. In 2011, Phillips produced the short film, “Sabina,” for the Clinton Foundation which premiered at Bill Clinton's 65th birthday and Decade of Difference Concert at the Hollywood Bowl. Phillips also produced the Elizabeth Smart/Alicia Kozakiewicz public service announcement for “Not One More Child” which first aired on Good Morning America when Smart was interviewed by George Stephanopoulos.

== Filmography ==
- Producer, "Gary Baseman Documentary: Mythical Creatures" (2015)
- Music Supervisor, "Squatters" (2014)
- Producer, Buffalo Girls (2012)
- Executive Producer, The Sound of Heat (2011)
- Executive Producer, Midnight Club Trilogy (2010)
- Executive Producer, Warp20 New York (2009)
- Producer, "Stand Up to Cancer"- TV Movie (2009)
- Producer, Love is the Drug (2006)
- Executive Producer, Black Eyed Peas: Behind the Bridge to Elephunk (2004)
- Executive Producer, Tribute to Kurt Cobain (MTV Video Music Awards 1994)
