= Shut Up (Black Eyed Peas song) =

2003 single by the Black Eyed Peas

Single by the Black Eyed Peas

from the album Elephunk
- B-side: "Tell Your Mama Come"; "Karma"
- Released: September 8, 2003
- Recorded: December 30, 2001–February 19, 2002
- Studio: The Stewchia (Los Angeles)
- Length: 4:56 (album version); 3:46 (radio edit)
- Label: A&M; Interscope; will.i.am
- Songwriters: William Adams; Jaime Gomez; J. Curtis; George Pajon Jr.
- Producer: will.i.am

The Black Eyed Peas singles chronology
"Where Is the Love?" (2003)	"Shut Up" (2003)	"Hey Mama" (2004)

Music video
- "Shut Up" on YouTube

"Shut Up" is a song by American hip-hop group the Black Eyed Peas for their third studio album Elephunk (2003). Lyrically, it is about a disastrous courtship with the chorus consisting of the lines "Shut up, just shut up, shut up". The song was released as the second single from Elephunk on September 8, 2003, by A&M Records and Interscope Records. "Shut Up" was not commercially successful in the United States but became a hit internationally, topping the charts of Australia, New Zealand, and 12 European countries. It was Europe's second-biggest hit single of 2004.

== Background and release ==
"Shut Up" was Fergie's first collaboration with the Black Eyed Peas. She had previously met will.i.am in 2001, and was recommended for the project by a mutual friend after will.i.am mentioned needing a female vocalist for the song. After initially having low expectations, will.i.am was impressed with Fergie's vocals and they were completed in thirty minutes. Fergie assisted the group on most of the songs on Elephunk and became the group's fourth member in 2003. While will.i.am, apl.de.ap, and Taboo were working on the song, their girlfriends' phone calls would interrupt the session. Will said "The vibe was blown" and Taboo said "So we turned the negative into positive", by adding the problems they were having into the song they were making. "Shut Up" was recorded at The Stewchia in Los Feliz, Los Angeles, from December 30, 2001, to February 19, 2002.

The song's "Knee Deep Remix" includes a rerecorded version of will.i.am's verse and the bridge. It also includes a new verse with apl.de.ap. An edited version of this remix appears on the deluxe version of the group's 2009 fifth studio album, The E.N.D., titled "Shut the Phunk Up". The remix samples the song "(Not Just) Knee Deep" by Funkadelic. In December 2010, Funkadelic leader George Clinton filed a copyright infringement lawsuit against will.i.am, Fergie, and Universal Music. Clinton stated that he did not give his permission for the sample and that his signature was forged on the release form.

== Chart performance ==
"Shut Up" became an international success, reaching number one in Australia, Austria, Belgium (Flanders and Wallonia), the Czech Republic, France, Germany, Ireland, Italy, New Zealand, Norway, Romania, Sweden, and Switzerland. The single also reached number two in Denmark, the Netherlands, and the United Kingdom and peaked at number five in Hungary. At the end of 2004, it was ranked as Europe's second-highest-selling single according to the Eurochart Hot 100, on which the song peaked at number one. As of August 2014, it was the 47th best-selling single of the 21st century in France, with 400,000 units sold.

In Germany, it is the second-best-selling single of the band behind "I Gotta Feeling", selling 300,000 copies to reach platinum status. The song peaked at number one on the German Singles Chart and stayed there for five weeks, becoming the band's longest run at the pole position. In the United States, the song never charted on the Billboard Hot 100 despite appearing at number 30 on the Billboard Mainstream Top 40 in November 2003.

== Music video ==
The music video was directed by The Malloys and features an opera themed around a battle of the sexes. In it, will.i.am and Taboo play Fergie's suitors, and apl.de.ap is the conductor.

The music video has several Andre the Giant Has a Posse-style posters near the stage man. Two posters from the song "Where Is the Love?" are also shown. Kimberly Wyatt and Carmit Bachar from the Pussycat Dolls both make cameos in the video. Travis Barker from Blink-182, Shifty Shellshock from Crazy Town and French singer Afida Turner also have a cameo in the video.

== Track listings ==
US 12-inch vinyl

A1. "Shut Up" (LP) – 5:10
A2. "Shut Up" (radio edit) – 3:46
A3. "Shut Up" (instrumental) – 5:09
A4. "Shut Up" (acapella) – 4:55
B1. "Shut Up" (Knee Deep Remix) – 4:23
B2. "Shut Up" (Knee Deep Remix instrumental) – 4:21
B3. "Shut Up" (Knee Deep Remix acapella) – 4:20

European CD single

1. "Shut Up" – 5:12
2. "Tell Your Mama Come" (live from House of Blues, Chicago) – 2:51

UK and Australian CD single

1. "Shut Up" – 5:12
2. "Tell Your Mama Come" (live from the House of Blues, Chicago) – 2:52
3. "Karma" (live from the House of Blues, Chicago) – 3:05
4. "Shut Up" (video)

UK 12-inch single

A1. "Shut Up"
B1. "Tell Your Mama Come" (live from the House of Blues, Chicago)
B2. "Karma" (live from the House of Blues, Chicago)

== Personnel ==
The Black Eyed Peas

- will.i.am – vocals, Moog synthesizer, executive production, production
- Fergie – vocals
- Taboo – vocals
- apl.de.ap – vocals (Knee Deep/E.N.D. remix only)

Additional musicians

- George Pajon, Jr. – guitar
- J. Curtis – guitar
- Ray Brady – guitar

Production personnel

- Ron Fair – executive production, additional vocal production
- Dylan Dresdow – engineering
- Christine Sirois – engineering assistance
- Tony Maserati – mixing
- Brian Gardner – mastering
- Tal Herzberg – additional engineering

== Charts ==
=== Weekly charts ===
Weekly chart performance for "Shut Up"
Chart (2003–2004)	Peak position
Australia (ARIA)	1
Australian Urban (ARIA)	1
Austria (Ö3 Austria Top 40)	1
Belgium (Ultratop 50 Flanders)	1
Belgium (Ultratop 50 Wallonia)	1
Canada CHR (Nielsen BDS)	1
Croatia International (HRT)	2
Czech Republic (Rádio Top 100)	1
Denmark (Tracklisten)	2
Eurochart Hot 100 (Billboard)	1
Finland (Suomen virallinen lista)	12
France (SNEP)	1
Germany (GfK)	1
Hungary (Rádiós Top 40)	5
Hungary (Single Top 40)	5
Hungary (Dance Top 40)	1
Ireland (IRMA)	1
Italy (FIMI)	1
Netherlands (Dutch Top 40)	2
Netherlands (Single Top 100)	3
New Zealand (Recorded Music NZ)	1
Norway (VG-lista)	1
Poland (Polish Airplay Chart)	1
Romania (Romanian Top 100)	1
Scotland Singles (OCC)	2
Sweden (Sverigetopplistan)	1
Switzerland (Schweizer Hitparade)	1
UK Singles (OCC)	2
UK Hip Hop/R&B (OCC)	1
US Pop Airplay (Billboard)	30

=== Year-end charts ===
2003 year-end chart performance for "Shut Up"
Chart (2003)	Position
Australia (ARIA)	19
Australian Urban (ARIA)	12
Ireland (IRMA)	18
Sweden (Hitlistan)	47
UK Singles (OCC)	20

2004 year-end chart performance for "Shut Up"
Chart (2004)	Position
Australia (ARIA)	9
Australian Urban (ARIA)	3
Austria (Ö3 Austria Top 40)	4
Belgium (Ultratop 50 Flanders)	19
Belgium (Ultratop 50 Wallonia)	6
Brazil (Crowley)	5
Croatia International Airplay (HRT)	4
Eurochart Hot 100 (Billboard)	2
France (SNEP)	6
Germany (Media Control GfK)	6
Hungary (Rádiós Top 40)	9
Italy (FIMI)	5
Netherlands (Dutch Top 40)	25
Netherlands (Single Top 100)	17
New Zealand (RIANZ)	15
Sweden (Hitlistan)	28
Switzerland (Schweizer Hitparade)	2
UK Singles (OCC)	87

2005 year-end chart performance for "Shut Up"
Chart (2005)	Position
Hungary (Rádiós Top 40)	61

=== Decade-end charts ===
Decade-end chart performance for "Shut Up"
Chart (2000–2009)	Position
Australia (ARIA)	24
Germany (Media Control GfK)	35

== Certifications ==
Certifications and sales
Region	Certification	Certified units/sales
Australia (ARIA)	2× Platinum	140,000^{^}
Austria (IFPI Austria)	Gold	15,000^{*}
Belgium (BRMA)	Platinum	50,000^{*}
France (SNEP)	Gold	400,000
Germany (BVMI)	Platinum	300,000^{^}
New Zealand (RMNZ)	Platinum	10,000^{*}
Norway (IFPI Norway)	Platinum	10,000^{*}
Sweden (GLF)	Gold	10,000^{^}
Switzerland (IFPI Switzerland)	Platinum	40,000^{^}
United Kingdom (BPI)	Platinum	600,000^{‡}
United States (RIAA)	Gold	500,000^{*}
^{*} Sales figures based on certification alone.^{^} Shipments figures based on certification alone.^{‡} Sales+streaming figures based on certification alone.

== Release history ==
Release dates and formats for "Shut Up"
Region	Date	Format(s)	Label(s)	Ref.
United States	September 8, 2003	Contemporary hit radio	A&M; Interscope	
United States	October 14, 2003	Digital download	A&M; Interscope	
United States	November 4, 2003	12-inch vinyl	A&M; Interscope	
Australia	November 24, 2003	Maxi CD	Universal Music	
Germany	November 24, 2003	CD; maxi CD	Universal Music	
United Kingdom	December 1, 2003	12-inch vinyl; maxi CD	Polydor	
France	January 13, 2004	CD; maxi CD	Polydor	

== See also ==
- List of number-one singles in Australia in 2003
- List of number-one hits of 2003 (Germany)
- List of European number-one hits of 2003
- List of number-one singles of 2003 (Ireland)
- List of number-one hits of 2003 (Switzerland)
- Ultratop 50 number-one hits of 2003
- List of number-one hits of 2004 (Austria)
- List of number-one hits of 2004 (France)
- List of number-one hits of 2004 (Italy)
- List of number-one singles from the 2000s (New Zealand)
- List of number-one hits in Norway
- List of Romanian Top 100 number ones of the 2000s
- List of number-one hits (Sweden)
- Ultratop 40 number-one hits of 2004
