= Request + Line =

2001 single by Black Eyed Peas and Macy Gray

Single by Black Eyed Peas featuring Macy Gray

from the album Bridging the Gap
- Released: January 30, 2001
- Genre: Alternative hip-hop; pop rap
- Length: 9:21 (album version); 3:53 (single version)
- Label: Interscope; will.i.am
- Songwriters: William Adams; Allan Pineda; Mike Fratantuno; George Pajon, Jr.; Rhett Lawrence; Natilie Hinds
- Producers: Rhett Lawrence; will.i.am

Black Eyed Peas singles chronology
"Weekends" (2000)	"Request + Line" (2001)	"Where Is the Love?" (2003)

Macy Gray singles chronology
"Geto Heaven Remix T.S.O.I. (The Sound of Illadelph)" (2001)	"Request + Line" (2001)	"When I See You" (2003)

Music video
- "Request + Line" on YouTube

"Request + Line" is a song recorded by American group Black Eyed Peas for their second studio album Bridging the Gap (2000). The song features vocals from Macy Gray. It was released as the third and final single from Bridging the Gap on January 30, 2001, by Interscope Records.

"Request + Line" became the group's first top-40 hit in numerous countries, reaching the top ten in New Zealand, and became their first entry on the US Billboard Hot 100, peaking at number 63.

== Music video ==
The music video was directed by Joseph Kahn. The video begins with flashing objects, a phone picking up, and a flashing sign saying "On Air". The video features Macy Gray behind a turntable. The three members of the Black Eyed Peas are seen on a giant turntable, in a bathroom with a transparent shower bath, toilet and sink, and sitting with Macy Gray on a sofa.

== Track listing ==
United Kingdom

1. "Request + Line" - 3:53
2. "Request + Line" (Trackmasters Remix) - 3:50
3. "Joints & Jam" (The Joint Mix) - 3:37
4. "Request + Line" (Music Video)

America

1. "Request + Line" - 3:53
2. "Request + Line" (Instrumental) - 3:56
3. "Request + Line" (Trackmasters Remix) - 3:51
4. "Request + Line" (Will.I.Am Remix) - 4:22

== Charts ==
Weekly chart performance for "Request + Line"
Chart (2001)	Peak position
Australia (ARIA)	21
Australian Urban (ARIA)	11
Belgium (Ultratip Bubbling Under Flanders)	18
Europe (European Hot 100 Singles)	94
Germany (GfK)	85
Netherlands (Dutch Top 40 Tipparade)	5
Netherlands (Single Top 100)	86
New Zealand (Recorded Music NZ)	10
Scotland Singles (OCC)	45
UK Singles (OCC)	31
UK Hip Hop/R&B (OCC)	8
US Billboard Hot 100	63
US Hot R&B/Hip-Hop Songs (Billboard)	51
US Hot Rap Songs (Billboard)	2
US Pop Airplay (Billboard)	34
US Rhythmic Airplay (Billboard)	35

== Release history ==
Release dates and formats for "Request + Line"
Region	Date	Format(s)	Label(s)	Ref.
United States	January 30, 2001	Rhythmic contemporary radio	Interscope	
Australia	February 19, 2001	Maxi CD	Universal Music	
France	February 26, 2001	Maxi CD	Interscope	
United States	February 27, 2001	Contemporary hit radio	Interscope	
United States	March 13, 2001	12-inch vinyl; cassette; maxi CD	Interscope	
