= Where Is the Love? =

2003 single by the Black Eyed Peas

Single by the Black Eyed Peas

from the album Elephunk
- B-side: "Sumthin for That Ass"; "What's Going Down"
- Released: May 12, 2003
- Recorded: December 26, 2001–March 3, 2003
- Studio: The Stewchia (Los Feliz, California); Glenwood (Burbank, California)
- Genre: Pop rap; conscious hip-hop; R&B
- Length: 4:34 (single version); 3:51 (radio edit)
- Label: A&M; will.i.am; Interscope
- Songwriters: William Adams; Allan Pineda; Jaime Gomez; Justin Timberlake; Printz Board; Michael Fratantuno; George Pajon; J. Curtis
- Producers: will.i.am; Ron Fair

Black Eyed Peas singles chronology
| "Request + Line" (2001) | "Where Is the Love?" (2003) | "Shut Up" (2003) |

Music video
- "Where Is the Love?" on YouTube

"Where Is the Love?" is a song by American hip hop group the Black Eyed Peas. It was released on May 12, 2003, as the lead single from their third album, Elephunk (2003). The song was written by will.i.am, apl.de.ap, Taboo, Justin Timberlake, Printz Board, Michael Fratantuno, and George Pajon. The track features vocals from Timberlake, although he is not officially credited on the single release. It was the group's first single to feature singer Fergie as an official member.

"Where Is the Love?" saw success on radio airplay charts, peaked at number eight on the US Billboard Hot 100, and topped the charts in 15 countries, including the United Kingdom, where it became the biggest-selling single of 2003. The band and Timberlake received two nominations, Record of the Year and Best Rap/Sung Collaboration, for "Where Is the Love?" at the 46th Annual Grammy Awards.

== Background and writing ==
Following the commercial failures of their previous albums and singles, there was doubt over whether the Black Eyed Peas would continue to record together. A&R executive Ron Fair approached them and suggested a crossover to a more mainstream pop sound. will.i.am in particular resisted the idea for fear that they would be seen as sellouts. However, after discussions and some writing sessions, the idea was pursued. After the release of "Where is the Love", Taboo would claim on the topic of selling out that if he was going to sell out, he'd "rather be selling out arenas than selling out of my trunk on the corner of my block."

In an interview with The Telegraph in 2016, will.i.am said the inspiration for the original song came from the generalized anxiety following the September 11 attacks. will.i.am said: "On our last day (of recording sessions in San Francisco), as I was packing my equipment, I saw the first plane fly through the World Trade Center (...) I thought it was a film. The fear of driving back home, y'know going over San Francisco bridge. That 10 minute drive across the bridge felt like an hour." In the same interview, will.i.am claims that the emotions from that time form the base emotions the song's lyrics are composed of.

Shortly after Christmas 2001, three months after 9/11, will.i.am created a loop and a guitar part that he liked. apl.de.ap and Taboo also heard the track and were able to write similar lyrics over it. Justin Timberlake was introduced to the group by Taboo, and got a chance to hear the track that will.i.am created. Impressed with the music, Timberlake helped write and sing the chorus. In a 2025 YouTube short, Taboo revealed that Timberlake called him saying "I think I got it," singing over the phone: "People killing, people dying, children hurt and you hear them crying, would you practice what you preach..." and was instantly impressed by the lyrics.

The production of "Where is the Love" was halted over the early half of 2002 as the band burned out over what will.i.am claimed was 9/11-induced anxiety during their tour in that year. Timberlake was in the midst of promotion of his debut solo album, Justified, and his label Jive Records was concerned about possible overexposure. The Black Eyed Peas were worried about this, as getting some assistance from an established pop star like Timberlake had been the original point of this song. A compromise was reached eventually in which Jive gave clearance for the vocals of Timberlake to be released on the song, but he does not appear in the song's music video nor is he officially credited on the song as an artist. By 2008, the single had sold 954,000 digital copies.

== Composition ==
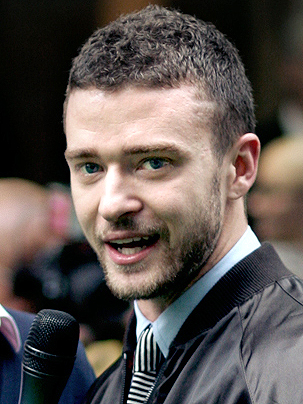
Justin Timberlake co-wrote the song and provided vocals.

Although initially intended as a vessel to post-9/11 anxiety, the song discusses many issues including terrorism, US government hypocrisy, racism, gang crime, pollution, war, and intolerance, with the call for love in the chorus as the element tying these together. The lyric "Overseas, yeah, we try'na stop terrorism - but we still got terrorists here living - in the USA, the big CIA - the Bloods and the Crips and the KKK" compared domestic terrorism with international terrorism - however, in the later live performance of One Love Manchester the inclusion of the CIA was censored. The song was released during the Iraq War and alludes to it and its casus belli with the lyric "A war's going on but the reason's undercover" in the bridge.

The song is in the key of F major (according to musicnotes.com), and has a tempo of 94 BPM. Will.i.am laid the track's iconic main rhythm over the chord progression, which he said was inspired by that of a human heartbeat. "I was like, 'this song needs a heartbeat.' (...) I just liked the pull and the call of response of the human heart – a beat, a rhythm that we hear everyday subconsciously, without paying attention to it."

== Reception ==
As part of the album Elephunk, the song was met with critical and commercial success. Elephunk has a Metacritic score of 66/100. The Black Eyed Peas' album Elephunk sold 3.2 million copies as of 2011. David Jeffries of Drowned in Sound noted that it was the "long time coming" Black Eyed Peas hit, praising its dramatic delivery as "epic, positive, and concerned with where the world is going, "Where Is the Love" bounces between positive hip-hop and orchestral soul that royally recalls Marvin Gaye's social meditations." According to The Washington Post, "Where is the Love" propelled the Black Eyed Peas from the underground to the mainstream. Entertainment Weekly was more negative about the song, which deviates sharply from the Black Eyed Peas' rap roots, writing that "the biggest offense for a once smart-sounding rap collective is 'Where Is the Love,' the horrifyingly trite single with Justin Timberlake. It's enough to make longtime fans wonder, 'Where are the Peas?'" Chris Nettleson of Drowned in Sound refrains from commenting on "Where is the Love" directly, but instead notes that other critics have unfairly regarded Elephunk as deviating from standard hip hop. Nettleson writes that "Where is the Love" is a "slightly saccharine hippy anti-gulf war anthem", but in the context of the entire album of Elephunk it is worth listening to.

The song was the biggest-selling single of 2003 in the UK. It was also the 25th best-selling single of the 2000s decade in the UK.

== Music video ==
The music video for "Where Is the Love?" was shot in East Los Angeles and was directed by member will.i.am. It features the Black Eyed Peas and various other people, including various young children, asking the world where the love really is. In the video, will.i.am and Taboo act as a soul music road duo who use music to tell people what is wrong with the world, Fergie appears as a peacemaker who places stickers with question marks on them all over the place to ask people where the love is in the world, and apl.de.ap is a criminal who is arrested for using criminal offenses to tell people the truth. Justin Timberlake does not appear in the video, as he was promoting his album Justified at the time, though several different people are seen mouthing his part.

The video features posters from the 2002 video game Grand Theft Auto: Vice City, with the question mark symbol plastered over said posters in an apparent protest over the game's violent content. The video later shows gameplay footage from the controversial 2003 first-person shooter Postal 2, in which a group of young children are seen playing the game, suggesting that violence in the media and entertainment industry is a corrupting influence to the youth. Running with Scissors, creators of the Postal franchise, later claimed in a tweet in 2021 that they were paid for the use of the game's footage. As of April 2024 the YouTube video has accumulated more than one billion views.

== Track listings ==
UK CD single

1. "Where Is the Love?"
2. "Sumthin for That Ass"
3. "Where Is the Love?" (instrumental)
4. "Where Is the Love?" (video)

European CD single

1. "Where Is the Love?"
2. "Sumthin for That Ass"

Australian CD single

1. "Where Is the Love?"
2. "Sumthin for That Ass"
3. "What's Going Down"
4. "Where Is the Love?" (video)

== Personnel ==
- Arranged by Ron Fair
- Writers – will.i.am, Justin Timberlake, Taboo, apl.de.ap, Printz Board, Michael Fratantuno, George Pajon, Jr.
- Producers – will.i.am, Ron Fair

== Charts ==
=== Weekly charts ===
| Chart (2003–2004) | Peak position |
|---|---|
| Australia (ARIA) | 1 |
| Australian Urban (ARIA) | 6 |
| Austria (Ö3 Austria Top 40) | 1 |
| Belgium (Ultratop 50 Flanders) | 1 |
| Belgium (Ultratop 50 Wallonia) | 19 |
| Canada CHR (Nielsen BDS) | 1 |
| CIS Airplay (TopHit) | 9 |
| Croatia International (HRT) | 2 |
| Czech Republic (Rádio – Top 100) | 3 |
| Denmark (Tracklisten) | 1 |
| Eurochart Hot 100 (Billboard) | 1 |
| France (SNEP) | 16 |
| Germany (GfK) | 1 |
| Greece (IFPI) | 30 |
| Hungary (Single Top 40) | 3 |
| Hungary (Rádiós Top 40) | 7 |
| Hungary (Dance Top 40) | 10 |
| Ireland (IRMA) | 1 |
| Italy (FIMI) | 3 |
| Netherlands (Dutch Top 40) | 1 |
| Netherlands (Single Top 100) | 1 |
| New Zealand (Recorded Music NZ) | 1 |
| Norway (VG-lista) | 1 |
| Poland (Polish Airplay Chart) | 1 |
| Romania (Romanian Top 100) | 1 |
| Russia Airplay (TopHit) | 84 |
| Scottish Singles Sales (Official Charts) | 1 |
| Spain (Promusicae) | 2 |
| Sweden (Sverigetopplistan) | 1 |
| Switzerland (Schweizer Hitparade) | 1 |
| UK Singles (Official Charts) | 1 |
| UK Hip Hop/R&B (Official Charts) | 1 |
| Ukraine Airplay (TopHit) | 3 |
| US Billboard Hot 100 | 8 |
| US Adult Pop Airplay (Billboard) | 36 |
| US Dance Club Songs (Billboard) | 7 |
| US Dance Airplay (Billboard) | 12 |
| US Hot R&B/Hip-Hop Songs (Billboard) | 22 |
| US Hot Rap Songs (Billboard) | 19 |
| US Pop Airplay (Billboard) | 1 |
| US Rhythmic Airplay (Billboard) | 9 |

| Chart (2012–2013) | Peak position |
|---|---|
| Canada (Nielsen SoundScan) | 51 |
| UK Singles (Official Charts) | 35 |

=== Year-end charts ===
| Chart (2003) | Position |
|---|---|
| Australia (ARIA) | 3 |
| Austria (Ö3 Austria Top 40) | 10 |
| Belgium (Ultratop 50 Flanders) | 10 |
| CIS Airplay (TopHit) | 14 |
| Eurochart Hot 100 (Billboard) | 2 |
| France (SNEP) | 78 |
| Germany (Media Control GfK) | 8 |
| Ireland (IRMA) | 2 |
| Italy (FIMI) | 13 |
| Netherlands (Dutch Top 40) | 4 |
| Netherlands (Single Top 100) | 19 |
| New Zealand (RIANZ) | 2 |
| Romania (Romanian Top 100) | 70 |
| Russia Airplay (TopHit) | 147 |
| Sweden (Hitlistan) | 7 |
| Switzerland (Schweizer Hitparade) | 2 |
| UK Singles (OCC) | 1 |
| UK Urban (Music Week) | 28 |
| Ukraine Airplay (TopHit) | 7 |
| US Billboard Hot 100 | 26 |
| US Mainstream Top 40 (Billboard) | 1 |
| US Rhythmic Top 40 (Billboard) | 23 |

| Chart (2004) | Position |
|---|---|
| Brazil Airplay (Crowley) | 20 |

Year-end chart performance
| Chart (2025) | Position |
|---|---|
| Argentina Anglo Airplay (Monitor Latino) | 95 |

=== Decade-end charts ===
| Chart (2000–2009) | Position |
|---|---|
| Australia (ARIA) | 35 |
| Germany (Media Control GfK) | 89 |
| UK Singles (OCC) | 25 |

=== All-time charts ===
| Chart | Position |
|---|---|
| UK Singles (OCC) | 152 |

== Certifications ==
| Region | Certification | Certified units/sales |
|---|---|---|
| Australia (ARIA) | 4× Platinum | 280,000^{^} |
| Belgium (BRMA) | Gold | 25,000^{*} |
| Brazil (Pro-Música Brasil) | Platinum | 60,000^{‡} |
| Denmark (IFPI Danmark) | 2× Platinum | 180,000^{‡} |
| Germany (BVMI) | 5× Gold | 750,000^{‡} |
| Italy (FIMI) | 2× Platinum | 200,000^{‡} |
| New Zealand (RMNZ) | 6× Platinum | 180,000^{‡} |
| Norway (IFPI Norway) | Platinum | 10,000^{*} |
| Spain (Promusicae) | Platinum | 60,000^{‡} |
| Sweden (GLF) | Platinum | 30,000^{^} |
| United Kingdom (BPI) | 4× Platinum | 2,400,000 |
| United States (RIAA) | 5× Platinum | 5,000,000^{‡} |
^{*} Sales figures based on certification alone.^{^} Shipments figures based on certification alone.^{‡} Sales+streaming figures based on certification alone.

== Release history ==
Release dates and formats
| Region | Date | Format(s) | Label(s) | Ref. |
|---|---|---|---|---|
| United States | May 12, 2003 | Contemporary hit radio; rhythmic contemporary radio | A&M; Interscope | |
| United States | June 3, 2003 | 12-inch vinyl | A&M; Interscope | |
| France | July 16, 2003 | CD | Polydor | |
| Australia | July 28, 2003 | Maxi CD | Universal Music | |
| Germany | September 1, 2003 | Maxi CD | Universal Music | |
| United Kingdom | September 1, 2003 | Maxi CD | Polydor | |

== 2016 version ==
"Where's the Love?"

Single by the Black Eyed Peas featuring the World
- Released: August 31, 2016
- Length: 5:25
- Label: Interscope
- Songwriters: William James Adams, Jr.; Allan Pineda Lindo; Jaime Luis Gomez; Justin Randall Timberlake; Jayceon Terrell Taylor; Rakim Athelaston Mayers; Khaled Mohammed Khaled; Giorgio Hesdey Tuinfort; Priese Prince Lamont Board; Michael Fratantuno; George Pajon, Jr.; Junior Curtis
- Producers: will.i.am; Tuinfort

The Black Eyed Peas singles chronology
| "Don't Stop the Party" (2011) | "Where's the Love?" (2016) | "Ring the Alarm, Pt.1, Pt.2, Pt.3" (2018) |

Music video
- "Where's the Love?" on YouTube

On August 31, 2016, a new version of the song titled "Where's the Love?" (stylized as "#WHERESTHELOVE"), credited to "The Black Eyed Peas featuring The World" was made available for digital download exclusively on iTunes and released to other digital retailers after 24 hours. The song samples the original track but has additional music composition and features additional vocals from Justin Timberlake, Jamie Foxx, Ty Dolla Sign, Mary J. Blige, Diddy, Cassie, Andra Day, The Game, Tori Kelly, V. Bozeman, Jessie J, French Montana, DJ Khaled, Usher, Nicole Scherzinger, ASAP Rocky, Jaden Smith, and a 40-member children's choir. All proceeds from the song were going to will.i.am's non-profit foundation, i.am.angel. – the charity funds educational programs and college scholarships. The Black Eyed Peas partnered with issues-driven media company ATTN and foundation education partner and leading geospatial company Esri for the single release campaign. It was the group's last song to feature singer Fergie.

=== Music video ===
An accompanying music video, directed by Michael Jurkovac, also premiered worldwide on Apple Music that same day and shows appearances by the featured vocalists and many celebrities including Connie Britton, Lance Bass, Rosario Dawson, Shailene Woodley, Taye Diggs, Kareem Abdul-Jabbar, Quincy Jones, Olivia Munn, Jhené Aiko, Krewella, Wiz Khalifa, Charlie Carver, Ian Harding, Max Carver, Daniel Sharman, Vanessa Hudgens, Russell Westbrook, Carla Gugino, DJ Khaled, Ben Barnes, Nikki Reed, Omarion, Jessica Szohr, Snoop Dogg, LL Cool J, Ryan Guzman, Adrianne Palicki, Becky G, Adrienne Bailon, Kris Jenner, and Kendall Jenner.

Inspired by tragedies, like the attacks in Paris, and in Brussels and Orlando, and police shootings of Philando Castile and Alton Sterling, the Peas saw the relevance of the song and decided it was time to revive the track for a new generation. Family members affected by gun violence including (Alton Sterling's aunt Sandra, Philando Castile's mother Valerie) and police officials (Dallas Police Chief David O. Brown, Officer Miguel Salcedo) and more appear in the video.

=== Personnel ===
Personnel are adapted from the official press release.

- Produced, instruments and programming by Giorgio Tuinfort and will.i.am
- Mixed by will.i.am and Joe Peluso
- Mastered by Joe Bozzi
- Written by will.i.am, apl.de.ap, Taboo, Justin Timberlake, the Game, ASAP Rocky, DJ Khaled, and Giorgio Tuinfort
- Piano by Giorgio Tuinfort
- First violin by Ben Mathot, Inger van Vliet, Marleen Wester, Tseroeja van den Bos, and Sofie van der Pol
- Second violin by Judith van Driel, Loes Dooren, Diewertje Wanders, and Azra Dizdar
- Alt violin by Ian de Jong, Yanna Pelser, Bas Goossens
- Cello by David Faber and Jascha Bordon
- Bass by Hinse Mutter
- Horns by Jenneke de Jonge
- Trumpet by Printz Board
- Orchestra Midi programming by Franck van der Heijden
- Orchestra arrangement by Franck van der Heijden and Giorgio Tuinfort
- Orchestra recorded and mixed by Paul Power
- Vocals recorded by will.i.am and Padraic Kerin
- Main and additional vocals by Black Eyed Peas, Justin Timberlake, Jamie Foxx, Ty Dolla $ign, Mary J. Blige, Diddy, Cassie, Andra Day, the Game, Tori Kelly, V. Bozeman, Jessie J, French Montana, DJ Khaled, Usher, Nicole Scherzinger, ASAP Rocky, Jaden Smith, and the 40-member child choir the World.

=== Charts ===
| Chart (2016) | Peak position |
|---|---|
| Australia (ARIA) | 15 |
| Australia Digital Track Chart (ARIA) | 5 |
| Belgium (Ultratip Bubbling Under Flanders) | 12 |
| Belgium Urban (Ultratop Flanders) | 15 |
| Belgium (Ultratip Bubbling Under Wallonia) | 6 |
| Canadian Digital Songs (Billboard) | 21 |
| Euro Digital Songs (Billboard) | 14 |
| Finland Download (Latauslista) | 12 |
| France (SNEP) | 26 |
| Germany (Official German Charts) | 39 |
| Italy (Musica e dischi) | 44 |
| Luxembourg Digital Songs (Billboard) | 5 |
| Netherlands (Dutch Top 40 Tip) | 28 |
| New Zealand Heatseekers (Recorded Music NZ) | 3 |
| Scottish Singles Sales (Official Charts) | 11 |
| Slovakia Singles Digital (ČNS IFPI) | 58 |
| Switzerland (Schweizer Hitparade) | 41 |
| UK Singles (Official Charts) | 47 |
| US Digital Songs (Billboard) | 39 |
| US Pop Digital Songs (Billboard) | 20 |

=== 2016 Spanish/English version ===
The Black Eyed Peas also released a bilingual Spanish/English version of "Where's the Love?", titled "Dónde Está El Amor?" crediting the Black Eyed Peas featuring El Mundo. The version was premiered on November 7, 2016, during Premios de la Radio. The music video premiered days later, featuring a roster of Latin stars including Gerardo Ortíz, Milkman, Pepe Aguilar, Becky G, Fey, Paulina Rubio, Luis Coronel, and many others.

== See also ==
- List of Romanian Top 100 number ones of the 2000s
- List of anti-war songs
