= Kim Hill (soul singer) =

American soul musician (born 1970)

- Born: Kimberly Allise Hill; August 7, 1970 (age 56)
- Origin: Syracuse, New York, U.S.
- Genres: Soul; R&B; gospel; funk; hip hop
- Occupations: Singer; songwriter
- Formerly of: Black Eyed Peas

Kimberly Allise Hill (born August 7, 1970) is an American soul musician, best known for her work with the hip hop group the Black Eyed Peas.

== Early life ==
Hill grew up in Camillus, New York, a small suburb outside Syracuse, New York. She was raised by her single mother in a primarily white neighborhood.

She also has a brother and a sister.

== Career ==
When Hill moved to Los Angeles, she found work as an extra on television for shows such as Living Single.

She joined Black Eyed Peas after meeting them backstage at a BMI showcase in 1995. She also signed to will.i.am's label I Am Music (an imprint of Interscope Records). Hill got to realize her childhood dream of performing on Soul Train when Black Eyed Peas were asked to perform in 1998. Hill signed a solo deal with Interscope Records in 1998, but she later ended up releasing the record on her own. As the merger of Interscope's parent company Universal Music Group and PolyGram took full effect, Hill resisted pressure by Interscope to over-sexualize her image. She left the band in 2000, and was later replaced by Fergie in 2002.

Hill has since begun performing as a solo artist, and she occasionally acts in indie projects. She began DJing in 2008.

Hill crowdfunded her cosmetic line, Next of Kim, in November 2018.

Hill featured on The Pharcyde song Mr. Valentine and released the single Right Now in 2021.

== Personal life ==
Hill is divorced and has one son.

== Discography ==
=== Albums ===
Title	Album details
Suga Hill	Released: 2005; Label: Self-released; Formats: CD, Digital download; Track listing: 1. Feel Me; 2. Taxicab; 3. Mars; 4. Lost My Mind; 5. Sunny Blue; 6. Basically; 7. Summertime in Aspen (Remix by DJ Spinna); 8. K.I.M.M.Y.; 9. The Real Hip Hop

=== Guest appearances ===
Songs	Album	Year
"The Way U Make Me Feel"	Behind the Front	1998
"Be Free"	Behind the Front	1998
"What It Is"	Behind the Front	1998
Songs	Album	Year
"Hot'"	Bridging the Gap	2000
"Lil' Lil'"	Bridging the Gap	2000
"Bridging the Gaps"	Bridging the Gap	2000
"Rap Song"	Bridging the Gap	2000
"Tell Your Momma Come"	Bridging the Gap	2000
"Empire Strikes Back"	Bridging the Gap (Bonus)	2000
"Magic"	Bridging the Gap (Bonus)	2000
Songs	Album	Year
"Complete Beloved"	Love & Basketball Soundtrack	2000
"I Want Cha"	Scary Movie Soundtrack	2001
"Leave It All Behind"	Joints & Jam - Single	1998
"Let Me Tell You Something"	Bridging the Gap Promo	2000
"Beautiful People"	N/A	2000
