= List of awards and nominations received by Black Eyed Peas =

Black Eyed Peas awards and nominations
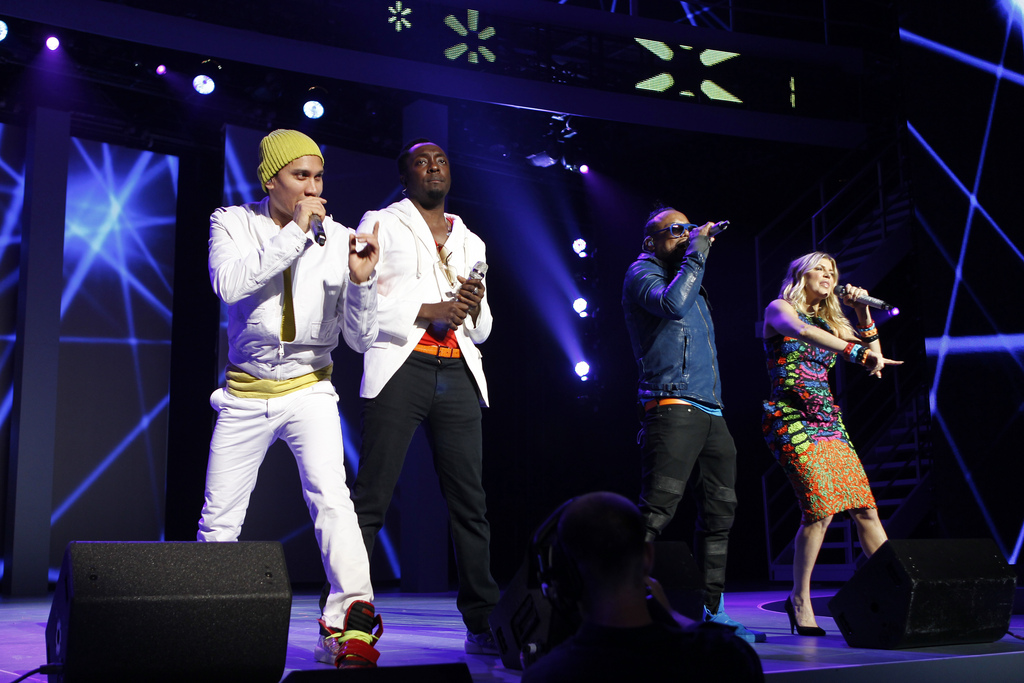
- The Black Eyed Peas at Walmart meeting, 2011
Awards and nominations
Award	Wins	Nominations
American Music Awards	3	9
Billboard	2	8
Grammy	6	12
NRJ	5	4
Teen Choice	4	5
World Music	3	3

Totals (Note: Certain award groups do not simply award one winner. They acknowledge several different recipients, have runners-up, and have third place. Since this is a specific recognition and is different from losing an award, runner-up mentions are considered wins in this award tally. For simplification and to avoid errors, each award in this list has been presumed to have had a prior nomination.)
- Wins: 61
- Nominations: 102

This is a list of awards and nominations received by The Black Eyed Peas, an American hip hop group from Los Angeles, California.

== ALMA Awards ==
Year	Nominee / work	Award	Result
2009	Black Eyed Peas	Best of the Year in Music	Nominated

== American Music Awards ==
The American Music Awards is an annual American music awards show celebrating worlwile artist, based on commercial performance, such as sales and airplay, in the United States.

Year	Nominee / work	Award	Result
2003	Black Eyed Peas	Favorite Rap/Hip-Hop Band/Duo/Group	Nominated
2005	Black Eyed Peas	Favorite Pop/Rock Band/Duo/Group	Won
2005	Black Eyed Peas	Favorite Rap/Hip-Hop Band/Duo/Group	Won
2006	Black Eyed Peas	Favorite Rap/Hip-Hop Band/Duo/Group	Won
2006	Black Eyed Peas	Favourite Soul/R&B Band/Duo/Group	Won
2006	Monkey Business	Favorite Rap/Hip-Hop Album	Won
2009	The E.N.D	Favorite Soul/R&B Album	Nominated
2009	"Black Eyed Peas"	Favorite Soul/R&B Band/Duo/Group	Won
2009	"Black Eyed Peas"	Favorite Pop/Rock Band/Duo/Group	Won
2010	"Black Eyed Peas"	Favorite Pop/Rock Band/Duo/Group	Won
2026	"Rock That Body"	Best Throwback Song	Won

== ASCAP Pop Music Awards ==
Year	Nominee / work	Award	Result
2012	"Just Can't Get Enough"	Most Performed Song	Won
2021	"Ritmo (Bad Boys For Life)" (with J Balvin)	Most Performed Song	Won

== ASCAP Latin Music Awards ==
Year	Nominee / work	Award	Result
2021	"Mamacita" (with Ozuna)	Most Performed Song	Won
2021	"Ritmo (Bad Boys For Life)" (with J Balvin)	Most Performed Song	Won

== ARIA Music Awards ==
The ARIA Music Awards is an annual series of awards celebrating the Australian music industry, put on by the Australian Recording Industry Association (ARIA).

Year	Nominee / work	Award	Result
2010	Black Eyed Peas	Most Popular International Artist	Nominated

== BET Awards ==
The BET Awards is an American award show that was established in 2001 by the Black Entertainment Television network to celebrate African Americans and other American minorities in music, acting, sports, and other fields of entertainment over the past year. The group received one award from two nominations.

Year	Nominee / work	Award	Result
2006	Black Eyed Peas	Best Group	Won
2010	Black Eyed Peas	Best Group	Nominated

== Billboard Music Awards ==
The Billboard Music Awards are honors given out annually by Billboard, a publication and music popularity chart covering the music business.

Year	Nominee / work	Award	Result
2003	"Where is the Love?"	Mainstream Top 40 Track of the Year	Won
2004	"Let's Get It Started"	Top Digital Track	Nominated
2004	Black Eyed Peas	Top Digital Artist	Nominated
2005	Black Eyed Peas	Top Duo or Group	Nominated
2011	Black Eyed Peas	Top Band/Duo/Group	Won
2011	Black Eyed Peas	Top Dance Artist	Nominated
2011	Black Eyed Peas	Top Pop Artist	Nominated
2011	The E.N.D	Top Pop Album	Nominated
2012	Black Eyed Peas	Top Duo/Group	Nominated
2020	"Ritmo (Bad Boys For Life)"	Top Dance/Electronic Song	Nominated

== Billboard Latin Music Awards ==
Year	Nominee / work	Award	Result
2009	Black Eyed Peas	Crossover Artist of the Year	Won
2021	Black Eyed Peas	Crossover Artist of the Year	Won
2021	Black Eyed Peas	Duo/Group Top Latin Albums Artist of the Year	Nominated
2021	"Ritmo (Bad Boys For Life)" (with J Balvin)	Vocal Event Hot Latin Song of the Year	Nominated
2021	"Ritmo (Bad Boys For Life)" (with J Balvin)	Hot Latin Song of the Year	Nominated
2021	"Ritmo (Bad Boys For Life)" (with J Balvin)	Latin Rhythm Song of the Year	Nominated
2021	"Ritmo (Bad Boys For Life)" (with J Balvin)	Sales Song of the Year	Won
2021	"Mamacita" (with Ozuna)	Sales Song of the Year	Nominated
2021	"Mamacita" (with Ozuna)	Latin Pop Song of the Year	Won

== Billboard R&B/Hip-Hop Awards ==
Year	Nominee / work	Award	Result
2004	Latin Girls	Top R&B/Hip-Hop Song	Nominated
2004	Elephunk	Top Rap Album	Nominated

== BMI Pop Awards ==
Year	Nominee / work	Award	Result
2012	"Just Can't Get Enough"	Award-winning Songs	Won

== BRIT Awards ==
Year	Nominee / work	Award	Result
2004	Black Eyed Peas	Best Pop Act	Nominated
2004	Black Eyed Peas	International Group	Nominated
2006	Black Eyed Peas	International Group	Nominated
2010	The E.N.D	International Album	Nominated
2011	Black Eyed Peas	International Group	Nominated

== Channel [V] Thailand Music Video Awards ==
Year	Nominee / work	Award	Result
2006	Black Eyed Peas	Popular International Group	Won
2011	Black Eyed Peas	Popular International Group	Won

== ECHO Awards, Germany ==
Year	Nominee / work	Award	Result
2006	Black Eyed Peas	Best International Pop/Rock Group	Nominated
2010	Black Eyed Peas	Best International Pop/Rock Group	Nominated

== Grammy Awards ==
The Grammy Award is an award presented by the Recording Academy to recognize achievements in the music industry. The Black Eyed Peas received 6 awards from 15 nominations.

Year	Nominee / work	Award	Result
2004	"Where Is the Love?" (ft. Justin Timberlake)	Best Rap/Sung Collaboration	Nominated
2004	"Where Is the Love?" (ft. Justin Timberlake)	Record of the Year	Nominated
2005	"Let's Get It Started"	Record of the Year	Nominated
2005	"Let's Get It Started"	Best Rap Performance by a Duo or Group	Won
2005	"Let's Get It Started"	Best Rap Song	Nominated
2005	"Hey Mama"	Best Rap Song	Nominated
2006	"Don't Phunk with My Heart"	Best Rap Performance by a Duo or Group	Won
2006	"Don't Phunk with My Heart"	Best Rap Song	Nominated
2006	"Gone Going" (with Jack Johnson)	Best Pop Collaboration with Vocals	Nominated
2006	"Don't Lie"	Best Pop Performance by a Duo or Group with Vocals	Nominated
2007	"My Humps"	Best Pop Performance by a Duo or Group with Vocals	Won
2007	"Mas Que Nada"	Best Urban/Alternative Performance	Nominated
2010	The E.N.D.	Album of the Year	Nominated
2010	The E.N.D.	Best Pop Vocal Album	Won
2010	"I Gotta Feeling"	Record of the Year	Nominated
2010	"I Gotta Feeling"	Best Pop Performance by a Duo or Group with Vocals	Won
2010	"Boom Boom Pow"	Best Dance Recording	Nominated
2010	"Boom Boom Pow"	Best Short Form Music Video	Won

== IFPI Hong Kong Top Sales Music Awards ==
Year	Nominee / work	Award	Result
2005	Monkey Business	Top 10 Best Selling Foreign Albums	Won

== Juno Awards ==
Year	Nominee / work	Award	Result
2006	"Monkey Business"	International Album Of The Year	Won
2010	The E.N.D	International Album Of The Year	Nominated

== Latin American Music Awards ==
Year	Nominee / work	Award	Result
2021	Black Eyed Peas	Favorite Crossover Artist	Nominated
2021	"Ritmo (Bad Boys for Life)"	Song of The Year	Nominated
2021	"Ritmo (Bad Boys for Life)"	Favorite Urban Song	Nominated
2021	"Ritmo (Bad Boys for Life)"	Collaboration of the Year	Nominated
2021	"Mamacita"	Favorite Pop Song	Nominated

== Los 40 Music Awards ==
Year	Nominee / Work	Award	Result
2022	Black Eyed Peas	Best International Act	Nominated
2022	Black Eyed Peas	Best Live Act	Nominated
2022	"Don't You Worry" (featuring Shakira and David Guetta)	Best Song	Nominated
2022	"Don't You Worry" (featuring Shakira and David Guetta)	Best Collaboration	Nominated

== Mnet Asian Music Awards ==
Year	Nominee / work	Award	Result
2005	Black Eyed Peas - "Don't Lie"	Best International Artist	Won

== Mobo Awards ==
Year	Nominee / work	Award	Result
2006	Black Eyed Peas	Best Group	Won
2010	Black Eyed Peas	Best International Act	Nominated

== MTV Asia Awards ==
Year	Nominee / work	Award	Result
2006	Black Eyed Peas	Favorite Pop Act	Nominated

== MTV Australia Music Video Awards ==
Year	Nominee / work	Award	Result
2005	"Hey Mama"	Best R&B Video	Won
2005	"Hey Mama"	Sexiest Video	Won
2006	"Don't Phunk with my Heart"	Best Hip-Hop Video	Nominated

== MTV Europe Music Award ==
Year	Nominee / work	Award	Result
2004	Elephunk	Best Album	Nominated
2004	Black Eyed Peas	Best Group	Nominated
2004	Black Eyed Peas	Best Pop Act	Won
2005	Black Eyed Peas	Best Pop Act	Won
2005	Black Eyed Peas	Best Group	Nominated
2006	Black Eyed Peas	Best Group	Nominated
2009	Black Eyed Peas	Best Group	Nominated
2009	"I Gotta Feeling"	Best Song	Nominated

== MTV Philippines Music Award ==
Year	Nominee / work	Award	Result
2004	The Black Eyed Peas	Favorite International Video	Won

== MTV Russia Music Award ==
Year	Nominee / work	Award	Result
2005	The Black Eyed Peas	Best International Act	Won
2006	The Black Eyed Peas	Best International Act	Won

== MTV Video Music Awards ==
Year	Nominee / work	Award	Result
1999	"Joints and Jam"	Best Special Effects in a Video	Nominated
2001	"Request + Line" (ft. Macy Gray)	Best Hip-Hop Video	Nominated
2004	"Hey Mama"	Best Hip-Hop Video	Nominated
2004	"Hey Mama"	Best Dance Video	Nominated
2004	"Hey Mama"	Best Choreography in a Video	Won
2005	"Dont Phunk with my Heart"	Best Group Video	Nominated
2006	"My Humps"	Best Hip-Hop Video	Won
2006	"My Humps"	Ringtone of the Year	Nominated
2020	"Ritmo (Bad Boys for Life)"	Best Collaboration	Nominated
2020	"Mamacita"	Best Latin	Nominated
2021	"Girl Like Me"	Best Latin	Nominated

== MTV Music Video Awards Japan ==
Year	Nominee / work	Award	Result
2004	"Where is the Love?"	Best Group Video	Nominated
2005	"Let's Get It Started"	Best Hip-Hop Video	Nominated
2006	"Don't Phunk with my Heart"	Best Group Video	Nominated
2006	"Don't Phunk with my Heart"	Best Pop Video	Nominated
2006	The E.N.D	Album of the Year	Nominated
2010	"I Gotta Feeling"	Best Karaokee! Song	Nominated
2010	"My Humps"	Best Group Video	Nominated
2011	"The Time (Dirty Bit)"	Best Group Video	Nominated

== MuchMusic Video Awards ==
Year	Nominee / work	Award	Result
2005	"Let's Get It Started"	Favorite International Group	Nominated
2005	"Let's Get It Started"	Best International Video - Group	Nominated
"2006	"My Humps"	Best International Group	Nominated
"2006	"My Humps"	People's Choice: Favorite International Artist	Nominated
2009	"Boom Boom Pow"	International Video of the Year - Group	Won
2010	"I Gotta Feeling"	International Video of the Year - Group	Nominated

== MYX Music Awards ==
Year	Nominee / work	Award	Result
2006	"My Humps"	Favorite International Music Video	Nominated

== NAACP Awards ==
Year	Nominee / work	Award	Result
2006	Black Eyed Peas	Outstanding Duo or Group	Nominated
2010	Black Eyed Peas	Outstanding Group/Duo or Collaboration	Won
2010	"Boom Boom Pow"	Outstanding Music Video	Nominated
2011	Black Eyed Peas	Outstanding Group/Duo or Collaboration	Nominated

== Nickelodeon Kids' Choice Awards ==
Year	Nominee / work	Award	Result
2004	"Where is the Love" (featuring Justin Timberlake)	Favorite Song	Nominated
2005	The Black Eyed Peas	Favorite Music Group	Nominated
2006	The Black Eyed Peas	Favorite Music Group	Nominated
2007	The Black Eyed Peas	Favorite Music Group	Won
2010	The Black Eyed Peas	Favorite Music Group	Won
2010	"I Gotta Feeling"	Favorite Song	Nominated
2011	The Black Eyed Peas	Favorite Music Group	Won
2012	The Black Eyed Peas	Favorite Music Group	Nominated
2021	The Black Eyed Peas	Favorite Music Group	Nominated
2022	The Black Eyed Peas	Favorite Music Group	Nominated
2023	The Black Eyed Peas	Favorite Music Group	Nominated

== NRJ Music Awards ==
Year	Nominee / work	Award	Result
2005	Black Eyed Peas	International Group Of The Year	Nominated
2005	"Elephunk"	International Album Of The Year	Won
2005	"Shut Up"	International Song Of The Year	Nominated
2006	"Monkey Business"	International Album Of The Year	Won
2006	"Don't Lie"	International Song Of The Year	Nominated
2006	Black Eyed Peas	International Group Of The Year	Won
2007	Black Eyed Peas	International Group Of The Year	Nominated
2010	Black Eyed Peas	International Group Of The Year	Nominated
2010	The E.N.D	International Album Of The Year	Nominated
2010	"I Gotta Feeling"	International Song Of The Year	Won
2011	Black Eyed Peas	International Group Of The Year	Won
2011	Black Eyed Peas	Concert Of The Year	Won
2012	Black Eyed Peas	International Group Of The Year	Nominated
2020	Black Eyed Peas	International Group Of The Year	Nominated
2020	"Ritmo" (feat. J. Balvin)	International Song Of The Year	Nominated
2020	"Ritmo" (feat. J. Balvin)	International Collaboration Of The Year	Nominated
2021	"Girl Like Me" (feat. Shakira)	International Collaboration Of The Year	Nominated
2022	Black Eyed Peas	International Group Of The Year	Nominated
2022	"Don't You Worry" (feat. Shakira & David Guetta)	International Song Of The Year	Nominated
2022	"Don't You Worry" (feat. Shakira & David Guetta)	International Clip Of The Year	Nominated
2022	"Don't You Worry" (feat. Shakira & David Guetta)	International Collaboration Of The Year	Nominated
2023	Black Eyed Peas	International Group Of The Year	Nominated

== NRJ Radio Awards ==
Year	Nominee / work	Award	Result
2004	"Where is the Love?"	Best International Song	Won

== People's Choice Award, USA ==
Year	Nominee / work	Award	Result
2006	Black Eyed Peas	Favorite Group	Nominated
2007	Black Eyed Peas	Favorite Group	Nominated
2010	Black Eyed Peas	Favorite Pop Act	Nominated

== Premios Juventud ==
The Premios Juventud is an awards show for Spanish-speaking celebrities in the areas of film, music, sports, fashion, and pop culture, presented by the television network Univision. Winners are determined by Univision public.

Year	Nominee / work	Award	Result
2020	"Ritmo (Bad Boys For Life)"	Can't Get Enough Of This Song	Nominated

== Premios 40 Principales ==
The Premios 40 Principales is an annual Spanish awards show that recognises the people and works of pop musicians.

Year	Nominee / work	Award	Result
2009	The Black Eyed Peas	Best International Artist	Won
2009	I Gotta Feeling	Best International Song	Won

== Premios Lo Nuestro ==
Premio Lo Nuestro is a Spanish-language awards show honoring the best of Latin music, presented by Univision, a Spanish-language television network based in the United States. The awards began in 1989.

Year	Nominee / work	Award	Result
2021	"Ritmo (Bad Boys for Life)" (ft. J Balvin)	Urban Song of the Year	Nominated
2021	"Ritmo (Bad Boys for Life)" (ft. J Balvin)	Urban Collaboration of the Year	Nominated
2021	"Ritmo (Bad Boys for Life)" (ft. J Balvin)	Crossover Collaboration of the Year	Nominated
2021	"Mamacita" (ft. Ozuna & J. Rey Soul)	Crossover Collaboration of the Year	Nominated
2024	"Bailar Contigo" (ft. Daddy Yankee)	Crossover Collaboration of the Year	Won

== Premios Nuestra Tierra ==
These awards are a recognition that is made to Colombian artists and some international artists. They have a format similar to that of the Grammy Awards, but restricted to the Colombian scope. The group received one award from two nominations.

Year	Nominee / work	Award	Result
2020	"Ritmo (Bad Boys for Life)" (ft. J Balvin)	Public Choice Song	Nominated
2020	"Ritmo (Bad Boys for Life)" (ft. J Balvin)	Best Dance/EDM Song	Won
2021	"Girl Like Me (ft. Shakira)	Best Dance/EDM Song	Won
2021	"Girl Like Me (ft. Shakira)	Best Video	Nominated
2021	"Girl Like Me (ft. Shakira)	Public Choice Song	Nominated

== Radio Music Awards ==
Year	Nominee / work	Award	Result
2005	Black Eyed Peas	Artist of the Year/Mainstream Hit Radio	Nominated

== Rock (The Vote) Awards ==
Year	Nominee / work	Award	Result
2005	Black Eyed Peas	Patrick Lippert Award	Won

== Soul Train Music Awards ==
Year	Nominee / work	Award	Result
2006	Monkey Business	Best Soul/R&B Album By Band/Duo/Group	Won
2006	"My Humps"	Best Soul/R&B or Rap Dance Cut	Nominated

== Teen Choice Awards ==
Year	Nominee / work	Award	Result
2004	"Where is the Love?"	Rap/Hip-Hop Track	Won
2005	"Monkey Business"	Rap Album	Won
2006	Black Eyed Peas	Rap Artist	Won
2009	"Boom Boom Pow"	Rap/Hip-Hop track	Won
2009	The E.N.D	Group Album	Nominated
2010	Black Eyed Peas	Best Group	Nominated
2011	Black Eyed Peas	Choice Music:Group	Nominated
2011	"Just Cant Get Enough"	Hip-Hop Track	Nominated
2011	"The Time (Dirty Bit)"	Single	Nominated

== TMF Awards (Netherland) ==
Year	Nominee / work	Award	Result
2006	Black Eyed Peas	Best Act International	Won

== Vibe Awards ==
Year	Nominee / work	Award	Result
2005	Black Eyed Peas	Best Group	Nominated

== World Music Awards ==
Year	Nominee / work	Award	Result
2005	Black Eyed Peas	Best Selling Pop Group	Nominated
2010	Black Eyed Peas	Best Selling Pop Act	Won
2010	Black Eyed Peas	Best Selling R&B Act	Won
2010	Black Eyed Peas	Best Selling Hip/Hop Act	Won
2010	The E.N.D	Best Selling Album	Nominated
2010	"I Gotta Feeling"	Best Selling Single	Nominated
