= Monkey Business (Black Eyed Peas album) =

- Standard cover (Note: Asian special edition cover is the same as the single cover for "Don't Phunk with My Heart".)

Studio album by the Black Eyed Peas
- Released: May 25, 2005
- Recorded: June–December 2004
- Studios: Amerycan (Los Angeles); The Brothel (Philadelphia); Bullet Train (Japan); Daddy's House (New York); Glenwood (Burbank); Henson (Los Angeles); Hit Factory Criteria (Miami); Metropolis (London); Morning View (Malibu); Osi and Calvin (Washington, D.C.); Record Plant (Los Angeles); Smart (Madison); Sony (New York); The Stewchia (Los Angeles); Unnamed location (Berlin); The Peas Tour Bus; will.i.am Protools Rig
- Genres: Hip-hop; pop
- Length: 66:03
- Languages: English; Tagalog
- Labels: A&M; Interscope; will.i.am
- Producers: will.i.am; Timbaland; apl.de.ap; Printz Board; Noize Trip

The Black Eyed Peas chronology
Elephunk (2003)	Monkey Business (2005)	Renegotiations: The Remixes (2006)

Singles from Monkey Business
- 1. "Don't Phunk with My Heart" Released: April 5, 2005; 2. "Don't Lie" Released: June 29, 2005; 3. "My Humps" Released: September 20, 2005; 4. "Pump It" Released: January 17, 2006

Monkey Business is the fourth studio album by American group the Black Eyed Peas. It was released on May 25, 2005, by A&M Records, Interscope Records and will.i.am Music Group.

Following the global success of their third studio album, Elephunk (2003), the group embarked on the Elephunk Tour. While touring, they began recording Monkey Business in June 2004, continuing for the following six months at various locations worldwide. Executive producers Ron Fair and will.i.am enlisted producers Printz Board, Noize Trip, Timbaland and Danja for the album. Their final product was a hip-hop and pop record incorporating an array of genres, such as crunk, funk, reggae, Raï, calypso, soul, jazz and Latin rock. Similarly to Elephunk, it explores lyrical themes such as relationship complexities, sexual attraction, partying, fame and, to a lesser extent, social issues. Controversy arose over the lyrics of the track "My Humps", which center on a woman using her physical attributes to accomplish her goals.

Monkey Business received mixed reviews from music critics, who complimented its production but criticized its lyrical content and Black Eyed Peas' inclination to commercialization with the album. It debuted at number two on the US Billboard 200 with first-week sales of 291,000 units, becoming the group's first top-ten album on the chart. The album was certified triple platinum by the Recording Industry Association of America (RIAA), selling over four million copies in the United States. Internationally, it reached number one in Australia, Canada, France, Germany, Mexico, New Zealand, and Switzerland, and has sold over nine million copies worldwide. Despite its critical response, the album won two Grammy Awards for its singles "Don't Phunk with My Heart" and "My Humps", receiving three additional nominations.

Monkey Business produced four singles. "Don't Phunk with My Heart" became the group's highest-peaking single on the US Billboard Hot 100 at the time, peaking at number three, and reached number one in Australia, Canada, the Czech Republic, Finland, and New Zealand. "Don't Lie" peaked at number 14 on the Billboard Hot 100, being overshadowed by its successor "My Humps", which began receiving heavy unsolicited airplay. After its official release as a single, "My Humps" peaked at number three on the Billboard Hot 100, reaching number one in Australia, Canada, Ireland and New Zealand. The final single "Pump It" became the album's lowest-peaking single on the Billboard Hot 100, reaching number 18. The album was further promoted with two global concert tours–The Monkey Business Tour (2005–2006) and the Black Blue & You Tour (2007).

== Background and development ==
In June 2003, Black Eyed Peas released their third studio album Elephunk. During its production, Fergie joined the group as its female vocalist. Led by a global hit single and the group's first top-ten hit on the US Billboard Hot 100 "Where Is the Love?", the album was a sleeper hit and became their breakthrough record. It peaked at number 14 on the US Billboard 200, was certified double platinum by the Recording Industry Association of America (RIAA), and garnered six Grammy Award nominations, including the group's first win for "Let's Get It Started". The commercial success of Elephunk made a substantial impact on the group's prominence, and its members will.i.am and Fergie planned on recording solo studio albums in 2004. However, the plans were postponed as they "felt it was important to install the next Black Eyed Peas record this year with the momentum that we've had, which will only allow our solo adventures to be successful and continue to keep our franchise going". Fergie stated: "For us, Black Eyed Peas are feeling really good right now, and for me to come out with a solo record, it just doesn't feel right. This is a family, and we're on a certain kind of wave and I wanna keep riding on that wave together. It's my boys." She would later release her debut solo studio album The Dutchess in September 2006, and will.i.am released his third studio album Songs About Girls in September 2007.

== Recording and production ==
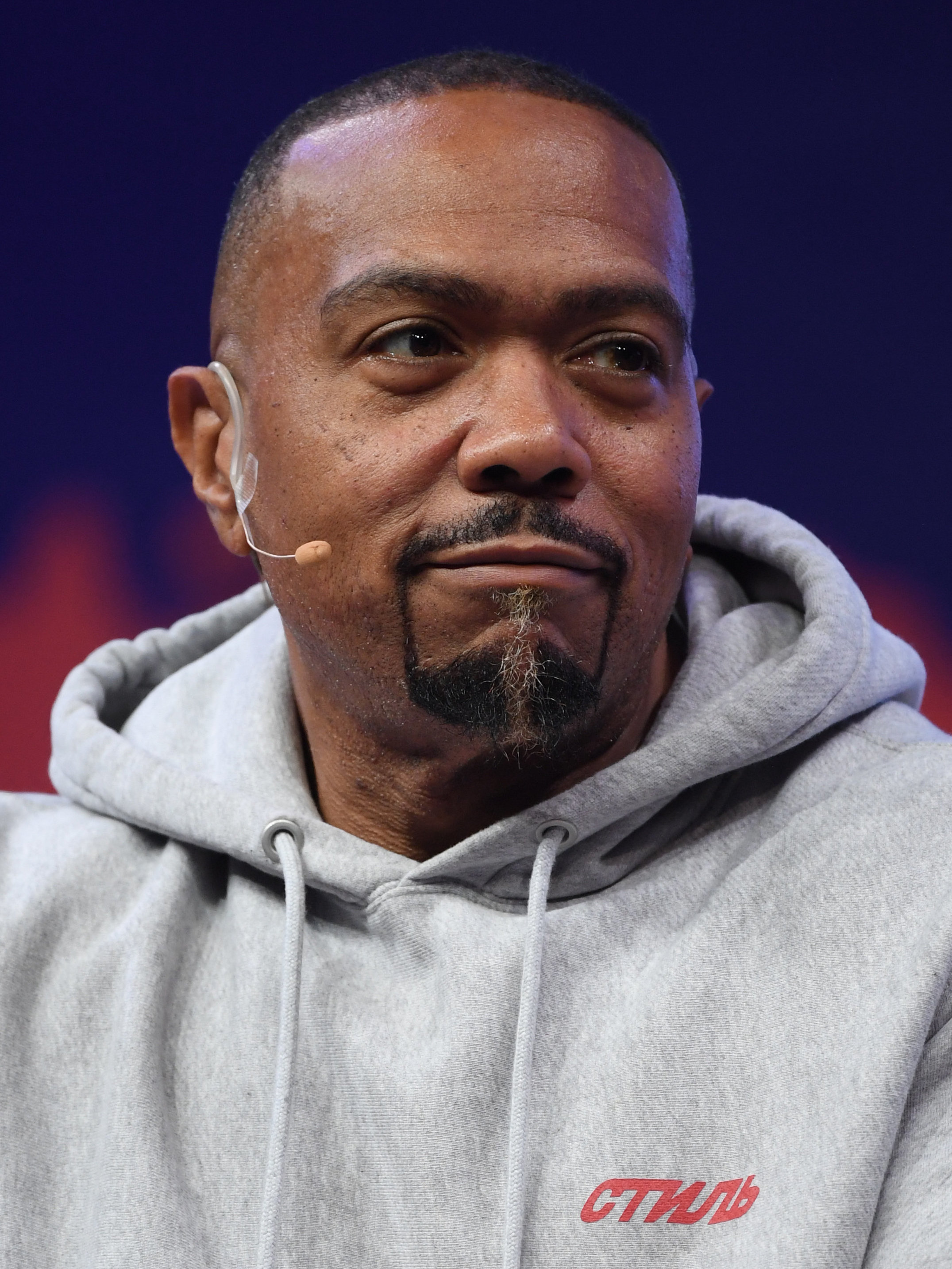
Timbaland co-wrote and produced "My Style".

Monkey Business was recorded in "two and three-month spurts" throughout 2004 while Black Eyed Peas were on their Elephunk Tour, in support of their third studio album Elephunk (2003). The executive producer will.i.am co-wrote all the tracks, and produced or co-produced all tracks except "My Style" and "Disco Club". Among other producers were apl.de.ap, Timbaland, Danja, Printz Board, Noize Trip, and the executive producer Ron Fair. apl.de.ap co-wrote nine tracks, Fergie co-wrote eight, and Taboo co-wrote two. The production commenced in June, while the group was touring the United Kingdom. They recorded six tracks at the Metropolis Studios in London. The recording sessions continued in July during the tour's stop in Japan, where "Pump It" was partly recorded in a bullet train. Upon the group's return to the United States, they recorded most of the tracks at the Stewchia in Los Feliz, Los Angeles.

On August 11, a fire caused by unattended candles broke out at the Glenwood Studios in Burbank, California while the group was recording, destroying approximately $50,000 worth of gear and instruments. Other recording locations for Monkey Business included Amerycan Studios, Henson Recording Studios and the Record Plant in Los Angeles; Morning View Studios in Malibu, California; Smart Studios in Madison, Wisconsin; Daddy's House and Sony Music Studios in New York City; The Brothel in Philadelphia; Osi and Calvin Studios in Washington, D.C.; the Hit Factory Criteria in Miami, and the Peas Tour Bus. In December, it was revealed the group had recorded "They Don't Want Music" with James Brown, and that Monkey Business was being mixed and neared completion. The album was mastered by Brian Gardner at the Bernie Grundman Mastering in Los Angeles.

== Music and lyrics ==
Monkey Business is a hip-hop and pop album incorporating an array of genres, such as crunk, funk, reggae, Raï, calypso, soul, jazz and Latin rock. It opens with "Pump It", a hip-hop-funk track heavily sampling Dick Dale's 1962 surf rock version of "Misirlou". The Bollywood-inspired "Don't Phunk with My Heart" was described as a lyrical sequel to the group's single "Shut Up" (2003), with will.i.am explaining: "When you're on bad terms with a significant other, you don't want to break up. You tell her things and at the time you really mean them. But she's saying, stop fucking with me." "My Style"–the group's second collaboration with Justin Timberlake–features "an ingenious mix of creative beats, subtle full-band backing, and multi-layered vocals". "Don't Lie" is a "breezy, grooving romantic apology". will.i.am claimed the song was written from an experience in which he deceptively bended the truth to an ex-girlfriend: "It's a song about owning up and apologizing and realizing your faults. It's about being a man or a woman – an adult – and confronting situations honestly." "My Humps" is a hip-hop and dance track backed by an electro-influenced drum beat, and ends with a piano-driven hidden track "So Real". The song sparked controversy because of its title and lyrics, which center on a woman who uses her breasts and buttocks to accomplish her goals.

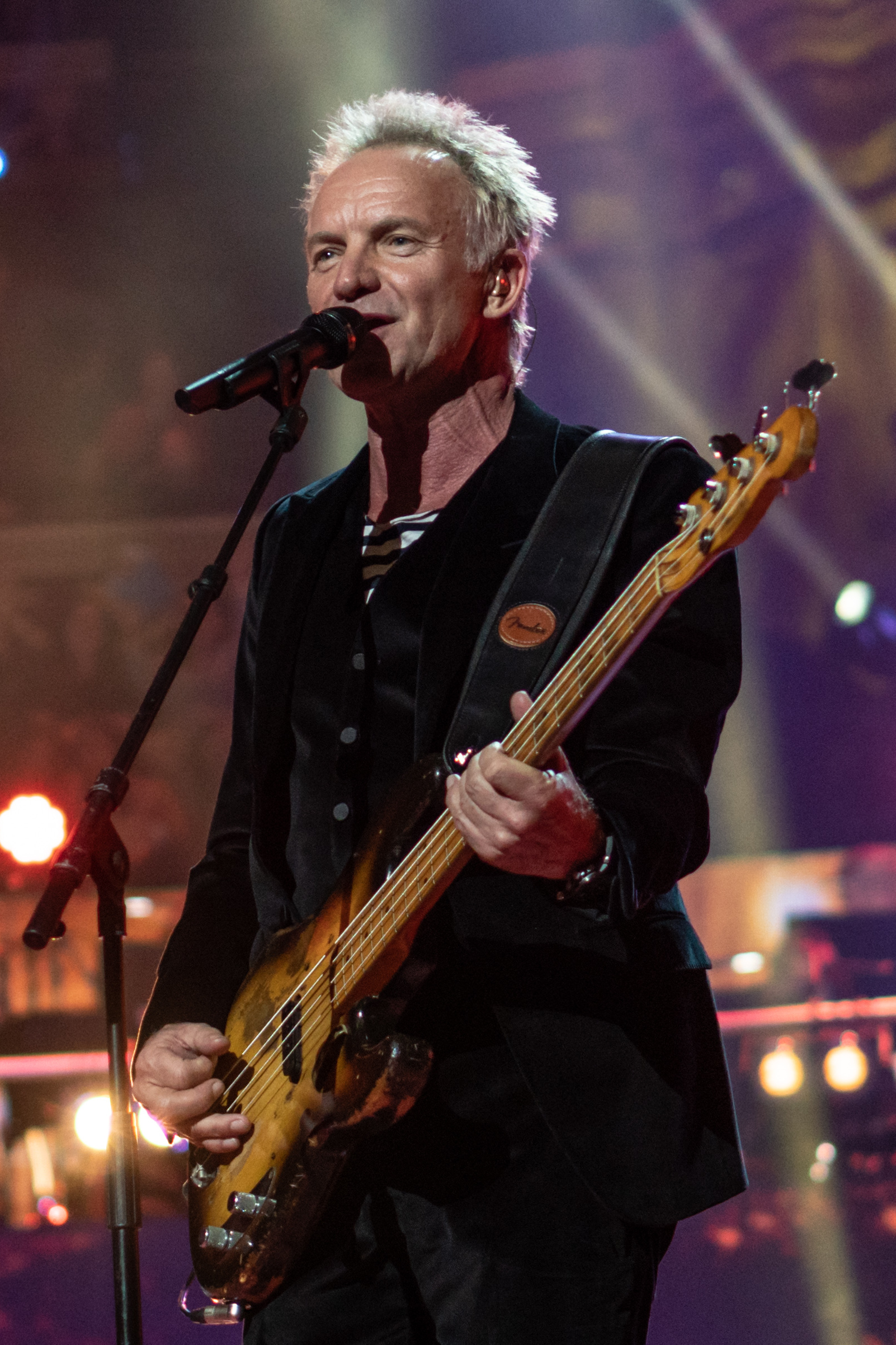
Sting is featured on the album's closing track "Union", which heavily samples his own "Englishman in New York" (1987).

Underground hip-hop track "Like That", featuring Q-Tip, Talib Kweli, CeeLo Green and John Legend, begins with a sample from Astrud Gilberto's 1965 version of "Who Can I Turn To?". The seventh track "Dum Diddly" was described by Neil Drumming from Entertainment Weekly as a "glossy, faux-reggae" track. "Feel It" lyrically encourages its listeners to dance. Country-influenced "Gone Going" addresses the emptiness of materialism. It's built around a hip-hop beat and a live string-horn arrangement. "They Don't Want Music", featuring James Brown, is a horn-driven jazz, lounge and funk track. "Disco Club" is about men "cruising clubs for casual hookups". The "funky" dance track "Bebot", whose title means "hot chick", is rapped entirely in Tagalog, much like "The Apl Song" from Elephunk (2003). "Ba Bump" features its male protagonist getting a woman drunk and having sex with her afterwards. "Audio Delite at Low Fidelity" lyrically details the group's history up until the release of Monkey Business, referencing their rise to prominence; it ends with the hidden track "Change". The album's closing track "Union" heavily samples "Englishman in New York" by Sting, who makes a guest appearance. A jazz-influenced track, it lyrically demands social equality.

== Title and artwork ==
Black Eyed Peas gave numerous explanations for the title of Monkey Business. In the "BEP Q&A" portion of the album's booklet, two definitions of the title were written.

"DEFINITION 1: With success, people treat you differently. They can go from viewing you like a person to viewing you like a product. And that's one definition of Monkey Business."

"DEFINITION 2: Elephants have nothing to do with PHUNK and Monkeys have nothing to do with BUSINESS ...or do they? Our business is PHUNKIN' MUSIC." [sic]

In an interview with The Record, the members described an experience in Paris during their Elephunk Tour (2004) which inspired the title. According to will.i.am, they were inside of a van when a large group of fans came and started banging on its windows and looking inside, to which Taboo said he felt as if they were caged monkeys in a zoo.

The album cover for Monkey Business was photographed by Albert Watson. It depicts Fergie, Taboo, and apl.de.ap surrounding will.i.am as he's shouting into a megaphone, against a red background. Shepard Fairey and Florencio Zavala designed the artwork and its logo, as directed by Mike Jurkovac.

== Release and promotion ==
In May 2004, Black Eyed Peas announced Monkey Business would be released by November. Its release was then postponed to early 2005, before ultimately being set for June 7 in the United States. The promotion of the album had already commenced in January, when the Best Buy commercial featuring the group performing "Pump It" was released. They performed "Don't Phunk with My Heart" for the first time during the 2005/2006 MTV Networks UpFront at the Madison Square Garden on May 3, 2005. The group promoted the album in the United Kingdom by performing "Don't Phunk with My Heart" on the May 6 episode of Top of the Pops and the May 13 episode of Later... with Jools Holland. There, they commenced their promotional tour at the Brixton Academy in London on May 6, and performed at various venues and festivals across Europe and North America, including Wango Tango, until June 2. On June 3, Black Eyed Peas embarked on The Monkey Business Tour at The Joint in Las Vegas; the tour was originally set to commence on June 11, but three earlier dates were later added. "Don't Phunk with My Heart" was subsequently performed at the 2005 MuchMusic Video Awards on June 19, on The Tonight Show with Jay Leno on June 24, at the Live 8 concert in Philadelphia on July 2, and at the 2005 Teen Choice Awards on August 16.

Black Eyed Peas promoted "My Humps" on Total Request Live on November 1, and performed it at the 2005 MTV Europe Music Awards on November 3. At the NRJ Music Awards on January 21, 2006, the group performed a medley of "Don't Phunk with My Heart", "Don't Lie" and "Pump It". On March 21, an extended play (EP) titled Renegotiations: The Remixes was released, including alternative versions of seven non-single tracks from Monkey Business. Simultaneously with The Monkey Business Tour, the group embarked on the 2006 Honda Civic Tour in the US from March 23 until May 21. Live from Sydney to Vegas, a video album documenting The Monkey Business Tour's June 3, 2005 show in Las Vegas and the October 3, 2005 show at the Sydney SuperDome, was released on December 5, 2006. After visiting North America, Asia, Oceania, South America and Europe, The Monkey Business Tour ended on December 29 at the Mandalay Bay in Paradise, Nevada. On September 11, 2007, Black Eyed Peas embarked on the third concert tour in support of Monkey Business, the PepsiCo-sponsored Black Blue & You Tour, visiting select countries across Africa, North America, Europe, South America, Asia and Oceania until October 30.

== Singles ==
In December 2004, MTV News reported "They Don't Want Music", featuring James Brown, would be released as the lead single from Monkey Business in February 2005. However, those plans were scrapped in favor of "Don't Phunk with My Heart", which was released on April 5. It became Black Eyed Peas' highest-peaking single on the US Billboard Hot 100 at the time, peaking at number three. The song peaked atop the charts in Australia, Canada, the Czech Republic, Finland and New Zealand. The digital single was certified gold by the Recording Industry Association of America (RIAA) on June 6, for sales of 500,000 units in the United States. Critically acclaimed, the song won Best Rap Performance by a Duo or Group at the 48th Annual Grammy Awards (2006), while receiving a nomination for Best Rap Song. Directed by The Malloys, its accompanying music video is a parody of game shows such as The Price Is Right, The Dating Game and Love Connection. It was nominated for Best Group Video at the 2005 MTV Video Music Awards.

"Don't Lie" was released as the second single from Monkey Business on June 29, 2005. It failed to duplicate the success of "Don't Phunk with My Heart", partly due to the rising success of "My Humps", which had not been released as a single yet. The song peaked at number 14 on the US Billboard Hot 100, reaching the top ten in Australia, Austria, Canada, CIS, Denmark, Hungary, Italy, the Netherlands, New Zealand, Norway and the United Kingdom, and on the European Hot 100 Singles. Despite a mixed critical reception, the song was nominated for Best Pop Performance by a Duo or Group with Vocals at the 48th Annual Grammy Awards. Its accompanying music video was directed by The Saline Project and shows the members in Rio de Janeiro.

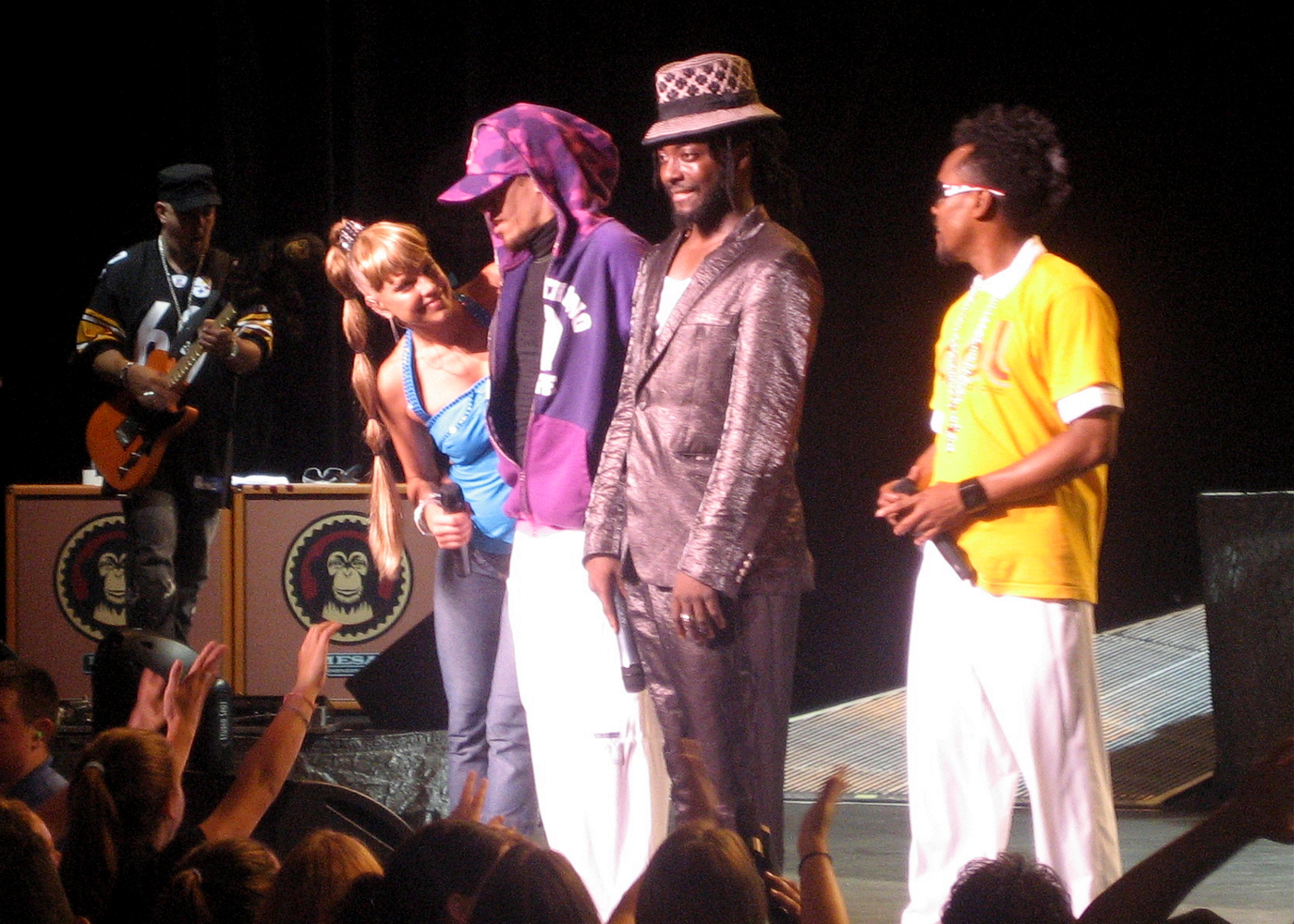
The Black Eyed Peas performing during The Monkey Business Tour on August 24, 2006

"My Humps" became an unsolicited hit on contemporary hit radio across the US, which caused it to be released as the third single Monkey Business on September 20, 2005. It peaked at number three on the US Billboard Hot 100 and atop the charts in Australia, Canada, Ireland and New Zealand. Its mastertone was certified double platinum by the RIAA on June 14, 2006, for sales of two million units in the US. The song received mixed to negative reviews from music critics, who criticized its lyrical content; some even regarded it one of the worst songs ever written. Despite the negative critical reception, it won Best Pop Performance by a Duo or Group with Vocals at the 49th Annual Grammy Awards (2007), while being nominated for numerous other awards, including the MTV Video Music Award for Ringtone of the Year. Its accompanying music video was directed by Fatima Robinson and Malik Sayeed, and shows Fergie dancing with backup dancers as images of expensive items such as Louis Vuitton purses and jewelry, which are supposed to have been bought for her by men, appear on the screen. At the 2006 MTV Video Music Awards, it won Best Hip-Hop Video.

"Pump It" was released as the fourth and final single from Monkey Business on January 16, 2006. It became the lowest-peaking single from the album, peaking at number 18 on the US Billboard Hot 100. Internationally, it reached the top ten in Australia, Belgium, Canada, Croatia, the Czech Republic, Greece, Hungary, Ireland, Italy, New Zealand, Switzerland and the United Kingdom, and on the European Hot 100 Singles. Its accompanying music video was directed by Francis Lawrence and features the group competing and fighting with a gang inside a parking garage.

In July 2005, it was announced that "Like That" would be released simultaneously with "Don't Lie" as the dual second single from Monkey Business; however, only "Don't Lie" was released. "Like That" ended up being released as a promotional single on 12-inch vinyl in late 2005. Its accompanying music video was directed by Syndrome and Nabil Elderkin, and was released on December 13. While it was never released as an official single, it was included on Black Eyed Peas' extended play (EP) Renegotiations: The Remixes (2006), with its music video being an iTunes Store bonus track. "Dum Diddly", whose Noizetrip Remix was a B-side to "Pump It", was released as a promotional single in France in 2006. Grammy Award-nominated "Gone Going" began receiving contemporary hit radio airplay in March 2006, which allowed it to peak at number 37 on the US Mainstream Top 40 despite not being released as a single. In 2006, Patricio Ginelsa directed music videos for two other non-single tracks–"Union" and "Bebot". The latter was filmed in the Philippines in July and was independently funded by the group members. Showcasing the Filipino culture, it features prominent Filipino-American artists and performers, including American Idol's third season third-place finalist Jasmine Trias.

== Critical reception ==
Professional ratings
Aggregate scores
Source	Rating
Metacritic	48/100
Review scores
Source	Rating
AllMusic	2.5/5 stars
Blender	2/5 stars
Entertainment Weekly	C
The Guardian	2/5 stars
Now	1/5 stars
Paste	7/10
PopMatters	5/10
Q	3/5 stars
Rolling Stone	3/5 stars
Slant Magazine	2/5 stars

Monkey Business received mixed reviews from music critics upon its release. At Metacritic, which assigns a normalized rating out of 100 to reviews from mainstream critics, the album has received an average score of 48, indicating "mixed or average reviews", based on 20 reviews. Robert Christgau gave the album a three-star honorable mention, saying: "What all pop might be—so much brighter and kinder than it is". John Bush from AllMusic labeled most of the tracks "the same type of party rap singalong that Black Eyed Peas made their name with on Elephunk", adding: "Monkey Business could easily sell just as well, or better, than Elephunk, but what the group made sound effortless in the past sounds strained and canned here." He selected "Feel It" and "Disco Club" as the album's highlights. Nathan Rabin from The A.V. Club gave the album an unfavorable review, criticizing the album's lyrical content for managing to "devolve even further" than that of Elephunk, as well as what he perceived as lack of originality due to excessive sampling. Nicholas Taylor from PopMatters shared Rabin's sentiments but nevertheless praised the album for being a "great party record". Neil Drumming from Entertainment Weekly declared it "such a bland meringue: a succession of cotton candy raps about chicks, partying, and partying with chicks, broken up by choruses destined to evaporate outside a shindig's perimeter".

Betty Clarke from The Guardian commended Black Eyed Peas' use of the "good-guy rap plus pop-profundity multiplied by numerous special guests" formula but dismissed the lyrical themes. She singled out James Brown's appearance on "They Don't Want Music" as the album's highlight. Courtney Ryan Fitzgerald from Paste praised the album's production, calling its songs "danceable" and "catchy". Rolling Stone editor Christian Hoard was positive towards Monkey Business, calling it "just as bright if not quite as fun as Elephunk". Sal Cinquemani from Slant Magazine condemned the album for being "virtually unlistenable", but classified "Gone Going" as its highlight. Azeem Ahmad from musicOMH felt similarly, saying the album was "impossible to listen to in one sitting because it's too much of a strain on the brain to absorb." Talia Kraines from BBC wrote: "With its witty rhymes and clean lyrics, [Monkey Business] is hip hop for families", but noted the group's downgrade in lyrical themes since their debut studio album, Behind the Front (1998). Jason King from The Village Voice described the album as "zany, antiseptic kitsch, like the soundtrack to the ultimate Old Navy commercial".

== Accolades ==
Awards and nominations for Monkey Business
Year	Award	Category	Nominee(s)	Result	Ref.
2005	Teen Choice Award	Choice Music – Summer Song	"Don't Phunk with My Heart"	Nominated	
2005	Teen Choice Award	Choice Music – Party Starter	"Don't Phunk with My Heart"	Won	
2005	MTV Video Music Award	Best Group Video	"Don't Phunk with My Heart"	Nominated	
2005	Mnet Asian Music Award	Best International Artist	"Don't Lie"	Won	
2005	IFPI Hong Kong Top Sales Music Award	Ten Best Sales Releases, Foreign	Monkey Business	Won	
2006	NRJ Music Award	International Album of the Year	Monkey Business	Won	
2006	Grammy Award	Best Rap Performance by a Duo or Group	"Don't Phunk with My Heart"	Won	
2006	Grammy Award	Best Rap Song	"Don't Phunk with My Heart"	Nominated	
2006	Grammy Award	Best Pop Collaboration with Vocals	"Gone Going"	Nominated	
2006	Grammy Award	Best Pop Performance by a Duo or Group with Vocals	"Don't Lie"	Nominated	
2006	Soul Train Music Award	Best R&B/Soul Album – Group, Band or Duo	Monkey Business	Won	
2006	Soul Train Music Award	Best R&B/Soul or Rap Dance Cut	"My Humps"	Nominated	
2006	Juno Award	International Album of the Year	Monkey Business	Won	
2006	MTV Australia Video Music Award	Best Hip-Hop Video	"Don't Phunk with My Heart"	Nominated	
2006	MTV Video Music Award Japan	Best Group Video	"Don't Phunk with My Heart"	Nominated	
2006	MTV Video Music Award Japan	Best Pop Video	"Don't Phunk with My Heart"	Nominated	
2006	MTV Video Music Award Japan	Album of the Year	Monkey Business	Nominated	
2006	Myx Music Award	Favorite International Video	"My Humps"	Nominated	
2006	MuchMusic Video Award	Best International Group Video	"My Humps"	Nominated	
2006	MTV Video Music Award	Best Hip Hop Video	"My Humps"	Won	
2006	MTV Video Music Award	Ringtone of the Year	"My Humps"	Nominated	
2007	Grammy Award	Best Pop Performance by a Duo or Group with Vocals	"My Humps"	Won	

== Commercial performance ==
In the United States, Monkey Business debuted and peaked at number two on the Billboard 200 chart dated June 25, 2005, behind Coldplay's X&Y, with first-week sales of 291,000 units. Black Eyed Peas' first top-ten album on the chart, it spent its first 23 weeks within the top ten, later spending additional five non-consecutive weeks there. The album debuted atop both the Top R&B/Hip-Hop Albums and Top Rap Albums, becoming their first number-one album on both charts. It placed within the top 20 on the year-end Billboard 200 in both 2005 and 2006, and has spent a total of 73 weeks on the Billboard 200 as of 2023. The album was certified triple platinum by the Recording Industry Association of America (RIAA) for shipments of three million units on December 21, 2005. By 2011, it had sold over four million copies in the US.

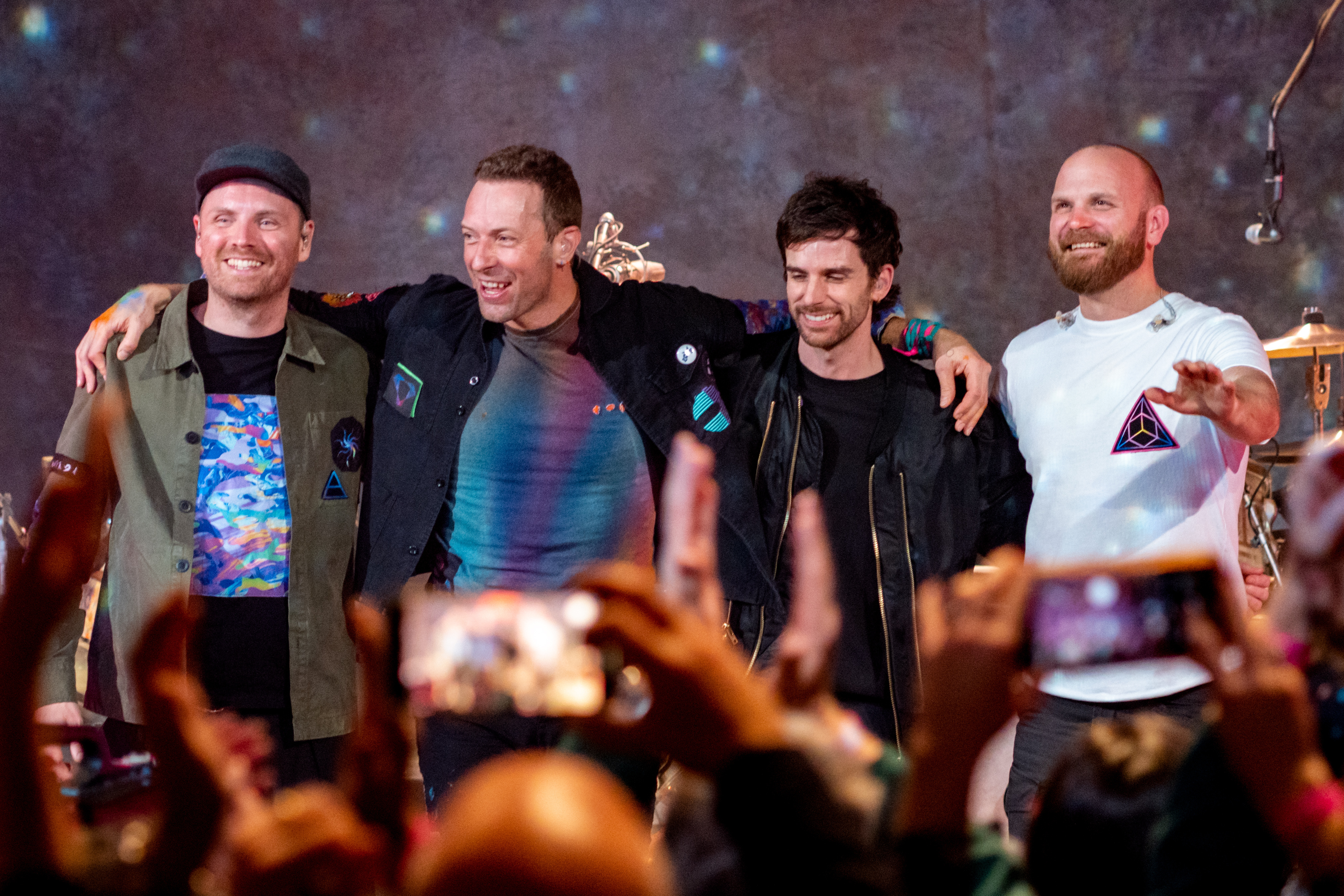
Coldplay blocked the Black Eyed Peas from the top spot of the US Billboard 200 with their album X&Y (2005).

Monkey Business debuted at number two on the Canadian Albums Chart dated June 25, 2005. It peaked atop the chart in its fourth week, spending seven weeks at the summit and a total of 34 weeks charting. The album was certified sextuple platinum by the Canadian Recording Industry Association (CRIA) on March 24, 2006. In Mexico, the album peaked atop the Top 100 Mexico chart, being certified platinum+gold by the Asociación Mexicana de Productores de Fonogramas y Videogramas (AMPROFON). It was a commercial success across Oceania as well, debuting at number one in both Australia and New Zealand. The album has been certified sextuple platinum by the Australian Recording Industry Association (ARIA) and quadruple platinum by the Recorded Music NZ (RMNZ). In Japan, it peaked at number three on the Oricon Albums Chart, where it has spent a total of 72 weeks, and has been certified platinum by the Recording Industry Association of Japan (RIAJ).

Monkey Business fared similarly in Europe, where it debuted atop the European Top 100 Albums. It also debuted at number one in France, Germany and Switzerland, while reaching the top ten in Austria, Belgium, Denmark, Finland, Greece, Hungary, Ireland, Italy, the Netherlands, Portugal and Spain. International Federation of the Phonographic Industry (IFPI) certified the album double platinum for sales of two million copies across Europe. In the United Kingdom, it debuted at number four on the UK Albums Chart, atop the UK R&B Albums Chart, and at number five on the Scottish Albums Chart, with first-week sales of 49,260 copies. The album has also been certified triple platinum by the British Phonographic Industry (BPI), selling over a million copies in the country by June 2009, according to Music Week. Monkey Business was the world's fourth best-selling album of 2005, and has sold over nine million copies worldwide.

== Controversy ==
Following the release of Elephunk (2003), Black Eyed Peas were criticized and alleged by critics and media outlets to have sold out. The group had previously criticized other artists for selling out, and the group was further scrutinzed throughout the promotional campaign for Monkey Business. Some critics claimed their endorsements of various companies caused them to suffer from overexposure; Nathan Rabin from The A.V. Club stated: "With Elephunk, Black Eyed Peas made the rare leap from underrated and overlooked to obnoxiously (and undeservedly) overexposed." Sal Cinquemani from Slant Magazine was especially critical of the group's newfound popularity and commercial success, labeling them "disposable pop". will.i.am responded to the backlash by stating:

"We don't do anything that doesn't fit with the music. We kinda lend ourselves to benefits so we did the Democratic National Convention to get people out there to vote. And then we'll do a Best Buy commercial 'cause they sell music. Then we did the first iTunes commercial. We did the NBA 'cause it's like, who's not gonna do the NBA? We did the Super Bowl, 'cause who ain't gonna do the Super Bowl? And if they asked you to do two years at the Grammys, you ain't gonna do it? And then we did the Emmys 'cause they said, 'Ain't nobody ever did the Emmys.'"

Further controversy arose over the lyrical content of "My Humps", the third single from Monkey Business. The song centers on a female protagonist using her breasts and buttocks in order to accomplish her goals, namely expensive material goods. Multiple publications labeled the song sexist and misogynistic. Some critics even regarded it as the worst song ever written.

== Track listing ==
All tracks are produced by will.i.am, except where noted.

Monkey Business
No.	Title	Writer(s)	Producer(s)	Length
1.	"Pump It"	William Adams; Allan Pineda; Stacy Ferguson; Thomas van Musser; Nicolas Roubanis		3:33
2.	"Don't Phunk with My Heart"	Adams; Ferguson; Printz Board; George Pajon, Jr.; Full Force; Kalyanji Anandiji; Indeewar		3:59
3.	"My Style" (featuring Justin Timberlake)	Adams; Pineda; Ferguson; van Musser; Timberlake; Timothy Mosley; Nate Hills	Timbaland; Danja^{[a]}	4:28
4.	"Don't Lie"	Adams; Pineda; Jaime Gomez; Ferguson; Chris Peters; Drew Peters; Ricky Walters	will.i.am; Ron Fair^{[b]}	3:39
5.	"My Humps"	Adams; David Payton		5:26
6.	"Like That" (featuring Q-Tip, Talib Kweli, CeeLo Green and John Legend)	Adams; Pineda; Gomez; Kamaal Fareed; Talib Kweli Greene; Anthony Newley; Leslie Bricusse		4:34
7.	"Dum Diddly" (featuring Dante Santiago)	Adams; Pineda; Ray Brady; Board; Jackie Mittoo; Lloyd Ferguson; Fitzroy Simpson; Robbie Lyn; Leroy Sibbles; Huford Brown; Felix Headley Bennett		4:19
8.	"Feel It"	Adams; Pineda; Ferguson	apl.de.ap; Printz Board^{[a]}; will.i.am^{[a]}	4:19
9.	"Gone Going"	Adams; Jack Johnson		3:13
10.	"They Don't Want Music" (featuring James Brown)	Adams; Ferguson; J. Brown; Board; Timothy Orindgreff; Greg Mays; Darryl Barnes		6:46
11.	"Disco Club"	Adams; Pineda; Jean Baptiste; Anthony Tidd; Michael Matthews; Melvin Lewis	Noize Trip	3:48
12.	"Bebot"	Adams; Pineda		3:30
13.	"Ba Bump"	Adams; Board; Larry Blackmon; Thomas Jenkins	Board; will.i.am^{[a]}	3:56
14.	"Audio Delite at Low Fidelity"	Adams; Pineda; Keith Harris; Rick James		5:29
15.	"Union" (featuring Sting)	Adams; Ferguson; Sting; Pajon		5:04

20th anniversary edition
No.	Title	Writer(s)	Producer(s)	Length
16.	"Shake Your Monkey"	Adams		3:55
17.	"Shake Your Monkey" (will.i.am Remix)	Adams		3:43
18.	"Bend Your Back"	Adams; Harris; Pajon		3:44
19.	"Make Them Hear You"	Adams		3:19
20.	"Do What You Want"	Adams; Brady; John Legend		4:03
21.	"If You Want Love"	Adams; Pineda; Gomez; Ferguson; Board; Orindgreff; Pajon		4:56
22.	"Pump It" (Travis Barker Remix)	Adams; Pineda; van Musser; Ferguson; Roubanis	will.i.am; Travis Barker^{[b]}	3:36
23.	"Don't Phunk with My Heart" (Chicago House Remix)	Adams; Ferguson; Board; Pajon; Full Force; Anandiji; Indeewar	will.i.am; Fair; Harris^{[b]}	3:46
24.	"My Style" (DJ Premier Remix)	Adams; Pineda; Ferguson; van Musser; Mosley; Hills	Timbaland; Danja; DJ Premier^{[b]}	4:28
25.	"Don't Lie" (Beets & Produce, NY Mix)	Adams; Pineda; Gomez; Ferguson; Peters; Peters; Walters	will.i.am; Board^{[b]}	4:08
26.	"My Humps" (Lil Jon Remix)	Adams; Payton	will.i.am; Lil Jon^{[b]}	3:45
27.	"Dum Diddly" (Noizetrip Remix)	Adams; Pineda; Brady; Board; Bennett; Brown; L. Ferguson; Lyn; Mittoo; Sibbles; Simpson	will.i.am; Noize Trip^{[b]}	4:06
28.	"Feel It" (Jazzy Jeff Soulful Remix)	Adams; Payton	apl.de.ap; Board; will.i.am^{[a]}; DJ Jazzy Jeff^{[b]}	4:54
29.	"They Don't Want Music" (Pete Rock Remix)	Adams; Ferguson; J. Brown; Board; Orindgreff; Mays; Barnes	will.i.am; Pete Rock^{[b]}	6:26
30.	"Disco Club" (Large Pro Peas Remix)	Adams; Pineda; Baptiste; Tidd; Matthews; Lewis	Noize Trip; Large Professor^{[b]}	3:50
31.	"Ba Bump" (Erick Sermon Remix)	Adams; Board; Blackmon; Jenkins	will.i.am; Board; Erick Sermon^{[b]}	3:08

=== Notes ===
- ^{^a} signifies a co-producer
- ^{^b} signifies an additional producer
- "My Humps" contains the hidden outro "So Real".
- Track 20 originally appeared on international editions.
- Track 21 originally appeared on UK and Japanese editions.
- Track 19 originally appeared on Japanese editions.
- Tracks 22 and 27 originally appeared on the Asian special edition.
- Japanese tour edition pressings include a bonus DVD containing music videos for "Don't Phunk with My Heart" and "Don't Lie", alongside an interview.
- Asian special edition pressings include a bonus DVD containing music videos for "Don't Phunk with My Heart", "Don't Lie", "My Humps", "Pump It", and "Like That".

Sample credits

- "Pump It" contains samples from "Misirlou" by Dick Dale.
- "Don't Phunk with My Heart" contains an interpolation from "I Wonder If I Take You Home" by Lisa Lisa and Cult Jam with Full Force, a sample from "Ae Naujawan Hai Sab Kuchch Yahan" by Asha Bhosle, and a sample from "Yeh Mera Dil Yaar Ka Diwana" by Bhosle.
- "Don't Lie" contains a sample from "The Ruler's Back" by Slick Rick.
- "My Humps" contains an interpolation from "I Need a Freak" by Sexual Harassment.
- "Like That" contains a sample from "Who Can I Turn To?" by Astrud Gilberto.
- "Dum Diddly" contains an interpolation from "Pass the Dutchie" by Musical Youth.
- "Gone Going" contains an interpolation from "Gone" by Jack Johnson.
- "They Don't Want Music" contains an interpolation from "Let's Make It Funky" by Nice & Smooth.
- "Ba Bump" contains samples from "Candy" by Cameo.
- "Audio Delite at Low Fidelity" contains samples from "All Night Long" by Mary Jane Girls.
- "Union" contains an interpolation from "Englishman in New York" by Sting.

== Personnel ==
Credits are adapted from the liner notes of Monkey Business.

- apl.de.ap – vocals (tracks 1–4, 6–8, 10–12, 14–15), Clavinet (track 8), drum machine (track 8), strings (track 8), production (track 8)
- Marcella Araica – recording engineering assistance (track 3), Pro-Tools editing (track 3)
- Charlie Baccarat – electric violin (track 2)
- Printz Board – Mellotron strings (tracks 2, 7–8), Mellotron keyboards (track 13), Moog synthesizer (tracks 7 and 10), synthesizer (tracks 8 and 13), bass (tracks 8 and 10), drums (track 8), drum machine (track 13), trumpet (tracks 9–11 and 13), keyboards (track 10), Rhodes piano (track 10), production (tracks 8 and 13)
- Ray Brady – guitar (tracks 4 and 7)
- James Brown – vocals (track 10)
- Venus Brown – backing vocals (track 10), A&R management
- Demo Castelleon – recording engineering (track 3)
- Mino Cinelu – percussion (track 15)
- Fred Davis – legal representation
- Dylan "3-D" Dresdow – vocal recording engineering (track 8)
- Ron Fair – executive production, additional production (track 4), string arrangements (tracks 2 and 9), string conducting (track 9), harmonica (track 4)
- Shepard Fairey – album cover design, logo design
- Fergie – vocals (tracks 1–8, 10–11, 13, 15)
- Mike Fratantuno – bass (track 13)
- Seth Friedman – A&R management, cover art direction, management
- Brian Gardner – mastering
- Şerban Ghenea – mixing (tracks 5, 10–12 and 15)
- Dennis Gomez – booklet design
- Cee-Lo Green – vocals (track 6)
- Keith Harris – live drums (track 7), drums (tracks 2, 7, 13 and 14), keyboards (track 7), Mellotron strings (track 7), percussion (track 8)
- Tal Herzberg – recording engineering (tracks 1, 2, 4 and 9), Pro-Tools programming (tracks 2 and 4)
- Julie Hovsepian – product management
- Ted Howard – recording engineering (track 6)
- Tippa Irie – backing vocals (track 7)
- Jack Johnson – guitar (track 9), vocals (track 9)
- Mike Jurkovac – cover art direction
- Manu Katche – drums (track 15)
- Kenny Kirkland – keyboards (track 15)
- Talib Kweli – vocals (track 6)
- Sarah Larkin – business management
- John Legend – vocals (track 6)
- Melvin "Chaos" Lewis – recording engineering (track 11), bass (track 11), drum machine (track 11)
- Jimmy Limon – bass (track 12), Clavinet (track 12), organ (track 12), drum machine (track 12), percussion (track 12), guitar (track 12)
- Lor-e – styling
- Branford Marsalis – soprano saxophone (track 15)
- Edward Martinez – booklet art direction, photography
- Tony Maserati – mixing (tracks 3, 7, 8 and 13)
- Michael Matthews – guitar (track 11)
- Polo Molina – management
- Osinachi Nwaneri – recording engineering (track 6)
- Tim "Izo" Orindgreff – saxophone (tracks 9–11 and 13), flute (track 13)
- George Pajon Jr. – guitar (tracks 1–4, 8, 10 and 13)
- Jack Joseph Puig – mixing (track 9)
- Q-Tip – vocals (track 6)
- Kevin Rudolf – guitar (track 3)
- Dante Santiago – backing vocals (tracks 8, 10, 11, 13 and 16–18), vocals (track 7), A&R management coordination
- Justin Siegel – A&R management coordination
- Madeleine Smith – music clearance
- David Sonenberg – management
- Mike "Spike" Stent – mixing (tracks 1, 2 and 4)
- Sting – vocals (track 15), bass (track 15)
- Taboo – vocals (tracks 1–4, 6–8, 11, 13 and 15)
- Robert "Mousey" Thompson – bass (track 10), Clavinet (track 10), drums (track 10), drum machine (track 10), organ (track 10)
- Justin Timberlake – vocals (track 3)
- Timbaland – vocals (track 3), all other instruments (track 3)
- Neil Tucker – recording engineering (tracks 2, 8, 10, 11 and 13)
- Andrew Van Meter – production management
- Jason Villaroman – recording engineering (tracks 1, 3–5, 7, 12, 14 and 15)
- Jeff Watkins – saxophone (track 10)
- Albert Watson – photography
- will.i.am – executive production, conceptual design, production (tracks 1, 2, 4–10 and 12–15), mixing (track 14), vocals (all tracks), bass (tracks 1, 4, 5, 7, 9, 10, 12 and 14), drum machine (1, 4, 5, 7, 9, 12 and 15), drums (track 15), synthesizer (tracks 1, 7, 12 and 14), Clavinet (tracks 5 and 11), organ (tracks 5 and 9), Rhodes piano (tracks 8 and 11), additional instruments (track 6)
- Ethan Willoughby – recording engineering (track 6), mixing (track 6)
- Damon Woods – guitar (track 10)
- Florencio Zavala – album cover design, logo design

== Charts ==
=== Weekly charts ===
2005–2006 weekly chart performance
Chart	Peak position
Australian Albums (ARIA)	1
Australian Urban Albums (ARIA)	1
Austrian Albums (Ö3 Austria)	2
Belgian Albums (Ultratop Flanders)	4
Belgian Albums (Ultratop Wallonia)	7
Canadian Albums (Billboard)	1
Czech Albums (ČNS IFPI)	3
Danish Albums (Hitlisten)	3
Dutch Albums (Album Top 100)	3
European Top 100 Albums (Billboard)	1
Finnish Albums (Suomen virallinen lista)	4
French Albums (SNEP)	1
German Albums (Offizielle Top 100)	1
Greek Albums (IFPI)	3
Hungarian Albums (MAHASZ)	5
Irish Albums (IRMA)	7
Italian Albums (FIMI)	10
Japanese Albums (Oricon)	3
Malaysian International Albums (RIM)	2
Mexican Albums (Top 100 Mexico)	1
New Zealand Albums (RMNZ)	1
Norwegian Albums (VG-lista)	15
Polish Albums (ZPAV)	13
Portuguese Albums (AFP)	5
Scottish Albums (Official Charts)	5
Singaporean Albums (RIAS)	1
Spanish Albums (Promusicae)	5
Swedish Albums (Sverigetopplistan)	16
Swiss Albums (Schweizer Hitparade)	1
Taiwanese Albums (Five Music)	1
UK Albums (Official Charts)	4
UK R&B Albums (Official Charts)	1
US Billboard 200	2
US Top R&B/Hip-Hop Albums (Billboard)	1

=== Monthly charts ===
2005 monthly chart performance
Chart	Peak position
South Korean International Albums (RIAK)	9

=== Year-end charts ===
2005 year-end chart performance
Chart	Position
Australian Albums (ARIA)	5
Austrian Albums (Ö3 Austria)	37
Belgian Albums (Ultratop Flanders)	36
Belgian Albums (Ultratop Wallonia)	35
Danish Albums (Hitlisten)	51
Dutch Albums (Album Top 100)	32
European Top 100 Albums (Billboard)	13
French Albums (SNEP)	30
German Albums (Offizielle Top 100)	34
Hungarian Albums (MAHASZ)	42
Italian Albums (FIMI)	68
Japanese Albums (Oricon)	45
Mexican Albums (Top 100 Mexico)	55
New Zealand Albums (RMNZ)	5
South Korean International Albums (RIAK)	21
Swedish Albums (Sverigetopplistan)	68
Swiss Albums (Schweizer Hitparade)	14
UK Albums (OCC)	21
US Billboard 200	18
US Top R&B/Hip-Hop Albums (Billboard)	23
Worldwide Albums (IFPI)	4

2006 year-end chart performance
Chart	Position
Australian Albums (ARIA)	19
Belgian Albums (Ultratop Flanders)	13
Belgian Albums (Ultratop Wallonia)	30
Danish Albums (Hitlisten)	61
Dutch Albums (Album Top 100)	67
European Top 100 Albums (Billboard)	11
French Albums (SNEP)	17
German Albums (Offizielle Top 100)	62
Italian Albums (FIMI)	50
Mexican Albums (Top 100 Mexico)	2
Spanish Albums (PROMUSICAE)	50
Swedish Albums (Sverigetopplistan)	92
Swiss Albums (Schweizer Hitparade)	42
UK Albums (OCC)	61
US Billboard 200	14
US Top R&B/Hip-Hop Albums (Billboard)	21
Worldwide Albums (IFPI)	28

=== Decade-end charts ===
2000s decade-end chart performance
Chart	Position
Australian Albums (ARIA)	27
US Billboard 200	67

== Certifications ==
Certifications and sales
Region	Certification	Certified units/sales
Argentina (CAPIF)	Platinum	40,000^{^}
Australia (ARIA)	6× Platinum	420,000^{^}
Austria (IFPI Austria)	Gold	15,000^{*}
Belgium (BRMA)	2× Platinum	100,000^{*}
Brazil (Pro-Música Brasil)	Gold	50,000^{*}
Canada (Music Canada)	6× Platinum	600,000^{^}
France (SNEP)	2× Gold	200,000^{*}
Germany (BVMI)	Platinum	200,000^{^}
Greece (IFPI Greece)	Gold	10,000^{^}
Hungary (MAHASZ)	Gold	5,000^{^}
Ireland (IRMA)	2× Platinum	30,000^{^}
Italy (FIMI) sales 2005–2006	Platinum	120,000
Italy (FIMI) sales since 2009	Gold	25,000^{‡}
Japan (RIAJ)	Platinum	250,000^{^}
Mexico (AMPROFON)	Platinum+Gold	150,000^{^}
New Zealand (RMNZ)	5× Platinum	75,000^{‡}
Poland (ZPAV)	Platinum	40,000^{*}
Portugal (AFP)	2× Platinum	40,000^{^}
Russia (NFPF)	4× Platinum	80,000^{*}
Singapore (RIAS)	Gold	5,000^{*}
South Korea	—	17,434
Spain (Promusicae)	Platinum	100,000^{^}
Sweden (GLF)	Gold	30,000^{^}
Switzerland (IFPI Switzerland)	2× Platinum	80,000^{^}
United Kingdom (BPI)	4× Platinum	1,065,834
United States (RIAA)	5× Platinum	5,000,000^{‡}
Summaries
Europe (IFPI)	2× Platinum	2,000,000^{*}
^{*} Sales figures based on certification alone.^{^} Shipments figures based on certification alone.^{‡} Sales+streaming figures based on certification alone.

== Release history ==
Release dates and formats
Region	Date	Edition(s)	Format(s)	Label(s)	Ref.
Italy	May 25, 2005	Standard	CD	Universal	
Denmark	May 26, 2005	Standard	CD	Universal	
Germany	May 26, 2005	Standard	CD	Universal	
Japan	May 27, 2005	Standard	CD	Universal	
Argentina	May 30, 2005	Standard	CD	Universal	
Australia	May 30, 2005	Standard	CD	Universal	
France	May 30, 2005	Standard	CD	Polydor	
South Korea	May 30, 2005	Standard	Cassette; CD	Universal	
United Kingdom	May 30, 2005	Standard	CD	Polydor	
Poland	May 31, 2005	Standard	CD	Universal	
Canada	June 7, 2005	Standard	CD	Universal	
New Zealand	June 7, 2005	Standard	CD	Universal	
United States	June 7, 2005	Standard	CD; vinyl	A&M; Interscope; will.i.am	
Japan	August 31, 2005	Tour	CD+DVD	Universal	
South Korea	February 10, 2006	Special	CD+DVD	Universal	
Europe	September 30, 2016	Standard	Vinyl	Universal	
Various	June 6, 2025	20th anniversary	Digital download; streaming	Interscope	
Various	May 29, 2026	Standard	Vinyl	Interscope; UM^{e}	

== See also ==
- Black Eyed Peas discography
- List of Billboard number-one R&B/hip-hop albums of 2005
- List of number-one albums of 2005 (Australia)
- List of number-one albums of 2005 (Canada)
- List of number-one albums of 2005 (France)
- List of number-one hits of 2005 (Germany)
- List of number-one albums of 2005 (Mexico)
- List of number-one albums from the 2000s (New Zealand)
- List of UK R&B Albums Chart number ones of 2005
