= Renegotiations: The Remixes =

EP by the Black Eyed Peas
- Released: March 21, 2006
- Recorded: 2004–2006
- Genre: Hip-hop
- Length: 31:31
- Label: A&M; Interscope; will.i.am
- Producer: apl.de.ap; Printz Board; Danja; DJ Jazzy Jeff; DJ Premier; Noize Trip; Erick Sermon; Large Professor; Pete Rock; Timbaland; will.i.am

The Black Eyed Peas chronology
Monkey Business (2005)	Renegotiations: The Remixes (2006)	The E.N.D. (2009)

Renegotiations: The Remixes is the first extended play (EP) by American group the Black Eyed Peas. It was released on March 21, 2006, by A&M Records, Interscope Records and will.i.am Music Group. The EP includes alternative versions of non-single tracks from the group's fourth studio album Monkey Business (2005).

== Critical reception ==
Professional ratings
Review scores
Source	Rating
AllMusic	4/5 stars
HipHopDX	2.5/5 stars
Okayplayer	3.5/5 stars

Renegotiations: The Remixes received generally favorable reviews from music critics. John Bush from AllMusic praised the EP: "If these [remixes] had appeared on Monkey Business, the album would have been (setting aside "My Humps" and "Don't Phunk with My Heart") one of the best rap records of the year. Perhaps it's better this way, with the pop productions sequestered on Monkey Business and this tight EP the perfect choice for hip-hop fans." J-23 from HipHopDX was also positive towards the EP but was critical of some tracks due to their original versions: "Despite not being able to overcome shortcomings that come via Monkey Business, this EP is dope in places and is at least very respectable in its efforts." Adrian Ruhi from Okayplayer commended the EP, claiming it served as "a statement that they still have their hip-hop sensibilities, despite the fact that some of the originally poppy tracks sound a bit awkward when remixed by old school producers."

== Track listing ==
Renegotiations: The Remixes
No.	Title	Writer(s)	Producer(s)	Length
1.	"Like That" (featuring Q-Tip, Talib Kweli, Cee-Lo and John Legend)	William Adams; Allan Pineda; Jamie Gomez; Kamaal Fareed; Talib Kweli Greene; Anthony Newley; Leslie Bricusse	will.i.am	4:36
2.	"Ba Bump" (Erick Sermon Remix)	Adams; Printz Board; Larry Blackmon; Thomas Jenkins	Printz Board; will.i.am^{[a]}; Erick Sermon^{[b]}	3:08
3.	"My Style" (DJ Premier Remix) (featuring Justin Timberlake)	Adams; Pineda; Stacy Ferguson; Thomas van Musser; Timberlake; Timothy Mosley; Nate Hills	Timbaland; Danja^{[a]}; DJ Premier^{[b]}	4:27
4.	"They Don't Want Music" (Pete Rock Remix) (featuring James Brown)	Adams; Brown; Ferguson; Board; Timothy Grindgreff; Greg Mays; Darryl Barnes	will.i.am; Pete Rock^{[b]}	6:25
5.	"Feel It" (Jazzy Jeff Soulful Remix)	Adams; Pineda; Ferguson	apl.de.ap; Board^{[a]}; will.i.am^{[a]}; DJ Jazzy Jeff^{[b]}	4:53
6.	"Audio Delite at Low Fidelity" (edit)	Adams; Pineda; Keith Harris; Rick James	will.i.am	4:02
7.	"Disco Club" (Large Pro Peas Remix)	Adams; Pineda; Jean Baptiste; J. Lewis; Michael Matthews; Anthony Tidd	Noize Trip; Large Professor^{[b]}	3:50

Notes

- ^{^a} signifies a co-producer
- ^{^b} signifies an additional producer
- iTunes Store edition includes the music video for "Like That".

== Charts ==
Weekly chart performance for Renegotiations: The Remixes
Chart (2006)	Peak position
Japanese Albums (Oricon)	23

== Certifications ==
Certifications and sales for Renegotiations: The Remixes
Region	Certification	Certified units/sales
Russia (NFPF)	Gold	10,000^{*}
^{*} Sales figures based on certification alone.

== Release history ==
Release dates and formats for Renegotiations: The Remixes
Region	Date	Format(s)	Label(s)	Ref.
United States	March 21, 2006	Digital download	A&M; Interscope; will.i.am	
United States	March 28, 2006	CD	A&M; Interscope; will.i.am	
Japan	May 17, 2006	CD	Universal Music	
