= In tha Beginning...There Was Rap =

In tha Beginning... There Was Rap

Compilation album by Various artists
- Released: November 25, 1997
- Recorded: 1997
- Genre: Hip hop
- Length: 57:59
- Label: Priority
- Producer: Shock G, The Angel, Romeo Antonio, Adam, CD, Chops, Manifest, The Dotrix, Walter Taylor, Amp Live

Professional ratings
Review scores
| Source | Rating |
|---|---|
| AllMusic | 3/5 stars |
| Entertainment Weekly | C+ |
| The Source | 2.5/5 stars |

In tha Beginning... There Was Rap is a compilation album presented by Priority Records, released on November 25, 1997. The album featured cover versions of classic old school hip hop songs done by some of hip hop's most popular acts at the time.

The album peaked at No. 15 on the Billboard 200 and No. 4 on the Billboard Top R&B/Hip-Hop Albums chart. Less than two months after its release on January 9, 1998, it was certified gold for sales of 500,000 copies.

== Track listing ==
| No. | Title | Performer(s) | Length |
|---|---|---|---|
| 1. | "Sucker M.C.'s" (Original song by Run-DMC) | Wu-Tang Clan | 3:46 |
| 2. | "Fuck tha Police" (Original song by NWA) | Bone Thugs-N-Harmony | 5:02 |
| 3. | "Big Ole Butt" (Original song by LL Cool J) | Puff Daddy, Lil Cease | 5:23 |
| 4. | "6 in the Mornin'" (Original song by Ice-T) | Master P | 2:59 |
| 5. | "Freaky Tales" (Original song by Too Short) | Snoop Doggy Dogg | 3:55 |
| 6. | "Knick Knack Patty Wack" (Original song by EPMD) | Tha Dogg Pound | 4:19 |
| 7. | "Rapper's Delight" (Original song by Sugar Hill Gang) | Def Squad Redman/Erick Sermon/Keith Murray | 6:55 |
| 8. | "I'm Still #1" (Original song by Boogie Down Productions) | Cypress Hill | 5:12 |
| 9. | "I Need a Freak" (Original song by Sexual Harassment) | Too Short | 5:19 |
| 10. | "Dopeman" (Original song by NWA) | Mack 10 | 4:03 |
| 11. | "Money Dollar Bill Y'all" (Original song by Jimmy Spicer) | Coolio | 4:42 |
| 12. | "The Show" (Original song by Doug E. Fresh/Slick Rick) | The Roots | 6:24 |

== Charts ==
=== Weekly charts ===
| Chart (1997) | Peak position |
|---|---|
| US Billboard 200 | 15 |
| US Top R&B/Hip-Hop Albums (Billboard) | 4 |

=== Year-end charts ===
| Chart (1998) | Position |
|---|---|
| US Billboard 200 | 110 |
| US Top R&B/Hip-Hop Albums (Billboard) | 61 |

== Certifications ==
| Region | Certification | Certified units/sales |
|---|---|---|
| United States (RIAA) | Gold | 500,000^{^} |
^{^} Shipments figures based on certification alone.
