= Pump It =

2006 single by The Black Eyed Peas

Single by The Black Eyed Peas

from the album Monkey Business
- Released: January 16, 2006
- Genre: Hip hop; dance; rap rock; surf
- Length: 3:33
- Label: A&M; Interscope; will.i.am
- Songwriters: William Adams; Allan Pineda; Stacy Ferguson; Thomas Van Musser; Nicholas Roubanis
- Producer: will.i.am

The Black Eyed Peas singles chronology
"My Humps" (2005)	"Pump It" (2006)	"Mas que Nada" (2006)

Music video
- "Pump It" on YouTube

"Pump It" is a song recorded by American group the Black Eyed Peas for their fourth studio album Monkey Business (2005). It was written by group members will.i.am, apl.de.ap and Fergie, along with frequent songwriting collaborator Thomas van Musser, and produced by will.i.am. The song heavily incorporates music from Dick Dale's 1962 surf version of "Misirlou", known for being featured in the 1994 Quentin Tarantino film Pulp Fiction, hence crediting Nicholas Roubanis as a co-writer. It was released as the fourth and final single from Monkey Business on January 16, 2006, by A&M Records and Interscope Records.

"Pump It" became the Black Eyed Peas' fourth consecutive top-20 single on the US Billboard Hot 100, peaking at number 18, while reaching the top ten in 13 countries worldwide. The song was remixed for the deluxe edition of the group's fifth studio album The E.N.D. (2009), titled "Pump It Harder". It has also appeared in the soundtrack of the film Garfield: A Tail of Two Kitties. An EDM version by Dutch DJ Tiësto, titled "Pump It Louder", is featured on their seventh studio album Drive (2023) as the album's fifth lead single.

== Origins ==
"I was in Brazil doing some CD," The Black Eyed Peas member will.i.am recalls. "I came across this compilation [disk] and I thought it was one thing but it turned out to be something else. The Dick Dale song Miserlou was on it. At first, I was angry this isn't what I wanted to buy," he laughs. "But then, really, that song is hot. I said, 'We should do a song like this.' I jump-started the computer and made some beats on the train. Then we had to fly to Tokyo and I tightened up the beat on the plane. Then I recorded vocals in this park in Tokyo, and that's how we recorded the song 'Pump It'."

== Music video ==
The music video for "Pump It" was filmed in November 2005, in Los Angeles, California, and features The Black Eyed Peas competing and fighting with a gang of unidentified people in a parking garage. The video features a modified Honda Civic Hybrid customized with metallic paint with Black Eyed Peas graphics; the vehicle was later given away in sweepstakes during the 2006 Honda Civic Tour. Some of the vehicle actual driving in the parking lot was CGI, since actually driving in the manner portrayed in the clip was too dangerous and costly for a music video production. Further CGI was required during the soccer ball (clearly visible at 2:07 in the official video) kicking scene in the middle of the video. To enhance the fighting scenes some cord pulling stunts were required.

== Chart performance ==
Before the single was officially released, the song peaked at number 82 on the Billboard Hot 100 in June 2005. This was mainly based on digital download strength due to exposure in the Best Buy ads. After its official airplay release, it peaked at number 18 in March 2006. The single was released to stores in the United States on February 14, 2006, and in the United Kingdom on March 13, 2006.

This single, compared to other Monkey Business singles' performance on US charts, is the lowest ranking single from the album.

The song reached higher spots on charts in other countries. In New Zealand, "Pump It" debuted at number 19 on March 13, 2006. It jumped to number 2 the following week, where it peaked. It became their 4th consecutive top 5 hit from "Monkey Business" in this country, after "Don't Phunk With My Heart" and "My Humps" reached number 1, and "Don't Lie" peaking at number 5. Also, it is their 9th consecutive top 10 hit, after all of their singles from "Elephunk" reached the top 10, (including #1's "Where Is The Love?" and "Shut Up!", and earlier single "Request + Line", which peaked at number 10. Amazingly, this expanded to 11 top 10 hits for the band with the release of the 3 consecutive top 3 singles "Boom Boom Pow" (#2), " I Gotta Feeling" (#1) and "Meet Me Halfway" (#3) from the future album "The E.N.D". The streak broke when next single "Rock That Body" only managed to peak at number 16. They then had another 3 consecutive top 10 hits with "The Time (Dirty Bit)" (another #1 hit in the country), "Just Can't Get Enough" (#4), and "Don't Stop The Party" (#9) from the 2010 album The Beginning. In Australia, the song peaked at number 6. The song was also popular in the United Kingdom, becoming their 8th hit single there. "Pump It" peaked at number 3 on the UK Singles Chart - only 5 sales behind the #2 song that week "It's Chico Time", matching the chart success of previous single "My Humps". It was the first song ever to make the UK Top 40 on sales of downloads alone.

== Official versions ==
- "Pump It" – 3:35
- "Pump It" (Album Version) – 3:33
- "Pump It" (Radio Edit) – 3:35
- "Pump It" (Travis Barker Remix) - 3:36
- "Pump It Harder" – 3:52

== Charts ==
=== Weekly charts ===
Chart (2005–2006)	Peak position
Australia (ARIA)	6
Austria (Ö3 Austria Top 40)	14
Belgium (Ultratop 50 Flanders)	1
Belgium (Ultratop 50 Wallonia)	11
Canada (Nielsen SoundScan)	7
Canada CHR/Pop Top 30 (Radio & Records)	3
CIS Airplay (TopHit) Travis Barker remix	104
Croatia (HRT)	6
Czech Republic Airplay (ČNS IFPI)	2
Denmark Airplay (Tracklisten)	20
European Hot 100 Singles (Billboard)	2
Finland (Suomen virallinen lista)	12
France (SNEP)	13
Germany (GfK)	19
Greece (IFPI)	9
Hungary (Dance Top 40)	2
Hungary (Rádiós Top 40)	7
Ireland (IRMA)	3
Italy (FIMI)	5
Netherlands (Dutch Top 40)	15
Netherlands (Single Top 100)	17
New Zealand (Recorded Music NZ)	2
Russia Airplay (TopHit) Travis Barker remix	96
Scottish Singles Sales (Official Charts)	3
Sweden (Sverigetopplistan)	34
Switzerland (Schweizer Hitparade)	8
UK Singles (Official Charts)	3
Ukraine Airplay (TopHit) Travis Barker remix	152
US Billboard Hot 100	18
US Pop Airplay (Billboard)	11
US Rhythmic Airplay (Billboard)	35

=== Year-end charts ===
Chart (2006)	Position
Australia (ARIA)	31
Austria (Ö3 Austria Top 40)	64
Belgium (Ultratop 50 Flanders)	13
Belgium (Ultratop 50 Wallonia)	39
Brazil (Crowley)	12
European Hot 100 Singles (Billboard)	34
France (SNEP)	72
Hungary (Dance Top 40)	15
Hungary (Rádiós Top 40)	16
Italy (FIMI)	48
Netherlands (Dutch Top 40)	88
New Zealand (Recorded Music NZ)	15
Switzerland (Schweizer Hitparade)	65
UK Singles (OCC)	34
US Billboard Hot 100	89

== Certifications ==
Certifications and sales
Region	Certification	Certified units/sales
Australia (ARIA)	Gold	35,000^{^}
Belgium (BRMA)	Gold	25,000^{*}
Brazil (Pro-Música Brasil)	2× Platinum	120,000^{‡}
Denmark (IFPI Danmark)	Platinum	90,000^{‡}
Germany (BVMI)	Gold	150,000^{‡}
Italy (FIMI)	Platinum	100,000^{‡}
Japan (RIAJ) Ringtone	Gold	100,000^{*}
New Zealand (RMNZ)	3× Platinum	90,000^{‡}
Spain (Promusicae)	Platinum	60,000^{‡}
United Kingdom (BPI)	2× Platinum	1,200,000^{‡}
United States (RIAA)	4× Platinum	4,000,000^{‡}
^{*} Sales figures based on certification alone.^{^} Shipments figures based on certification alone.^{‡} Sales+streaming figures based on certification alone.

== Release history ==
Release dates and formats
Region	Date	Format(s)	Label(s)	Ref.
France	January 16, 2006	CD	Polydor	
United States	January 17, 2006	Rhythmic contemporary radio	A&M; Interscope	
Australia	February 13, 2006	CD	Universal Music	
Germany	March 3, 2006	CD	Universal Music	
France	March 6, 2006	Maxi CD	Polydor	
Germany	March 10, 2006	Maxi CD	Universal Music	
United Kingdom	March 13, 2006	Maxi CD	Polydor	
