= I Need a Freak =

1983 song by Sexual Harassment

"I Need a Freak" is an influential rap/electro song, originally released in 1983 by the musical act Sexual Harassment. It has been recorded and sampled many times, most notably by the hip hop group Black Eyed Peas for their 2005 hit song "My Humps".

The late Lynn Tolliver, who composed the song, was awarded a $1.2 million lawsuit in 2011 against his former collaborator, James McCants, for using the song without permission. Tolliver, a popular, long-time DJ from WZAK in Cleveland, Ohio told the Cleveland Plain Dealer, "I don't get all that money, and I don't have any of it yet, but this couldn't have happened at a better time... I've been unemployed the last few years and was near bankruptcy, so this is a blessing." Tolliver, who was well known in Cleveland for his daring on-air stunts, died in February 2022 due to an undisclosed medical condition. Tolliver is listed under his pseudonym David Payton on the album credits. The song was also released on the 1996 Thump Records compilation album, Old School: Volume 6, as well as the 2000 Priority Records compilation, In tha Beginning...There Was Rap.

A dispute over royalties for the song were heard in an Ohio court in 2014. The Sexual Harassment band consisted of Lynne Poole, Dale Jackson, Lourdes Figueroa, Kelly Albright, Alicia Starr, and Charlie Inez.

== Cover versions ==
Other artists who have covered the song include:

- Egyptian Lover - "I Need a Freak" from Back from the Tomb (1994)
- Esham - "Lowlafalana" from Bruce Wayne: Gothom City 1987 (1997)
- Too $hort - "I Need a Freak" from In tha Beginning...There Was Rap (1997)
- Insane Clown Posse - "Cherry Pie (I Need a Freak)" from Bizzar (2000)
- Electocute - "I Need a Freak" from A Tribute to Your Taste (2003)
- Tyga - "Freak" (2020)
- Lamps - "Freak" (2020)
- The Subs - "Freak" (2023)
- Drag Jazz - "I Need a Freak" (produced by Jonathan Hay and Monyear) from Drag at the Jazz Club (2024)
