= MTV Video Music Award for Ringtone of the Year =

Annual music video award

The MTV Video Music Award for Ringtone of the Year was only given out in 2006. The award was fully fan-voted, just like the other categories at the 2006 VMAs (except for technical categories).

Year	Winner	Other nominees
2006	Fort Minor (featuring Holly Brook) – "Where'd You Go"	The Black Eyed Peas – "My Humps"; Bubba Sparxxx (featuring Ying Yang Twins) – "Ms. New Booty"; Nelly (featuring Paul Wall) – "Grillz"; Kanye West (featuring Jamie Foxx) – "Gold Digger"
