= My Humps =

2005 single by Black Eyed Peas

Single by Black Eyed Peas

from the album Monkey Business
- B-side: "So Real"
- Released: September 20, 2005
- Genre: Hip hop; electropop; dance
- Length: 5:27 (album version); 4:11 (single edit)
- Label: A&M; Interscope; will.i.am
- Songwriters: William Adams; David Payton
- Producer: will.i.am

Black Eyed Peas singles chronology
"Don't Lie" (2005)	"My Humps" (2005)	"Pump It" (2006)

Audio sample
- file; help

Music video
- "My Humps" on YouTube

"My Humps" is a song by American hip hop group the Black Eyed Peas, released on September 20, 2005 by A&M Records and Interscope Records. It was originally written by will.i.am for the American girl group the Pussycat Dolls, but was ultimately recorded for the Black Eyed Peas' fourth studio album, Monkey Business. A hip hop and dance song structured as a duet between will.i.am and Fergie, its lyrics center on Fergie using her breasts and buttocks to accomplish her goals.

The title and lyrics of "My Humps" sparked controversy. Music critics deemed the song a repetitive and puerile form of sexual titillation, though some praised its production. In spite of negative reviews, "My Humps" became the Black Eyed Peas' second single to reach the top three on the US Billboard Hot 100, and sold over two million digital downloads, becoming one of their best-selling singles. It won Best Hip-Hop Video at the 2006 MTV Video Music Awards and Best Pop Performance by a Duo or Group with Vocals at the 2007 Grammy Awards.

"My Humps" has been covered and parodied by several entertainers, including Alanis Morissette and Jack Heath. The song has also appeared in media such as television series and advertisements.

== Recording ==
According to will.i.am, he had originally written the song for the American recording group the Pussycat Dolls, but decided to have them use "Beep" instead, a song that was later released as the third single from their debut studio album PCD (2005). In addition to writing and producing "My Humps", will.i.am also engineered the track with Jason "ill-aroma" Villaroman and performed on all the instruments present on the track. will.i.am and group member Fergie are the main vocalists on the song, while the other two members, Taboo and apl.de.ap, provide background vocals. "My Humps" was recorded at two locations in California: The Stewchia in Los Feliz and Morning View Studios in Malibu. The song was finally mixed by Romanian mix engineer Șerban Ghenea. The song samples lines from Sexual Harassment's 1983 single, "I Need a Freak". In June 2011, American disc jockey Lynn Tolliver, the writer of "I Need a Freak", won a lawsuit that claimed publisher and producer James McCant committed copyright infringement and licensed the song to the group without his permission. Tolliver said the song was licensed under his name and that in 1983 McCant had agreed to pay him 75 percent of any royalties from the song. Tolliver won $1.2 million as a result. The song was back in court in 2014 over royalty issues.

== Composition ==
"My Humps" is a hip hop and dance track that is backed by an electro-influenced drum beat. It incorporates a compositional sample of "I Need a Freak", written by Lynn Tolliver (a.k.a. David Payton). Talia Kraines of BBC Music commented that Fergie and will.i.am "sing playfully at each other, easily creating a vision of a boy/girl break-danceoff." Kraines also noted that the song sounded like a mix between Paula Abdul's "Opposites Attract" (Forever Your Girl, 1988) and Neneh Cherry's "Buffalo Stance" (Raw Like Sushi, 1989). Steve "Flash" Juon of RapReviews said that Fergie's rap verse was "Khia-esque". Azeem Ahmad of musicOMH noted that the song sounded similar to Gwen Stefani's "Hollaback Girl" (Love. Angel. Music. Baby., 2004).

== Release ==
"My Humps" was released as the third single from Monkey Business (2005), after "Don't Phunk with My Heart" and "Don't Lie". After gaining considerable airplay and strong digital downloads, Interscope Records decided to release it while "Don't Lie" was still rising up the charts. It was released as the album's third single in the United States on September 20, 2005. On November 4, 2005, a remix of the song by American rapper Lil Jon was released to digital retailers through Interscope Records. Interscope also released the single internationally on November 7, 2005, featuring the Lil Jon remix as a B-side. On November 11, 2005, an extended play was released internationally. It features the song "So Real" and the Lil Jon remix. On November 18, 2005, the song was released internationally as a CD single and maxi single.

== Music video ==
The official music video for "My Humps", directed by Fatima Robinson and Malik Hassan Sayeed, premiered on TRL. It shows Fergie dancing with backup dancers in a dance class room as images of expensive items such as Louis Vuitton purses and jewelry, which is supposed to be the jewelry her men have bought her, appear on the screen. The other members of Black Eyed Peas—apl.de.ap, Taboo, and will.i.am—sing about how much they spend on Fergie as she sings about her feminine attributes.

== Reception ==
Talia Kraines of BBC Music commended "My Humps" as the most immediate track on the album, while noting that it could sound perfect on a Gwen Stefani album. Steve "Flash" Juon of RapReviews expressed a different feeling towards the song, calling Fergie's rap a "poor man's version of "My Neck, My Back" and will.i.am.'s verses "retarded". Azeem Ahmad of musicOMH, in his review of Monkey Business, expressed mixed feelings toward "My Humps", writing that it is "uneasy but it does seem to fit Fergie's persona while will.i.am's vocals suit him down to the ground." In the review of the single on the same publication, Mark Fielding dismissed the sexual and materialistic lyrics, criticizing the rhyming of drunk with hump(s), lump(s), and bump(s). He described the mentions of "Coco Pops" and "milk" as ludicrous yet laughable, and praised the song's production.

Kelefa Sanneh of The New York Times commented that the single is going "most likely to live in infamy." Bill Lamb of About.com gave the song a two and a half star rating, giving credit to its catchy appeal, but was ultimately dismissed for its "junior high level sexual titillation", "boring minimalist repetition", and "serious lack of true wit and humor." Lamb's review was notably influenced by the success of the previous album, Elephunk (2003), indicated by this comment "In light of the band's previous triumphs as an inventive, socially conscious hip hop group, Black Eyed Peas releasing a song that trades on obsessions with female breasts simply to have a hit song is rather depressing." He also compared the song to Ciara's "Goodies" and Kelis's "Milkshake", commending the aforementioned single for presenting "greater wit and self awareness" than "My Humps". Jason King of The Village Voice called "My Humps" "asinine" and commented, "[it] conjures up none of the erotic discomfiture that gave "Milkshake" and "Cameltoe" their bite." Rolling Stone called it "an irresistible, butt-stupid ode to Fergie's ass."

"My Humps" is regarded by multiple critics as the single worst song ever written. Despite this, it won the "Best Hip-Hop Video" at the 2006 MTV Video Music Awards, and Best Pop Performance by a Duo or Group with Vocals at the 2007 Grammy Awards. Rolling Stone readers voted the track number one in the "20 Most Annoying Songs" list. Ryan Schreiber of Pitchfork Media listed "My Humps" at number three on "The 15 Worst Releases of 2005" list, writing "Like 'Who Let the Dogs Out' before it, 'My Humps' is so monumentally vacuous, slapped together and tossed-off that it truly tests the definition of 'song';" and described it as a "five-minute commercial jingle." In his 2009 book Crap Lyrics, music journalist Johnny Sharp lists "My Humps" as "the worst song lyrics in the world", describing them as "objectification of the female form to sewer-like depths".

== Commercial performance ==
"My Humps" proved to be the most commercially successful single from Monkey Business (2005). Before its release as a single, "My Humps" was already charting while the previous single "Don't Lie" was still gaining traction. The song entered the Billboard Hot 100 on August 20, 2005, at number eighty-five and moved up to number fifty-nine in the following week, making the second largest leap on the chart for that week. It continue rising up the chart, and by the time the song was officially released as a single, it entered the top ten. On November 5, 2005, "My Humps" reached number three on the Hot 100, where it lasted for six weeks. It lasted more than nine months on the Billboard Hot 100, sixteen weeks of which were spent inside the top ten. Throughout 2005, it sold 917,807 digital copies in the US. Since the single's release, the song has sold 2,203,000 downloads and has earned a double platinum certification by the Recording Industry Association of America (RIAA) for mastertone sales.

"My Humps" was commercially successful in the Australasia territories. On November 21, 2005, the song debuted and peaked at number one on the Australian Singles Chart. It lasted two weeks at the top position and a total of seventeen weeks on the chart. The song shipped 70,000 copies in Australia, earning a platinum certification by Australian Recording Industry Association (ARIA). This success was replicated in New Zealand, when it debuted on the New Zealand Top 40 at number one on November 28, 2005. It fell off the top position in the following week and reappeared at number one six weeks later.

"My Humps" proved to be a success in Europe, peaking inside the top ten in eleven countries and in the top twenty in two others, while also peaking at number two on the European Hot 100. The song experienced its greatest performance in the British Isles. In the United Kingdom, the song debuted and peaked at number three, becoming the week's "highest debut". It stalled at the position the next week until falling to number five in the following week. "My Humps" eventually sold 295,000 copies in the country, according to The Official Charts Company. The song entered the Irish Singles Chart at number three on November 17, 2005. It stalled for two more weeks at that position until rising to number one in the following week. The song spent a total of nineteen weeks on the chart.

== Covers and parodies ==
"My Humps" has been covered and parodied by several amateur and established acts. Australian novelist Jack Heath cited the song and its "objectification of women disguised as empowerment" as his primary inspiration for his 2005 style parody "Don't Stall". Electronic musician Peaches covered the song in 2006, altering the lyrics humorously and changing the title to "My Dumps". Canadian rock singer Alanis Morissette covered the song in 2007, seemingly as an April Fools' Day prank. In contrast to the original "My Humps", Morissette's cover is performed slowly and in the style of a ballad, with only a piano accompanying the vocal. On April 2, a video in which Morissette parodies Fergie's dancing moves in the original "My Humps" music video was added to the website YouTube. By April 3, the video was the most viewed on Technorati, and it was viewed 1.5 million times six days later. The video has been hosted on Morissette's official website. TIME stated that the parody proved that Morissette understands irony, in reference to her hit single, "Ironic". On April 15, Fergie confirmed to E! News that she thought that the parody was hilarious and genius. Fergie sent Alanis a cake in the shape of buttocks.

Greeting card company American Greetings parodied the song in their Christmas e-card, "Three Wise Camels", in which the camels of the Three Wise Men rap about the gifts awaiting baby Jesus, which are sitting on their humps.

== Track listings ==
Two-track CD single

1. "My Humps" – 4:10
2. "My Humps" (Lil Jon remix) – 3:45

International EP

1. "My Humps" (single version) – 4:10
2. "My Humps" (Lil Jon remix) – 3:44
3. "So Real" (non-LP version) – 2:25

Maxi single

1. "My Humps" (single version) – 4:13
2. "My Humps" (Lil Jon remix) – 3:46
3. "So Real" (non-LP version) – 2:25
4. "My Humps" (video)

Lil Jon remix

1. "My Humps" (Lil Jon remix) – 3:44

== Personnel ==
Recording

- Recorded at the Stewchia in Los Feliz, California and Morning View Studios in Malibu, California.
- Contains elements of "I Need a Freak", written by David Payton (the pseudonym of Lynn Tolliver) under Sugar Hill Music Publishing (BMI).

Personnel

- Songwriting – William Adams, David Payton
- Production, programming, synthesizers, bass guitar – will.i.am
- Engineering – will.i.am, Jason "ill-aroma" Villaroman
- Mixing – Serban Ghenea
- Vocals – Fergie, will.i.am

== Charts ==
=== Weekly charts ===
Chart (2005–2006)	Peak position
Australia (ARIA)	1
Australian Urban (ARIA)	1
Austria (Ö3 Austria Top 40)	4
Belgium (Ultratop 50 Flanders)	3
Belgium (Ultratop 50 Wallonia)	5
Canada CHR/Pop Top 30 (Radio & Records)	1
CIS Airplay (TopHit)	36
Czech Republic Airplay (ČNS IFPI)	7
Denmark (Tracklisten)	5
Europe (Eurochart Hot 100)	2
Finland (Suomen virallinen lista)	7
France (SNEP)	11
Germany (GfK)	4
Greece (IFPI)	10
Hungary (Dance Top 40)	8
Hungary (Rádiós Top 40)	19
Ireland (IRMA)	1
Italy (FIMI)	9
Netherlands (Dutch Top 40)	4
Netherlands (Single Top 100)	5
New Zealand (Recorded Music NZ)	1
Norway (VG-lista)	4
Peru (Notimex)	3
Romania (Romanian Top 100)	7
Russia Airplay (TopHit)	35
Scottish Singles Sales (Official Charts)	5
Sweden (Sverigetopplistan)	19
Switzerland (Schweizer Hitparade)	3
UK Singles (Official Charts)	3
UK Hip Hop/R&B (Official Charts)	1
US Billboard Hot 100	3
US Hot R&B/Hip-Hop Songs (Billboard)	57
US Hot Rap Songs (Billboard)	10
US Pop Airplay (Billboard)	4
US Rhythmic Airplay (Billboard)	4

Chart (2016)	Peak position
Ukraine Airplay (TopHit)	42

=== Year-end charts ===
Chart (2005)	Position
Australia (ARIA)	44
Belgium (Ultratop 50 Flanders)	94
Ireland (IRMA)	14
Netherlands (Dutch Top 40)	71
Netherlands (Single Top 100)	55
New Zealand (Recorded Music NZ)	38
UK Singles (OCC)	32
US Billboard Hot 100	32
US Mainstream Top 40 (Billboard)	48
US Rhythmic Top 40 (Billboard)	29

Chart (2006)	Position
Australia (ARIA)	36
Austria (Ö3 Austria Top 40)	31
Belgium (Ultratop 50 Flanders)	39
Belgium (Ultratop 50 Wallonia)	64
Brazil Pop Charts (Crowley)	7
CIS Airplay (TopHit)	108
Europe (Eurochart Hot 100)	11
Germany (Media Control GfK)	30
Hungary (Dance Top 40)	64
Russia Airplay (TopHit)	104
Switzerland (Schweizer Hitparade)	29
UK Singles (OCC)	75
US Billboard Hot 100	42

=== Decade-end charts ===
Chart (2000–2009)	Position
US Billboard Hot 100	84

== Certifications ==
Certifications and sales
Region	Certification	Certified units/sales
Australia (ARIA)	Platinum	70,000^{^}
Brazil (Pro-Música Brasil)	Platinum	60,000^{*}
Denmark (IFPI Danmark)	Platinum	8,000^{^}
Germany (BVMI)	Gold	150,000^{‡}
New Zealand (RMNZ)	2× Platinum	60,000^{‡}
Sweden (GLF)	Gold	10,000^{^}
United Kingdom (BPI)	Platinum	600,000^{‡}
United States (RIAA)	5× Platinum	5,000,000^{‡}
United States (RIAA) Mastertone	2× Platinum	2,000,000^{*}
^{*} Sales figures based on certification alone.^{^} Shipments figures based on certification alone.^{‡} Sales+streaming figures based on certification alone.

== Release history ==
Release dates and formats
Region	Date	Version(s)	Format(s)	Label(s)	Ref.
United States	September 20, 2005	Original; remix	Digital download (EP)	A&M; Interscope	
United States	September 27, 2005	Remix	12-inch vinyl	A&M; Interscope	
Australia	November 14, 2005	Original; remix	Maxi CD	Universal Music	
United Kingdom	November 14, 2005	Original; remix	Maxi CD	Polydor	
Germany	November 18, 2005	Original; remix	CD; maxi CD	Universal Music	
United States	November 22, 2005	Original	12-inch vinyl	A&M; Interscope	
France	May 15, 2006	Original; remix	CD	Polydor	
Various	October 15, 2021	JBroadway Remix	Digital download; streaming	Interscope	
