= Don't Phunk with My Heart =

2005 single by The Black Eyed Peas

Single by the Black Eyed Peas

from the album Monkey Business
- B-side: "Bend Your Back"
- Released: April 5, 2005
- Studio: Metropolis (London, England); Record Plant (Los Angeles)
- Genre: Hip hop
- Length: 4:04
- Label: A&M; Interscope; will.i.am
- Songwriters: William Adams; Stacy Ferguson; Printz Board; George Pajon, Jr.; Full Force; Kalyanji–Anandji; Indeewar
- Producer: will.i.am

The Black Eyed Peas singles chronology
"Let's Get It Started" (2004)	"Don't Phunk with My Heart" (2005)	"Don't Lie" (2005)

Audio sample
- 30 second sample of "Don't Phunk with My Heart": file; help

Music video
- "Don't Phunk with My Heart" on YouTube

"Don't Phunk with My Heart" (censored as "Don't Mess with My Heart") is a song recorded by American group the Black Eyed Peas for their fourth studio album, Monkey Business (2005). It was written by band members will.i.am and Fergie with Printz Board, George Pajon, Jr. and Full Force; will.i.am also produced and engineered the song. The song is a hip hop song in which the lyrics, according to will.i.am, tell of a situation between a couple when one tries to end the relationship and the other is in disbelief. It features compositional samples of songs derived from two Bollywood films of the 1970s, Apradh (1972) and Don (1978), as well as interpolations of Lisa Lisa and Cult Jam with Full Force's 1985 single "I Wonder If I Take You Home" and Gucci Crew II's 1988 single "Sally (That Girl)", hence earning Kalyanji–Anandji, Indeewar and Full Force songwriting credits. The song was released as the lead single from Monkey Business on April 5, 2005, by A&M Records and Interscope Records.

"Don't Phunk with My Heart" was received positively by most contemporary music critics, with many of them naming it one of the album's highlights. It was also met with a positive commercial response, peaking at number three on the US Billboard Hot 100–becoming the group's highest-peaking single on the chart at the time–and at number one in Australia, the Czech Republic, Finland, and New Zealand. At the 48th Annual Grammy Awards (2006), it won Best Rap Performance by a Duo or Group, while receiving a nomination for Best Rap Song. The song's accompanying music video is a parody of game shows, most notably The Price Is Right, The Dating Game, and Love Connection.

== Background ==
"Don't Phunk with My Heart" is one of two songs on Monkey Business that was written by will.i.am and Fergie of the Black Eyed Peas. Additional writers include George Pajon, Jr. and Printz Board.

"Ae Naujawan Hai Sab Kuchh Yahan"
Asha Bhosle's "Ae Naujawan Hai Sab Kuch Yahan" from Apradh (1972) was sampled in the song "Don't Phunk with My Heart"

The song contains samples of several songs: Lisa Lisa and Cult Jam with Full Force's "I Wonder If I Take You Home", written and composed by Full Force, and "Ae Naujawan Sab Kuchh Yahan" and "Yeh Mera Dil Pyaar Ka Diwana", both recorded by Asha Bhosle, composed by Kalyanji–Anandji, and with lyrics written by Indeewar. The former of the latter two was featured in the Hindi film Apradh (1972) while the latter was featured in the Hindi film Don (1978).

Black Eyed Peas member will.i.am, in addition to co-writing the song, produced the track on his own while working with Neil Tucker and Tal Herzberg on engineering it. Co-writer Pajon, Jr. contributed guitars while Keith Harris played the drums. "Don't Phunk with My Heart" features a prominent use of several string instruments, which include the electric violin and Mellotron strings, played by Charlie Baccarat and song co-writer Board. It was then mixed by Mark "Spike" Stent and programmed by Herzberg using Pro Tools technology. The song was recorded at Metropolis Studios in Chiswick, London, England and the Record Plant in Los Angeles, California. "Don't Phunk with My Heart" serves as the first single taken from Monkey Business (2005). Interscope Records solicited the song to mainstream radios on April 11, 2005, in the United States.

== Composition ==
"Don't Phunk with My Heart" is a hip-hop song that runs for 4 minutes and 4 seconds. According to the digital music sheet published at Musicnotes.com by Universal Music Publishing Group, it is written in a key of F minor. The song is set in common time and runs through a freely moving tempo of 132 beats per minute. will.i.am described the song to be the lyrical sequel to the band's 2003 single "Shut Up" (Elephunk, 2003). He explained: "When you're on bad terms with a significant other, you don't want to break up. You tell her things and at the time you really mean them. But she's saying, stop f****ing [sic] with me." Jason King of The Village Voice called the song a "sassy gender duel" between will.i.am and Fergie, while commenting that it is reminiscent of "Shut Up".

== Critical reception ==
Nicholas Taylor of PopMatters called "Don't Phunk with My Heart" a "standout" in regard to "complex and engaging hip-hop music, a mix of rap, soul, jazz, and funk that will constantly surprise and delight." However, he stated that "Pump It" would have been a better choice for Monkey Business' first single, writing that it "continually impresses and grooves and better melds raps with beats", while noting "Don't Phunk with My Heart" to get repetitive and clunky. Taylor further explains the song's cons, writing that it suffers from "unimpressive rapping" and "a distinct lack of substance". John Bush of AllMusic listed it as one of Monkey Business' best tracks. Nathan Rabin of The A.V. Club calls it a continuation of the "summertime vibe of dumb fun". Robert Christgau listed the song as a track pick. Azeem Ahmad of musicOMH predicted the album Monkey Business to be a success if "Don't Phunk with My Heart" was an indication of its sound. The staff at Boston.com felt the song was "OK" compared to "My Style", a different album track. Kelefa Sanneh of The New York Times called it "a much more wholesome hip-hop hit", comparing it to Ying Yang Twins' 2005 single "Wait (The Whisper Song)".

The Black Eyed Peas were nominated for two awards at the 48th Annual Grammy Awards in 2006 for the song and won for Grammy Award for Best Rap Performance by a Duo or Group. The song also won the BMI Award, which was awarded to Kalyanji Virji Shah and his brother Anandji Virji Shah, for their compositions of "Ye Mera Dil" and "Ae Nujawan" used as a basis for the song. The award was collected by Anandji Virji Shah, the surviving member of the duo.

== Chart performance ==
In the United States, "Don't Phunk with My Heart" entered the Billboard Hot 100 at number 97 following its release. The song then jumped sixty-six places to number 31 in the following week due to digital sales. It continued to rise up the chart until June 25, 2005, when it peaked at number three due to an increase in digital sales, becoming the week's "greatest digital gainer". "Don't Phunk with My Heart" also reached the top 10 on the Billboard Mainstream Top 40. The song sold over 500,000 digital copies in the United States, earning a gold certification by the Recording Industry Association of America (RIAA). Throughout 2005, it sold 815,753 digital copies.

In the United Kingdom, "Don't Phunk with My Heart" entered and debuted at number three on the UK Singles Chart on May 22, 2005 (for the week ending May 28, 2005). It lasted four weeks inside the top 10 and 16 weeks total on the chart. According to the British Phonographic Industry (BPI), the song has sold and streamed 400,000 units in the UK, qualifying it for a gold certification. The song fared similarly in Ireland, where it debuted and peaked at number four on the singles chart. On May 23, 2005, "Don't Phunk with My Heart" debuted and peaked at number one on the Australian Singles Chart. It lost the position the following week but retook the position on June 12 and maintained the top spot for two more weeks. The song has shipped over 70,000 copies in Australia, earning a platinum certification by the Australian Recording Industry Association (ARIA). In New Zealand, the song entered the singles chart at number 36 on May 16, 2005. The following week, it rose to number one, where it stayed for three consecutive weeks. The song shipped 15,000 copies in New Zealand, earning a platinum certification by the Recording Industry Association of New Zealand (RIANZ).

"Don't Phunk with My Heart" appeared on the Norwegian Singles Chart on May 24, 2005, at number five. It maintained that position for three weeks before rising to number four on June 14, 2005, where it continued to stay for three more weeks. The song remained on the chart for six more weeks and shipped over 5,000 copies, earning a gold certification by IFPI Norway. Across the rest of Europe, "Don't Phunk with My Heart" achieved top-five positions in Austria, Denmark, Finland, Flanders, Italy, the Netherlands, Spain, and Switzerland and reached the top 10 in France, Germany, Sweden, and Wallonia.

== Music video ==
The video for the song is a parody of game shows, most notably The Price Is Right, The Dating Game, and Love Connection. will.i.am, apl.de.ap and Taboo attempt to win the heart of Fergie, a beautiful girl, by being chosen to go on a date with her by spinning a wheel to decide where they will go, then being teleported to the site. will.i.am takes Fergie on a horse-ride, apl takes her dancing and Taboo takes her to a restaurant, but each date ends badly with Voodoo Thursday sabotaging the boys' attempts. He makes will.i.am's horse buck him off, he makes apl twitch when Fergie tries to kiss him, and he programs Taboo to grab another girl's butt. In the end, Fergie has to choose whom to end up with. Voodoo then spins the wheel, it comes up "knock boots". When the time comes for Fergie to choose, Voodoo whispers something to Fergie, and they are teleported away as the "heart"-shaped irises out. The members of The Black Eyed Peas all appear in the video, some in multiple roles. will.i.am plays himself, the host Voodoo Thursday, and the drummer in the live band. apl plays himself, the guitarist, and the announcer, Fergie plays herself and Taboo plays himself and the pianist/keyboardist in the live band.

A brief instrumental clip of the song can be heard on various episodes of The Hills as their cue for possible drama coming up.

== Track listings ==
UK CD single

No.	Title	Length
1.	"Don't Mess with My Heart"
2.	"Bend Your Back"

European CD single

No.	Title	Length
1.	"Don't Phunk with My Heart"	4:05
2.	"Don't Phunk with My Heart" (Chicago House Remix)	3:48

European maxi-CD single

No.	Title	Length
1.	"Don't Phunk with My Heart"	4:05
2.	"Don't Phunk with My Heart" (Chicago House Remix)	3:48
3.	"Bend Your Back"	3:43
4.	"Don't Phunk with My Heart" (video)	3:45

== Credits and personnel ==
Credits are adapted from the liner notes of Monkey Business, A&M Records, will.i.am Music Group, Interscope Records.

Recording and sample

- Recorded at Metropolis Studios in Chiswick, London, England and The Record Plant in Los Angeles, California
- Contains elements of "I Wonder If I Take You Home", written by Full Force under Careers-BMG Music (BMI)
- Contains elements of "Ae Naujawan Sab Kuchh Yahan", written by Kalyanji Anandji and Indeewar under Saregma India Ltd. (IRPS)
- Contains elements of "Yeh Mera Dil Yaar Ka Diwana", written by Kalyanji Anandji and Indeewar under Saregma India Ltd. (IRPS)

Personnel

- Songwriting – William Adams, Stacy Ferguson, Printz Board, George Pajon, Jr., Full Force, Kalyanji–Anandji, Indeewar
- Vocals – will.i.am, Fergie and Taboo
- Production – will.i.am
- Drums – Keith Harris
- Guitar – George Pajon, Jr.
- Keyboards – Printz Board
- String arrangement – Ron Fair
- Electric violin – Charlie Baccarat
- Pro Tools programming – Tal Herzberg
- Engineering – will.i.am, Neil Tucker, Tal Herzberg
- Mixing – Mark "Spike" Stent

== Charts ==
=== Weekly charts ===
Chart (2005)	Peak position
Australia (ARIA)	1
Australian Urban (ARIA)	1
Austria (Ö3 Austria Top 40)	5
Belgium (Ultratop 50 Flanders)	4
Belgium (Ultratop 50 Wallonia)	8
Canada CHR/Pop Top 30 (Radio & Records)	1
Canada Hot AC Top 30 (Radio & Records)	13
CIS Airplay (TopHit)	9
Czech Republic (IFPI)	1
Denmark (Tracklisten)	2
Europe (Eurochart Hot 100)	2
Finland (Suomen virallinen lista)	1
France (SNEP)	7
Germany (GfK)	8
Greece (IFPI)	4
Hungary (Rádiós Top 40)	7
Ireland (IRMA)	4
Italy (FIMI)	4
Netherlands (Dutch Top 40)	2
Netherlands (Single Top 100)	2
New Zealand (Recorded Music NZ)	1
Norway (VG-lista)	4
Russia Airplay (TopHit)	9
Scottish Singles Sales (Official Charts)	3
Spain (Promusicae)	2
Sweden (Sverigetopplistan)	6
Switzerland (Schweizer Hitparade)	3
UK Singles (Official Charts)	3
UK Hip Hop/R&B (Official Charts)	2
Ukraine Airplay (TopHit)	52
US Billboard Hot 100	3
US Adult Pop Airplay (Billboard)	30
US Dance Airplay (Billboard)	4
US Hot Rap Songs (Billboard)	22
US Pop Airplay (Billboard)	3
US Rhythmic Airplay (Billboard)	18

=== Year-end charts ===
Chart (2005)	Position
Australia (ARIA)	10
Australian Urban (ARIA)	7
Austria (Ö3 Austria Top 40)	49
Belgium (Ultratop 50 Flanders)	36
Belgium (Ultratop 50 Wallonia)	63
Brazil (Crowley)	28
CIS Airplay (TopHit)	35
Europe (Eurochart Hot 100)	29
France (SNEP)	51
Germany (Media Control GfK)	79
Hungary (Rádiós Top 40)	23
Italy (FIMI)	26
Netherlands (Dutch Top 40)	16
Netherlands (Single Top 100)	51
New Zealand (RIANZ)	7
Romania (Romanian Top 100)	28
Russia Airplay (TopHit)	31
Sweden (Hitlistan)	25
Switzerland (Schweizer Hitparade)	40
UK Singles (OCC)	25
Ukraine Airplay (TopHit)	199
US Billboard Hot 100	13
US Adult Top 40 (Billboard)	93
US Hot Dance Airplay (Billboard)	29
US Mainstream Top 40 (Billboard)	9
US Rhythmic Top 40 (Billboard)	81
Venezuela (Record Report)	7

== Certifications ==
Region	Certification	Certified units/sales
Australia (ARIA)	Platinum	70,000^{^}
Denmark (IFPI Danmark)	Gold	4,000^{^}
Italy	—	10,000
New Zealand (RMNZ)	Platinum	10,000^{*}
Norway (IFPI Norway)	Gold	5,000^{*}
Sweden (GLF)	Gold	10,000^{^}
United Kingdom (BPI)	Gold	400,000^{‡}
United States (RIAA)	2× Platinum	2,000,000^{‡}
^{*} Sales figures based on certification alone.^{^} Shipments figures based on certification alone.^{‡} Sales+streaming figures based on certification alone.

== Release history ==
Release dates and formats
Region	Date	Format(s)	Label(s)	Ref.
United States	April 5, 2005	Digital download	A&M; Interscope	
United States	April 11, 2005	Contemporary hit radio	A&M; Interscope	
United States	May 10, 2005	12-inch vinyl	A&M; Interscope	
Australia	May 16, 2005	CD	Universal Music	
France	May 16, 2005	Maxi CD	Polydor	
United Kingdom	May 16, 2005	CD; maxi CD	Polydor	
Germany	May 17, 2005	Maxi CD	Universal Music	
France	May 18, 2005	CD	Polydor	
Japan	May 27, 2005	CD	Universal Music	

== Cover versions ==
Russian metalcore band Amatory released a cover version of the song, as "Don't Fuck with My Heart". It appears on their 2006 covers EP Discovery.
