= 2006 MTV Video Music Awards =

Award ceremony

- Date: Thursday, August 31, 2006
- Location: Radio City Music Hall, New York, New York
- Country: United States
- Hosted by: Jack Black

Highlights
- Most awards: James Blunt and Gnarls Barkley (2 each)
- Most nominations: Shakira and Red Hot Chili Peppers (7 each)
- Website: http://www.mtv.com/ontv/vma/past-vmas/2006/

Television/radio coverage
- Network: MTV; MTV2; MHD
- Viewership: 5.77 million
- Produced by: Done and Dusted; Salli Frattini; Dave Sirulnick
- Directed by: Hamish Hamilton

The 2006 MTV Video Music Awards aired live on August 31, 2006, honoring the best music videos from June 11, 2005, to June 26, 2006. The show was hosted by Jack Black at Radio City Music Hall in New York City.

The 2006 Video Music Awards marked the first time viewers were able to vote for all performers' categories (Best Video; Best Male, Female, and Group Videos; and genre categories). Like previous years, the artistic categories (Best Direction, Best Cinematography, etc.) are still chosen by music industry professionals. The 2006 Awards also discontinued the major category Breakthrough Video.

The show was criticized by fans and viewers as being uninteresting or lacking substance. The award ceremony's ratings were down 28% from the 8 million viewers it averaged in 2005 and down 45% from the 10.3 million viewers it averaged in 2004.

Shakira and Red Hot Chili Peppers received the most nominations, with seven each. Followed by Madonna and Panic! at the Disco with 5 nominations. Avenged Sevenfold won Best New Artist and "I Write Sins Not Tragedies", by Panic! at the Disco, became the first video to win Video of the Year without winning a single other award since "This Note's for You" by Neil Young in 1989.

== Background ==
MTV announced on March 21 that the 2006 Video Music Awards would be held on August 31 at New York City's Radio City Music Hall, returning to the city after two consecutive ceremonies in Miami. Nominees were announced at a press conference held at Top of the Rock and hosted by Mayor of New York City Michael Bloomberg, Beyoncé, and Justin Timberlake on July 31. Jack Black was announced as host on August 10. The ceremony broadcast was preceded by Red Carpet on the Rock. Hosted by Kurt Loder and SuChin Pak with reports from John Norris, Sway, and Gideon Yago, the pre-show featured red carpet interviews and performances from Fergie and My Chemical Romance. It also marked Loder’s final hosting appearance at a VMA pre-show, having hosted each broadcast since 1990. The ceremony marked MTV's first attempt at integrating multi-platform content into the broadcast. Expanding the previous year’s use of MTV Overdrive for bonus material, MTV Overdrive simultaneously aired a VMA Live: Backstage Uncensored channel, providing live footage of presenters and performers in the backstage areas, which was heavily promoted during the linear broadcast. For the first time, the live broadcast expanded beyond MTV to include a live simulcast on MTV2 with commentary from the MTV2 VJs and the first high-definition simulcast on MHD.

== Performances ==
Artist(s)	Song(s)
Pre-show
Fergie	"London Bridge"
My Chemical Romance	"Welcome to the Black Parade"
Main show
Justin Timberlake	"My Love" "SexyBack" (featuring Timbaland)
Shakira; Wyclef Jean	"Hips Don't Lie"
Ludacris; Pharrell; Pussycat Dolls	"Money Maker"
OK Go	"Here It Goes Again"
The All-American Rejects	"Move Along"
Beyoncé	"Ring the Alarm"
T.I. Young Dro; DJ Drama	"Shoulder Lean" "What You Know"
Panic! at the Disco	"I Write Sins Not Tragedies"
Busta Rhymes; Missy Elliott	Michael Jackson Video Vanguard Medley "Put Your Hands Where My Eyes Could See" "The Rain (Supa Dupa Fly)"
Christina Aguilera	"Hurt"
Tenacious D	"Friendship Song"
The Killers	"Enterlude" "When You Were Young"

In addition, The Raconteurs served as the house band, being joined by Lou Reed and Billy Gibbons on select songs.

== Appearances ==
=== Pre-show ===
- The Black Eyed Peas – introduced Fergie's performance

=== Main show ===
- Jay-Z – opened the show
- Montel Williams, Justin Timberlake and Michael Bloomberg – made brief appearances during Jack Black's opening sequence
- Lil' Kim – presented Best Male Video
- André 3000 and Ciara – presented Best Hip-Hop Video
- The Rock – introduced Shakira and Wyclef Jean
- The cast of Jackass Number Two (Johnny Knoxville, Bam Margera, Steve-O, Chris Pontius, Ryan Dunn, Wee Man, Dave England, Preston Lacy, and Ehren McGhehey) – appeared in different vignettes about Viewer's Choice voting, and later on presented Viewer's Choice
- 50 Cent and LL Cool J – presented Best Female Video
- Lil Jon (with E-40) – introduced Pharrell and Ludacris
- Sarah Silverman – appeared in backstage skits and coverage, and later performed a stand-up routine
- Kyle Gass – appeared in a couple of on-stage sequences with Jack Black and The Black Eyed Peas
- Jessica Simpson – presented Best Dance Video
- Chris Brown – introduced OK Go
- Shaun White – introduced as of the Jackass Number Two cast's vignettes
- Paris Hilton – introduced The All-American Rejects
- Nick Lachey and Nicole Richie – presented Best Pop Video
- Snoop Dogg – presented Best Rap Video
- Diddy – introduced T.I.
- Amy Lee (of Evanescence) and Jared Leto (of Thirty Seconds to Mars) – presented Best Group Video
- Ne-Yo and Rihanna – presented Ringtone of the Year
- Fall Out Boy – introduced Panic! at the Disco
- Fergie – introduced Abigail Breslin and presented Best New Artist in a Video with her
- Jim Shearer and EBRO – presented the MTV2 Award (only seen on the MTV2 simulcast of the ceremony)
- Britney Spears and Kevin Federline (via pretaped segment) – presented Best R&B Video
- Kanye West – presented the Video Vanguard Award
- Pink and Lou Reed – presented Best Rock Video
- The Black Eyed Peas – appeared in an on-stage sequence with Kyle Gass (presenting a fake award), which led to Tenacious D's "reunion" and performance
- Queen Latifah – introduced Al Gore
- Al Gore – spoke about global warming and the world's environmental crisis
- Jennifer Lopez – announced the launch of MTV Tr3́s and presented Video of the Year
- Axl Rose – introduced The Killers
- Also, MTV's Vanessa Minnillo and John Norris appeared before and after some commercial breaks to remind viewers to check out MTV Overdrive's backstage VMA coverage

== Winners and nominees ==
Winners are in bold text.

Video of the Year	Best Male Video
**Panic! at the Disco – "I Write Sins Not Tragedies"**; Christina Aguilera – "Ain't No Other Man"; Madonna – "Hung Up"; Red Hot Chili Peppers – "Dani California"; Shakira (featuring Wyclef Jean) – "Hips Don't Lie"	**James Blunt – "You're Beautiful"**; Busta Rhymes (featuring Mary J. Blige, Rah Digga, Missy Elliott, Lloyd Banks, Papoose, and DMX) – "Touch It Remix"; Nick Lachey – "What's Left of Me"; T.I. – "What You Know"; Kanye West (featuring Jamie Foxx) – "Gold Digger"
Best Female Video	Best Group Video
**Kelly Clarkson – "Because of You"**; Christina Aguilera – "Ain't No Other Man"; Nelly Furtado (featuring Timbaland) – "Promiscuous"; Madonna – "Hung Up"; Shakira (featuring Wyclef Jean) – "Hips Don't Lie"	**The All-American Rejects – "Move Along"**; Fall Out Boy – "Dance, Dance"; Gnarls Barkley – "Crazy"; Panic! at the Disco – "I Write Sins Not Tragedies"; Red Hot Chili Peppers – "Dani California"
Best New Artist in a Video	Best Pop Video
**Avenged Sevenfold – "Bat Country"**; Angels & Airwaves – "The Adventure"; James Blunt – "You're Beautiful"; Chris Brown (featuring Juelz Santana) – "Run It!"; Panic! at the Disco – "I Write Sins Not Tragedies"; Rihanna – "SOS"	**P!nk – "Stupid Girls"**; Christina Aguilera – "Ain't No Other Man; Nelly Furtado (featuring Timbaland) – "Promiscuous"; Madonna – "Hung Up"; Shakira (featuring Wyclef Jean) – "Hips Don't Lie"
Best Rock Video	Best R&B Video
**AFI – "Miss Murder"**; Green Day – "Wake Me Up When September Ends"; Panic! at the Disco – "I Write Sins Not Tragedies"; Red Hot Chili Peppers – "Dani California"; Thirty Seconds to Mars – "The Kill"	**Beyoncé (featuring Slim Thug and Bun B) – "Check on It"**; Mary J. Blige – "Be Without You"; Chris Brown – "Yo (Excuse Me Miss)"; Mariah Carey – "Shake It Off"; Jamie Foxx (featuring Ludacris) – "Unpredictable"
Best Rap Video	Best Hip-Hop Video
**Chamillionaire (featuring Krayzie Bone) – "Ridin'"**; 50 Cent – "Window Shopper"; Busta Rhymes (featuring Mary J. Blige, Rah Digga, Missy Elliott, Lloyd Banks, Papoose, and DMX) – "Touch It (Remix)"; T.I. – "What You Know"; Yung Joc (featuring Nitti) – "It's Goin' Down"	**The Black Eyed Peas – "My Humps"**; Common – "Testify"; Daddy Yankee – "Rompe"; Three 6 Mafia (featuring Young Buck, 8Ball and MJG) – "Stay Fly"; Kanye West (featuring Jamie Foxx) – "Gold Digger"
Best Dance Video	Best Direction in a Video
**The Pussycat Dolls (featuring Snoop Dogg) – "Buttons"**; Nelly Furtado (featuring Timbaland) – "Promiscuous"; Madonna – "Hung Up"; Sean Paul – "Temperature"; Shakira (featuring Wyclef Jean) – "Hips Don't Lie"	**Gnarls Barkley – "Crazy" (Director: Robert Hales)**; 10 Years – "Wasteland" (Director: Kevin Kerslake); AFI – "Miss Murder" (Director: Marc Webb); Common – "Testify" (Director: Anthony Mandler); Red Hot Chili Peppers – "Dani California" (Director: Tony Kaye)
Best Choreography in a Video	Best Special Effects in a Video
**Shakira (featuring Wyclef Jean) – "Hips Don't Lie" (Choreographer: Shakira)**; Christina Aguilera – "Ain't No Other Man" (Choreographer: Jeri Slaughter); Madonna – "Hung Up" (Choreographer: Stefanie Roos); Sean Paul – "Temperature" (Choreographer: Tanisha Scott); The Pussycat Dolls (featuring Snoop Dogg) – "Buttons" (Choreographer: Mikey Minden)	**Missy Elliott – "We Run This" (Special Effects: Louis Mackall and Tonia Wallander)**; Angels & Airwaves – "The Adventure" (Special Effects: Jack Effects); Beck – "Hell Yes" (Special Effects: Hammer & Tongs); Pearl Jam – "Life Wasted" (Special Effects: Fernando Apodaca); U2 – "Original of the Species" (Special Effects: John Leamy and Lawrence Nimrichter)
Best Art Direction in a Video	Best Editing in a Video
**Red Hot Chili Peppers – "Dani California" (Art Director: Justin Dragonas)**; 10 Years – "Wasteland" (Art Director: Trae King); Common – "Testify" (Art Director: David Ross); Panic! at the Disco – "I Write Sins Not Tragedies" (Art Directors: Lindy McMichael, Jamie Drake and Erin Wieczorek); Shakira (featuring Wyclef Jean) – "Hips Don't Lie" (Art Director: Laura Fox)	**Gnarls Barkley – "Crazy" (Editor: Ken Mowe)**; The All-American Rejects – "Move Along" (Editor: J.D. Smyth); Angels & Airwaves – "The Adventure" (Editor: Clark Eddy); Red Hot Chili Peppers – "Dani California" (Editor: Peter Goddard); U2 – "Original of the Species" (Editor: Olivier Wicki)
Best Cinematography in a Video	Best Video Game Soundtrack
**James Blunt – "You're Beautiful" (Director of Photography: Robbie Ryan)**; AFI – "Miss Murder" (Director of Photography: Welles Hackett); Prince – "Black Sweat" (Director of Photography: Checco Varese); Red Hot Chili Peppers – "Dani California" (Director of Photography: Tony Kaye); Ashlee Simpson – "Invisible" (Director of Photography: Jeff Cutter)	**Marc Eckō's Getting Up: Contents Under Pressure (Atari)**; Burnout Revenge (Electronic Arts); Driver: Parallel Lines (Atari); Fight Night Round 3 (Electronic Arts); NBA 2K6" (2K Games)
Best Video Game Score	Ringtone of the Year
**The Elder Scrolls IV: Oblivion (Composer: Jeremy Soule)**; Dreamfall: The Longest Journey (Composer: Leon Willett); Electroplankton (Composer: user generated soundtrack); Hitman: Blood Money (Composer: Jesper Kyd); Ghost Recon: Advanced Warfighter (Composer: Tom Salta)	**Fort Minor (featuring Holly Brook) – "Where'd You Go"**; The Black Eyed Peas – "My Humps"; Bubba Sparxxx (featuring Ying Yang Twins) – "Ms. New Booty"; Nelly (featuring Paul Wall) – "Grillz"; Kanye West (featuring Jamie Foxx) – "Gold Digger"
MTV2 Award	Viewer's Choice
**Thirty Seconds to Mars – "The Kill"**; Lil Wayne – "Fireman"; Taking Back Sunday – "MakeDamnSure"; Three 6 Mafia (featuring Young Buck, 8Ball and MJG) – "Stay Fly"; Yung Joc (featuring Nitti) – "It's Goin' Down"	**Fall Out Boy – "Dance, Dance"**; Chris Brown (featuring Juelz Santana) – "Run It!"; Kelly Clarkson – "Because of You"; Rihanna – "SOS"; Shakira (featuring Wyclef Jean) – "Hips Don't Lie"
Video Vanguard Award
**Hype Williams**

== Artists with multiple wins and nominations ==
Artists who received multiple awards
Wins	Artist
2	Gnarls Barkley
2	James Blunt

Artists who received multiple nominations
Nominations	Artist
7	Red Hot Chili Peppers
7	Shakira
5	Madonna
5	Panic! at the Disco
4	Christina Aguilera
3	AFI
3	Angels & Airwaves
3	Chris Brown
3	Common
3	Gnarls Barkley
3	James Blunt
3	Kanye West
3	Nelly Furtado
2	10 Years
2	Atari
2	Busta Rhymes
2	Electronic Arts
2	Fall Out Boy
2	Kelly Clarkson
2	Rihanna
2	Sean Paul
2	The All-American Rejects
2	The Black Eyed Peas
2	The Pussycat Dolls
2	Thirty Seconds to Mars
2	Three 6 Mafia
2	T.I.
2	U2
2	Yung Joc

== Music Videos with multiple wins and nominations ==
Music Videos that received multiple awards
Wins	Artist	Music Video
2	Gnarls Barkley	"Crazy"
2	James Blunt	"You're Beautiful"

Music Videos that received multiple nominations
Nominations	Artist	Music Video
7	Red Hot Chili Peppers	"Dani California"
7	Shakira (featuring Wyclef Jean)	"Hips Don't Lie"
5	Madonna	"Hung Up"
5	Panic! at the Disco	"I Write Sins Not Tragedies"
4	Christina Aguilera	"Ain't No Other Man"
3	AFI	"Miss Murder"
3	Angels & Airwaves	"The Adventure"
3	Common	"Testify"
3	Gnarls Barkley	"Crazy"
3	James Blunt	"You're Beautiful"
3	Kanye West (featuring Jamie Foxx)	"Gold Digger"
3	Nelly Furtado (featuring Timbaland)	"Promiscuous"
2	10 Years	"Wasteland"
2	Busta Rhymes (featuring Mary J. Blige, Rah Digga, Missy Elliott, Lloyd Banks, Papoose, and DMX)	"Touch It (Remix)"
2	Chris Brown (featuring Juelz Santana)	"Run It!"
2	Fall Out Boy	"Dance, Dance"
2	Kelly Clarkson	"Because of You"
2	Rihanna	"SOS"
2	Sean Paul	"Temperature"
2	The All-American Rejects	"Move Along"
2	The Black Eyed Peas	"My Humps"
2	The Pussycat Dolls (featuring Snoop Dogg)	"Buttons"
2	Thirty Seconds to Mars	"The Kill"
2	Three 6 Mafia (featuring Young Buck, 8Ball and MJG)	"Stay Fly"
2	T.I.	"What You Know"
2	U2	"Original of the Species"
2	Yung Joc (featuring Nitti)	"It's Goin' Down"

== Contests ==
=== VMA Karaoke Contest ===
In this contest, participants picked one of three songs and made a video of themselves singing their choice. Winners received a paid trip to the 2006 MTV Video Music Awards.

=== VMA Insider Contest ===
The winner selected by voters at mtv.com received a paid trip to the 2006 MTV Video Music Awards, and was allowed to interview all the stars on the red carpet.

=== "Reveal the Real You" Contest ===
Participants sent in a story of "a moment in their life that makes them, them." Winners received an all-expenses-paid trip to the 2006 MTV Video Music Awards, as well as the chance to win a trip to the VMAs in 2007.

== See also ==
- 2006 MTV Europe Music Awards – Music awards show held in Copenhagen, Denmark
