= Esthero discography =

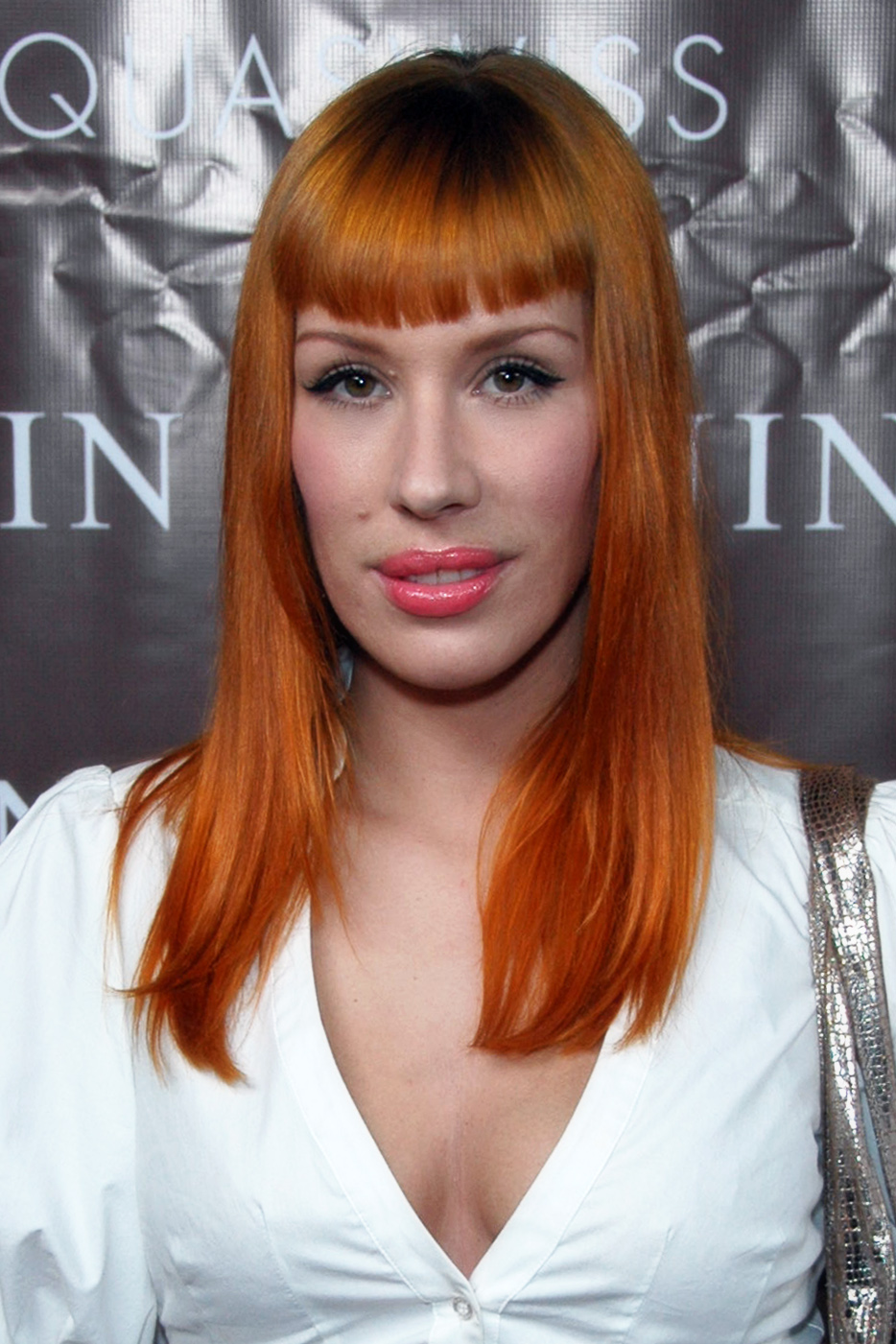
- Esthero in 2008
- Studio albums: 3
- EPs: 2
- Singles: 7
- Music videos: 7

Canadian singer/songwriter Esthero has released three studio albums, two extended plays, and seven singles as a lead artist. Her debut album, Breath from Another, was released with Doc McKinney in 1998. The album initially unsuccessful, though it eventually managed to sell more than 110,000 copies in the US and more than 50,000 in Canada. The record spawned three singles: "Breath from Another", "Heaven Sent", and "That Girl". "Heaven Sent" went into moderate rotation on MTV and peaked in the top 5 on the Hot Dance Breakouts Single Sales chart. Breath from Another received a nomination at the 1999 Juno Awards, in the category of "Best Alternative Album." However, it lost to Rufus Wainwright's eponymous debut album.

After her label, Work Group, was consumed by a larger label, Esthero was released from her contract; in the years between her dropping from the label and the release of her next EP, she provided guest vocals for songs by a variety of artists, including Ian Pooley, Nelly Furtado, and Black Eyed Peas. Her Black Eyed Peas collaboration, "Weekends," gave her her first chart entry in the US; it peaked at number 64 on the Hot R&B/Hip-Hop Singles Sales chart. Her Ian Pooley collaboration, "Balmes (A Better Life)", was a top 75 hit on the UK Singles Chart; it also gave her her first top 40 hit on the US Dance Club Songs chart. She also recorded a solo song, "O.G. Bitch", which was released in 2004 and topped the US Dance Club Songs chart.

In 2004, she released an EP titled We R In Need of a Musical Revolution. The EP was met with praise from critics and spawned a single of the same name; the video went into rotation on MuchMusic Canada. The following year, she released her sophomore album, Wikked Lil' Grrrls, which spawned the hit single "Fastlane", which earned Esthero a second top 5 hit on the Dance Club Songs chart. After the release of the album, Esthero continued to provide guest vocals, and wrote music for other artists, including Kanye West and Kidz in the Hall. She finally returned with solo material in 2012 with Everything Is Expensive, which she funded using pledges from PledgeMusic. The album spawned one single, "Never Gonna Let You Go", which was a minor hit in Canada, earning her her first chart entry there.

== Studio albums ==
Title	Details	Peak chart positions	Sales/Certifications
Title	Details	US Heat.	Sales/Certifications
Breath from Another	Released: 28 April 1998; Label: Work, Columbia, Sony Music; Formats: CD, cassette	—	CAN: 50,000; US: 118,000
Wikked Lil' Grrrls	Released: 28 June 2005; Label: Reprise; Formats: CD	24	
Everything Is Expensive	Released: 30 October 2012; Label: XL, Columbia; Formats: Digital download, CD, LP	13	
"—" denotes an album that did not chart or was not released in that territory.

== Extended plays ==
Title	Details
Short of Breath	Released: 1998; Label: Work; Format: CD
We R in Need of a Musical Revolution!	Released: 23 November 2004; Label: Warner Bros.; Format: CD

== Singles ==
=== As lead artist ===
List of singles as lead artist, with selected chart positions, showing year released and album
Title	Year	Peak chart positions		Album
Title	Year	CAN	US Dance	Album
"Breath from Another"	1998	—	—	Breath from Another
"Heaven Sent"	1998	—	—	Breath from Another
"That Girl"	1998	—	—	Breath from Another
"O.G. Bitch"	2003	—	1	Non-album single
"We R in Need of a Musical Revolution"	2004	—	—	Wikked Lil' Grrrls
"Fastlane" (featuring Jemeni and Jelleestone)	2005	—	5	Wikked Lil' Grrrls
"Never Gonna Let You Go"	2012	72	—	Everything Is Expensive
"You're A Mean One, Mr Grinch"	2017	—	—	Non-album single
"Baby Steps"	2019	—	—	Non-album single
"Gimme Some Time"	2019	—	—	Non-album single
"Emotional Animal"	2020	—	—	Non-album single

=== As featured artist ===
Title	Year	Peak chart positions			Album
Title	Year	AUS	UK	US Dance	Album
"Weekends" (The Black Eyed Peas featuring Esthero)	2000	93	—	—	Bridging the Gap
"Balmes (A Better Life)" (Ian Pooley featuring Esthero)	2001	—	65	35	Since Then
"—" denotes a single that did not chart or was not released in that territory.

== Other charted songs ==
Title	Year	Peak	Album
Title	Year	US	Album
"Undertow" (Timbaland featuring The Fray and Esthero)	2009	100	Shock Value II
"Can You Feel It" (Timbaland featuring Sebastian (rapper) and Esthero)	2009	-	Shock Value II

== Other guest appearances ==
Title	Year	Lead artist	Album
"Country Livin' (The World I Know)"	1998	Goodie Mob	Slam
"Final Home (vocal version)"	1998	DJ Krush	Kakusei
"Song for Holly"	1999	Esthero featuring Danny Saber	Go
"The Hero"	2000	j. englishman	Poor Lil' Rockstar
"Don't Wanna Be Your Slave"	2000	Michie Mee	The First Cut Is the Deepest
"Priceless"	2000	Rascalz	Global Warning
"Tao of Now"	2001	Saul Williams	Amethyst Rock Star
"I Feel You"	2001	Nelly Furtado	Whoa, Nelly!
"The Universal Quest"	2001	Lisa Lopes	Supernova
"How Could I?"	2002	John Forté	I, John
"Run for Your Life"	2002	Jarvis Church	Shake It Off
"Keep the Beat"	2002	WarChild Canada	Much Dance 2003
"The Streets Where You Live"	2002	The Buried Heart Project	Women & Songs 6
"White Rabbit"	2003	Blue Man Group	The Complex
"Heaven"	2003	Sugar Ray	In Pursuit of Leisure
"Coming Down"	2003	The Oddities	The Scenic Route
"One Life"	2003	Last Emperor and Poetic	Music, Magic, Myth
"Summertime"	2004	Mos Def	Mos Def Presents Medina Green
"Life"	2004	Artists for WarChild Canada	Much Dance 2004
"Summer Breeze"	2004	Onda	The Isley Brothers - Taken to the Next Phase
"Too Rude"	2005	Carmen Rizzo	The Lost Art of the Idle Moment
"Shine"	2006	Boney James	Shine
"Another Great Love Gone By"	2006	Vikter Duplaix	Bold and Beautiful
"Make U Fly"	2006	Zion I & The Grouch	Heroes in the City of Dope
"Yes We Can"	2008	will.i.am	—
"Street Lights"	2008	Kanye West	808s & Heartbreaks
"Can You Feel It?"	2009	Timbaland	Shock Value II
"Wavin' Flag" (K'naan cover)	2010	Young Artists for Haiti	—
"Spaceship"	2010	Stat Quo	Statlanta
"That Good"	2011	Kidz in the Hall	Occasion
"Don't Pass Me By"'	2011	Spree Wilson	The Never Ending Now
"21 Jump Street"	2012	Rye Rye	—
"Firecracker"	2017	Michael Bernard Fitzgerald	Yes
"Me & U"	2018	Parker Lane	REPLAY
"Falling (Acoustic)"	2020	Chin Injeti	—
"Get It"	2022	Phlake	Phine
"Famous (Esthero's Version)"	2022	Michael Bernard Fitzgerald	Love Valley Rearranged (Deluxe)

== Music videos ==
Title	Year	Director	Ref.
"Heaven Sent"	1998	Philip Harder	
"That Girl"	1998	Patrick Hoelck	
"Weekends"	2000	Brian Beletic	
"Balmes (A Better Life)"	2001	Max Zimmerman	
"We R in Need of a Musical Revolution"	2004	Noble Jones	
"Never Gonna Let You Go"	2012	Sean Michael Turrell	
"Emotional Animal"	2020	Giovanni & Niccolo Cerretelli	
