= Black Eyed Peas discography =

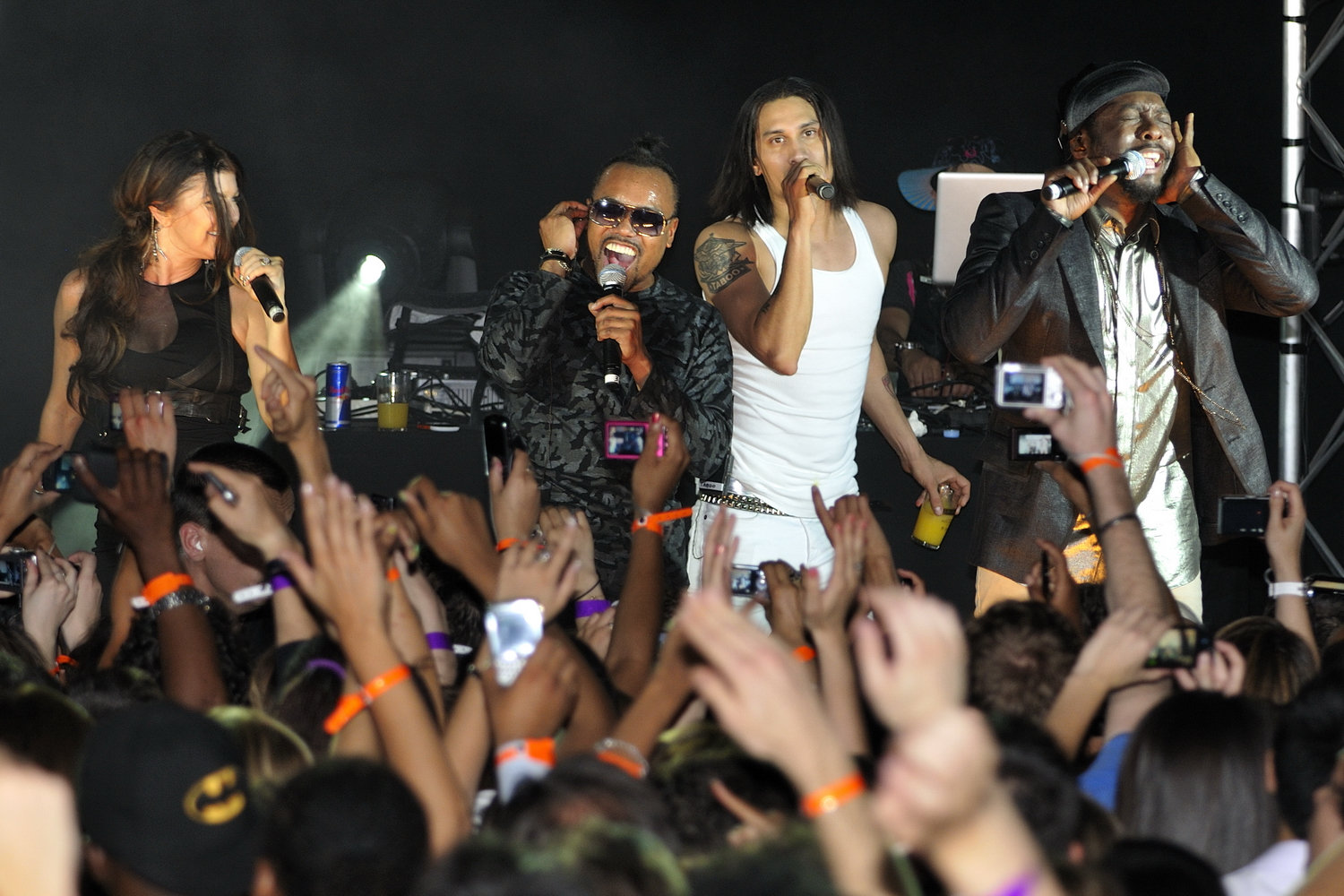
- The Black Eyed Peas performing in Paris in 2009.
- Studio albums: 9
- Extended plays: 1
- Compilation albums: 2
- Singles: 40
- Video albums: 2
- Music videos: 38
- Promotional singles: 8

The American hip hop group Black Eyed Peas has released nine studio albums, two compilation albums, one extended play, forty singles, eight promotional singles, thirty-eight music videos, and two video albums. Interscope Records released the band's debut album, Behind the Front, in the United States in June 1998. Although the album received a four-star review from AllMusic, it charted low on the Billboard 200 in the United States and on the French Albums Chart, at numbers 129 and 149 respectively. The band's second album, Bridging the Gap, was released in 2000 and peaked at number 67 in the US and reached its highest position in New Zealand, at number 18.

In 2003, the Black Eyed Peas released its third album, Elephunk, which included the singles "Where Is the Love?", the band's first international number-one single, "Shut Up", "Hey Mama", and "Let's Get It Started". The album peaked at number fourteen in the US and was certified two times platinum by the Recording Industry Association of America. It peaked at number one on the Australian Albums Chart; number two on the Canadian Albums Chart, French and New Zealand Albums Chart; and number three in the UK Albums Chart. Their fourth album, entitled Monkey Business, was released in 2005 and reached number two in the US and number one in many countries. It spawned their two highest-charting singles on the Billboard Hot 100 at the time, "Don't Phunk with My Heart" and "My Humps", both of which reached number three.

In 2009, the Black Eyed Peas released their fifth studio album, The E.N.D.. It became their highest-charting album in the US, reaching number one. The first single from the album, "Boom Boom Pow", peaked at number one on the Billboard Hot 100, making it the band's first US number-one hit, and held onto the top spot for twelve weeks until the album's second single, "I Gotta Feeling", replaced it. "I Gotta Feeling" also replaced "Boom Boom Pow" at the top of the charts in Canada and Australia and peaked at number one in numerous other countries, including the United Kingdom. The album's third single, "Meet Me Halfway", has peaked at number one in Australia, Germany and the UK and reached the top ten in the US. The fourth single, "Imma Be", became the group's third number-one single on the Billboard Hot 100.

In 2010, the Black Eyed Peas released their sixth studio album, The Beginning. The first single from the album, "The Time (Dirty Bit)", reached number 1 on the UK Singles Chart on December 12. The second single was "Just Can't Get Enough", and it was released in February 2011. The album's third single was "Don't Stop the Party", and it was released in May 2011. In 2015, they celebrated their 20th anniversary and released the songs "Awesome" and "Yesterday". Today, the group has sold approximately 35 million albums and 120 million singles worldwide. Following Fergie's departure from the band in 2016, they released three albums: Masters of the Sun Vol. 1, Translation, and Elevation.

== Albums ==
=== Studio albums ===
List of albums, with selected chart positions, sales figures and certifications
Title	Album details	Peak chart positions										Sales	Certifications
Title	Album details	US	AUS	AUT	CAN	FRA	GER	NL	NZ	SWI	UK	Sales	Certifications
Behind the Front	Released: June 30, 1998; Label: Interscope; Formats: CD, cassette, LP, digital download	129	—	—	—	149	—	—	—	—	—	US: 197,000	
Bridging the Gap	Released: September 26, 2000; Label: Interscope; Formats: CD, cassette, LP, digital download	67	37	—	—	—	82	—	18	—	—	US: 258,000	RMNZ: Gold
Elephunk	Released: June 24, 2003; Label: A&M; Formats: CD, cassette, LP, digital download	14	1	3	2	2	6	5	2	1	3	US: 3,204,000; GER: 200,000	RIAA: 4× Platinum; ARIA: 4× Platinum; BPI: 5× Platinum; BVMI: Platinum; IFPI AUT: Gold; IFPI SWI: Platinum; MC: 7× Platinum; RMNZ: 4× Platinum; SNEP: Platinum
Monkey Business	Released: June 7, 2005; Label: A&M; Format: CD, cassette, LP, digital download	2	1	2	1	1	1	3	1	1	4	US: 4,272,000; UK: 1,065,834	RIAA: 5× Platinum; ARIA: 6× Platinum; BPI: 4× Platinum; BVMI: Platinum; IFPI AUT: Gold; IFPI SWI: 2× Platinum; MC: 6× Platinum; RMNZ: 5× Platinum; SNEP: 2× Gold
The E.N.D.	Released: June 9, 2009; Label: Interscope; Formats: CD, LP, digital download	1	1	5	1	1	2	8	1	2	3	US: 3,200,000; FRA: 710,000; UK: 1,464,360	RIAA: 6× Platinum; ARIA: 4× Platinum; BPI: 5× Platinum; BVMI: 2× Platinum; IFPI SWI: 2× Platinum; MC: 5× Platinum; RMNZ: 5× Platinum; SNEP: Diamond
The Beginning	Released: November 30, 2010; Label: Interscope; Formats: CD, LP, digital download	6	6	7	2	1	2	34	12	3	8	US: 800,000; CAN: 27,400; FRA: 459,300+ ·	RIAA: Platinum; ARIA: Platinum; BPI: Platinum; BVMI: Gold; IFPI AUT: Gold; IFPI SWI: Platinum; RMNZ: 2× Platinum; SNEP: Diamond
Masters of the Sun Vol. 1	Released: October 26, 2018; Label: Interscope; Format: CD, LP, digital download	—	—	—	—	112	—	—	—	55	— (Note: Masters of the Sun Vol. 1 did not chart on the UK Albums Chart, but reached number 72 on the UK Album Downloads Chart.)		
Translation	Released: June 19, 2020; Label: Epic; Format: CD, LP, digital download, streaming	52	—	45	8	13	57	18	—	11	—		SNEP: Platinum
Elevation	Released: November 11, 2022; Label: Epic; Format: CD, LP, digital download, streaming	—	—	—	—	89	—	—	—	—	—		
"—" denotes a release that did not chart.

=== Compilation albums ===
List of albums
Title	Album details	Notes
iTunes Originals – The Black Eyed Peas	Released: September 20, 2005; Label: Interscope; Formats: Digital download	Contains live session tracks, interviews and tracks taken from Behind the Front (1998), Elephunk (2003) and Monkey Business (2005).
The E.N.D. Summer 2010 Canadian Invasion Tour: Remix Collection	Released: July 27, 2010; Label: Interscope; Formats: Digital download	Remixes of songs from The E.N.D. (2009).

== Extended plays ==
List of EPs
Title	EP details	Notes
Renegotiations: The Remixes	Released: March 21, 2006; Label: A&M, will.i.am; Formats: CD, digital download	Contains songs and remixes of songs from Monkey Business (2005).
Boom Boom Beats: Kids Mix	Released: April 18, 2025; Label: A&M, will.i.am; Formats: Digital download, streaming	Contains songs from The E.N.D. (2009)

== Singles ==
=== As lead artist ===
List of singles, with selected chart positions and certifications, showing year released and album name
Title	Year	Peak chart positions										Certifications	Album
Title	Year	US	AUS	AUT	CAN	GER	IRL	NL	NZ	SWI	UK	Certifications	Album
"Fallin' Up/¿Que Dices?"	1997	—	—	—	—	—	—	—	—	—	—		Behind the Front
"Joints & Jam"	1998	—	—	—	—	—	—	—	—	—	53		Behind the Front
"Karma"	1999	—	—	—	—	—	—	93	—	—	—		Behind the Front
"BEP Empire" / "Get Original"	2000	—	—	—	—	—	—	—	—	—	—		Bridging the Gap
"Weekends" (featuring Esthero)	2000	—	93	—	—	100	—	—	—	—	—		Bridging the Gap
"Request + Line" (featuring Macy Gray)	2001	63	21	—	—	85	45	86	10	—	31		Bridging the Gap
"Where Is the Love?"	2003	8	1	1	1	1	1	1	1	1	1	RIAA: 5× Platinum; ARIA: 4× Platinum; BPI: 4× Platinum; BVMI: 5× Gold; RMNZ: 6× Platinum	Elephunk
"Shut Up"	2003	— (Note: "Shut Up" did not chart on the Billboard Hot 100, but peaked at number 30 on the Billboard Mainstream Top 40.)	1	1	1	1	1	2	1	1	2	RIAA: Gold; ARIA: 2× Platinum; BPI: Platinum; BVMI: 3× Gold; IFPI AUT: Gold; IFPI SWI: Platinum; RMNZ: Platinum (Note: To retrieve album certifications from the Recording Industry Association of New Zealand, select the field "Top 40 Album Chart" along the following: "Chart #1379" for "Where Is the Love?" (Platinum); "Chart #1399" for "Shut Up" (Platinum); "Chart #1413" for "Hey Mama" (Gold); "Chart #1475" for "Don't Phunk with My Heart" (Platinum); "Chart #1492" for "My Humps" (Gold); "RIANZ certification". Recording Industry Association of New Zealand. Archived from the original on June 25, 2007.)	Elephunk
"Hey Mama"	2004	23	4	4	9	5	5	5	4	3	6	RIAA: Platinum; ARIA: Gold; BPI: Silver; RMNZ: Gold	Elephunk
"Let's Get It Started"	2004	21	2	18	2	18	11	11	6	13	11	RIAA: 4× Platinum; ARIA: Platinum; BPI: Platinum; BVMI: Gold; RMNZ: 2× Platinum	Elephunk
"Don't Phunk with My Heart"	2005	3	1	5	2	8	4	2	1	3	3	RIAA: 2× Platinum; ARIA: Platinum; BPI: Gold; RMNZ: Platinum	Monkey Business
"Don't Lie"	2005	14	6	6	22	12	11	4	5	11	6	ARIA: Gold; BPI: Silver; RMNZ: Platinum	Monkey Business
"My Humps"	2005	3	1	4	1	4	1	4	1	3	3	RIAA: 5× Platinum; ARIA: Platinum; BPI: Platinum; BVMI: Gold; RMNZ: 2× Platinum	Monkey Business
"Pump It"	2006	18	6	14	7	19	3	15	2	8	3	RIAA: 4× Platinum; ARIA: Gold; BPI: 2× Platinum; BVMI: Gold; RMNZ: 3× Platinum	Monkey Business
"Boom Boom Pow"	2009	1	1	3	1	3	3	4	2	4	1	RIAA: Diamond; ARIA: 4× Platinum; BPI: 2× Platinum; BVMI: Gold; IFPI SWI: Platinum; MC: 8× Platinum; RMNZ: 2× Platinum	The E.N.D.
"I Gotta Feeling"	2009	1	1	1	1	3	1	1	1	1	1	RIAA: 15× Platinum; ARIA: 13× Platinum; BPI: 5× Platinum; BVMI: 5× Gold; IFPI SWI: 2× Platinum; MC: Diamond; RMNZ: 8× Platinum; SNEP: Platinum	The E.N.D.
"Meet Me Halfway"	2009	7	1	4	5	1	2	3	3	3	1	RIAA: 5× Platinum; ARIA: 3× Platinum; BPI: 3× Platinum; BVMI: Platinum; IFPI SWI: Gold; MC: 2× Platinum; RMNZ: 4× Platinum	The E.N.D.
"Imma Be"	2009	1	7	—	5	49	—	—	—	—	55	RIAA: 6× Platinum; ARIA: Platinum; BPI: Silver; MC: Platinum; RMNZ: Platinum	The E.N.D.
"Rock That Body"	2010	9	8	6	36	10	9	17	16	17	11	RIAA: 3× Platinum; ARIA: 3× Platinum; BPI: Platinum; BVMI: Gold; MC: Gold; RMNZ: 2× Platinum	The E.N.D.
"Missing You"	2010	—	—	—	—	—	—	—	—	—	—		The E.N.D.
"The Time (Dirty Bit)"	2010	4	1	1	1	1	2	2	1	1	1	ARIA: 3× Platinum; BPI: Platinum; BVMI: 3× Gold; IFPI SWI: 2× Platinum; RMNZ: 2× Platinum; SNEP: Platinum	The Beginning
"Just Can't Get Enough"	2011	3	3	2	5	9	7	11	4	3	3	ARIA: 3× Platinum; BPI: Platinum; BVMI: Gold; IFPI SWI: Platinum; RMNZ: 3× Platinum; SNEP: Gold	The Beginning
"Don't Stop the Party"	2011	86	16	5	18	27	10	75	9	25	17	ARIA: Platinum; BPI: Silver; IFPI SWI: Gold; RMNZ: Gold	The Beginning
"Whenever"	2011	—	—	—	—	—	—	—	—	—	—		The Beginning
"#Wheresthelove" (featuring The World)	2016	—	15	—	—	—	—	—	— (Note: "#Wheresthelove" did not enter the NZ Top 40 Singles Chart, but peaked at number three on the NZ Heatseeker Singles Chart.)	41	47		Non-album single
"Ring the Alarm, Pt.1, Pt.2, Pt.3"	2018	—	—	—	—	—	—	—	—	—	—		Masters of the Sun Vol. 1
"Constant Pt. 1 & 2" (featuring Slick Rick)	2018	—	—	—	—	—	—	—	—	—	—		Masters of the Sun Vol. 1
"Big Love"	2018	—	—	—	—	—	—	—	—	—	—		Masters of the Sun Vol. 1
"Be Nice" (featuring Snoop Dogg)	2019	—	—	—	—	—	—	—	—	—	—		Non-album single
"Mami" (with Piso 21)	2019	—	—	—	—	—	—	—	—	—	—	RIAA: Gold (Latin)	El Amor En Los Tiempos Del Perreo
"Explosion" (with Anitta)	2019	—	—	—	—	—	—	—	—	—	—		Non-album single
"Ritmo" (with J Balvin)	2019	26	100	67	31	24	53	72	—	6	—	RIAA: 2× Platinum; ARIA: Gold; BPI: Silver; BVMI: Gold; IFPI AUT: Gold; IFPI SWI: Platinum; MC: 3× Platinum; RMNZ: Gold	Bad Boys for Life and Translation
"Mamacita" (with Ozuna and J. Rey Soul)	2020	62	—	44	11	31	—	6	—	7	—	RIAA: Platinum; BVMI: Gold; IFPI AUT: Gold; IFPI SWI: Platinum; MC: 2× Platinum	Translation
"Feel the Beat" (with Maluma)	2020	—	—	—	—	—	—	—	—	74	—		Translation
"Vida Loca" (with Nicky Jam and Tyga)	2020	—	—	—	—	—	—	—	—	—	—		Translation
"Girl Like Me" (with Shakira)	2020	67	—	—	59	—	89	—	—	28	—	RIAA: Platinum; BPI: Silver; IFPI SWI: 2× Platinum; RMNZ: Gold	Translation
"Hit It" (featuring Saweetie and Lele Pons)	2021	—	—	—	—	—	—	—	—	—	—		Non-album single
"El Teke Teke" (with Carlos Vives and Play-N-Skillz)	2022	— (Note: "El Teke Teke" did not chart within the Billboard Hot 100 chart, but peaked at number 7 on the Billboard Latin Digital Song Sales chart.)	—	—	—	—	—	—	—	—	—	RIAA: Gold (Latin)	Cumbiana II
"Don't You Worry" (with Shakira and David Guetta)	2022	—	—	12	57	43	—	39	—	51	—	IFPI AUT: Platinum; IFPI SWI: Gold; MC: Gold	Elevation
"Pump It Louder" (with Tiësto)	2022	—	—	—	—	—	—	—	— (Note: "Pump It Louder" did not enter the NZ Top 40 Singles Chart, but peaked at number 28 on the NZ Hot Singles Chart.)	—	—	RMNZ: Gold	Drive
"Simply the Best" (with Anitta and El Alfa)	2022	—	—	—	—	—	—	—	—	—	—		Elevation
"Double D'z" (with J. Rey Soul)	2022	—	—	—	—	—	—	—	—	—	—		Elevation
"Bailar Contigo" (with Daddy Yankee)	2023	—	—	—	—	—	—	—	—	—	—	SNEP: Gold	Elevation
"Guarantee"	2023	—	—	—	—	—	—	—	—	—	—		Elevation
"Tonight" (with El Alfa featuring Becky G)	2024	—	—	—	—	—	—	—	—	—	—		Bad Boys: Ride or Die
"—" denotes releases that did not chart.

=== As featured artist ===
List of singles, with selected chart positions, showing year released and album name
Title	Year	Peak chart positions								Certifications	Album
Title	Year	US Dance	AUT	FRA	GER	IRL	NL	SWI	UK	Certifications	Album
"Mas que Nada" (Sérgio Mendes featuring the Black Eyed Peas)	2006	13	8	40	9	9	1	4	6	BPI: Silver; BVMI: Gold	Timeless
"Shake Ya Boom Boom" (Static & Ben El Tavori featuring the Black Eyed Peas)	2020	—	—	—	—	—	—	—	—		Non-album single
"—" denotes releases that did not chart.

=== Promotional singles ===
List of singles, with selected chart positions, showing year released and album name
Title	Year	Peak chart positions			Album
Title	Year	US Bub.	CAN	UK	Album
"Bebot"	2006	—	—	—	Monkey Business
"Alive"	2009	2	62	88	The E.N.D.
"Do It Like This"	2010	—	—	—	The Beginning
"Light Up the Night"	2010	—	99	—	The Beginning
"Yesterday"	2015	—	—	—	Non-album single
"Street Livin'"	2018	—	—	—	Masters of the Sun Vol. 1 (Japan Edition)
"Get It"	2018	—	—	—	Masters of the Sun Vol. 1 (Japan Edition)
"No Mañana" (with El Alfa)	2020	—	—	—	Translation
"—" denotes releases that did not chart.

== Other charted songs ==
List of singles, with selected chart positions, showing year charted and album name
Title	Year	Peak chart positions				Album
Title	Year	US Pop	AUS	CAN	UK Dance	Album
"Gone Going" (featuring Jack Johnson)	2006	37	—	—	—	Monkey Business
"Showdown"	2009	—	66	—	—	The E.N.D
"Love You Long Time"	2010	—	—	—	36	The Beginning
"Someday"	2010	—	—	80	—	The Beginning
"—" denotes a song that did not chart.

== Video albums ==
List of video albums, with selected certifications
Title	Details	Certifications
Behind the Bridge to Elephunk	Released: May 31, 2004; Label: Interscope; Format: DVD	ARIA: Gold
Live from Sydney to Vegas	Released: December 4, 2006; Label: A&M; Format: DVD	ARIA: Platinum

== Music videos ==
=== As lead artist ===
List of music videos, showing year released and director
Title	Year	Director(s)
"Head Bobs"	1998	Brian Beletic
"Fallin' Up"	1998	Brian Beletic
"Joints & Jams"	1998	Brian Beletic
"Karma"	1998	Brian Beletic
"What It Is"	1999	Brian Beletic
"BEP Empire"	2000	Brian Beletic
"Weekends"	2000	Brian Beletic
"Request + Line"	2001	Joseph Kahn
"Get Original"	2001	Anthony Mandler
"Where Is the Love?"	2003	will.i.am
"Shut Up"	2003	The Malloys
"Hey Mama"	2004	Rainbows & Vampires/Fatima Robinson
"Let's Get It Started"	2004	Francis Lawrence
"The Apl Song"	2004	Patricio Ginelsa
"The Boogie That Be"	2004	Patricio Ginelsa
"Don't Phunk with My Heart"	2005	The Malloys
"Don't Lie"	2005	The Saline Project
"My Humps"	2005	Fatima Robinson & Malik Sayeed
"Like That"	2005	Syndrome/Nabil Elderkin
"Pump It"	2006	Francis Lawrence
"Bebot"	2006	Patricio Ginelsa
"Union"	2006	Patricio Ginelsa
"Mas Que Nada"	2006	Syndrome/Nabil Elderkin
"Boom Boom Pow"	2009	Mat Cullen & Mark Kudsi
"I Gotta Feeling"	2009	Ben Mor
"Meet Me Halfway"	2009	Ben Mor
"Imma Be Rocking That Body"	2010	Rich Lee
"XOXOXO"	2010	Pasha Shapiro & Ernst Weber
"The Time (Dirty Bit)"	2010	Rich Lee, Pasha Shapiro & Ernst Weber
"Just Can't Get Enough"	2011	Ben Mor
"Don't Stop the Party"	2011	Ben Mor
"Yesterday"	2015	Pasha Shapiro & Alissa Torvinen
"#Wheresthelove"	2016	Michael Jurkovac
"Street Livin"	2018	Pasha Shapiro
"Ring the Alarm pt.1, pt.2, pt.3"	2018	Mazik Self
"Get It"	2018	Ben Mor
"Constant pt.1, pt.2"	2018	will.i.am & Ernst Weber
"Big Love"	2018	will.i.am
"Dopeness"	2018	Ben Mor
"Yes or No"	2018	Shadae Lamar Smith
"New Wave"	2018	Shadae Lamar Smith
"Back 2 Hiphop"	2018	Shadae Lamar Smith
"Vibrations pt.1, pt.2"	2019	Shadae Lamar Smith
"4Ever"	2019	Kevin Chao
"Get Ready"	2019	Kevin Chao
"Be Nice"	2019	Kevin Chao
"Explosion"	2019	will.I.am, Pasha Shapiro & Ernst Weber
"Ritmo (Bad Boys for Life)"	2019	Colin Tilley
"Ritmo (Bad Boys for Life)" (Remix)	2019	Colin Tilley
"Mamacita"	2020	Director X
"No Mañana"	2020	will.i.am & Sterling Hampton
"Feel the Beat"	2020	Ben Mor
"Action"	2020	will.i.am, Pasha Shapiro & Ernst Weber
"Vida Loca"	2020	Ben Mor
"Shake Ya Boom Boom"	2020	Kevin Chao
"The Love"	2020	will.i.am & Sterling Hampton
"Girl Like Me"	2020	Rich Lee
"Don't You Worry"	2022	Director X
"Simply the Best"	2022	Kevin Chao
"Double D'z"	2022	Kevin Chao
"Bailar Contigo"	2023	Kevin Chao

== Other appearances ==
Title	Year	Other artist(s)	Album
"Complete Beloved"	2000	—N/a	Love & Basketball
"I Want Cha"	2001	—N/a	Scary Movie
"Magic"	2001	Terry Dexter	Legally Blonde
"La Paga (Remix)"	2003	Juanes	Mi Sangre (Tour Edition 2005)
"For the People"	2004	—N/a	Yu-Gi-Oh! The Movie
"Get Your Hands Up"	2006	Fergie	The Dutchess
"Express Yourself"	2007	—N/a	Bratz: Motion Picture Soundtrack
"Someday"	2010	—N/a	Knight and Day
"One"	2010	U2	The 25th Anniversary Rock & Roll Hall Of Fame Concerts
"Gimme Shelter"	2010	U2 and Mick Jagger	The 25th Anniversary Rock & Roll Hall Of Fame Concerts

== See also ==
- Fergie discography
- will.i.am discography
