= Gene Hardy =

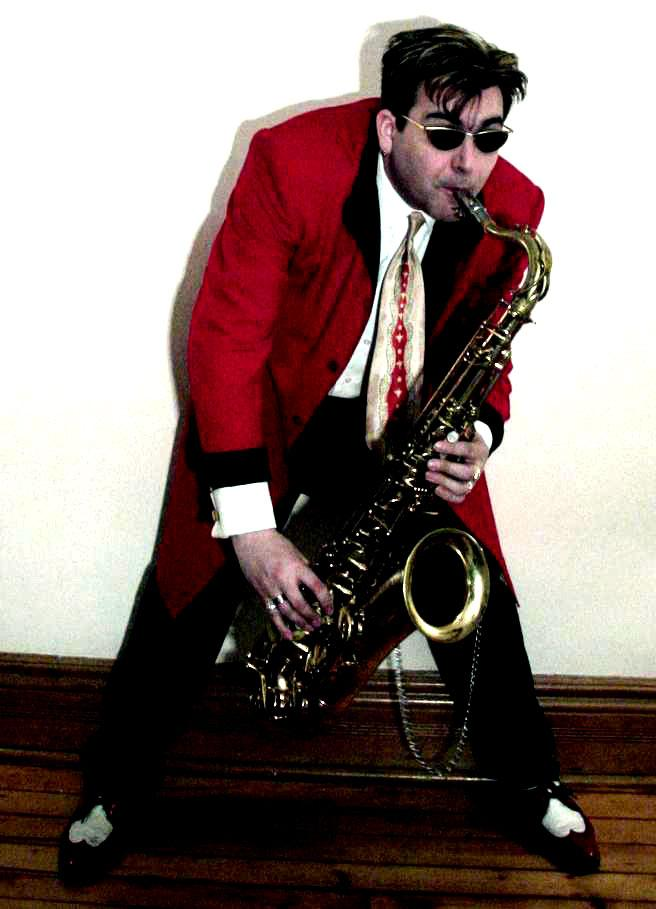

Background information
- Origin: Toronto, Ontario, Canada
- Occupation: Musician
- Instruments: Saxophone, violin, musical saw, theremin
- Years active: 1979–present
- Website: genehardy.com

Gene Hardy is a Canadian multi-instrumentalist and vocalist. He performs on saxophone, violin, musical saw and theremin.

== Career ==
Hardy's early music training began in Victoria, British Columbia—first on violin at age 9, then on saxophone a year later. After studies at the Victoria Conservatory of Music and UVic, he moved to Toronto in 1986. In 1988 he joined Canadian alternative rock band Bourbon Tabernacle Choir.

After the Bourbon's break-up in the mid-1990s, he became the horn player for many of Canada's best known exports and domestic successes, recording and performing in the United States and Canada. He served as Michael Bublé's musical director and featured soloist and is the latest addition to Ronnie Hawkins' band, The Hawks.

From 2000 to 2005, Hardy was nominated as Horn Player of the Year at the Canada's Maple Blues Awards in recognition of his extensive contributions to the blues genre, both live and in the studio.

He is also known as a session player on musical saw, and has been featured on numerous recordings, including BNL's Born on a Pirate Ship and Veda Hille's Spine. His saw playing can also be heard on jingles for an assortment of products and services including ads for Halls Cough Drops, Kia Cars, and Scott's Turfbuilder. A long awaited instrumental saw CD, entitled Musical Saw Encounters, is slated for release in early 2015.

His newest group, The Pip Squeek Orchestra, described as a dixieland-band-on-steroids, debuts fall 2007 with a new CD and a line-up of players from Vancouver, Victoria and Toronto.

To date, Hardy has released four CDs as a solo artist. He continues to travel, perform and record extensively, dividing his time between Toronto, Vancouver, Victoria and New Orleans.

== Discography ==
=== Solo albums ===
- Gene Hardy & Sparkjiver – Gene Hardy & Sparkjiver (CD, 2000)
- Gene Hardy & Sparkjiver – FunkyBluesyJazzyChurchy (CD, 2002)
- Gene Hardy – Blow!Blow!Blow! (CD, 2004)
- Gene Hardy & The Pip Squeek Orchestra – Gene Hardy & The Pip Squeek Orchestra (CD, 2007)

=== Contributions ===
- Bourbon Tabernacle Choir – Sister Anthony (1990)
- Big Sugar – Big Sugar (1992)
- Bourbon Tabernacle Choir – Superior Cackling Hen (1992)
- Barenaked Ladies – Gordon (1992) No. 1 CAN, US gold
- Rheostatics – Whale Music (1992)
- Big Sugar – Five Hundred Pounds (1993)
- Rheostatics – Music from The Motion Picture Whale Music (1994)
- Barenaked Ladies – Maybe You Should Drive (1994) No. 175 US, No. 57 UK
- Rheostatics – Introducing Happiness (1994)
- Bourbon Tabernacle Choir – Shy Folk (1995)
- Barenaked Ladies – Born on a Pirate Ship (1996) No. 111 gold U.S., No. 18 Canada
- Veda Hille – Spine (1996)
- Bourbon Tabernacle Choir – Simply the Best 1985–1995 (2000)
- Kevin Quain – Tequila Vampire Matinee (CD, 2000)
- Neil Leyton – Midnight Sun (2003, Fading Ways)
- Esthero – We R in Need of a Musical Revolution (CD EP, 2004, Reprise Records)
- Esthero – Wikked Lil' Grrrls Samplers (Version 1 & 2) (CD, 2005, Warner Bros. Records)
- Esthero – Wikked Lil' Grrrls (CD, 2005, Warner Bros. Records)
- Esthero – Fastlane Remixes (CD, 2005, Warner Bros. Records)
- Dean Drouillard – Dream at Harmony Motel (CD, 2005)
- Adam Warner – No Place to Lay (CD, 2006)
- Kevin Quain – Winter in Babylon (CD, 2007)
- Chuck Jackson – A Cup of Joe (CD, 2012, Linus Records)

== TV and film ==
- General Hospital (TV series)
- Ups And Downs (film)
- Colin James Presents the Blues Masters (TV special, 1997)
- Hemingway Vs. Callahan (CBC mini-series, 2003)
- Take The Lead (film, 2006)
- Sounds Like Motown (documentary, 2007)
- Motown High (documentary, 2008)
- Numerous appearances on MuchMusic, 1990–present
- The Being FRANK Show (TV talk / variety show, 2011–present)
