= 900 Degrees =

2000 song performed by Ian Pooley

Single by Ian Pooley

from the album Since Then
- Released: 2000
- Length: 6:13
- Label: V2 Records
- Songwriters: Pooley; A. Winbush; Kevin Spenser; R. Moore; Darnell Smith; William Shelby

Ian Pooley singles chronology
"Coração Tambo" (2000)	"900 Degrees" (2000)	"Balmes (A Better Life)" (2001)

"900 Degrees" is a song by German DJ and producer Ian Pooley. The song was released as a single from his sixth studio album, Since Then, released in October 2001. Upon its release, the song peaked within the top 60 on the UK Singles chart and remained Pooley's highest-peaking UK single for more than a year, until his 2002 single "Piha" peaked higher. The song also entered the Billboard Hot Dance Breakouts Maxi-Single Sales chart, becoming his first chart entry there.

== Composition and recording ==
"900 Degrees" samples three songs: "Make That Move," a 1980 soul/funk song recorded by Shalamar, "I Love You More," a 1981 soul song recorded by Rene and Angela, and "Do It To The Music", a 1982 boogie/post-disco song recorded by Raw Silk. The song was one of two on Since Then to feature vocals from Rosanna and Zelia. The song has a BPM of 126 beats per minute.

== Reception ==
=== Critical ===
John Bush, writing for AllMusic, described the song as "familiar-sounding." Groove Armada listed the song as one of their favorites in a 2001 issue of Spin magazine.

=== Commercial ===
Upon its release, the song proved successful both in the United Kingdom and the United States. On the UK Singles Chart, the song debuted at number 57 on the chart dated March 10, 2000; it was the highest chart position Pooley had attained up to that point. In its next and final week on the chart, the song fell to number 87. The track remained Pooley's highest-peaking until 2002, when "Piha" debuted at number 53 on the UK Singles Chart.

The song also achieved some crossover success in the United States, peaking at number 5 on Billboard's Hot Dance Breakouts Maxi-Singles Sales chart. It was his first song to chart in the United States, and remained his only charting single there until his Esthero collaboration "Balmes (A Better Life)" became a top 40 hit on the Dance Club Songs chart the following year.

== Track listings ==
UK CD Single

1. 900 Degrees (Radio Edit)
2. 900 Degrees (Pooley's New Mix)
3. 900 Degrees (Tom Middleton Cosmos Party Mix)

German CD Single

1. 900 Degrees (Radio Edit)
2. 900 Degrees (Pooley's New Mix)
3. 900 Degrees (Tom Middleton Cosmos Party Mix)
4. 900 Degrees (Pete Heller Main Mix)

== Charts ==
Chart (2000)	Peak position
UK Singles (Official Charts Company)	57
US Hot Dance Breakouts Maxi-Single Sales (Billboard)	5
