= Fastlane (song) =

Single by Esthero

from the album Wikked Lil' Grrrls
- Released: July 28, 2005
- Recorded: 2005
- Genre: Dance-pop; trip hop; electronica
- Length: 4:56
- Label: Reprise
- Songwriters: Esthero; Krista Gonzales; Doc McKinney
- Producer: Adam-12

Esthero singles chronology
"We R in Need of a Musical Revolution" (2004)	"Fastlane" (2005)	"Never Gonna Let You Go" (2012)

"Fastlane" is a song by Canadian singer-songwriter Esthero. It also features vocals from Jemeni and a rap by Canadian rapper Jelleestone, and is included on her 2005 album Wikked Lil' Grrrls.

== Background ==
In April 2005, Reprise Records announced that they were finalizing several remixes of "Fastlane," which was released ahead of "Wikked Lil Grrrls." The label tapped DJs including Richard Morel, Cottonbelly, and Chris Brann to remix the song. Billboard stated that the song "intertwines drum 'n' bass and hip-hop."

== Track listing ==
Adapted from Discogs.

1. Cottonbelly Mix – 6:26
2. Rudimaican Mix – 4:25
3. Rudimental Mix – 5:00
4. Wamdue Main Mix – 6:50
5. Jim Albert's Midnight Samba Vocal Mix – 7:49
6. Morel's Pink Noise Vox – 8:34
7. L.E.X. Sound Factory Revisited Mix – 9:29

== Chart performance ==
"Fastlane" performed well in the US. It entered Billboard's Dance Club Songs chart on July 30, 2005. It eventually entered the top 10, peaking at number 5 and spending a total of 15 weeks on the list.

"Fastlane" also performed moderately well on the Dance Singles Sales chart, where it also reached the top 10, though it stalled at number 9, spending only 4 weeks on the chart.
