= Wikked Lil' Grrrls =

Studio album by Esthero
- Released: June 28, 2005
- Recorded: 2003–2005
- Genre: Electronica; hip-hop; R&B; soul; jazz; pop
- Length: 67:57
- Label: Reprise
- Producer: Esthero; Kamillion; Adam 12; Doc McKinney; Track & Field; Sean Lennon; Camara Kambon; Keith Crouch

Esthero chronology
Breath from Another (1998)	Wikked Lil' Grrrls (2005)	Everything Is Expensive (2012)

Singles from Wikked Lil' Grrrls
- 1. "We R in Need of a Musical Revolution!" Released: November 23, 2004; 2. "Fastlane" Released: April 23, 2005

Wikked Lil' Grrrls is the second studio album by Canadian singer Esthero. It was released on June 28, 2005 in North America by Reprise Records.

It marked her first release since her 1998 debut Breath from Another, and was the first project released solely by Esthero since the disbanding of the eponymous duo consisting of herself and producer Doc McKinney, who produced the entirety of Breath from Another alongside Esthero. However, Doc does return as a producer for certain tracks on Wikked Lil' Grrrls.

Wikked Lil' Grrrls elicited mixed reviews upon release, with contemporary music critics generally praising her vocal performance but expressing mixed feelings regarding the record's eclecticism. The album gave Esthero her first album chart entry in the US, reaching number 24 on the US Heatseekers Albums chart. The album was promoted by the two singles, "We R in Need of a Musical Revolution" and "Fastlane."

== Background and recording ==
Esthero left WORK in late 1999 due to poor sales of her first album Breath from Another, and the label's absorption into Epic Records.

She eventually signed with Reprise Records, a Warner Music Group label. Orlando Puerta, marketing director at Reprise, noted: "Somehow she persevered, and she is special enough for us not to let go of her."

Esthero began writing material for the album prior to her departure from Sony Music. After four years, she began recording for the album in late 2003.

In November 2004, a six-song promotional EP entitled We R in Need of a Musical Revolution was released. The title track, alongside the tracks "Everyday Is a Holiday (With You)" and "Gone" (featuring Sean Lennon and CeeLo Green respectively), were later featured on Wikked Lil' Grrrls.

The track "Junglebook" originally contained a guest appearance from American rapper André 3000, but was ultimately not featured on the album. In a 2021 interview on the Can't Knock the Shuffle podcast, hosted by Sean Kantrowitz, Esthero revealed that the feature was left off because Warner Music Group attempted to issue the song as the lead single, despite her protest, resulting in Esthero and André 3000 conspiring to dissuade Warner by having André demand more money and for the feature to be credited to his alias, "Johnny Vulture"; this ultimately led to Warner refusing to release this version altogether, resulting in the original CD release featuring only Esthero.

== Musical style ==
The album was noted for its diversity of musical styles.

Vibe described the album's style as "an alternately futuristic and vintage soundscape of reggae, jazz, hip-hop, and electronica." AllMusic's Johnny Loftus commented that the album falls "in a drifty place between modernized trip-hop (and) mild R&B."

Regarding the album's stylistic eclecticism, Esthero stated in an interview with The Washington Post that her "taste is so vast it ends up like a premixed iPod shuffle."

== Critical reception ==
Professional ratings
Aggregate scores
Source	Rating
Metacritic	(57/100)
Review scores
Source	Rating
AllMusic	2.5/5 stars
Entertainment Weekly	B-
Slant Magazine	4/5 stars

The album received generally mixed reviews from most music critics. At Metacritic, which assigns a normalised rating out of 100 to reviews from mainstream critics, the album received an average score of 57, based on 8 reviews, which indicates "mixed or average reviews".

Johnny Loftus of AllMusic felt that Wikked Lil' Grrrls is a "personal statement, if not a labor of love"; however, he deemed that the album "occasionally gets lost between songwriting, thematics, and stylistic flow". He gave the album 2.5 stars out of 4 and noted "We R in Need of a Musical Revolution", "Everyday Is a Holiday (With You)" and "If Tha Mood" as the album's highlights. In an extremely negative review from Splendid Magazine, Mike Meginnis said, "A towering monument to Esthero's overpowering sense of self satisfaction, this mess overstays its welcome and abuses whatever attention you're willing to spend on it. In short, it's not a career highlight".

Some critics were more favorable in their assessments of the album. Sal Cinquemani, of Slant Magazine, was highly positive in his review of the album, awarding it four out of five stars, and commenting that the album "establishes her as the progenitor of what could be called electro-ethno-pop". Billboard was also positive, calling the album "another eclectic musical trip". Rolling Stone gave the album three stars out of five and called it "lyrically feisty and stylistically expanded".

== Release and promotion ==
=== Singles ===
The album included two singles. "We R in Need of a Musical Revolution", the opening track, was first released as part of a six-song EP of the same name, released in November 2004. An accompanying music video was filmed and released to promote the song, but the single failed to chart.

The second single, "Fastlane," premiered in April 2005; it was released commercially on July 28, 2005 as the second single from the album. It reached number five on the Billboard Hot Dance Club Songs, becoming her second Top 5 on the chart (her first being the non-album single "O.G. Bitch" (2004)).

=== Live performances ===
To promote the album, Esthero appeared on "Jimmy Kimmel Live" on July 7, 2005. She also opened for John Legend.

== Commercial performance ==
The album gave Esthero her first album chart entry in the US. The album debuted at number 24 on the Billboard Heatseekers Albums chart dated July 16, 2005.

== Uses in media ==
The title track appeared on the soundtracks to Miss Congeniality 2 and John Tucker Must Die, a season five episode of Smallville, and was used in an early promotion for the TV shows Desperate Housewives, and Las Vegas.

"Everyday Is a Holiday (With You)" was featured in the 2005 film Monster-in-Law, and was used in a season two episode of the ABC medical drama Grey's Anatomy.

== Track listing ==
No.	Title	Writer(s)	Producer(s)	Length
1.	"We R in Need of a Musical Revolution"	Esthero, James Robertson, Jully Black, Spookey Ruben	James Robertson, Spookey Ruben, Esthero	4:06
2.	"Dragonfly's Intro"	Jemeni		1:32
3.	"Blanket Me in You (Never Is So Soon)"	Esthero, Adam Bravin	Adam 12, Esthero	4:58
4.	"Everyday Is a Holiday (With You)" (feat. Sean Lennon)	Esthero, Sean Lennon	Esthero, Sean Lennon	4:05
5.	"Thank Heaven 4 You"	Esthero, Camara Kambon	Camara Kambon	4:30
6.	"If Tha Mood" (feat. Shakari Nyte)	Doc McKinney, Kobe Eshun, Krista Gonzales	Doc McKinney	4:31
7.	"Bad Boy Clyde"	Esthero, Krista Gonzales	Doc McKinney	3:36
8.	"Beautiful Lie"	Esthero, Larry Kline	Esthero	5:10
9.	"Junglebook"	Esthero, Brian West, Gerald Eaton	Track & Field, Esthero	4:49
10.	"My Honeybrown"	Cree Summer		0:26
11.	"Wikked Lil' Grrrls"	Esthero, Krista Gonzales, Malik Worthy	Doc McKinney, Malik Worthy, Esthero	4:18
12.	"Gone" (feat. CeeLo Green)	Esthero, Keith Crouch, Green, Jubu	Keith Crouch, Kamillion, Esthero	5:16
13.	"My Torture"	Esthero, Bravin, Oliver Johnson	Adam 12, Esthero	6:26
14.	"Melancholy Melody"	Esthero, James Poyser	Esthero	4:36
15.	"Fastlane" (feat. Jelleestone & Jemeni)	Esthero, Krista Gonzales, Doc	Doc McKinney	4:53
16.	"Dragonfly's Outro"	Esthero, Bill Conti	Adam 12, Esthero	4:05
17.	"Brave Bear Woman"			0:18
Total length:				67:57

Notes

- "My Torture" contains a sample of "Slave Song" (2000) by Sade.

== Personnel and credits ==
Adapted from AllMusic and album booklet.

Instruments

- Scott Alexander — bass
- Bryden Baird — horn, trumpet
- Colin Barrett — bass
- Ron Blake — flugelhorn
- Stephen Bradley — horn
- Peter Cardinali — bass
- William Carn — horn
- Terry Clarke — drums
- Greg Critchley — drums
- Keith Crouch — vox organ
- Bob DeAngelis — clarinet
- Steven Donald — horn
- Steve Dwyer — tenor saxophone
- Adrian Eccleston — guitar
- Mike Elizondo — bass
- Jason Englishman — guitar
- Brian Green — drums
- Gene Hardy — horn, musical saw
- Gordie Johnson — guitar
- Oliver Johnson — guitar
- Dave Kahne — keyboards
- Camara CKmbon — drum programming, keyboards
- Larry Kline — bass
- Trevor Lawrence — drums
- Rick Lazar — percussion
- Sean Lennon — keyboards, guitar, piano
- Lil Dukes Up — clapping, snaps
- Andre Manga — bass
- Steve McDade — trumpet
- Gabrial McNair — horn
- Ravi Naimpally — tabla
- Graph Nobel — vox organ
- Mike Olsen — cello
- Owen Pallett — violin
- Terry Promane — trombone
- James Robertson — bass, guitar, keyboards
- Spookey Ruben — bass
- Michael Stewart — alto sax, flute
- Tom Szczesniak — piano
- Chuck Treece — bass, drums
- Brian West — guitar
- Malik Worthy — guitar

Production

- Adam 12 — keyboards, production, programming
- Rick Aoyama — digital editing, engineering
- Austin Bascom — drum programming, engineering
- Keith Crouch — audio production, production, programming
- Matt DeMatteo — mixing
- Victor Florencia — mixing
- Serban Ghenea — mixing
- Mike Haas — engineering
- Helix Hadar — engineering
- Chad Irschick — engineering
- Dave Kahne — programming
- Camara Kambon — audio production
- James Robinson — audio production, production, programming
- Rafa Sardina — vocal engineering
- Spookey Ruben — audio production, production, programming
- Track and Field — production
- Brian West — programming
- Malik Worthy — production, programming

Miscellaneous

- Michael Creagh — photography
- Larry Kline — production concept

== Charts ==
Chart (2003)	Peak position
US Heatseekers Albums (Billboard)	24

== See also ==
- Esthero discography
