= Bailar Contigo =

Bailar Contigo may refer to:

- "Bailar Contigo" (Carlos Vives song), 2013
- "Bailar Contigo", a song by Black Eyed Peas and Daddy Yankee, 2023
