= Rosanna Tavares =

Rosanna Tavares (7 November 1961 – 9 October 2006) was a Brazilian singer, percussionist and guitarist. She was known as the lead singer of Rosanna & Zélia, a duo which received much critical acclaim in much of mainland Europe.

== Early life ==
Born in Nanuque, Minas Gerais, Rosanna Tavares enjoyed singing and began participating in her first singing contests when she was as young as eight years old. In 1974, her family moved from Itaúna near the Bahian border, to Belo Horizonte, where they quickly came into contact with the wide-ranging music scene in the capital of Minas Gerais. It was there she was first introduced to Zélia Fonseca, with whom she performed alongside for 30 years.

== Career ==
After discovering that the band's music had been very successful in Europe, Rosanna & Zélia began more extensive touring, with much time spent in Portugal. Their paths led through France and Finland to Germany, where in 1993, they finally settled in Frankfurt. The duo collaborated with many musicians of Latin American and jazz scene, including Dino Saluzzi, Howard Levy, Katharina Franck, Shantel and German dance producer Ian Pooley.

== Death ==
The last two years of Tavares' life were determined by her own fight with cancer, which proved too difficult. She died on 9 October 2006 in Belo Horizonte, Brazil.
