= That Girl (Esthero song) =

Single by Esthero

from the album Breath from Another
- Released: 17 June 1999
- Recorded: 1996
- Genre: Soul jazz; R&B; trip hop; pop
- Length: 4:41 (album version); 3:58 (single version)
- Label: Sony Music Entertainment
- Songwriters: Esthero; Doc McKinney
- Producers: Esthero; Doc McKinney

Esthero singles chronology
| "Heaven Sent" (1998) | "That Girl" (1999) | "Weekends" (2000) |

"That Girl" is a song by Canadian singer-songwriter Esthero. It was planned to be album second CD-single from her debut album Breath from Another. However the record company declined to release the song as a single after disappointing sales of the album, although its video picked up Canadian airplay.
Song received positive reviews from critics who called it "brass-tinged" and compared it to songs by smooth jazz group Swing Out Sister.

== Music video ==
Despite no official release of the single, a music video for the song was released in June 1999 and received airplay on Canadian and American TV. The music video for the song was filmed on 17–18 April 1999 in Toronto and directed by Patrick Hoelck.

=== Synopsis ===
The music video features Esthero as an alien living in a sealed glass room in the middle of a busy street presumably because she can't breathe air outside. She's occasionally visited by a young man she's attracted to (played by Tony Ward) and after dreaming about following him around the city in regular clothing, she decides to leave the room, wearing a clear plastic spacesuit for protection. She then walks to a restaurant where she sees the young man chatting with another girl and takes the suit off. After passing out off-screen, she wakes in the glass room with her love interest looking at her and smiling before she smiles back.

=== Accolades ===
The music video was nominated for "Cinematography of the Year" at the 1998 MuchMusic Video Awards, ultimately losing to "Release" by The Tea Party.

== Use in media ==
The track was featured in the 1998 slasher film I Still Know What You Did Last Summer.

== Track listing ==
- Promo
1. "That Girl" (radio version) - 3:58
2. "That Girl" (album version) - 4:41
