= Heaven Sent (Esthero song) =

Single by Esthero

from the album Breath from Another
- A-side: "Breath from Another"
- Released: 2 June 1998
- Recorded: 1996
- Genre: Trip hop; alternative rock
- Length: 4:29 (Album version); 4:04 (Single version)
- Label: Sony Music Entertainment
- Songwriters: Esthero; Doc McKinney
- Producer: Doc McKinney

Esthero singles chronology
"Breath from Another" (1998)	"Heaven Sent" (1998)	"That Girl" (1999)

"Heaven Sent" is a song by Canadian singer-songwriter Esthero. It was released as first official (second overall) single from her debut album Breath from Another and peaking at number four on the Billboard Hot Dance Breakout Singles Sales chart.

The song was featured on the VH1 show Breaking Bonaduce.

== Writing ==
Esthero and Doc McKinney wrote the song in a single night in August 1996.

== Music video ==
The music video for the single was filmed in June 1998 and released the next month. It was heavily influenced by Luis Buñuel avant-garde silent movie Un Chien Andalou starring Salvador Dalí. It was directed by Phil Harder. In late 1998, the video premiered on MTV, where it received some airplay. The video also went into rotation on MuchMusic. A promotional VHS featuring the music video was also released, and is now something of a collector's item.

The music video went into moderate rotation on MTV, reaching number 27 on their list of most-played videos, peaking on the chart dated August 15, 1998.

== Track listing ==
- CD Single
1. "Heaven Sent" - 4:29
2. "Heaven Sent" (Mad Professor Dub) - 4:56
3. "Breath From Another" (Part 7 & 11 Remix) - 6:36
4. "Breath From Another" (DJ Krust Sitting On Chrome Mix) - 10:08
5. "Breath From Another" (Orpheus Floating Mix)- 7:17

== Charts ==
Chart (1998)	Peak position
Billboard Hot Dance Breakouts Maxi Single Sales	4
Billboard MTV Most-Played Music Videos	27
