= Never Gonna Let You Go (Esthero song) =

Single by Esthero

from the album Everything Is Expensive
- Released: June 5, 2012
- Recorded: 2010–2012
- Genre: Pop
- Length: 3:52
- Label: Sony/Esthero
- Songwriter(s): Esthero; Adam Bravin; Jenny Bea Englishman
- Producer(s): Esthero; Adam Bravin

Esthero singles chronology
"Fastlane" (2005)	"Never Gonna Let You Go" (2012)	"You're a Mean One, Mr. Grinch" (2017)

"Never Gonna Let You Go" is a song by Canadian singer/songwriter Esthero. It was released as the lead single from her third studio album, Everything Is Expensive. Upon its release, the song became a hit in her native Canada, and peaked within the top 75 on the Canadian Hot 100, becoming her first entry on that chart.

An accompanying music video, directed by Sean Michael Turrell, premiered on YouTube in August 2012, and depicts a young girl who is in love with her male doll. The song was used in a season 9 episode of Grey's Anatomy.

== Background and composition ==
Following the commercial disappointment of Wikked Lil' Grrrls, Esthero was dropped from Reprise Records. She took a hiatus as a solo artist, though collaborated with many artists during that time. Seven years after the release of Wikked Lil' Grrrls, she announced that she would be releasing a new album, funded through PledgeMusic. She released a new song, "Never Gonna Let You Go," to promote the album.

"Never Gonna Let You Go" features a piano, which plays throughout the song; percussion in the form of hand claps; and synthesizers. The lyrics explore possessive relationships and what lengths one would go to keep her lover.

== Music video ==
The song's music video premiered on YouTube on August 17, 2012. Esthero stated in a 2012 interview that it was the director, Sean Michael Turrell's, idea to use a child in the video, stating that she "had a different idea — this surreal, twisted world with characters, where at the end the reveal would be that it all came from the mind of this little girl. He took the ideas I had and made the video his own."

=== Synopsis ===
The video follows a little girl who is in love with her male doll; when she walks in on the doll with a female, Barbie-like doll, however, she ties the female doll to a chair before sticking both dolls in the oven. Before they completely melt, she retrieves them from the oven, throws the female doll into a pool, and hugs the male doll tight. The video makes extensive use of stop-motion animation.

== Use in media ==
"Never Gonna Let You Go" was used in a season 9 episode of Grey's Anatomy, titled "This Is Why We Fight."

== Chart performance ==
"Never Gonna Let You Go" debuted on the Canadian Hot 100 on the chart dated September 15, 2012. The song spent 13 weeks on the chart, peaking at number 72, and becoming her only charting hit in Canada.

== Charts ==
Chart (2012)	Peak position
Canada (Canadian Hot 100)	72
Canada CHR/Top 40 (Billboard)	33
Canada Hot AC (Billboard)	20
