= Since Then =

Studio album by Ian Pooley
- Released: 10 October 2000
- Recorded: 1999–2000
- Genre: House
- Length: 61:03
- Label: V2 Records

Ian Pooley albums chronology
| The Allnighter/Calypso (1999) | "Since Then" (2000) | The IP Series (2002) |

Singles from Singles from Since Then
- 1. "Coracao Tambor" Released: 2000; 2. "900 Degrees" Released: 2000; 3. "Balmes" Released: 2001; 4. "Balmes (A Better Life)" Released: 2001

Since Then is an album by German DJ Ian Pooley. The album spawned two hit singles: "900 Degrees" and "Balmes (A Better Life)," featuring Esthero. The album was intended as an audio travelog to complement the travel photography included in the album's booklet.

== Release ==
The album was released on 10 October 2000, on V2 Records; it is now out-of-print.

== Critical reception ==
Professional ratings
Review scores
| Source | Rating |
|---|---|
| Allmusic | 3/5 stars |
| Amazon | Positive |
| Entertainment Weekly | C+ |

The album received mixed-to-positive reviews upon its release. In a review for Allmusic, John Bush praised the album's programming and overall sound, concluding that "'Since Then' is a breath of fresh air on a stifling summer day." A similarly positive review for Amazon.com, written by Fred Cisterna, called the album "pleasingly varied," also praising the album's cohesion.

Entertainment Weekly's review was far less positive. Reviewer Tony Scherman concluded that "when Pooley aspires to songcraft, he falls short," giving the album a "C+"

The album was also included on a number of critics' year-end lists. The album was number 12 on Pitchfork reviewer Paul Cooper's year-end albums list, and number 14 on fellow Pitchfork critic Richard Juzwiak's list.

== Singles ==
"Since Then" spawned four singles, two of which charted. Though the first two singles, "Coracao Tambor" and the album version of "Balmes," failed to chart, the next two singles performed better. The third, a remix of "Balmes (A Better Life)," featured Canadian singer/songwriter Esthero and reached number 65 in the UK, also peaking at number 34 on the Dance Club Songs chart in the US. The fourth and final single, "900 Degrees," peaked at number 57 on the Official UK Singles Chart.

== Track listing ==
All tracks written, produced, and performed by Ian Pooley, except where noted.

International Edition
| No. | Title | Writer(s) | Guest Vocalists | Length |
|---|---|---|---|---|
| 1. | "Coração Tambor (Intro)" | Ian Pooley | | 2:56 |
| 2. | "Venasque" | Pooley | | 4:32 |
| 3. | "Since Then" | Pooley | | 5:25 |
| 4. | "Bay of Plenty" | Pooley | | 6:26 |
| 5. | "Coração Tambor" | Pooley; Rosanna & Zélia | Rosanna & Zélia | 5:54 |
| 6. | "Balmes" | Pooley | | 6:50 |
| 7. | "Visions" | Pooley; Kirsty Hawkshaw | Kirsty Hawkshaw | 6:05 |
| 8. | "Spicy Snapper" | Pooley | | 5:36 |
| 9. | "Menino Brincadeira" | Pooley; Rosanna & Zélia | Rosanna & Zélia | 4:02 |
| 10. | "900 Degrees" | Pooley; A. Winbush; Kevin Spenser; R. Moore; Darnell Smith; William Shelby | | 6:13 |
| 11. | "Sundowner" | Pooley | | 7:29 |
| 12. | "Cloud Patterns" | Pooley | | 13:52 |
| Total length: | | | | 70:03 |

Notes:

- "900 Degrees" contains a samples of "I Just Love You More" by René & Angela and "Make That Move" by Shalamar.
- After the final listed track, "Cloud Patterns," there is a hidden track, an interview Ian Pooley did with a New Zealand radio station. It begins playing after sixty seconds of silence.
- "Venasque" contains a sample of "les Wagonnets" by French singer Michel Jonasz, excerpts of a sketch by French comedians Elie et Dieudonné, and a jingle of the French radio Rires et Chansons. Ian pooley was listening to this radio while on vacation in the city of Venasque, in Provence.

== Credits ==
Musicians

- Ian Pooley – Writer, Producer, Performer, Mixer
- Shaun Lee – Guitar on Track 7
- Rosanna & Zélia – Percussion & Guitar on Tracks 5 & 9

Personnel

- Tom Gillierson – Engineer
