= Bridging the Gap (Black Eyed Peas album) =

2000 studio album by Black Eyed Peas

Studio album by Black Eyed Peas
- Released: September 26, 2000
- Genre: Hip-hop
- Length: 62:50
- Labels: Interscope; will.i.am
- Producers: will.i.am; apl.de.ap; Rhett Lawrence; DJ Premier; Wyclef Jean; Jerry Duplessis

Black Eyed Peas chronology
Behind the Front (1998)	Bridging the Gap (2000)	Elephunk (2003)

Singles from Bridging the Gap
- 1. "BEP Empire" / "Get Original" Released: August 8, 2000; 2. "Weekends" Released: August 29, 2000; 3. "Request + Line" Released: January 30, 2001

Professional ratings
Aggregate scores
Source	Rating
Metacritic	74/100
Review scores
Source	Rating
AllMusic	4/5 stars
The A.V. Club	(favorable)
Dotmusic	link
HipHopDX.com	link
Q	3/5 stars
RapReviews.com	2000
Robert Christgau	B− link
Rolling Stone	link
The Rolling Stone Album Guide	3.5/5 stars
Spin	(5/10)
Wall of Sound	(68/100) link

Bridging the Gap is the second studio album by American hip-hop group Black Eyed Peas. It was released on September 26, 2000, through Interscope Records and will.i.am Music Group. This is their last album where they are credited as Black Eyed Peas until the release of Masters of the Sun Vol. 1 in 2018.

The album had three official singles: "BEP Empire/Get Original", "Weekends" and "Request + Line", the last featuring Macy Gray. The song "Weekends" was later remixed and renamed "Another Weekend" for the deluxe edition of their fifth studio album, The E.N.D. (2009).

Singer Kim Hill was deeply involved in making the album, but left the group after it was released.

The album received favorable reviews, and holds a score of 74 on Metacritic.

== Track listing ==
No.	Title	Writer(s)	Producers	Length
1.	"BEP Empire"	William Adams; Allan Pineda; Jaime Gomez; Christopher Martin; Curtis Mayfield	DJ Premier	4:39
2.	"Weekends" (featuring Esthero)	Adams; Pineda; Gomez; Tony Butler; Sylvester Stewart	will.i.am	4:46
3.	"Get Original" (featuring Chali2na)	Adams; Pineda; George Pajon, Jr.; Charles Stewart; Clifford Smith; Aldane Browne	will.i.am	2:52
4.	"Hot" (featuring Kim Hill)	Adams; Pineda	apl.de.ap	4:04
5.	"Cali to New York" (featuring De La Soul)	Adams; Kelvin Mercer; Dave Jolicoeur; Daisey Age; Pajon, Jr.	will.i.am	4:47
6.	"Lil' Lil'"	Adams; Pineda; Pajon, Jr.; Michael Fratantuno	will.i.am	4:10
7.	"On My Own" (featuring Les Nubians and Mos Def)	Adams; Pineda; Helene & Celia Faussart; Dante Smith; Kim Hill	will.i.am	3:52
8.	"Release"	Adams; Pineda; Gomez	apl.de.ap	5:07
9.	"Bridging the Gaps"	Adams; Pineda; Pajon, Jr.; John Collins; Bill Withers	apl.de.ap	4:56
10.	"Go Go"	Adams; Pineda; Fratantuno; Arthur Baker; John Robie; Kevin Donovan; Robert Allen; Ellis Williams; Ralf Hütter; Emil Schult	will.i.am	4:53
11.	"Rap Song" (featuring Wyclef Jean)	Adams; Pineda; Gomez; Jean; Jerry Duplessis; James Brown; Charles Bobbit; Bob Byrd	Jean; Duplessis	3:33
12.	"Bringing It Back"	Adams; Pineda	will.i.am	3:36
13.	"Tell Your Mama Come"	Adams; Pineda; Gomez; Pajon, Jr.	will.i.am	3:14
14.	"Request + Line" (featuring Macy Gray) (Hidden track "Empire Strikes Back" begins at 4:52)	Adams; Pineda; Fratantuno; Pajon, Jr.; Rhett Lawrence; Natalie Hinds	Rhett Lawrence; will.i.am	9:21

Notes

- "On My Own" is no longer available on digital releases of the album
- A bonus track titled "Magic" appears before "Empire Strikes Back" on UK editions of the album.

== Personnel ==
- will.i.am – vocals, art direction, composer
- apl.de.ap – vocals, composer
- Taboo – vocals, composer
- Kim Hill – vocals, composer
- George Pajon – guitar
- Printz Board – trumpet, bass, keyboards
- Rhett Lawrence – composer, producer
- Roberto Cani – strings
- Suzanna Giordono – strings
- Susan Chatman – horn section, strings
- Chali 2na – featured artist
- De La Soul – featured artist
- Esthero – featured artist
- Macy Gray – featured artist
- Wyclef Jean – featured artist
- Mos Def – featured artist
- Les Nubians – featured artist
- Ian Alexander – art direction, executive producer
- Dave Pensado – mix engineer
- Dylan Dresdo – mix engineer
- Dejuana Richardson – engineer
- Eddie Sancho – engineer
- Tom Coyne – mastering
- Seth Friedman – package design
- Tatiana Litvin – art coordinator

== Charts ==
Chart (2000–2001)	Peak position
Australian Albums (ARIA)	37
Australian Dance Albums (ARIA)	15
German Albums (Offizielle Top 100)	82
New Zealand Albums (RMNZ)	18
US Billboard 200	67
US Top R&B/Hip-Hop Albums (Billboard)	40

== Certifications ==
Region	Certification	Certified units/sales
New Zealand (RMNZ)	Gold	7,500^{^}
^{^} Shipments figures based on certification alone.
