= Everything Is Expensive =

Everything is Expensive

Studio album by Esthero
- Released: October 30, 2012
- Recorded: 2010–2012
- Genre: Pop; jazz; folk
- Length: 48:30
- Label: Esthero
- Producer: Esthero; Chin Injeti; Adam 12; The Brothers Rise; Justin Trugman; Jamie Rise; Josh Lopez; Bartholomew

Esthero chronology
Wikked Lil' Grrrls (2005)	Everything is Expensive (2012)

Singles from Everything Is Expensive
- 1. "Never Gonna Let You Go" Released: June 5, 2012

Everything Is Expensive is the third studio album by Canadian singer-songwriter Esthero, released on October 30, 2012. The album's lead single, "Never Gonna Let You Go", was released in June 2012.

The album was self-released by Esthero, with a distribution deal through Universal Music in Canada. On September 24, 2012, Esthero signed the project up to PledgeMusic, offering a wide variety of exclusive packages, such as a Korean BBQ with her, a handmade clutch purse, finger paintings and signed CDs.

== Critical reception ==
"Everything Is Expensive" garnered mixed to negative reviews from music critics. Maria Sokulsky-Dolnycky, writing for The Spill Magazine, awarded the album 2 out of 5 stars, praising Esthero's vocal performance but concluding that "the songs lack substance and memorability," going on to call the album "lacklustre at best." Now Think Free's review, written by Anupa Mistry, was similarly negative, stating that the album "is a tepid, confused palette for a musician who displayed a fierce individuality in the past," though praising Esthero's vocals. 2020k praised the album's vulnerability and audio engineering.

== Chart performance ==
The album debuted at number 13 on the US Heatseekers album chart, also reaching two regional charts, the Pacific and South Atlantic Heatseekers charts, where it peaked at numbers 4 and 10, respectively.

== Track listing ==
No.	Title	Writer(s)	Producer(s)	Length
1.	"Crash (Prelude)"	Esthero	Esthero, Chin Injeti	1:48
2.	"Black Mermaid"	Esthero, J. Lake	Esthero	4:18
3.	"Gracefully"	Esthero	Esthero	3:32
4.	"You Don't Get A Song"	Esthero	Esthero, The Brothers Rise	3:30
5.	"Walking On Eggshells"	Jon Levine, Anjulie	Esthero	3:31
6.	"Never Gonna Let You Go"	Esthero, Adam Bravin	Esthero, Adam Bravin	3:52
7.	"Supernatural"	Esthero, Justin Trugman, C. Todd Neilsen, Krista M. Gonzales, Russel Ali	Justin Trugman	3:27
8.	"Go"	Esthero, Greg Wells, T. Lee	Esthero	5:00
9.	"How Do I Get You Alone"	Esthero, Ricky Tillo	Esthero	2:54
10.	"Francis"	Esthero	Esthero, Jamie Rise	4:58
11.	"Everything Is Expensive (The Kids Are Not Alright)"	Esthero, Josh Lopez, Ricky Tillo	Esthero, Josh Lopez	5:33
12.	"Crash" (feat. Jonah Johnson)	Esthero, Josh Lopez, Jonah Johnson, Sean Nelson	Esthero	4:00
13.	"Over"	Bartholomew, Tiffany Goss, Amanda Wilkinson	Bartholomew	2:18
Total length:				48:30

== Charts ==
Chart (2012)	Peak position
US Heatseekers Albums	13
US South Atlantic Heatseekers Albums	10
US Pacific Heatseekers Albums	4
