= Yesterday (Black Eyed Peas song) =

Promotional single by The Black Eyed Peas
- Released: July 17, 2015
- Genre: Hip hop
- Length: 5:20
- Label: Interscope
- Songwriters: William Adams; Jaime Gomez; Allan Lindo
- Producer: will.i.am

"Yesterday" is a song by the Black Eyed Peas, released as a promotional single on July 17, 2015. The song was written by the Peas and produced by front man Will.i.am. The song does not include Fergie, which caused some media speculation as to her membership in the group, but she remained an official member.

== Music video ==
The video, directed by Pasha Shapiro caused controversy when artist Erykah Badu called the group out on Twitter for copying ideas for the music video from her song "Honey".
