= Breath from Another =

Studio album by Esthero
- Released: April 28, 1998
- Recorded: 1996–1997
- Genre: Trip hop; acid jazz; lounge; downtempo; chill-out
- Length: 56:13
- Label: WORK; Columbia (Europe); Epic; Legacy (2023 reissue)
- Producer: Doc McKinney; Esthero

Esthero chronology
Breath from Another (1998)	Wikked Lil' Grrrls (2005)

Singles from Breath from Another
- 1. "Breath from Another" Released: April 28, 1998; 2. "Heaven Sent" Released: June 2, 1998; 3. "That Girl" Released: June 17, 1999

Breath from Another is the debut studio album by Canadian singer-songwriter Esthero, which at the time was a duo consisting of the eponymous singer and producer Martin "Doc" McKinney. It was released on April 28, 1998 by the WORK Group. It is now generally considered a trip hop classic despite poor sales. Despite containing several expletives and sexual content, the album was not released with a Parental Advisory warning. Thanks in part to the success of the album's music videos, the album has sold over 100,000 copies in the United States, and achieved Gold certification in the Esthero's native Canada.

== Background ==
Esthero and Doc McKinney met in January 1996 at the EMI offices in Toronto. The pair's demos sparked interest from Warner Music Group, EMI and BMG in Canada. Esthero's managers, Zack Werner and Beau Randall, signed them directly to Sony Music Entertainment in the U.S. The duo then wrote "Superheroes", "Indigo Boy" and "That Girl". In August 1996, they wrote another 4 tracks, include the single "Heaven Sent".

In late January 1998, prior to the album's release, 15,000 copies of a promotional EP titled "Short of Breath", featuring tracks "Breath from Another", "Heaven Sent", "Country Livin' (The World I Know)" and "That Girl" were sent to Sony Music staff worldwide. McKinney stated in a 2016 NPR interview that, when writing and producing the album, he was inspired by reggae, calypso, and house music, three genres that didn't receive much exposure in his native Minneapolis, also citing Björk, Portishead, and Massive Attack as influences.

== Critical reception ==
Professional ratings
Review scores
Source	Rating
AllMusic	3/5 stars

Breath from Another received positive reviews from music critics. Tom Demalon of AllMusic stated that album "too scrumptious sounding to be ignored", however called it unfocused. He praised tracks "That Girl" and "Country Livin' (The World I Know)" as album's best offerings. Chris Molanphy of CMJ New Music Monthly noted that album sounds "slick for starters; clamorous but never abrasive, yearning but not very dark" and "organic". The A.V. Club's review, penned by David Peisner, was also positive, commenting that while some of the songs were unimaginative, some (such as "Heaven Sent" and "Country Livin'") were more unusual, and praising Esthero's vocals as "sublime" and "sultry".

=== Accolades ===
At the Juno Awards of 1999, the album received a nomination for "Best Alternative Album." However, it lost to Rufus Wainwright's eponymous debut album. In 2016, the album was nominated for a Polaris Heritage Prize, for best album from 1996 to 2005. The album lost, however, to Arcade Fire's "Funeral" (which won the public vote) and Lhasa de Sela's "La Llorona" (which won the jury vote).

== Commercial performance ==
Despite not charting in any country, the album sold 118,000 copies in the U.S. and over 250,000 copies worldwide as of 2005. In Esthero's native country of Canada, the album sold over 50,000 copies and was certified Gold. "Heaven Sent" and "That Girl" received significant play on Canadian television (namely the music channel MuchMusic), and also received some airplay on MTV. "Heaven Sent" reached number 27 on MTV's most-played videos chart.

== Singles ==
"Heaven Sent" was released as the album's first official single. It was released as a double A-side CD single with "Breath from Another". A music video was shot and received MTV airplay. The single charted at number 4 on Billboard's Hot Dance Breakout Maxi-Singles Sales. "That Girl" was slated to be the album's second official single, but was never officially released commercially. It was released as the album's second promotional single instead. The accompanying music video was added to rotation on MuchMusic in June 1999, and to rotation on MTV2 the following month. The music video was filmed in Toronto by director Patrick Hoelck.

== Uses in media ==
The title track was featured on the CMJ New Music Monthly February 1998 promotional CD. "Lounge" appears on the soundtrack to film Zero Effect (1998). The remix of "Country Livin' (The World I Know)" featuring dirty south hip hop quartet Goodie Mob was included on the Slam (1998) soundtrack. Tracks "Anywayz" and "That Girl" were used in films Boiler Room (2000) and I Still Know What You Did Last Summer (1998) respectively.

== Track listing ==
Breath from Another track listing
No.	Title	Writer(s)	Producer(s)	Length
1.	"Breath from Another"	Esthero, Doc McKinney	Esthero, Doc	4:47
2.	"Heaven Sent"	Esthero, Doc	Doc	4:30
3.	"Anywayz"	Esthero, Doc	Esthero, Doc	3:54
4.	"That Girl"	Esthero, Doc	Esthero, Doc	4:41
5.	"Country Livin' (The World I Know)"	Esthero, Doc	Esthero, Doc	4:20
6.	"Flipher Overture"	Doc	Doc	0:42
7.	"Half a World Away"	Esthero, Doc	Esthero, Doc	4:18
8.	"Lounge"	Esthero, Doc	Esthero, Doc	4:58
9.	"Superheroes"	Esthero, Doc	Esthero, Doc	3:58
10.	"Indigo Boy"	Esthero, Doc	Esthero, Doc	4:19
11.	"Swallow Me" (with 5 minutes silence following)	Esthero, Doc	Esthero, Doc	6:06
12.	"Anywayz, pt. 2" (hidden track)	Esthero, Doc	Esthero, Doc	4:40
13.	"Wish You Away" (Japanese/25th Anniversary Edition Vinyl bonus track)	Esthero	—	2:49
Total length:				56:13

== Personnel ==
- Esthero – producer, string arrangements, vocals
- Martin "Doc" McKinney – engineer, horn arrangements, producer, programming, string arrangements
- A'ba-Cus – drum programming, engineer, programming
- Evan Cranley – trombone
- Zoren Gold – design, photography
- Dave Gouveia – percussion
- Jeff Griffin – mixing assistant
- Gene Grimaldi – mastering
- Rami Jaffee – optigan
- Tyson Kuteyi – engineer, scratching
- Oscar "DJ Grouch" Betancourt – scratching
- Oscar MacDonald – keyboards
- Mary Maurer – art direction, design
- Tristin Norwell – mixing engineer
- Ray Parker – conductor, string arrangements
- Dave Pensado – mixing
- Jason Ray – drums, toms
- Warren Riker – mixing
- Eddy Schreyer – mastering
- Tom Szczesniak – conductor, string arrangements
- David E. Williams – keyboards
- Malik Worthy – bass
