= BEP Empire/Get Original =

Single by Black Eyed Peas

from the album Bridging the Gap
- Released: August 8, 2000
- Recorded: 2000
- Genre: Alternative hip-hop
- Length: 4:39 ("BEP Empire"); 2:52 ("Get Original")
- Label: Interscope
- Songwriters: ("BEP Empire") William Adams, Allan Pineda, Jaime Gomez, Charles Stewart, George Pajon, Jr., Clifford Smith, Aldane Browne
- Producer: will.i.am ("Get Original") / DJ Premier ("BEP Empire")

Black Eyed Peas singles chronology
"Karma" (1999)	"BEP Empire/Get Original" (2000)	"Weekends" (2000)

"BEP Empire/Get Original" is a double A-side and the first single taken from the album Bridging the Gap by the Black Eyed Peas. It reached number 44 in the US Hot Rap Singles chart.

== Music videos ==
=== "BEP Empire" ===
The concept of the music video is an infomercial advertising a fictional "Discover Hip Hop Set". A different version of the song was also produced in collaboration with the band 311, released on 311's official website as a free download. An extended infomercial parody was also released on a promotional site for the single and later on the Black Eyed Peas website.

=== "Get Original" ===
The music video for "Get Original" was set in an empty canyon. Black Eyed Peas are seen singing and break dancing in the video. Chali 2na is not featured in the video, however Taboo raps a verse in his place.

== Track listing ==
Side A

1. "BEP Empire" (radio edit)
2. "BEP Empire" (album version)
3. "BEP Empire" (instrumental)

Side B

1. "Get Original" (radio edit)
2. "Get Original" (album version) (featuring Chali 2na)
3. "Get Original" (instrumental)
