= Balmes (A Better Life) =

Single by Ian Pooley featuring Esthero

from the album Since Then
- Released: September 14, 2001
- Recorded: 2000
- Genre: Dance; house
- Length: 3:39 (single version); 6:52 (album version)
- Label: V2 Records
- Songwriter(s): Ian Pooley

Ian Pooley singles chronology
"900 Degrees" (2000)	"Balmes (A Better Life)" (2001)	"The Fly Shuffle" (2001)

Esthero singles chronology
"Weekends" (2000)	"Balmes" (2001)	"O.G. Bitch" (2004)

"Balmes (A Better Life)" is a house song by German DJ Ian Pooley. Although an instrumental version of the song was featured on his 2001 album, Since Then, the single version includes vocals from Canadian singer/songwriter Esthero. The single version was released in 2001, with an accompanying animated music video.

Upon its release, the song was successful. It was a modest hit in the United Kingdom, where it became Pooley's second Top 75 hit and Esthero's first. The song became Pooley's second-highest peaking chart entry in the UK, and is today his third-highest peaking. The song was also successful on the US Dance Club Songs chart, on which it peaked at number 34 and gave Pooley his only American chart entry to date. It also became Esthero's highest-peaking single on the US dance chart until "O.G. Bitch," which topped the chart 3 years later.

== Background ==
=== Composition ===
The song, which is done in filtered house style, includes flamenco guitars. The song also features a plucked acoustic guitar. Canadian singer/songwriter Esthero provides vocals for the single version of the song.

=== Release ===
Two versions of the song exist: an instrumental version, which was included on his 2001 album Since Then; and a single version, which was successful in the United States and the United Kingdom, and featured vocals from Canadian singer/songwriter Esthero. The single version was also featured as a hidden track on some editions of Since Then. A VHS single, featuring the song's music video, also received limited release.

== Reception ==
=== Critical ===
Billboard's Michael Paoletta praised the song as "a fine merging" of house and flamenco guitars, also calling Esthero's vocals "sublime" and adding that the song is "perfect for beach-front, sunset soirees, peak-hour dancefloor action, or 'back to mine' interludes." He also praised Faze Action's "Never Coming Home" remix of the song.

=== Commercial ===
The song was modestly successful, charting in the US and the UK. In the UK, "Balmes" debuted on the Official Singles Chart at number 65, on the chart dated November 8, 2001. The following week, it slid to number 95, then off of the chart completely. Upon its release, the song became Esthero's only charting single in the UK, and Ian Pooley's second-highest-peaking single. It remains his third highest-peaking single in that country; his only higher-peaking singles are "900 Degrees," which reached number 57, and "Piha," which reached peaked at number 53.

The song was also a minor hit in the US, going into rotation on WENU, a college radio station, and entering the American Dance Club Songs chart. The song debuted on the Dance Club Songs chart dated September 8, 2001, at number 50. It spent a total of 8 weeks on the chart, peaking at number 34. It remained Esthero's highest-peaking song on the chart until "O.G. Bitch" topped the chart three years later.

== Music video ==
=== Background ===
In June 2001, an accompanying music video, directed by Max Zimmerman and with production by German producers Fiftyeight, was released. It featured an animated Esthero singing the song, and a man falling asleep in a house, which floats off the ground. The video also features imagery of a dirigible floating through a city.

=== Release ===
A VHS single of the song received release in the UK. The video went into rotation on Kiss TV, a Spanish music video channel.

== Track listing ==
CD Single

1. Balmes (A Better Life) (Single Edit) — 3:46
2. Balmes (A Better Life) (Never Coming Home Vocal Remix) — 7:04
3. Balmes (Original Album Version) — 6:56

== Charts ==
Chart (2001)	Peak position
UK Singles (Official Charts Company)	65
US Dance Club Songs	34
