= Pasha Shapiro =

- Pasha Shapiro at 2008 Cannes Film Festival

Background information
- Occupation: Music video director

Pasha Shapiro (Pavel Shapiro) is an American graphic designer and music video director, best known for his work with the musician Will.i.am and his hip hop group Black Eyed Peas.

Video "Smile Mona Lisa" co-created by Pasha Shapiro was presented in Musee Du Louvre in Paris

Animated VR feature "Masters Of The Sun" Created by Shapiro in collaboration with Ernst Weber and will.i.am was selected by 2018 Sundance Film Festival as part of New Frontier program.

== Career ==
Pasha began his career as an Art Director for the National TV in Saint Petersburg, Russia. This position put him in contact with Russian film directors, and soon he was involved in motion picture design. Later, Pasha started partnering with his classmate Ernst Weber, and their friendship turned into a stable professional tandem. Between 1996 and 1997 Pasha moved to the USA. Pasha worked for several years in the field of advertising, producing campaigns and websites for famous brands such as Adidas and EA Sports. The tandem Shapiro-Weber also came up with a short animation story “Unpredictable Behavior” based on Arthur Conan Doyle’s characters of Sherlock Holmes and Doctor Watson. The cartoon, also premiered at the Cannes Festival and was nominated for Best Short Film at the 2008 Anima Mundi International Festival in Brazil. He was also approached by American artist Will.I.Am, and they collaborated for the production of art installations, TV commercials and music videos. One of Shapiro’s installations, Pyramidi, was exhibited in London and later toured art museums in Los Angeles, Stockholm, Istanbul and Athens. Pasha has also directed music videos for Wiz Khalifa, Miley Cyrus, French Montana and Anja Nissen.

== Controversies ==
In 2015, Erykah Badu claimed that Shapiro-directed video for the newest song of the Black Eyed Peas “Yesterday” had borrowed its main idea from her 2008 MTV Video Music Awards winning clip “Honey”. However, the dispute was restricted to the online and social media space and no further comments were issued on either side.
