= O.G. Bitch =

Single by Esthero
- B-side: "I Love You"
- Released: 2004
- Recorded: 2003–2004
- Genre: House; trip hop
- Length: 4:26
- Label: Reprise
- Songwriter(s): Esthero
- Producer(s): Track & Field

Esthero singles chronology
| "Balmes (A Better Life)" (2001) | "O.G. Bitch" (2004) | "We R in Need of a Musical Revolution" (2005) |

"O.G. Bitch" (short for "Original Bitch") is a song by Canadian singer/songwriter Esthero. It reached number 1 on the American Dance Club Songs chart.

== Composition ==
The song is classified as a house song. Lyrically, the song details a woman who acts inauthentic.

== Release ==
The song was released in Canada and the United States as a CD single that included several remixes of the song, in addition to a B-side entitled "I Love You." The single was also released as a 12" record, featuring the original version of the song and an instrumental version.

== Commercial performance ==
Upon its release, "O.G. Bitch" became Esthero's highest-charting song on two Billboard charts, and became one of the biggest Dance Club hits of 2004. "O.G. Bitch" spent 15 weeks on Billboard's Dance Club Songs (previously called the Hot Dance Music/Club Play chart) chart, reaching number 1. It was her first and only song to reach the summit of that chart. Additionally, the song reached number 8 on the American Dance Singles Sales chart.

== Charts ==
=== Weekly charts ===
| Chart (2004) | Peak position |
|---|---|
| US Dance Club Songs | 1 |
| US Dance Singles Sales | 8 |

=== Year-end chart ===
| Chart (2003) | Peak position |
|---|---|
| US Dance Club Songs | 8 |
