= Weekends (Black Eyed Peas song) =

Single by Black Eyed Peas featuring Esthero

from the album Bridging the Gap
- B-side: "Empire Strikes Black"; "Magic"; "Joints & Jam"; "BEP Empire"; "Get Original"
- Released: August 29, 2000
- Recorded: 2000
- Genre: Alternative hip-hop; funk; R&B
- Length: 4:47
- Label: Interscope
- Songwriter(s): Will Adams; Allan Pineda; Jaime Gomez; Tony Butler; Sylvester Stewart
- Producer(s): will.i.am

Black Eyed Peas singles chronology
"BEP Empire/Get Original" (2000)	"Weekends" (2000)	"Request + Line" (2001)

Esthero singles chronology
"That Girl" (1999)	"Weekends" (2000)	"Balmes (A Better Life)" (2001)

"Weekends" is a song recorded by American group Black Eyed Peas for their second studio album Bridging the Gap (2000). It features vocals from Canadian singer Esthero. The song was released as the second single from Bridging the Gap on August 29, 2000, by Interscope Records. A modest commercial success, it peaked at number 73 on the US Hot R&B/Hip-Hop Songs.

== Background ==
A remix of the song was featured on the deluxe edition of the group's fifth studio album, The E.N.D. The song samples the intro of "Family Affair" by Sly & the Family Stone, while the intro samples "Lord of the Golden Baboon" by Mandrill. The song's chorus is an interpolation of the chorus to Debbie Deb's "Lookout Weekend". This was the last single they released before Kim Hill left the group.

== Music video ==
The video starts with members of the band at a work place. and continues by showing the band leaving. Arriving home, they start planning what they are going to do at the weekend. This is later followed by scenes of the band at a party. Cameos in the video include Esthero, Blood of Abraham and Kim Hill.

== Track listings and formats ==
Australian maxi CD single

1. "Weekends" – 4:47
2. "Empire Strikes Black" – 3:53
3. "Magic" – 3:58
4. "Joints & Jam" (The Billion Mix) – 3:23
5. "Weekends" (live) – 5:43
6. "BEP Empire" (music video)

European maxi CD single

1. "Weekends" – 4:47
2. "Empire Strikes Black" – 3:53
3. "Magic" – 3:58
4. "BEP Empire" (music video)

== Charts ==
Weekly chart performance for "Weekends"
Chart (2000–2001)	Peak position
Australia (ARIA)	93
Germany (GfK)	100
US Hot R&B/Hip-Hop Songs (Billboard)	73
US Hot Rap Songs (Billboard)	34

== Release history ==
Release dates and formats for "Weekends"
Region	Date	Format(s)	Label(s)	Ref.
United States	August 29, 2000	Rhythmic contemporary radio; urban contemporary radio	Interscope	
United States	October 3, 2000	12-inch vinyl	Interscope	
Australia	June 11, 2001	Maxi CD	Universal Music	
