= We R in Need of a Musical Revolution =

2004 song performed by Esthero

Single by Esthero

from the album We R in Need of a Musical Revolution and Wikked Lil' Grrrls
- B-side: "I Drive Alone"
- Released: November 23, 2004
- Recorded: 2004
- Genre: Dance; pop rock
- Length: 4:06
- Label: Reprise
- Songwriters: Esthero; Jully Black
- Producer: Adam 12

Esthero singles chronology
"O.G. Bitch" (2004)	"We R in Need of a Musical Revolution" (2004)	"Fastlane" (2005)

"We R in Need of a Musical Revolution" is a song by Canadian singer/songwriter Esthero. It was released as part of a six-song EP in November 2004 and was also featured on her 2005 album Wikked Lil' Grrrls. The song lyrically explores the lack of originality in current popular music, decrying several popular performers, including Ashanti and Britney Spears.

Upon its release, the song received almost unanimous praise from critics, who compared Esthero's vocal performance to Björk's and praised the track's outspokenness and production. An accompanying music video was shot in Toronto and released, receiving play on MuchMusic.

The eponymous EP featured collaborations with Sean Lennon and CeeLo Green, which would later be featured on Wikked Lil' Grrrls. These tracks garnered unanimous praise from critics, who praised the release's eclecticism and regarded the title track as a highlight.

== Background and writing ==
Esthero had been dropped from WORK in 1999, when it was absorbed into Epic Records. She subsequently signed with Reprise Records and worked on a number of collaborations and soundtrack contributions before commencing recording for her second album in the early 2000s. Due to a series of delays, "We R In Need of a Musical Revolution" wasn't released until late 2004, making some of the lyrics sound dated. In an interview with The Washington Post, she stated that "When I wrote it, the Ashanti comment ("No matter where I go, I see Ashanti on the video screen") was relevant," but that "by the time we mixed (the song), I was secretly hoping she would resurface with something so that my statement would be relevant!" Ashanti returned to the spotlight as a spokeswoman for Herbal Essence, and Esthero admits that "Secretly I was going, 'Yes, now my song makes sense!'"

Esthero told Billboard that she chose to have the song as the opening track on Wikked Lil' Grrrls because it "made everything make sense. I felt that if I make it the first track on the record, people would understand why I do so much genre-hopping and why the album is so manic. It just puts a nice little bow on the record."

== Composition ==
Lyrically, the song explores the lack of originality in current popular music. Esthero references a number of musicians and pop-culture events in the song. Some of these include:

- Ashanti ("No matter where I go, I see Ashanti in the video")
- MTV ("And MTV they only play the same thing")
- Britney Spears ("No matter where I go, I see Britney on my video screen")
- R. Kelly ("Tell me why a grown man can rape a little girl, but we still hear his shit on our radio")

== Critical reception ==
The song garnered mostly favorable reviews from music critics, with many comparing the song to Björk's music. Johnny Loftus, writing for AllMusic, felt that the song was a highlight of both the EP and the album and stated that the song "updates the sound of Esthero's 1998 debut with propulsive programming and more Björk in her vocal than ever before." Mark Saleski, writing for Blog Critics, was similarly-positive, calling the song "sassy" and "funny". Slant Magazine's Sal Cinquemani likewise praised the track, commenting that its lyrics "justly lambaste radio for its repetitive playlists and MTV for what they're now calling the 'Big 10.'"

However, Annie Zaleski, writing for the Cleveland Scene, held the opposite view. She felt that the song was the weakest track on the EP, calling it "weak" and "whiny".

== Music video ==
A music video, directed by Noble Jones, was released, and features Esthero destroying televisions and performing on a busy street. The city and street scenes were shot in Toronto, Ontario. The video premiered in June 2005, and aired on MuchMusic.

== EP ==
We R In Need Of A Musical ReVoLuTIoN!

EP by Esthero
- Released: November 23, 2004
- Recorded: 2003–2004
- Genre: Electronica; R&B; jazz; pop
- Length: 29:15
- Label: Reprise
- Producer: Esthero; Kamillion; Adam 12; Sean Lennon; Keith Crouch; James Robertson; Henry Priestman; Paul Campbell

Professional ratings
Review scores
Source	Rating
AllMusic	3.5/5 stars
BlogCritics	Very favorable
Cleveland Scene	Favorable

A six-track EP of the same name was released by Reprise to promote the song, and in anticipation of her second full-length album, which the label predicted would be released in early 2005. The title track, along with "Everyday Is a Holiday (with You)" and "Gone", were later included on her second full-length album, Wikked Lil' Grrrls.

No.	Title	Length
1.	"We R In Need of A Musical Revolution!"	4:04
2.	"Everyday is a Holiday (with You)" (feat. Sean Lennon)	4:02
3.	"Gone" (feat. CeeLo Green)	5:11
4.	"This Lull-a-Bye"	5:30
5.	"I Drive Alone"	3:40
6.	"Amber and Tiger's Eye" (bonus track)	7:28
Total length:		29:15

=== Critical reception ===
The EP garnered highly positive reviews. AllMusic notes the EP as a career highlight for Esthero. Allmusic's Johnny Loftus awarded the EP three and a half out of five stars, likening Esthero's vocal performance to Bjork's and praising the EP's stylistic range, noting "Gone" as the EP's best song. Annie Zaleski, writing for Cleveland Scene, was also positive, commenting that the EP demonstrates Esthero's "musical growth" and noting the album's stylistic eclecticism. She had mixed feelings, however, regarding the title track, and commented that "tidying up her once-messy mash-ups produces songs that just aren't very interesting."
