= Ian Pooley =

German record producer and DJ (born 1973)

- Pooley in 2011

Background information
- Born: Ian Pinnekamp; 1973 (age 52–53); Germany
- Genre: House
- Occupations: Record producer, DJ
- Years active: 1993–present
- Spouse: Eva Pinnekamp
- Website: ianpooley.com

Ian Pinnekamp (born in 1973), better known by his stage name Ian Pooley, is a German record producer and DJ. While incorporating samples of various musical genres, Pooley's creations are usually classified as house, French house, or tech house with Brazilian influence.

== Biography ==
Pooley's music career began in 1993. Fascinated by producers in Chicago and Detroit, he brought his first machines and immediately started writing house and techno music, which kickstarted a multi-decade-spanning career playing to hugely diverse audiences. In 1998, Pooley made his sole appearance on the prestigious BBC Radio One's Essential Mix, which featured tracks by Slam, Jeff Mills and his own productions. After a long stretch with V2 Records, in which Pooley released several very successful albums (Meridian and Since Then), Pooley left V2 and started his own record company, Pooled Music, in 2003.

Ian Pooley has also cited on various albums (such as Brazilution 5.3 and Souvenirs) that he had an audible 'click' when listening to Brazilian music at a night club. As such, a lot of his music has a noticeable Brazilian flavor to it. He has incorporated artists like Rosanna and Zelia and veteran musician Marcos Valle in some of his works.

In addition to original works, Pooley has remixed artists such as Deee-Lite, The Cardigans, Daft Punk, Cirque du Soleil, Carl Cox and Bob Sinclar.

== Discography ==
=== Albums ===
- 1993 The Latest Adventures of Kool Killer, as Space Cube
- 1995 Relations
- 1996 The Times
- 1998 Meridian
- 1999 The Allnighter/Calypso
- 2000 Since Then
- 2002 The IP Series
- 2004 Souvenirs
- 2005 A Subterranean Soundtrack
- 2008 In Other Words
- 2013 What I Do

=== Singles ===
Ian Pooley

- 1993 "Limited Edition"
- 1994 "Pulse Code EP", as Ian Pooley & Alec Empire (with Alec Empire)
- 1994 "Roller Skate Disco"
- 1994 "Twin Gods EP"
- 1995 "Twin Gods Vol. 2"
- 1995 "Celtic Cross EP"
- 1995 "Celtic Cross Remixes"
- 1995 "My Anthem"
- 1995 "Today"
- 1996 "Chord Memory"
- 1996 "Two Space Cowboys on a [Bad] Trip to Texas", as Ian Pooley & The Jaguar (with Alec Empire)
- 1996 "What's Your Number"
- 1996 "Relations"
- 1997 "Calypso EP"
- 1997 "Gimme Sound"
- 1997 "Higgledy Piggedly"
- 1998 "Followed"
- 1998 "Loopduelle"
- 1998 "Rock Da Discoteque EP"
- 1998 "What's Your Number" (re-release)
- 1999 "Coldwait"
- 2000 "900 Degrees"
- 2000 "Coração Tambor" (with Rosanna & Zélia)
- 2000 "The Allnighter EP"
- 2001 "Balmes (A Better Life)" (with Esthero)
- 2002 "Traffic"
- 2002 "The Fly Shuffle"
- 2002 "Niteflite"
- 2002 "Missing You"
- 2002 "Ready to Flow"
- 2002 "Piha", as Ian Pooley & Magik J (with Magik J)
- 2003 "Here We Go!"
- 2003 "Heke", as Ian Pooley & Magik J (with Magik J)
- 2004 "Searchin'"
- 2004 "Heaven" (with Jade and Danni'elle)
- 2005 "Samo Iluzija"
- 2006 "Higgledy Piggedly 2006"
- 2006 "Celtic Cross 2006"
- 2007 "All Nite"

Ides

- 1994 "Sweet & Sour EP"
- 1996 "Plastered EP"
- 1996 "Elastic EP"
- 1998 "Limer"
- 2005 "Right in the Night EP"

Space Cube
All are collaborations with DJ Tonka

- 1991 "Space Cube EP"
- 1991 "Sub Audible"
- 1992 "Kool Killer EP"
- 1992 "Kool Killer Vol. 2"
- 1993 "Kool Killer Vol. 3"
- 1993 "Kool Killer Mixes EP"
- 1993 "Unreleased Project EP"
- 1993 "The Latest Adventures of Kool Killer EP"
- 1994 "Dschungelfieber"
- 1994 "Inbound/Outbound"
- 1995 "Kommerz Killer/Big Bam Bam"
- 1997 "Unreleased Space Cube Tracks"

T'N'I
All are collaborations with DJ Tonka

- 1991 "Low Mass EP"
- 1991 "Trip Men"
- 1991 "Do You Still Care" (with Marie Pullins)
- 1992 "Beam EP"
- 1993 "Depart EP"
- 1993 "Dream Team EP"
- 1993 "I Want To Be Free"
- 1994 "Mad Situation/Be Straight"

Other aliases

- 1991 "Emperor/Daylight", as Outrage (with DJ Tonka)
- 1993 "The Modular", as The Modulor
- 1996 "Next to Nowhere", as Ansicht
- 1996 "Skippin' EP", as John Skipper Trax
- 1996 "Roll With It!", as The Low Frequency Band
- 1996 "Ice Fractions 1", as Silvershower
- 1996 "Ice Fractions 2", as Silvershower
- 1997 "Enlite EP", as Bluelite
- 1999 "Enlite Juice", as Bluelite
- 1999 "Valle Valle!", as Pinnchiky
- 2001 "Viewing a Decade EP", as Quiet Daze
- 2002 "Skippin' EP", as John Skipper Trax (re-release)
