= Jelleestone =

- Born: David Carty
- Origin: Etobicoke, Ontario, Canada
- Genre: Canadian hip hop
- Occupations: Rapper
- Years active: 1997–present
- Labels: Rex Entertainment; Warner Bros.

David Carty, known by his stage name Jelleestone, is a Canadian rapper.

== Early life ==
Originally from the Rexdale neighbourhood in the former city of Etobicoke (now Toronto), Carty spent his childhood living in both Toronto and New York City.

== Career ==
=== Early career ===
He began performing as a rapper with the local Toronto rap groups PNP and ORB, before contributing the solo track "When You're Hot, You're Hot" to the Rudimental compilation in 1997.

=== Commercial breakthrough: "Money" and Jelleestone Thirteen ===
He subsequently recorded his debut album Jelleestone Thirteen, which was produced by Jon Levine of The Philosopher Kings. He was preparing to release the album on his own independent label Rex Entertainment, but began attracting label interest in the United States after Nelly Furtado, who had the same manager, began talking about his work in media interviews. Signed to Warner Bros. Records in 2000, he released Jelleestone Thirteen on the label on August 28, 2001.

The album's single, "Money (Part 1)", was a top 40 hit in Canada, reaching number 6 in September 2001. In a 2005 profile of Jelleestone, Now Toronto quipped that the song was "getting more spins than an amnesiac in a revolving door". The single also experienced some success in the United States. In the July 7, 2001, issue of Billboard magazine, the single received a "critic's choice" designation, with music writer Eric Aiese praising the song's "fun tempo and catchy chorus, not to mention the witty — albeit serious — message" and likening it to rap records of the early 1990s, concluding that it was akin to a Will Smith single "without the namepower". In early July 2001, Billboard reported that the track had gone into rotation on some US radio stations, and in October 2001, it was added to the "Oven Fresh" rotation of music video station MuchMusic USA. It later reached #75 on Billboard's Hot Singles Sales chart. Danish Vice columnist Fritz the Cat ranked the song as one of the best of 2001, behind Mystic's "The Life", while Complex suggested in 2021 that Canadian rapper Drake was "channeling Jelleestone" when he sang that "money can't buy me happiness" on his own song. As of 2014, it remained his sole entry on the US music charts.

In 2001 Jelleestone performed in Charlottetown with Kardinal Offishall, IRS and Rascalz.

He garnered two nominations at the Juno Awards of 2002, for Best New Solo Artist and Best Rap Recording.

=== Later work ===
He won a MuchMusic Video Award for Best Rap Video in 2004 for "Who Dat", a collaboration with Jamaican musician Elephant Man. The track was featured on his second album, The Hood Is Here, released in 2005. The album also featured "Friendamine", a collaboration with Furtado.

In the same year, he also collaborated with Esthero on the song "Fastlane", from her album Wikked Lil' Grrrls.

He also performed as an opening act at a Souls of Mischief Concert in Toronto in August 2026.

== Personal life ==
In June 2003, Carty and his cousin David Gayle were arrested outside The Money nightclub in downtown Toronto, after an altercation in which he was alleged to have threatened another man, during which Gayle was discovered to have a gun hidden in his shoe. Testimony during the trial revealed that the plaintiff, not Carty, had initiated the incident after he felt "brushed off" by Carty, and that Carty had no knowledge of Gayle's gun. Gayle was sentenced to 15 months in jail, while the charges against Carty were dropped.

== Discography ==
Studio albums

- Jelleestone Thirteen (2001)
- The Hood Is Here (2005)
- Original Rude Boy (2025)

Singles

- "Money (Part 1)"
- "Makes The World Go 'Round"
- "Who Dat" (featuring Elephant Man)
- "The Hood Is Here"
- "Friendamine" (featuring Nelly Furtado)
- "I'm With You"
- "Dim Ur Light"
