= Jason Englishman =

- Also known as: J. Englishman
- Born: Jason Daniyel Englishman; December 22, 1971 (age 54); Kingston, Ontario, Canada
- Origin: Toronto, Ontario, Canada
- Genres: Pop; alternative rock; rock
- Occupations: Singer; guitarist; songwriter
- Instruments: Guitar; bass guitar; keyboards
- Years active: 1997–present
- Label: Warner Bros.

Jason Daniyel Englishman (born December 22, 1971 in Kingston, Ontario, Canada) is a Canadian rock music singer and guitarist. His major label debut studio album, Poor L'il Rockstar, was released on Warner Records in 2000, and spawned the four Canadian top 40 singles: "Staring at the Sun", "The One Thing", "Abused" (which was initially banned by video station MuchMusic) and the top ten rock radio hit "More".

He received a 2001 Juno Award nomination for best new solo artist, and in March 2001 the Canadian Association of Broadcasters presented him with the Canadian Radio Music Award for best new solo artist rock/alternative.

In recent years he has toured as the lead guitarist for Sony Canada recording artist Barlow and with his sister, Esthero (also a noted Canadian recording artist). He has produced two albums for Toronto independent band G-13, has lent his guitar work and backing vocals to numerous recordings, and worked for the North by Northeast music festival. He has also worked as a freelance music writer for Chart magazine.

In 2006, he served as Production Manager for John Legend's "Once Again" Tour. From 2006 to 2007, he served as Festival Programmer and Production Manager of the Rock the Wake Festival.

He currently works as an audio engineer and serves as the Warranty Manager at Mercedes-Benz Brampton.
