= Jemeni =

- Birth name: Joanne Gairy
- Born: 1976 (age 48–49); Grenada
- Origin: Toronto, Ontario, Canada
- Genres: Hip-hop, R&B
- Occupation(s): Singer, Actress, Broadcaster
- Years active: 2000-present
- Website: MySpace

Joanne Gairy, better known by her stage name Jemeni, is a singer, actress, writer, activist, broadcaster and community worker. She was born in Grenada and grew up in St. Catharines, Ontario and now lives in Toronto, Ontario, Canada. She studied Radio and Television Arts at Ryerson University (now Toronto Metropolitan University), Toronto.

She is a hip-hop poet, and works in Canadian broadcasting. She was formerly a host on Flow 93.5 FM and volunteered for the Ryerson University campus radio station CKLN-FM. She has also been a music critic on Much Music. The Literature Alive series about Caribbean-Canadian authors (broadcast on Bravo! Television October 6 to December 29, 2005), produced a documentary about Jemeni called Jemeni in the City.

Jemeni has won the Caribbean Women of Excellence Award, the Warning Award, the Tara Award, and the Canadian Urban Music award. She defended Nalo Hopkinson's novel Brown Girl in the Ring for the prestigious CBC Canada Reads book competition in February 2008.

In January 2022, she and Mark Strong joined Toronto radio station CFPT-FM as cohosts of the morning show, three months after leaving CKFG-FM.

As of 2024, Jemeni is host of CBC Music's national R&B-focused radio series Marvin's Room.
