= Esthero =

Canadian singer-songwriter

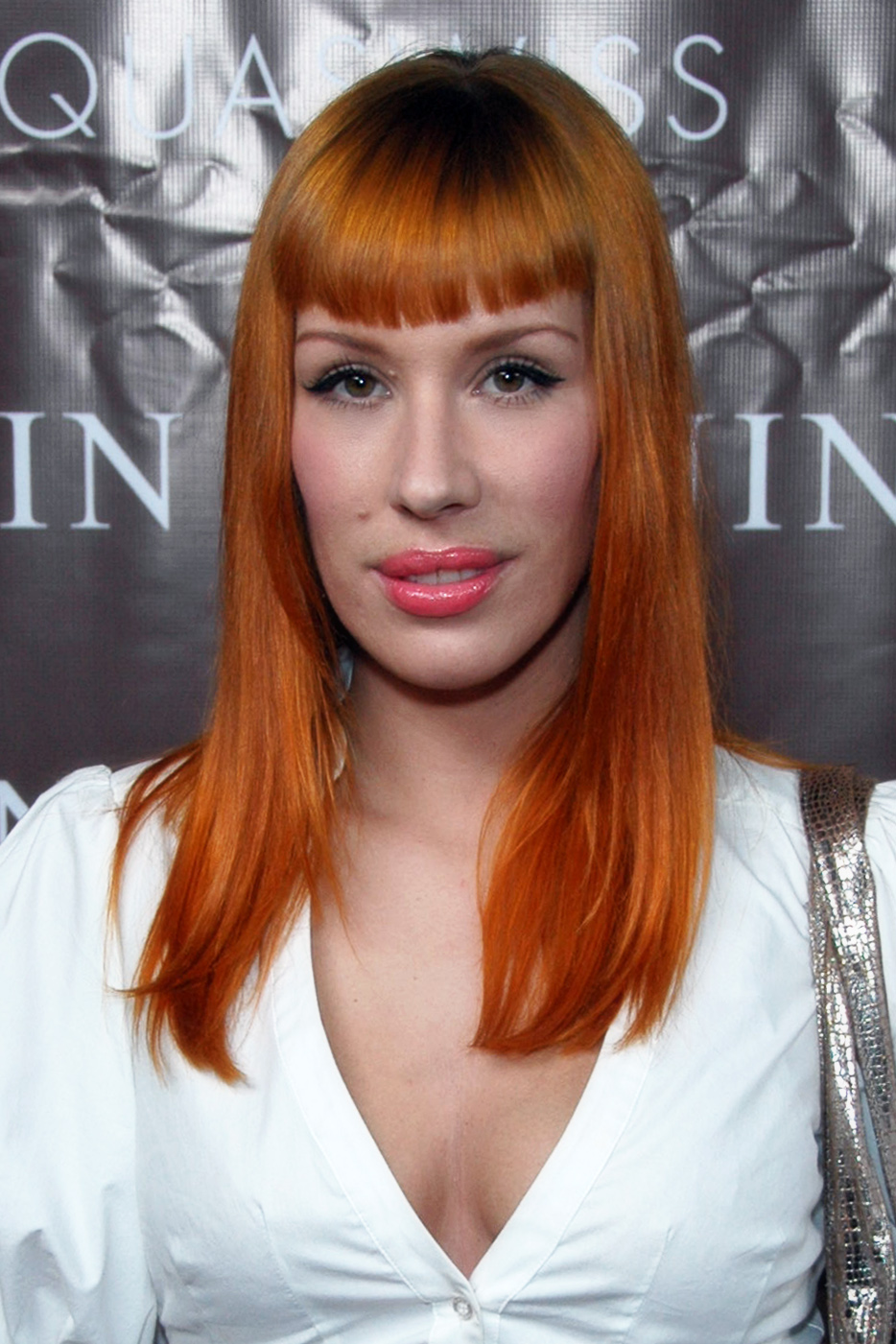
- Esthero in 2008

Background information
- Born: Jenny-Bea Englishman; December 23, 1978 (age 47); Stratford, Ontario, Canada
- Origin: Toronto, Ontario, Canada
- Genres: Electronica; trip hop; R&B; jazz; experimental rock; lounge; indie pop
- Occupations: Singer-songwriter; record producer; arranger; activist
- Years active: 1997–present
- Labels: The WORK Group; Reprise; Universal Canada
- Website: esthero.net

Esthero (/ɛsˈtɛroʊ/ es-TERR-oh; born Jenny-Bea Englishman on December 23, 1978) is a Canadian singer-songwriter who lives in Los Angeles, California. The name Esthero refers both to the singer and formerly to the two-person team of herself and producer Doc McKinney. Esthero is a portmanteau of "Esther the hero"; she claims to have gotten the name by combining the name of the heroine (Esther) and last line ("If I am to be the hero, then I cannot fly from darkness") of the film from Sylvia Plath's only novel, The Bell Jar (1963).

Esthero's sound characteristically features her voice over a mix of mellow bass lines, jazzy trumpets, classical guitar and hip-hop. She is sometimes compared to artists Björk, Portishead, Billie Holiday, and Sade. She has co-produced the majority of the material she performed. Later female artists who count Esthero among their influences include Res, Fergie and fellow Canadian Nelly Furtado.

Esthero's brother, Jason Englishman, is also a musician.

== Career ==
=== Early life ===
At the age of sixteen, Esthero moved from the small town of Walkerton, Ontario on her own to Toronto, Ontario, where she began singing at open-mic nights while supporting herself by working at different jobs. She was seen singing at the Free Times Cafe by manager Beau Ovcaric who set up a showcase for his partner Zack Werner. They introduced her to EMI Publishing Canada president Michael McCarty, whom she charmed so well during their first meeting that without hearing her sing a single note he set up and paid for recording sessions with Martin "Doc" McKinney, a producer, songwriter, guitarist, programmer and engineer.

=== 1997: Breath from Another ===
The young duo quickly began recording together, and six demos in were being courted on the presidency level by almost every major label in the US. Thanks to then EMI publishing US president Rick Krim their demos reached the ears of the heads of the Work Group (a subsidiary of Sony). Their debut album, Breath from Another, was released to critical acclaim in Spring 1998.

=== 1998–2003: Collaborations and success ===
Following the dissolution of the WORK label, Esthero was released from her contract. She signed with Reprise in 2000. In 1998, after a remix of one of her songs ("Country Livin'") was used included on the soundtrack for Slam, many hip-hop and rap artists requested collaborations with her. Some such collaborations were fruitful, such as her work with the Black Eyed Peas on "Weekends", which was an international hit.

In 2001, Esthero collaborated with German producer Ian Pooley on "Balmes (A Better Life)", which reached the Top 75 of the UK Singles chart and gave Esthero her first entry on the US Dance charts.

=== 2004–2005: O.G. Bitch and Wikked Lil Grrrls ===
On April 20, 2004—without Doc's assistance—Esthero released O.G. Bitch, a standalone EP featuring six alternate remixes of the title track, plus the B-side "I Love You". The song topped the club charts in the US. The following year, she released a second EP, titled We R in Need of a Musical Revolution. The EP spawned a hit of the same name and led the way to Esthero's 2005 full-length album on the Warner Bros. label, Wikked Lil' Grrrls, seven years following her debut album, to mixed critical reaction. The album features contributions from Sean Lennon, André 3000, Jemeni, Jelleestone, and Cee-Lo Green of Goodie Mob.

=== 2007–2011: Split from record company and collaborations ===
In 2007, Esthero amicably parted ways with Venus Management. She continues to have a familial bond with Zack and Beau. Esthero is currently self managed.

2008 was an eventful year for Esthero, with a number of high-profile collaborations including the viral sensation "Yes We Can", a song (with accompanying video) inspired by a speech delivered by Barack Obama and produced by will.i.am. Esthero also provided the voice of the spaceship J.A.N.E. on Kanye West's Glow in the Dark tour and appeared on his album 808s & Heartbreak, on which she co-wrote three tracks under her real name. 2008 also saw her take on the role of producer for a track from Dangerous Muse's debut album and a co-writer on Brandy's album Human. She is featured on hip hop music producer Timbaland's 2009 album Shock Value II on the songs "Can You Feel It" and "Undertow" with band The Fray. The latter entered the Billboard Hot 100 at number 100, giving Esthero her only Hot 100 entry in the US.

In 2010, she provided backing vocals for the song "indecision" on Steven Page's album Page One.

=== 2012–present: Everything Is Expensive and "Baby Steps" ===
On June 5, 2012, Esthero released a new single, titled "Never Gonna Let You Go", which was co-written and co-produced with Adam Bravin (She Wants Revenge). The song was featured in the February 21, 2013 episode of the ABC medical drama Grey's Anatomy, titled "This Is Why We Fight". The song reached number 72 on the Canadian Hot 100, giving Esthero her first entry on the chart.

On October 30, 2012, Esthero self-released a new album titled Everything Is Expensive. It debuted at number thirteen on the Billboard Top Heatseekers chart in the US. In Canada, the album was released through Universal Music.

In 2016, "Breath from Another" was nominated for a Polaris Heritage Prize, for best album from 1996 to 2005. The album lost, however, to Arcade Fire's "Funeral" (which won the public vote) and Lhasa de Sela's "La Llorona" (which won the jury vote).

In 2019, Esthero was featured in Black Eyed Peas song "4ever", and was in the accompanying music video, which was published on February 1, 2019. Via social media, Esthero announced the song "Baby Steps" on February 3, 2019.

== Chart history ==
Esthero's singles typically perform well in North America. She has had three songs enter the US Dance Club Songs chart ("Balmes", with Ian Pooley; "O.G. Bitch"; and "Fastlane", with Jemeni & Jelleestone); two of the songs reached the top five of the chart and one, "O.G. Bitch", reached number one. She has also had two entries on the US Dance Singles Sales chart ("O.G. Bitch" and "Fastlane"), both of which reached the top ten. She has had one chart entry in the UK ("Balmes", which broke the Top 75), and one chart entry in her native Canada ("Never Gonna Let You Go", which reached number 72 on their Hot 100 chart).

== Appearances on television and soundtracks ==
Esthero has appeared on the Chris Rock Show, Video on Trial, Jimmy Kimmel Live!, as well as Late Night with Conan O'Brien and Farmclub with The Black Eyed Peas. She has also contributed songs to the films I Still Know What You Did Last Summer, Go, Bounce, Zero Effect, I Think I Love My Wife and Down With Love, as well as the video game 007: Nightfire. Collaborations in which she has participated have appeared in Love & Basketball and Slam.

Her song "Wikked Lil' Grrrls" has also appeared in the film Miss Congeniality 2 and in commercial spots for Sex and the City and Desperate Housewives, on the TV shows Boston Legal, Smallville, and Las Vegas and its soundtrack, and the film John Tucker Must Die.

The song "Black Mermaid" features prominently in the 2018 film Nappily Ever After, a romantic comedy starring Sanaa Lathan, in which Lathan's character sings a verse from the song (at approximately the 55-minute mark), with Esthero's recording appearing in the following scene. The end credits state that "Esthero appears courtesy of her beautiful mother and her own damn self."

== Discography ==
- Breath from Another (1998; The WORK Group)
- Wikked Lil' Grrrls (2005; Reprise)
- Everything Is Expensive (2012; Universal Music Canada)

== See also ==
- Timeline of Billboard number-one dance songs
- List of artists who reached number one on the U.S. Dance Club Songs chart
