= The Voice UK series 13 =

The Voice UK
- Series 13
- Hosted by: Emma Willis
- Coaches: will.i.am; LeAnn Rimes; Sir Tom Jones; Tom Fletcher & Danny Jones
- Winner: AVA
- Winning coach: Tom Fletcher & Danny Jones
- Runners-up: Billy & Louie; Deb Orah; Storry
- No. of episodes: 9

Release
- Original network: ITV1
- Original release: 31 August – 26 October 2024

Series chronology
- ← Previous; Series 12 Next → Series 14

The Voice UK is a British television music competition to find new singing talent. The thirteenth series premiered on 31 August 2024 on ITV1. Emma Willis returned to present the series, whilst will.i.am and Sir Tom Jones returned as coaches, along with The Voice Australia coach LeAnn Rimes, and Tom Fletcher & Danny Jones, with the latter two serving as the programme's first duo coach.

On 26 October 2024, AVA was announced the winner of the series, marking Tom Fletcher & Danny Jones' first and only win as coaches. Fletcher and Jones became the first duo on the UK version of The Voice to win a series and became the third coach to win on their debut series, following Jennifer Hudson and Anne-Marie. It also marks Jones' second win on the UK franchise following the third series of the Kids edition.

== Coaches ==
Coaches for series 13 of The Voice UK

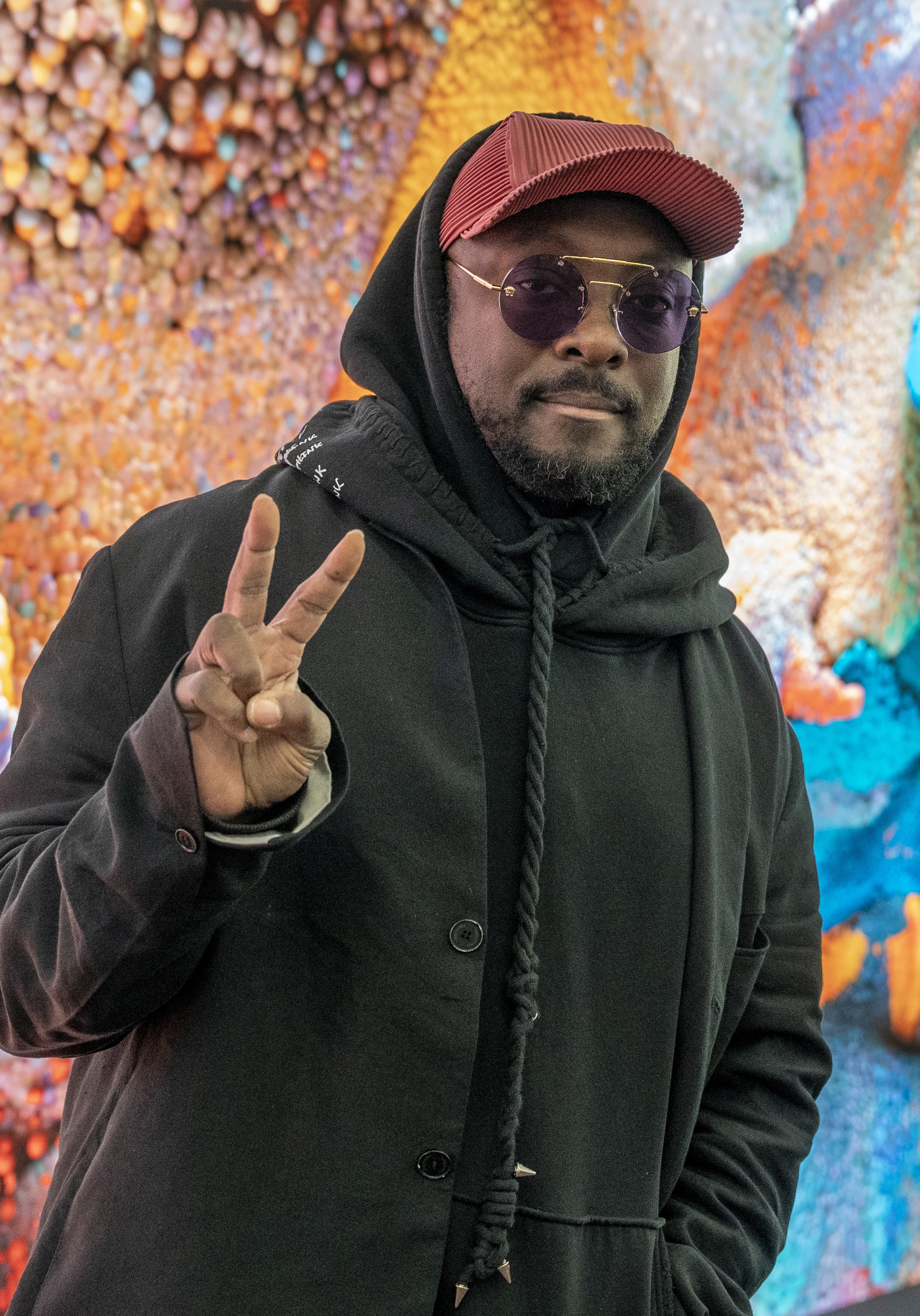
will.i.am

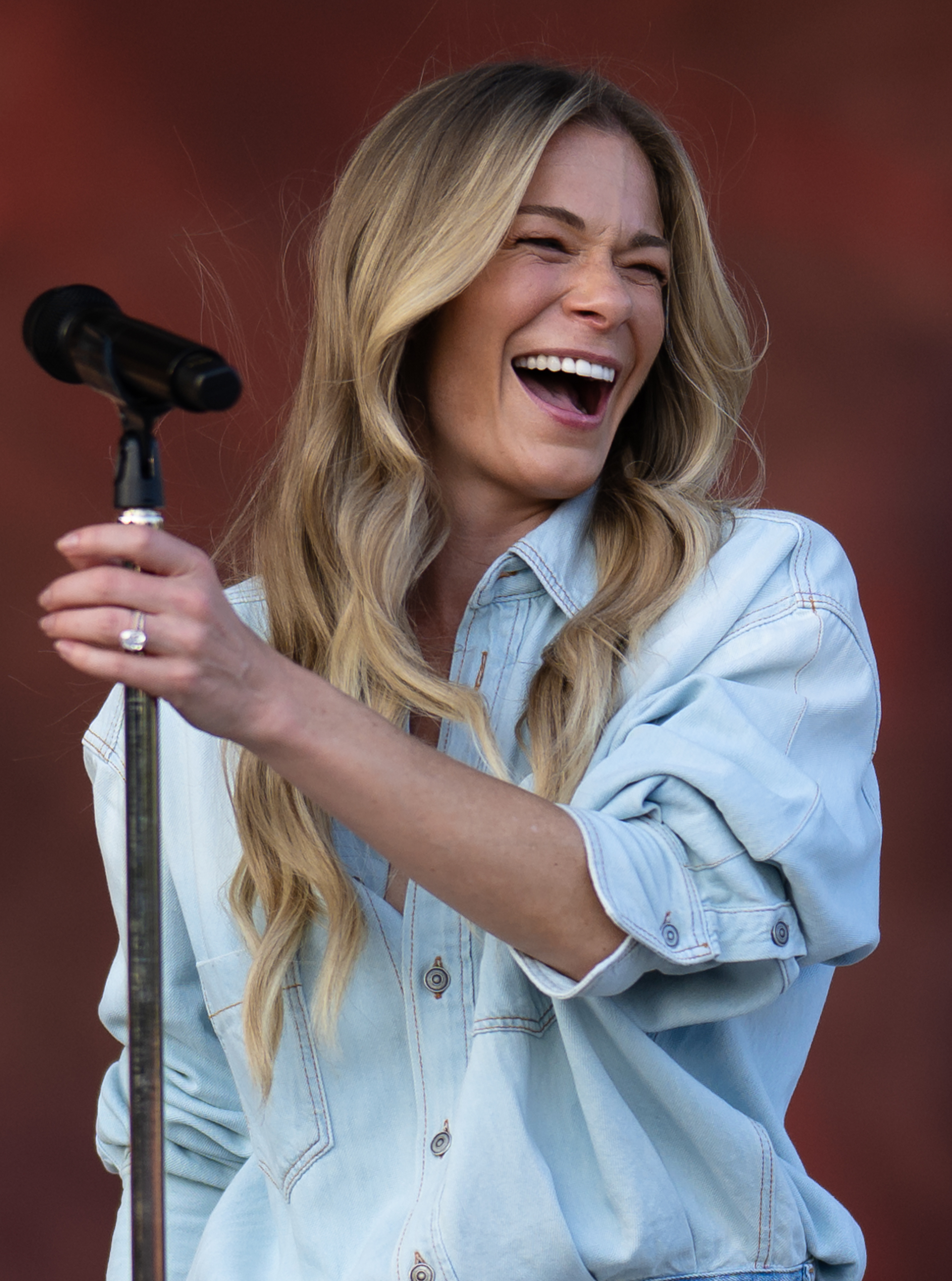
LeAnn Rimes

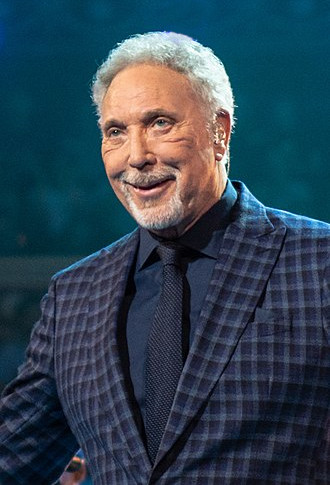
Sir Tom Jones

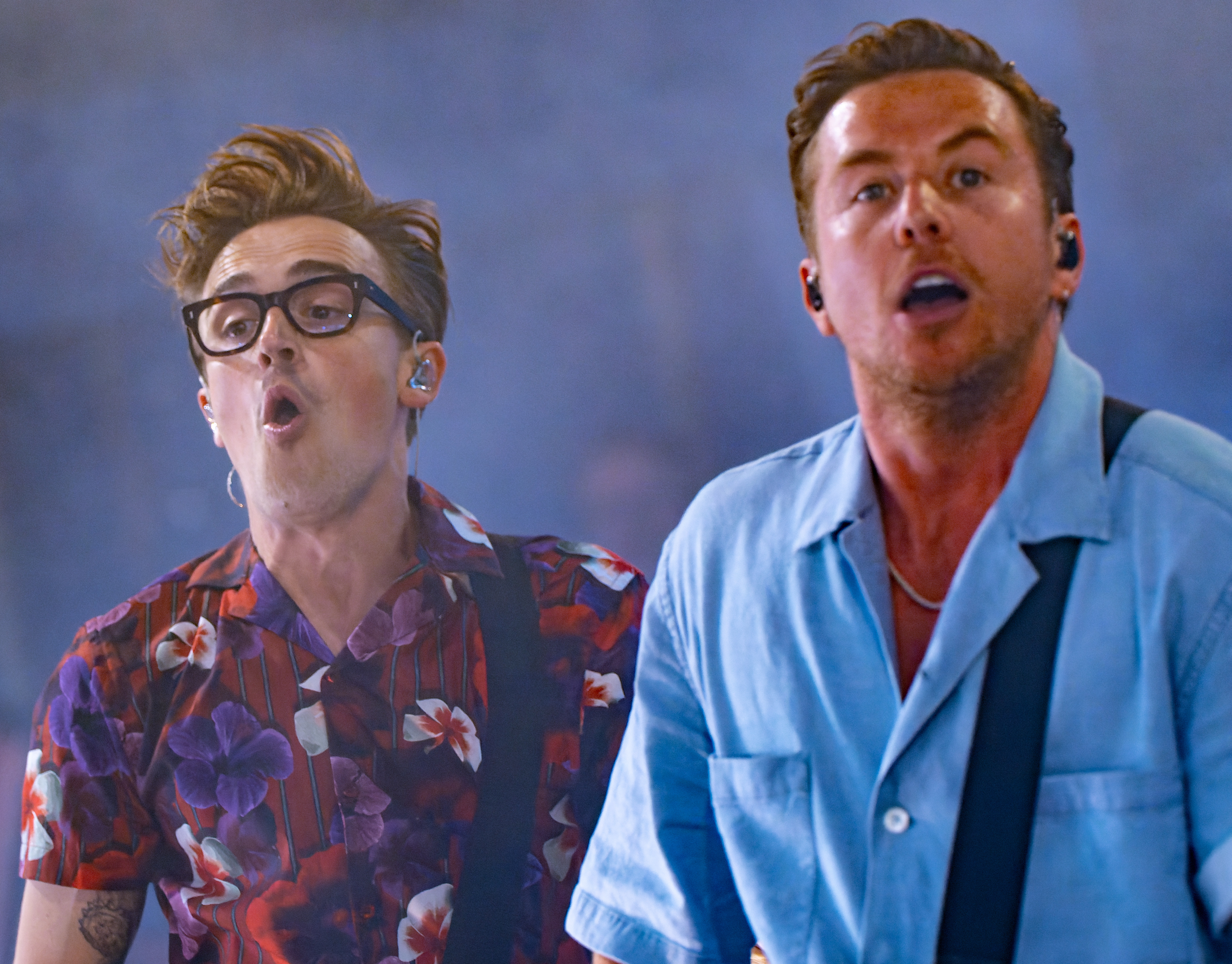
Tom Fletcher & Danny Jones

Prior to the beginning of the previous series, Olly Murs announced that he had been axed from the show, and that the twelfth series would be his last as a coach. The following month, it was announced that Anne-Marie had also been axed from the series with the show's producers reportedly wanting to "refresh the show".

Emma Willis returned for her eleventh series as presenter, whilst will.i.am and Sir Tom Jones returned for their thirteenth and twelfth series as coaches respectively. In February 2024, LeAnn Rimes was announced as Anne-Marie's replacement, whilst Murs was replaced by both McFly singers Tom Fletcher and Danny Jones, the latter of whom served as a coach on the spin-off version The Voice Kids since its inception. The pair made up the show's first ever "double chair", a format that has previously been used in other versions of The Voice franchise, which saw them share the same chair and make decisions throughout the series collaboratively. This also marked the first time since the sixth season to feature two new coaches.

== Production ==
Auditions for the thirteenth series began taking place throughout June and July 2023 with online applications closing in October 2023. The series was again pre-recorded, with filming beginning in February 2024 and concluding in June.

== Teams ==
=== Colour key ===
- Winner
- Runner-up
- Eliminated in the Semi-Final
- Eliminated in the Callbacks
- Withdrew

Coach	Top 40 Artists				
will.i.am					
will.i.am	Storry	ESNCE	MiC LOWRY	Aaliyah Zhané	Amber Drameh
will.i.am	Kevon Bennett	Matty Scott	Olivier	Twin MCS	Alya
LeAnn Rimes					
LeAnn Rimes	Deb Orah	Conor McLoughlin	Lois Morgan Gay	CHLOEJET	Harry James
LeAnn Rimes	Haydn Bardoe	Joy Farrukh	Kailun Dennie	Nathan Grisdale	ONOSE
Sir Tom Jones					
Sir Tom Jones	Billy & Louie	Ace	Hollie Peabody	Aaron Delano	Abdul Omoba
Sir Tom Jones	Eda Nives	Jack McGee	Kealeigh Robertson	Kuill Cameron	Zalika Henry
Tom Fletcher & Danny Jones					
Tom Fletcher & Danny Jones	AVA	Kyra Smith	Olivia Rogers	Bette Reynolds	Billy Lockett
Tom Fletcher & Danny Jones	Calum Jones	James Barlow	Roisin McCarney	Stan Buckroyd	The Twins

== Blind auditions ==
Blind auditions colour key
✔	Coach pressed "I WANT YOU" button
	Artist defaulted to this coach's team
	Artist elected to join this coach's team
	Artist eliminated with no coach pressing their "I WANT YOU" button
	Artist received an "All Turn"

=== Episode 1 (31 August) ===
- Coach performance: "Edge of Midnight (Midnight Sky Remix)"

Order	Artist	Age	Song	Coaches and artists choices			
Order	Artist	Age	Song	will.i.am	LeAnn	Tom J.	Tom F. & Danny
1	MiC LOWRY	28–29	"Just a Friend 2002"	✔	✔	✔	✔
2	Harvey Powell	18	"Unsteady"	—	—	—	—
3	Joy Farrukh	56	"Your Song"	—	✔	—	—
4	Kyra Smith	20	"Golden Slumbers"	—	—	✔	✔
5	Kevon Bennett	32	"I Feel Good"	✔	—	—	—
6	Danielle Maihallet	34	"Ave Maria"	—	—	—	—
7	Zalika Henry	35	"Daylight"	✔	✔	✔	✔
8	Billy Lockett	32	"I Could Use a Friend" (original)	✔	✔	✔	✔

- In Zalika Henry's audition, will.i.am, Sir Tom Jones and Tom & Danny switched seats to Danny Jones, Tom Fletcher and will.i.am & Sir Tom Jones respectively.

=== Episode 2 (7 September) ===
- Coach performance: LeAnn Rimes & Tom Jones — "Let It Be Me"

Order	Artist	Age	Song	Coaches and artists choices			
Order	Artist	Age	Song	will.i.am	LeAnn	Tom J.	Tom F. & Danny
1	Deb Orah	28	"His Eye Is on the Sparrow"	✔	✔	✔	✔
2	Romz	24	"Shake It" (original)	—	—	—	—
3	Kuill Cameron	30	"Don't Give Up"	—	—	✔	—
4	Haydn Bardoe	21	"How Can You Mend a Broken Heart"	—	✔	—	✔
5	Storry	—	"You Don't Know Me (Nah Nah)" (original)	✔	✔	✔	✔
6	Aaron Gardiner	25	"Don't Let the Sun Go Down on Me"	—	—	—	—
7	Lois Morgan Gay	23	"My Mind"	—	✔	—	—
8	AVA	20	"Damn Your Eyes"	✔	✔	✔	✔

=== Episode 3 (14 September) ===
- Coaches performance: "Mama Told Me Not to Come"

Order	Artist	Age	Song	Coaches and artists choices			
Order	Artist	Age	Song	will.i.am	LeAnn	Tom J.	Tom F. & Danny
1	Billy & Louie	20	"Run to You"	✔	✔	✔	✔
2	Paul Connor	18	"Spit of You"	—	—	—	—
3	Amber Drameh	27	"Ex-Factor"	✔	—	—	—
4	Twin MCS	39	"Long Time Coming" (original)	✔	—	✔	✔
5	The Celtic Harps	29–35	"The Irish Rover"	—	—	—	—
6	Nathan Grisdale	29	"I Promise" (original)	—	✔	—	—
7	Calum Jones	23	"Best of You"	—	✔	—	✔
8	Ace	20	"Ain't No Way"	✔	✔	✔	✔

=== Episode 4 (21 September) ===
- Coach performance: Tom Fletcher & Danny Jones — "All About You"

Order	Artist	Age	Song	Coaches and artists choices			
Order	Artist	Age	Song	will.i.am	LeAnn	Tom J.	Tom F. & Danny
1	Kailun Dennie	25	"She's Always a Woman"	—	✔	✔	—
2	Jess Hernandez	22	"On My Love"	—	—	—	—
3	Stan Buckroyd	21	"Vampire"	—	✔	—	✔
4	ESNCE	20	"Water"	✔	—	—	—
5	Eda Nives	26	"Anyone"	—	—	✔	—
6	Tony Henry	63	"Nella Fantasia"	—	—	—	—
7	Olivier	23	"Thriller" (original)	✔	✔	—	—
8	Aaron Delano	25	"I'm Kissing You"	✔	✔	✔	✔

=== Episode 5 (28 September) ===
Order	Artist	Age	Song	Coaches and artists choices			
Order	Artist	Age	Song	will.i.am	LeAnn	Tom J.	Tom F. & Danny
1	Matty Scott	20	"Heartbreak Anniversary"	✔	—	—	—
2	Nyime Awe	36	"Through The Fire"	—	—	—	—
3	Roisin McCarney	28	"Call Me"	—	—	—	✔
4	CHLOEJET	23	"Escapism"	✔	✔	—	—
5	Jack McGee	20	"Yellow"	—	—	✔	—
6	Sinead McElroy	18	"Golden Hour"	—	—	—	—
7	Abdul Omoba	24	"Iron Sky"	—	—	✔	—
8	Bette Reynolds	76	"Rapper's Delight"	—	—	—	✔
9	Conor McLoughlin	27	"I See Fire"	✔	✔	✔	✔

=== Episode 6 (5 October) ===
- Coach performance: LeAnn Rimes — "How Do I Live"

Order	Artist	Age	Song	Coaches and artists choices			
Order	Artist	Age	Song	will.i.am	LeAnn	Tom J.	Tom F. & Danny
1	Aaliyah Zhané	26	"Cuz I Love You"	✔	—	—	✔
2	Iwan Hughes	24	"Strangers"	—	—	—	—
3	Olivia Rogers	18	"Lay All Your Love on Me"	—	—	—	✔
4	ONOSE	26	"Chasing Cars"	—	✔	✔	✔
5	Temi Busari	20	"Toast/Shining" (original)	—	—	—	—
6	Kealeigh Robertson	23	"Train Wreck"	—	—	✔	—
7	Alya	18	"Earned It"	✔	—	—	—
8	The Twins	38	"Don't Let Go (Love)"	Team full	—	—	✔
9	Hollie Peabody	21	"Lose You to Love Me"	Team full	—	✔	—

=== Episode 7 (12 October) ===
Order	Artist	Age	Song	Coaches and artists choices			
Order	Artist	Age	Song	will.i.am	LeAnn	Tom J.	Tom F. & Danny
1	James Barlow	22	"Too Close"	Team full	✔	Team full	✔
2	Harry James	28	"Hold Me Closer"	Team full	✔	Team full	Team full

== Callbacks ==
Guest mentors for series 13 of The Voice UK

AI "Fyilicia" for Team Will

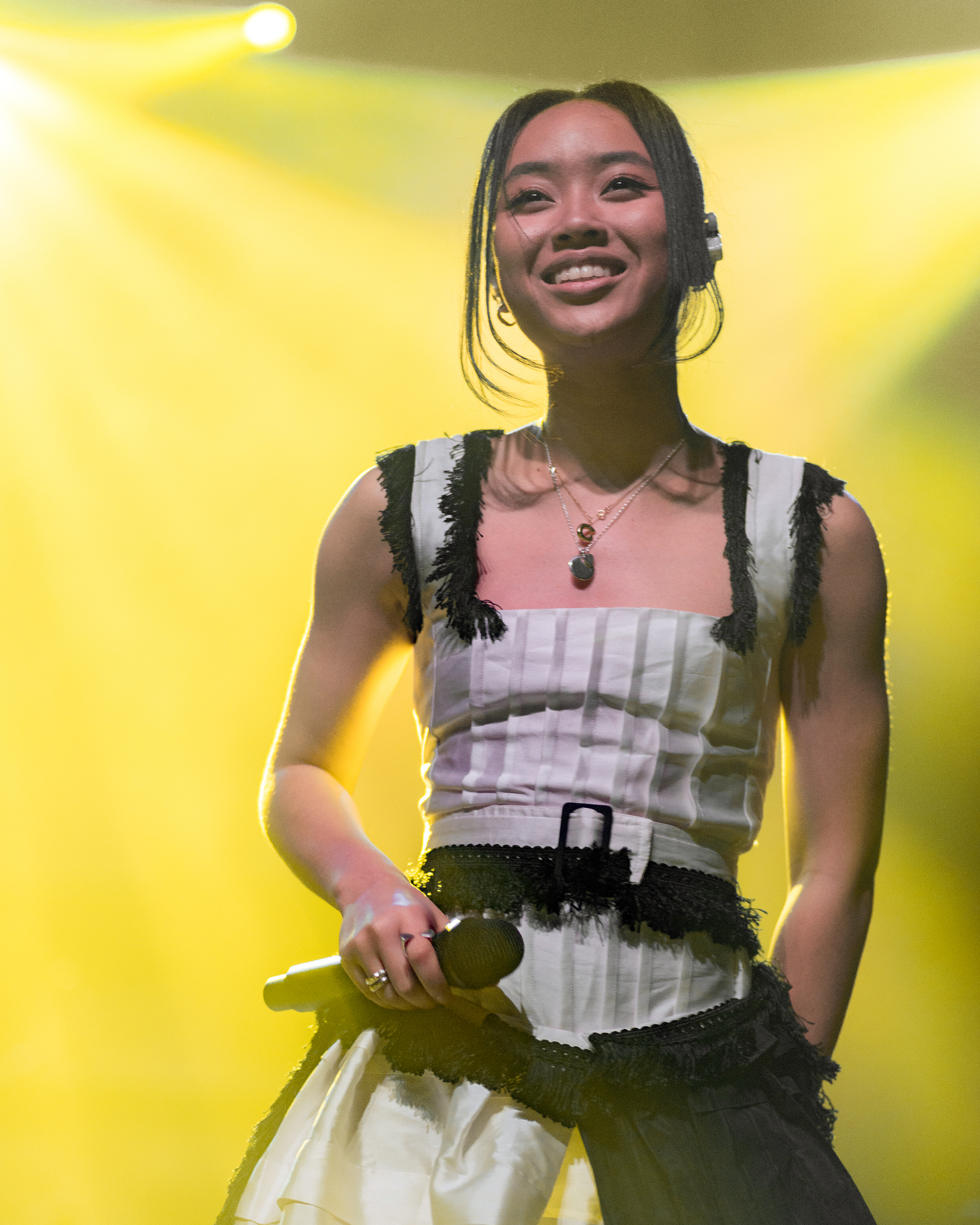
Griff for Team LeAnn

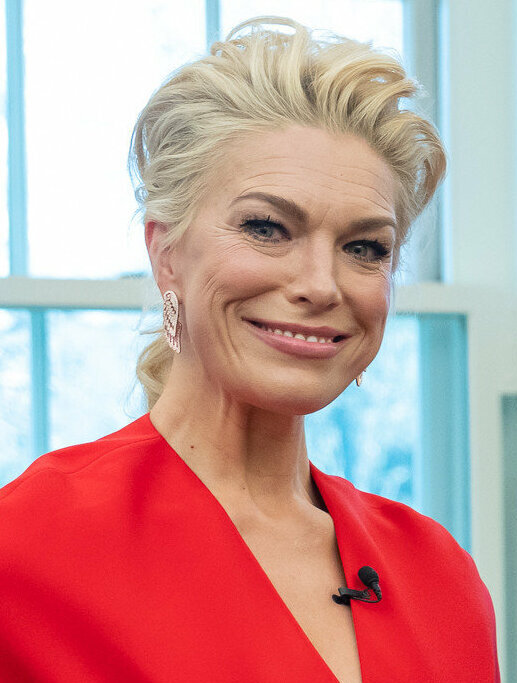
Hannah Waddingham for Team Tom

Perrie Edwards for Team Tom & Danny

For this season, the 'Callbacks' returned. This stage aired on 12 October, following the final round of blind auditions. In this round, each coach brought in a mentor for their team. AI "Fyilicia", Griff, Hannah Waddingham, and Perrie Edwards served as mentors for Teams Will, LeAnn, Tom, and Tom & Danny, respectively. will.i.am became the first coach in the entire franchise of The Voice to feature artificial intelligence as a mentor to a team. Alya from Team Will withdrew from the competition prior to the Callbacks.

In the Callbacks, the coaches divided their 10 contestants selected in the blind auditions into three groups, where they were given the same song to sing in their own styles. After all artists of the same group finished their performances, the coaches had to choose one to advance to the semi-final. A total of three artists were taken through to the semi-final per coach.

This stage of the competition was filmed at St George's Hall in Liverpool.

The Callbacks colour key
Artist advanced to the semi-finals
Artist was eliminated

Callbacks Results
Episode	Order	Coach	Winner	Song	Losers
Episode 7 (12 October)	1	Sir Tom Jones	—N/a	"Used to Be Young"	Zalika Henry
Episode 7 (12 October)	1	Sir Tom Jones	—N/a	"Used to Be Young"	Eda Nives
Episode 7 (12 October)	1	Sir Tom Jones	—N/a	"Used to Be Young"	Kuill Cameron
Episode 7 (12 October)	2	Sir Tom Jones	Hollie Peabody	"Everytime"	Kealeigh Robertson
Episode 7 (12 October)	2	Sir Tom Jones	Hollie Peabody	"Everytime"	Jack McGee
Episode 7 (12 October)	2	Sir Tom Jones	Hollie Peabody	"Everytime"	Abdul Omoba
Episode 7 (12 October)	3	Sir Tom Jones	Billy & Louie	"One Day I'll Fly Away"	Aaron Delano
Episode 7 (12 October)	3	Sir Tom Jones	Ace	"One Day I'll Fly Away"	Aaron Delano
Episode 7 (12 October)	4	will.i.am	MiC LOWRY	"What You Won't Do for Love"	Matty Scott
Episode 7 (12 October)	4	will.i.am	ESNCE	"What You Won't Do for Love"	Matty Scott
Episode 7 (12 October)	5	will.i.am	—N/a	"Murder She Wrote"	Twin MCS
Episode 7 (12 October)	5	will.i.am	—N/a	"Murder She Wrote"	Kevon Bennett
Episode 7 (12 October)	5	will.i.am	—N/a	"Murder She Wrote"	Olivier
Episode 7 (12 October)	6	will.i.am	Storry	"My Song"	Amber Drameh
Episode 7 (12 October)	6	will.i.am	Storry	"My Song"	Aaliyah Zhané
Episode 7 (12 October)	7	Tom & Danny	AVA	"Smells Like Teen Spirit"	Stan Buckroyd
Episode 7 (12 October)	7	Tom & Danny	AVA	"Smells Like Teen Spirit"	Roisin McCarney
Episode 7 (12 October)	8	Tom & Danny	—N/a	"I Heard It Through the Grapevine"	James Barlow
Episode 7 (12 October)	8	Tom & Danny	—N/a	"I Heard It Through the Grapevine"	The Twins
Episode 7 (12 October)	8	Tom & Danny	—N/a	"I Heard It Through the Grapevine"	Bette Reynolds
Episode 7 (12 October)	8	Tom & Danny	—N/a	"I Heard It Through the Grapevine"	Calum Jones
Episode 7 (12 October)	9	Tom & Danny	Kyra Smith	"(Everything I Do) I Do It for You"	Billy Lockett
Episode 7 (12 October)	9	Tom & Danny	Olivia Rogers	"(Everything I Do) I Do It for You"	Billy Lockett
Episode 7 (12 October)	10	LeAnn Rimes	Conor McLoughlin	"Trouble"	Nathan Grisdale
Episode 7 (12 October)	10	LeAnn Rimes	Conor McLoughlin	"Trouble"	Kailun Dennie
Episode 7 (12 October)	11	LeAnn Rimes	—N/a	"Love on the Brain"	ONOSE
Episode 7 (12 October)	11	LeAnn Rimes	—N/a	"Love on the Brain"	CHLOEJET
Episode 7 (12 October)	11	LeAnn Rimes	—N/a	"Love on the Brain"	Harry James
Episode 7 (12 October)	11	LeAnn Rimes	—N/a	"Love on the Brain"	Haydn Bardoe
Episode 7 (12 October)	12	LeAnn Rimes	Lois Morgan Gay	"Nothing Compares 2 U"	Joy Farrukh
Episode 7 (12 October)	12	LeAnn Rimes	Deb Orah	"Nothing Compares 2 U"	Joy Farrukh

== Show details ==
=== Results summary ===
Colour key

Team Will
Team LeAnn
Team Tom
Team Tom & Danny

Result's colour key
Artist received the most public votes
Artist was eliminated

Weekly results
Contestant	Week 1	Week 2
AVA	Safe	Winner
Billy & Louie	Safe	Finalist
Deb Orah	Safe	Finalist
Storry	Safe	Finalist
Ace	Eliminated	Eliminated (Week 1)
Conor McLoughlin	Eliminated	Eliminated (Week 1)
ESNCE	Eliminated	Eliminated (Week 1)
Hollie Peabody	Eliminated	Eliminated (Week 1)
Kyra Smith	Eliminated	Eliminated (Week 1)
Lois Morgan Gay	Eliminated	Eliminated (Week 1)
MiC LOWRY	Eliminated	Eliminated (Week 1)
Olivia Rogers	Eliminated	Eliminated (Week 1)

=== Week 1: Semi-final (19 October) ===
The Semi-final aired on 19 October 2024. The 12 contestants who advanced from the Callbacks competed, with each coach having to select one artist out of three to take through to the final. With the advancements of Deb Orah, Storry, Billy & Louie and AVA, the thirteenth series marks the first time in The Voice UK history where every finalist was originally a four-chair turn in the Blind Auditions.

Performances in the semi-final episode
Episode	Order	Coach	Artist	Song	Result
Episode 8 (19 October)	1	LeAnn Rimes	Deb Orah	"Bridge over Troubled Water"	Saved
Episode 8 (19 October)	2	LeAnn Rimes	Conor McLoughlin	"Better Man"	Eliminated
Episode 8 (19 October)	3	LeAnn Rimes	Lois Morgan Gay	"A Case of You"	Eliminated
Episode 8 (19 October)	4	will.i.am	ESNCE	"We Can't Be Friends (Wait for Your Love)"	Eliminated
Episode 8 (19 October)	5	will.i.am	Storry	"Run" (original)	Saved
Episode 8 (19 October)	6	will.i.am	MiC LOWRY	"The Boy Is Mine"	Eliminated
Episode 8 (19 October)	7	Sir Tom Jones	Ace	"I'd Rather Go Blind"	Eliminated
Episode 8 (19 October)	8	Sir Tom Jones	Hollie Peabody	"I Wanna Dance with Somebody (Who Loves Me)"	Eliminated
Episode 8 (19 October)	9	Sir Tom Jones	Billy & Louie	"Freedom! '90	Saved
Episode 8 (19 October)	10	Tom & Danny	Kyra Smith	"The Impossible Dream (The Quest)"	Eliminated
Episode 8 (19 October)	11	Tom & Danny	Olivia Rogers	"Alone"	Eliminated
Episode 8 (19 October)	12	Tom & Danny	AVA	"God Only Knows"	Saved

=== Week 2: Final (26 October) ===
- Coach performance: "Fortunate Son"
- Musical performance: Perrie — "Forget About Us"; HUNNI — "Heartbeat"

Performances in the final episode
Order	Coach	Artist	First song	Order	Duet (with Coach)	Result
1	LeAnn Rimes	Deb Orah	"Holy Water/Jesus Walks "	7	"Nina Cried Power"	Finalist
2	Sir Tom Jones	Billy & Louie	"Fall on Me"	6	"Farther Along"	Finalist
3	will.i.am	Storry	"Forever Young"	5	"Cry Me a River"	Finalist
4	Tom & Danny	AVA	"The Long and Winding Road"	8	"The Reason"	Winner

== Ratings ==
Episode	Air date	Total viewers (millions)	ITV Weekly rank
Blind Auditions 1	31 August	2.97	10
Blind Auditions 2	7 September	3.20	12
Blind Auditions 3	14 September	2.75	10
Blind Auditions 4	21 September	2.35	11
Blind Auditions 5	28 September	2.91	10
Blind Auditions 6	5 October	2.79	12
Blind Auditions 7 & Callbacks	12 October	2.68	12
Semi Final	19 October	2.54	16
Final	26 October	2.62	13
