= Storry (musician) =

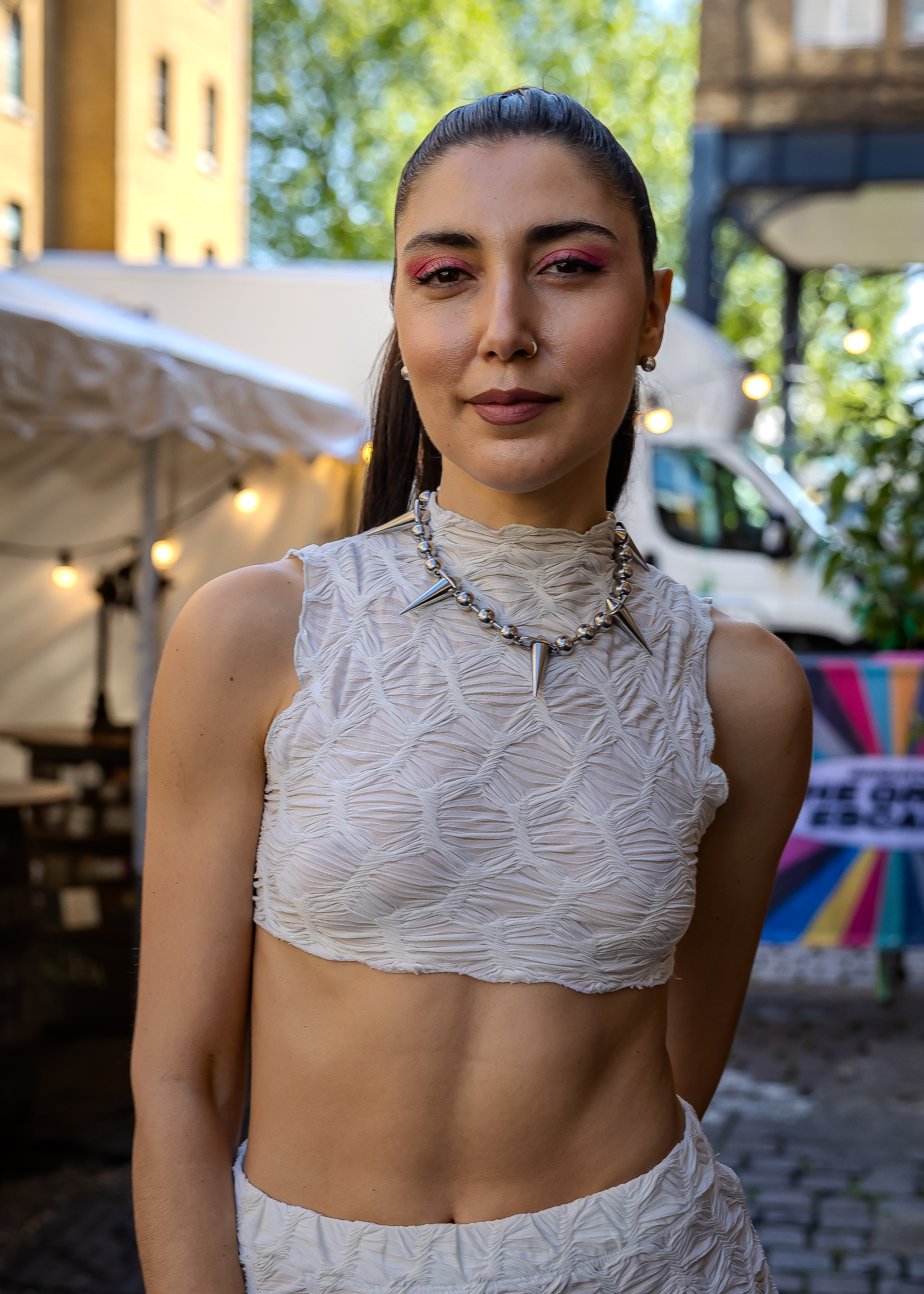
- Storry in 2025

Background information
- Born: Dina Koutsouflakis; Toronto, Ontario, Canada
- Genres: Eclectic R&B, Pop
- Occupations: Singer, Songwriter, Producer, Director, Visual Artist
- Website: https://www.storrymusic.com

Dina Koutsouflakis, known professionally as Storry, is a Canadian singer, songwriter, producer, director, and visual artist. She is a two-time Juno Award nominee, receiving nods for Reggae Recording of the Year at the Juno Awards of 2020 for her single "Another Man", and for Adult Contemporary Album of the Year for her album CH III: The Come Up.

== Life and career ==
Dina Koutsouflakis was born in Canada to Lebanese and Greek parents. Raised in the Rexdale neighbourhood of Toronto, Ontario, she studied opera at Vanier College and shortly at the University of Toronto. At university she was in an abusive relationship, and after studying yoga in India turned to music.

She released CH III: The Come Up, her debut concept album, in February 2020, and followed up in September with the EP Interlude-19.

In 2024, she auditioned for the thirteenth series of The Voice UK. All four coaches, will.i.am, LeAnn Rimes, Tom Jones, and Tom & Danny, "turned their chairs" and expressed interest in working with her. She ultimately chose to be on Team will.i.am. She made it to the finale where she finished as a runner-up.
