= The Voice UK =

British talent competition series

- Genre: Reality competition
- Created by: John de Mol Jr.; Roel van Velzen
- Presented by: Emma Willis; Marvin Humes; Holly Willoughby; Reggie Yates
- Judges: will.i.am; Jessie J; Sir Tom Jones; Danny O'Donoghue; Kylie Minogue; Ricky Wilson; Rita Ora; Paloma Faith; Boy George; Jennifer Hudson; Gavin Rossdale; Olly Murs; Meghan Trainor; Anne-Marie; LeAnn Rimes; Tom Fletcher & Danny Jones; Kelly Rowland
- Composer: Martijn Schimmer
- Country of origin: United Kingdom
- Original language: English
- No. of series: 14
- No. of episodes: 178

Production
- Production locations: BBC Television Centre (2012); Fountain Studios (2013); Elstree Studios (2014–2017, 2021–present); Dock10 (2013–present); LH2 Studios (2018–2020)
- Running time: 30–130 minutes
- Production companies: Talpa (2012–2019); Wall to Wall (2012–2017); ITV Studios Entertainment (2018–2021); Lifted Entertainment (2021–present)

Original release
- Network: BBC One
- Release: 24 March 2012 – 9 April 2016
- Network: ITV1
- Release: 7 January 2017 – present

Related
- The Voice (franchise); The Voice Kids

The Voice UK is a British singing reality competition television series. Created by John de Mol Jr. and Roel van Velzen, it premiered on BBC One on 24 March 2012. Based on the original Dutch singing competition The Voice of Holland, and part of The Voice franchise, it has aired fourteen series and aims to find currently unsigned singing talent (solo, duets, trios or professional and amateur) contested by aspiring singers, drawn from public auditions.

Presented by Emma Willis from 2014 to 2026, it was previously presented by Holly Willoughby and Reggie Yates from 2012 to 2013 and Marvin Humes who joined Willis from 2014 to 2016. Stacey Solomon and Alesha Dixon will join the presenting team from 2027 onwards. The winners receive a recording contract with Universal Music Group. Winners of each series have been: Leanne Mitchell, Andrea Begley, Jermain Jackman, Stevie McCrorie, Kevin Simm, Mo Adeniran, Ruti Olajugbagbe, Molly Hocking, Blessing Chitapa, Craig Eddie, Anthonia Edwards, Jen & Liv, AVA and Cate McHugh.

The series employs a panel of four coaches who critique the artists' performances and guide their teams of selected artists through the remainder of the series. They also compete to ensure that their act wins the competition, thus making them the winning coach. The original panel featured will.i.am, Jessie J, Sir Tom Jones and Danny O'Donoghue; the panel for the upcoming fifteenth series will feature will.i.am, Kelly Rowland, Cheryl, and Aitch. Other coaches from previous series include: Kylie Minogue, Rita Ora, Ricky Wilson, Paloma Faith, Boy George, Jennifer Hudson, Gavin Rossdale, Olly Murs, Meghan Trainor, Anne-Marie, LeAnn Rimes, and Tom Fletcher & Danny Jones.

In November 2015, the BBC announced that the fifth series of The Voice UK would be their last. That same month, ITV announced they had acquired the rights to air The Voice UK for three additional series, as well as plans for a Kids spin-off edition, which was aired from 2017 to 2023. The fourteenth series began airing on 22 August 2026. Filming for the fifteenth series commenced in September 2026. It will broadcast in 2027.

== History ==
Logo used for the BBC version

The Voice first came to the public eye when the BBC revealed that it was exploring the possibility of acquiring the rights. However, ITV was also interested as it was concerned that The X Factor could lose ratings after Simon Cowell, Cheryl and Dannii Minogue left the panel. ITV were said to be afraid that the show with would "upstage" theirs.

On 18 June 2011, it was reported that the BBC had won the rights to The Voice UK. In mid-2011 it was revealed that BBC would be broadcasting The Voice after paying £22 million. Danny Cohen, the controller of BBC One, said he wants the programme to emulate the success of The Apprentice and defended his decision to invest in it. Cohen said, "I thought it was really good. Every so often the BBC occasionally buys something from abroad that is peerlessly good, like The Apprentice. We adapted that for Britain with Alan Sugar and made the British version the best in the world. We hope The Voice will do similarly. We shouldn't shut the door on anything."

It was later revealed that The Voice would not be going head-to-head with The X Factor as Strictly Come Dancing is broadcast at the end of the year. Channel 4 had entered the bidding war with the BBC and ITV, but later pulled out after the channel's director called the show "derivative" and "a rip-off". It was said that the BBC was keen to sign up a new singing-talent show after it dropped Fame Academy in 2004 and had not revisited the genre. It was also eager to schedule a replacement for So You Think You Can Dance, which was dropped in 2011. Presenter Holly Willoughby also stated that The Voice UK is a "feel good show" saying, "The difference [with The Voice] is it's a blind audition, the coaches can't see the contestants when they come on stage so they judge them purely on their voice and their voice alone. It's really feel-good and the coaches are incredible."

Devised by John de Mol, the creator of Big Brother, The Voice is based on the Dutch TV programme The Voice of Holland and is part of The Voice franchise, being based on the similar American format.

According to Anita Singh from The Daily Telegraph, the BBC have spent £22 million on buying the rights to the show, which will last two years. Of the amount of money spent on it, a BBC spokesperson said, "There is an awful lot of pressure, given the money spent on the format, for the ratings to be good. But at the moment all signs are that it will be cash well spent." Singh stated however, that this contradicted a "pledge" made by Mark Thompson, the director-general. He said, "The BBC needs to make a further significant shift towards distinctiveness, spending more of the licence fee on output which, without the BBC, wouldn't get made at all." The ITV reportedly "offered more for the format but were turned down". After comparisons to the X Factor were made, Cohen defended the decision to gain the rights to the show saying, "We feel that there's enough difference in this format that it will stand out. The fact that ITV tried very hard to get it—even though they've got The X Factor—suggests that they feel this show is different enough [from that one]."

We've got three dancing shows on BBC One this year on Saturday nights, and I wanted to decrease that but still find ways that we could have live, often performance-based television. We are in an era where the audience love that [and] we shouldn't ignore what the audience want."

— Danny Cohen on why the BBC choose to get the rights for The Voice UK.

In October 2011, it was announced that Moira Ross, executive producer of Strictly Come Dancing, quit the show to join production company Wall to Wall, so that she could take the position of executive producer of The Voice UK.

The BBC were planning to make each performance on the show available for download each week, with the proceeds going to charity or the downloads being free, before it is then released commercially. The winner will receive £100,000, as well as a record deal with Universal Republic.

On 24 May 2013, it was reported that BBC One was close to recommissioning the show for a third series in 2014. The next day, it was confirmed that it would return for a third series. In July 2013, Jessie J and Danny O'Donoghue confirmed they would not be able to return as coaches for series 3 due to their music careers and touring. In September, Holly Willoughby and Reggie Yates announced they would not be returning as co-presenters for series 3. It was confirmed the same month that Kylie Minogue and Ricky Wilson would replace Jessie J and O'Donoghue. It was announced that Emma Willis and Marvin Humes would replace Willoughby and Yates as co-presenters for the third series. On 29 March 2014, the BBC confirmed the series would be returning for another two series. In April, Minogue confirmed that she would not return for the fourth series, due to clashes with her Kiss Me Once Tour. On 22 September, it was confirmed that Rita Ora would replace Minogue.

In June 2015, it was announced Ora would be joining the twelfth series of The X Factor. In August 2015, it was announced that Paloma Faith would replace Ora, with Boy George replacing original coach Jones, who was let go and would not be involved in the fifth series' production.

On 7 November 2015, it was announced that the fifth series of The Voice UK would be the last to air on BBC. On 23 November 2015, ITV announced they had acquired the rights to air The Voice UK for three additional series, set to begin airing in 2017. They also announced their plans to produce two additional series, The Voice Kids and an untitled ITV2 spin-off, both also set to air in 2017. The last episode aired on the BBC on 9 April 2016. The ITV2 spin-off show was axed on 8 August 2016, but it could return in the future.

On 10 December 2020, ITV announced the tenth series of The Voice UK would premiere on 2 January 2021.

In November 2021, only the new series of The Voice Kids was included by ITV as part of its Highlights brochure (for Christmas 2021), with the 2022 series of The Voice UK losing its Saturday night slot in January, to the Olly Murs hosted Starstruck format with Sheridan Smith, Adam Lambert, Jason Manford and Beverley Knight.

=== Scheduling ===
After speculation in February, the show's air date was confirmed on 10 March 2012. Of this announcement, the show's Twitter account said, "Two weeks from now, something new will be on your television, something so great you'll want to run up and kiss the screen. Just FYI." Britain's Got Talent judge Alesha Dixon confirmed the launch date for the Britain's Got Talent, with it being the same day as The Voice UK's. Britain's Got Talent was brought forward by ITV, so it could clash with the show. For the past four years however, Britain's Got Talent had launched in mid-April. The BBC and ITV were reportedly in a "scheduling war". BBC moved the show from its supposed 7:15 slot to 7:00, to avoid "significant overlap". ITV then responded by moving Britain's Got Talent from its original slot at 7:45 to 7:30. A BBC source said, "It is disappointing they chose to launch Britain's Got Talent on the same day as us. To not even meet us halfway on avoiding any sort of overlap is incredibly competitive."

As The Voice progressed, it became clear that audiences were staying loyal during the period when it clashed with Britain's Got Talent. After the third Blind Auditions round, when the BBC programme enjoyed a viewership margin of some four million, Simon Cowell and ITV executives moved their show to a later start time.

In an exclusive interview with Digital Spy, Cowell stated that the show is "competition" for Britain's Got Talent. He said, "I recognise [The Voice] as a challenge. The BBC must be confident because they have put it up against this show. They want to make a competition out of it. So we've got to make [Britain's Got Talent] better. Everyone benefits because of that." However, presenter Reggie Yates denied this: "I don't know if this is about toppling anyone. This is a very different animal altogether. I think when you see what this show is all about, you'll see exactly where we are coming from."

In 2013, the shows clashed again, this time with BGT starting in its usual mid-April Slot. Both shows went directly head to head with The Voice from 6.45-8.15 and BGT from 7-8.35. With BGT winning the war, The Voice moved to a later slot and for the rest of the run, only clashed with BGT for 10-15 minutes each week.

In 2016, the shows clashed again. The Voice's BBC finale was moved back a week due to a Six Nations game which meant it clashed with the BGT launch. The Voice aired from 7-9 with BGT from 7-8.25. Whilst original schedules had The Voice from 6-8 and BGT from 8-9.20, the shows both changed to a 7.00 start time.

=== Promotion ===
The first promotional item the BBC released was a video on the official website. It read, "Four of the biggest names in music are looking for incredible singing talent to compete for the title of The Voice UK. Only the most unique and distinctive voices will make it to the filmed auditions and get to sing for our celebrity coaches". To promote the show, all four coaches went to Central London launch event, which took place at Soho Hotel on 24 February 2012. Daily Mirror's Jo Usmar commented on the promotion of the show, stating that the trailer will "get you juices flowing". A further trailer was released on 9 March, featuring footage from the show, "including interviews with the panel, a first look at some contestants and bickering between the coaches".

=== Social media ===
According to Digital Spy, the BBC was trying to "boost audience participation with a wealth of social media and online activity, as viewers often watch programmes while also commenting and engaging via Twitter and Facebook on a smartphone, laptop or tablet". Telegraph Hill, having previously worked on BBC Three dramas Being Human and The Fades, put in place a full-time team of "social media creatives" who will generate online videos around the show, and on the show's Facebook and Twitter pages.

=== Auditions and filming ===
The producer auditions of series one began on 31 October 2011. Five events took place in London, two events in Birmingham, Glasgow, Manchester and Cardiff, and one event in Belfast. Solo artists and duos can participate, however, they must be aged sixteen or over. The coaches did not attend the producer's auditions. The blind auditions for the first series were held at BBC Television Centre and has since been held at dock10 studios in Salford Quays. O'Donoghue told Digital Spy of the talent at the auditions, "The talent on show after the first auditions on the first day beat out any talent in any finals I've ever seen on television. The hair on the back of my neck and arms was standing up. 16 and 17-year-olds were up there killing it".

== Format ==
The Voice is a reality television series that features four coaches looking for a talented new artist, who could become a global superstar. The show's concept is indicated by its title: the coaches do not judge the artists by their looks, personalities, stage presence or dance routines—only their vocal ability. It is this aspect that differentiates The Voice from other reality television series such as The X Factor, Britain's Got Talent or even Pop Idol. The competitors are split into four teams, which are mentored by the coaches who in turn choose songs for their artists to perform. There is no specific age range and anyone can audition; if a coach likes what they hear, a button-press allows their chair to spin around and face the performer, signifying that they would like to mentor them. If more than one does so, then the artist selects a coach. However, if no coach turns around then the artist is sent home. The Voice has been referred to as a "big, exciting and warm-hearted series"and a "new generation in its genre". The discomfort caused by the poor design of the chair, which weighs 19-stone, has drawn criticism from will.i.am, who claims that it makes him hunch his shoulders.

There are five different stages: producers' auditions, Blind auditions, Battle phase, Knockout stage and live shows.

=== Producers' auditions and blind auditions ===
The Voice UK's first stage is the producers' auditions, which are not shown on television. The first shown stage is the blind auditions, where they sing in front of the coaches. The coaches have their backs to the singer, and if they like what they hear, they can press their button to turn around and recruit them to their team. If more than one coach turns, the power shifts to the singer, who then decides which team they would like to be part of. Each coach must recruit a number of singers (10 in series 1, 12 from series 2 to series 5 and 10 since series 6 onwards) to their team in the blind auditions to progress on to the battle phase.

Since 2017, artists that are not selected by any of the coaches leave the stage after their song and do not talk with the coaches. Equally, the chairs do not turn and hence the coaches do not see any of the artists that are not picked. Starting also in series 10, "Block" buttons were added, which prevents one coach to recruit artist on its team. Each coach is given only one block in the entire auditions. The block buttons were removed from series 12 (2023).

In series 14, the "Rewind" was introduced, each coach was given one to save an artist from elimination during the blind auditions. Series 15 introduced the "lockdown" button, allowing each coach, during a four-chair turn, to lock down all other coaches, defaulting the artist on to their team, this button replaced the rewind.

=== Battle phase ===
The second stage, 'Battle phase', is where two artists are mentored and then developed by their respective coach. The coaches of the team will "dedicate themselves to developing their artists, giving them advice, and sharing the secrets of their success in the music industry". Members of teams perform duets and the coach chooses who advances to the next stage.

In Series 2 (2013), the BBC introduced a new 'steal' twist to the Battle phase. The 'steal' gives a chance to the losers of the head-to-head battles to give one last pitch to the coaches, excluding their own coach, on why they should remain in the process. The coaches then have an amount of time to push their button on their spinning chairs if they want the contestant on their team. As with the blind auditions, if more than one coach presses their button, the contestant chooses which coach to join. In Series 4 (2015), a second steal was added, thus increasing the progressing team to eight members. In Series 6 (2017), each coach only had one steal each. From series 11–13 (2022–2024) the battles were axed in favour of the callbacks. They were added back in series 14 (2026).

=== Knockout stage ===
The third stage of the competition is the 'Knockout stage'. It was first introduced in the second series (2013). The four coaches will enter this stage with seven team members each; six winners of the battle phase, and one stolen member. Artists perform a 'killer song' of their choosing and the coaches each pick three members of their team to go through to the live shows, creating a final 12 for the public vote. For series 7 in 2018, this was changed. Only 6 members in each team participated in the knockouts, and only two from each team advanced. Also, series 8 had a new twist, one eliminated contestant could be bought back to compete in the live shows, through the 'lifeline vote'. This meant that 9 acts would take part in the live shows. From series 10 (2021), the knockout round has been axed.

=== Callbacks ===
The second stage of the competition is the 'Callbacks'. It was first introduced in the eleventh series (2022). The four coaches are all assisted by guest mentors to help make their decisions. They all have their ten acts from the 'Blind Auditions'. From here, the artists are put into a group of three or four where they will all take individual turns to perform the same song - given to them by their coach. After all the other artists perform, they come together & their coach then picks 3 artists from other groups to advance to the semi-final, leaving each coach with 3 semi-finalists. In total, 12 artists advance to the semi-final, eliminating 28 acts during the process. For the 2026 series, the callbacks have been axed in favour of the battles.

=== Live shows ===
In the 'Live shows' artists perform in front of the coaches and audience, broadcast live, with the current exceptions being the 2020 and 2022–2026 series, which were pre-recorded.

In the first series (2012), each coach had five artists in their team to begin with and the artists went head-to-head to win public votes. The votes determined which artists advanced to the final eight.

The final eight artists competed in a live broadcast. However, the coaches had a 50/50 say with the audience and the public in deciding which artists moved on to the 'final four' phase. In the first three series, each coach had one member who continued. However, from the fourth series in 2015, the semi-final format changes; only public votes decide which artists move on to the final, regardless of their team. Therefore, a coach may have two of his/her artists in the final. The final (the winner round) was decided upon by the public vote. Throughout the final the coaches frequently performed with their artists. The winner was crowned The Voice.

From the second series (2013), after the introduction of the 'steal' in the battle phase and the new 'knockout stage', each coach will have three artists on their team a total of 12 artists in the live shows to fight for the public vote and to be crowned 'The Voice', subsequently receiving a record deal with Universal Music.

From the tenth series (2021) This has changed 3 contestants from each team perform fortnightly and only 2 of them from each team will be facing the public vote and one of their coaches will reveal the contestant with the most public votes to go to the live final.

From the eleventh series (2022) each coach has 3 acts in the semi-final. Each coach must select one from their team to advance to the final, eliminating the other 2. In the final, the studio audience votes for the winner, which will receive the record deal with Universal Music.

From the twelfth series (2023) In the final, the winner with the most votes received a £50,000 cash prize and a luxury holiday to Mauritius.

== Series overview ==
Warning: the following table presents a significant amount of different colours.

Teams colour key
Artist from Team Tom J.	Artist from Team Kylie	Artist from Team Anne-Marie
Artist from Team Danny O.	Artist from Team George	Artist from Team Tom F. & Danny J.
Artist from Team Will	Artist from Team JHud	Artist from Team LeAnn
Artist from Team Jessie	Artist from Team Olly	Artist from Team Kelly
Artist from Team Ricky	Artist from Team Meghan

The Voice UK series overview
Series	Aired	Winner	Other finalists			Winning coach	Presenters
1	2012	Leanne Mitchell	Bo Bruce	Tyler James	Vince Kidd	Tom Jones	Holly Willoughby, Reggie Yates
2	2013	Andrea Begley	Leah McFall	Mike Ward	Matt Henry	Danny O'Donoghue	Holly Willoughby, Reggie Yates
3	2014	Jermain Jackman	Christina Marie	Sally Barker	Jamie Johnson	will.i.am	Emma Willis, Marvin Humes
4	2015	Stevie McCrorie	Lucy O'Byrne	Emmanuel Nwamadi	Sasha Simone	Ricky Wilson	Emma Willis, Marvin Humes
5	2016	Kevin Simm	Jolan	Cody Frost	Lydia Lucy	Ricky Wilson	Emma Willis, Marvin Humes
6	2017	Mo Adeniran	Into The Ark	Jamie Miller	Michelle John	Jennifer Hudson	Emma Willis
7	2018	Ruti Olajugbagbe	Donel Mangena	Belle Voci	Lauren Bannon	Tom Jones	Emma Willis
8	2019	Molly Hocking	Deana Walmsley	Jimmy Balito	Bethzienna Williams	Olly Murs	Emma Willis
9	2020	Blessing Chitapa	Jonny Brooks	Brooke Scullion	Gevanni Hutton	Olly Murs	Emma Willis
10	2021	Craig Eddie	Grace Holden	Hannah Williams	Okulaja	Anne-Marie	Emma Willis
11	2022	Anthonia Edwards	David Adeogun	Mark Howard	Naomi Johnson	Tom Jones	Emma Willis
12	2023	Jen & Liv	Callum Doignie	Hope Winter	Jolie Stevens	will.i.am	Emma Willis
13	2024	AVA	Billy & Louie	Deb Orah	Storry	Tom Fletcher & Danny Jones	Emma Willis
14	2026	Cate McHugh	Frank Raven	Monique Nicholson-Porter	Naná Aldrin-Quaye	Tom Jones	Emma Willis
15	2027	Upcoming series					Alesha Dixon, Stacey Solomon

== Spin-offs ==
=== Louder on Two ===
Starting on 24 March 2014, a new spin-off series aired on BBC Two during the live shows every weekday night. The series is hosted by Strictly Come Dancing: It Takes Two presenter Zoe Ball, and features interviews with the coaches and contestants as well as providing live acoustic performances by the artists. The show did not return in 2015, for the fourth series of the main show.

=== The V Room ===
An online spin-off show titled The V Room was announced in October 2016, with Cel Spellman presenting. The show started after the live shows in March 2017. Spellman did not return for series 7 in 2018, and was replaced by previous runner–up Jamie Miller. The show is available on-demand via the ITVX and features exclusive content across social media sites and the show's mobile app. The show started after the live shows in March 2018. On 12 March 2018, Vick Hope took over for Jamie Miller as the show's new digital reporter.

== Coaches ==
The coaching line-up was announced on 8 December 2011. Presenter Holly Willoughby described them as "badass" and "incredible". All four coaches confirmed they would return as coaches for a second series.

Kylie Minogue and Ricky Wilson joined will.i.am and Tom Jones as coaches for the third series following the departures of Jessie J and O'Donoghue. Later on, Rita Ora replaced Minogue for the fourth series. After only one series, Ora left the show, due to touring commitments and joined rival show, The X Factor UK. On 14 August, it was announced that Paloma Faith and Boy George would join Wilson and will.i.am for the fifth series, meaning that Jones would not return. Jones' axe had a widespread negative response from viewers and by Jones himself, with Jones claiming that he had no idea he had been axed.

On 13 November 2015, Wilson announced that the fifth series would be his last as a coach. However, on 24 March 2016, it was announced that he could make a return to the show. The following month, after just one series on the show, Faith stated that she had left due to her pregnancy. In July 2016, it was confirmed that Boy George had decided not to return for the sixth series on ITV. will.i.am later revealed that he would return as a coach for the 2017 series, but Wilson later announced that he would not. In September 2016, the coaches for the 2017 series was confirmed as will.i.am, Jennifer Hudson, Sir Tom Jones and Gavin Rossdale.

On 6 March 2017, ITV confirmed that will.i.am. would return to the series in 2018. The network also expressed that "all parties" were interested in Jones' return, as well. In October 2017, it was announced that Jones and Hudson would return, alongside singer Olly Murs joining the coaching panel, replacing Rossdale. On 21 September 2018, the Daily Express announced that will.i.am, Jones, Hudson and Murs would all return to the show as coaches for the eighth series. In September 2019, it was announced that Meghan Trainor would replace a departing Hudson, who cited work commitments in the United States as the reason for her departure; Jones, Murs and will.i.am were announced to be returning alongside Trainor.

On 8 October 2020, Trainor announced that she would not be returning for the tenth series, after announcing her pregnancy. English singer-songwriter Anne-Marie would replace Trainor in 2021. All four coaches returned for the eleventh and twelfth series. On 22 September 2023, Murs announced that he would not be returning for the thirteenth series of the show after being axed. On 29 October 2023, it was also revealed that Anne-Marie had been axed, to refresh the judging panel. On 21 February 2024, it was announced that will.i.am and Jones would be joined by LeAnn Rimes and McFly band members Tom Fletcher and Danny Jones, with the latter being a coach on the kids version, as the first duo coach on the series. On 3 May 2025, it was announced that Rimes would leave the show while will.i.am, Jones and McFly would return for the fourteenth series. On 3 June 2025, former The Voice Australia coach Kelly Rowland was announced as Rimes' replacement.

On 8 September 2026, Tom Jones released a statement confirming that he will not return as a coach for the 2027 series after ITV's decision to "fire" him to refresh the show. Three days later, ITV announced that Fletcher and Danny Jones would also leave the show. Aitch and Cheryl were named as new coaches.

=== Timeline ===
Coach	Series														
Coach	1	2	3	4	5	6	7	8	9	10	11	12	13	14	15
will.i.am															
Jessie J															
Sir Tom Jones															
Danny O'Donoghue															
Kylie Minogue															
Ricky Wilson															
Rita Ora															
Boy George															
Paloma Faith															
Jennifer Hudson															
Gavin Rossdale															
Olly Murs															
Meghan Trainor															
Anne-Marie															
LeAnn Rimes															
Tom Fletcher & Danny Jones															
Kelly Rowland															
Cheryl															
Aitch															

=== Gallery ===
Coaches gallery

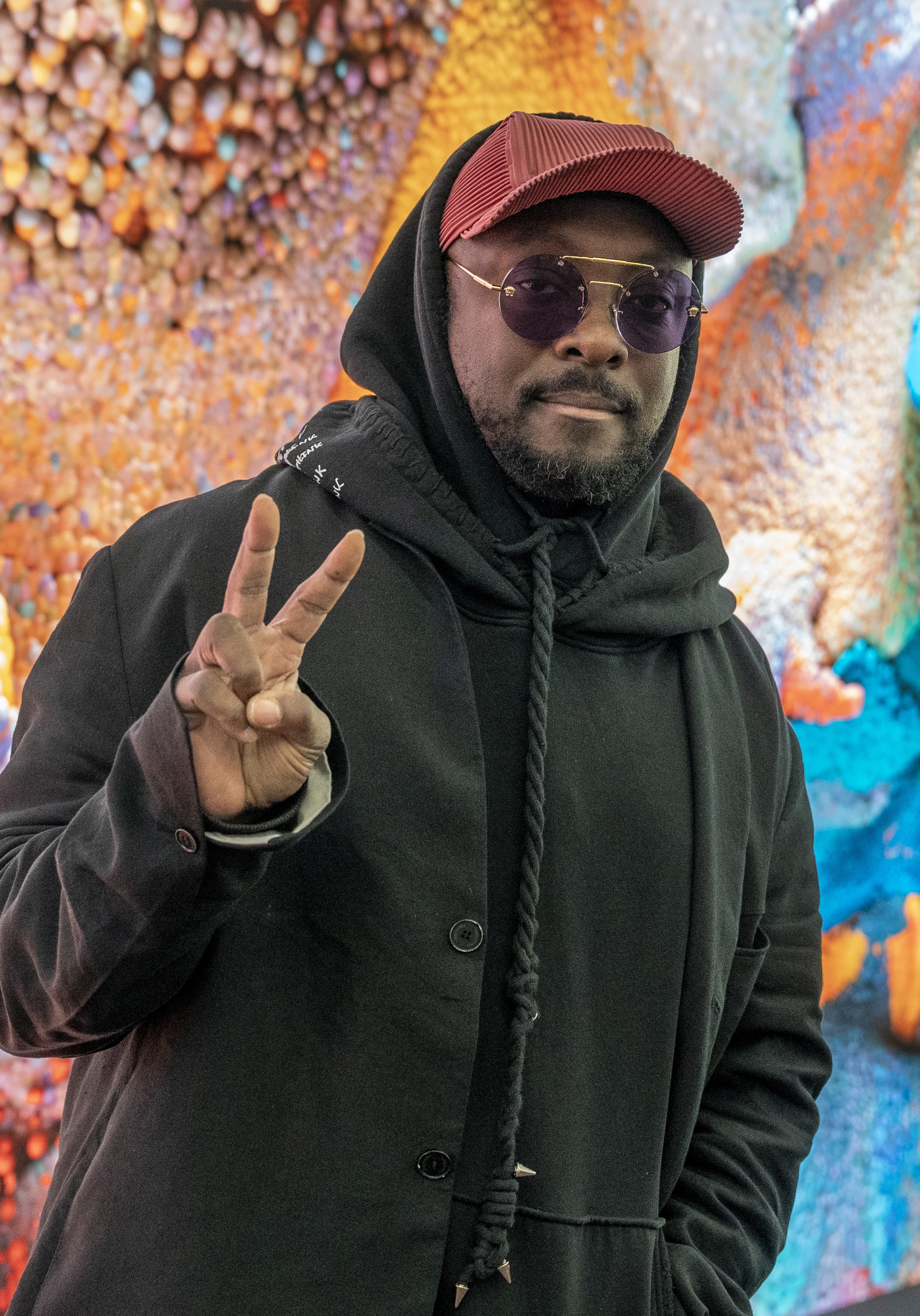
will.i.am
(1–present)

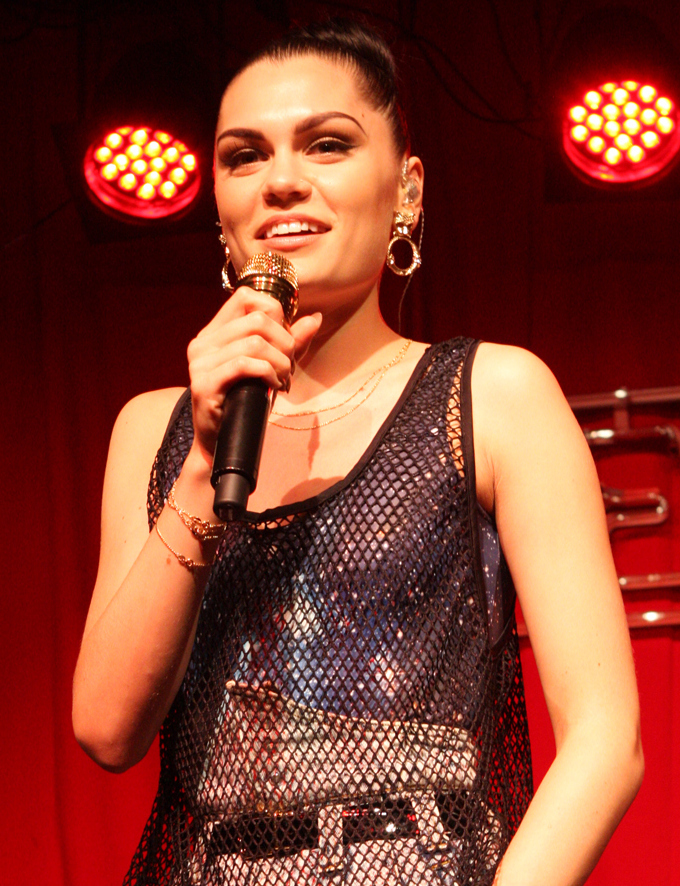
Jessie J
(1–2)

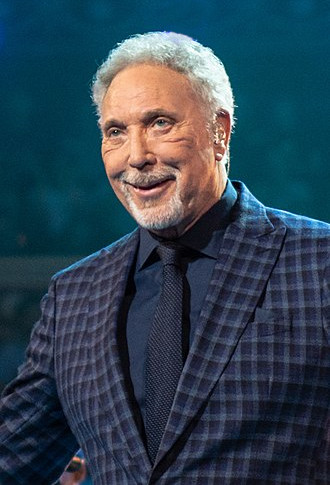
Sir Tom Jones
(1–4, 6–14)

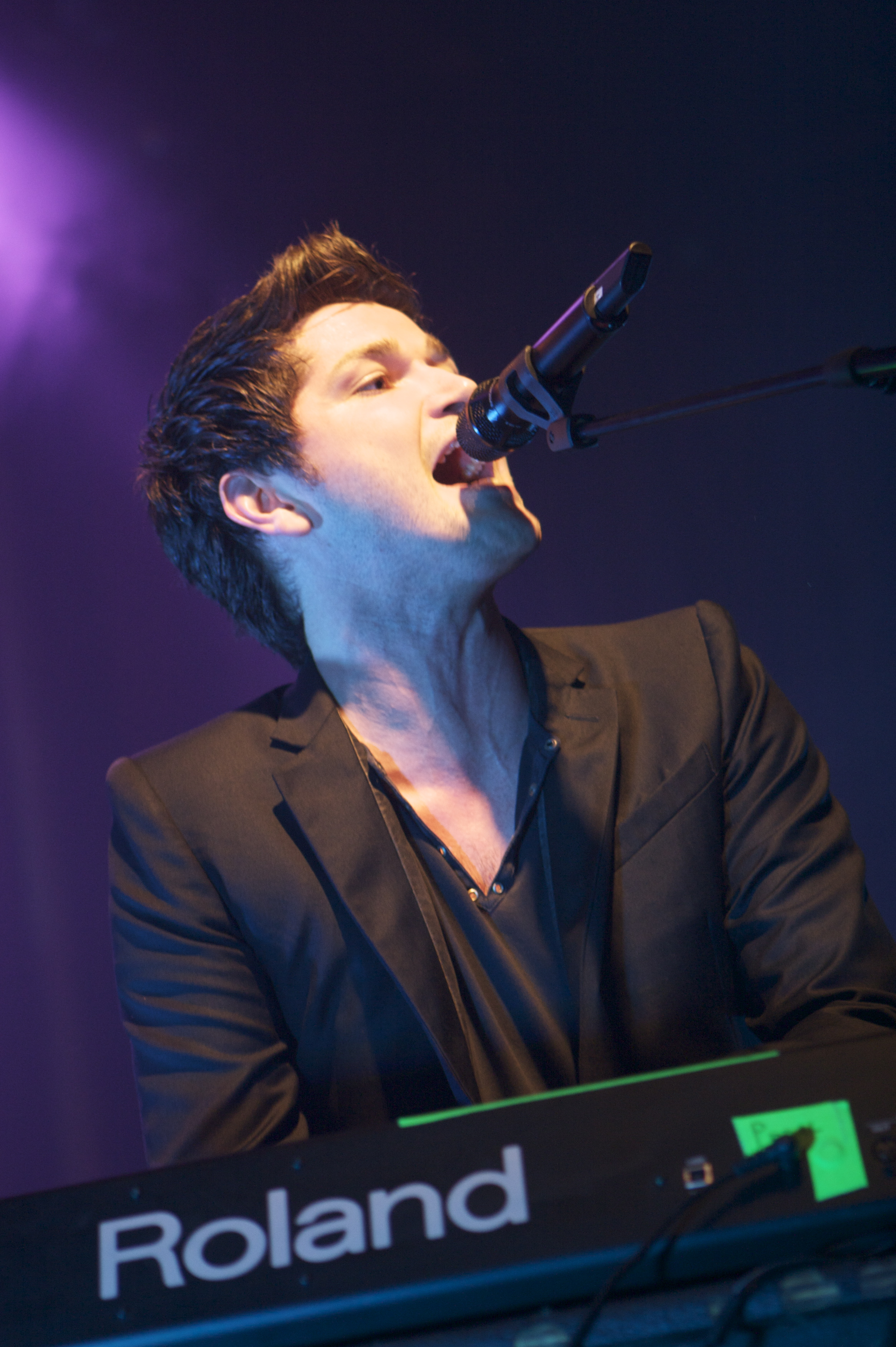
Danny O'Donoghue
(1–2)

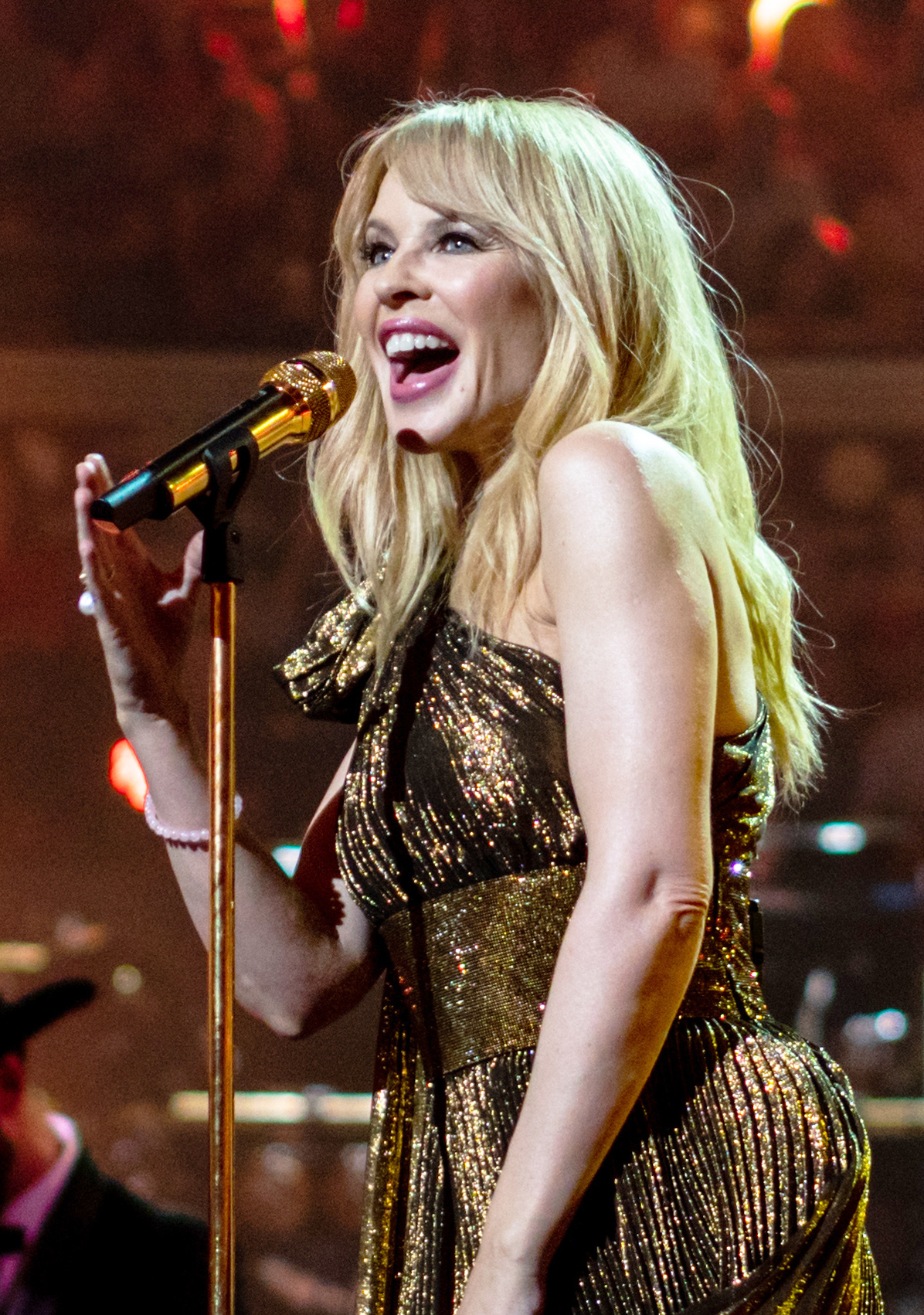
Kylie Minogue
(3)

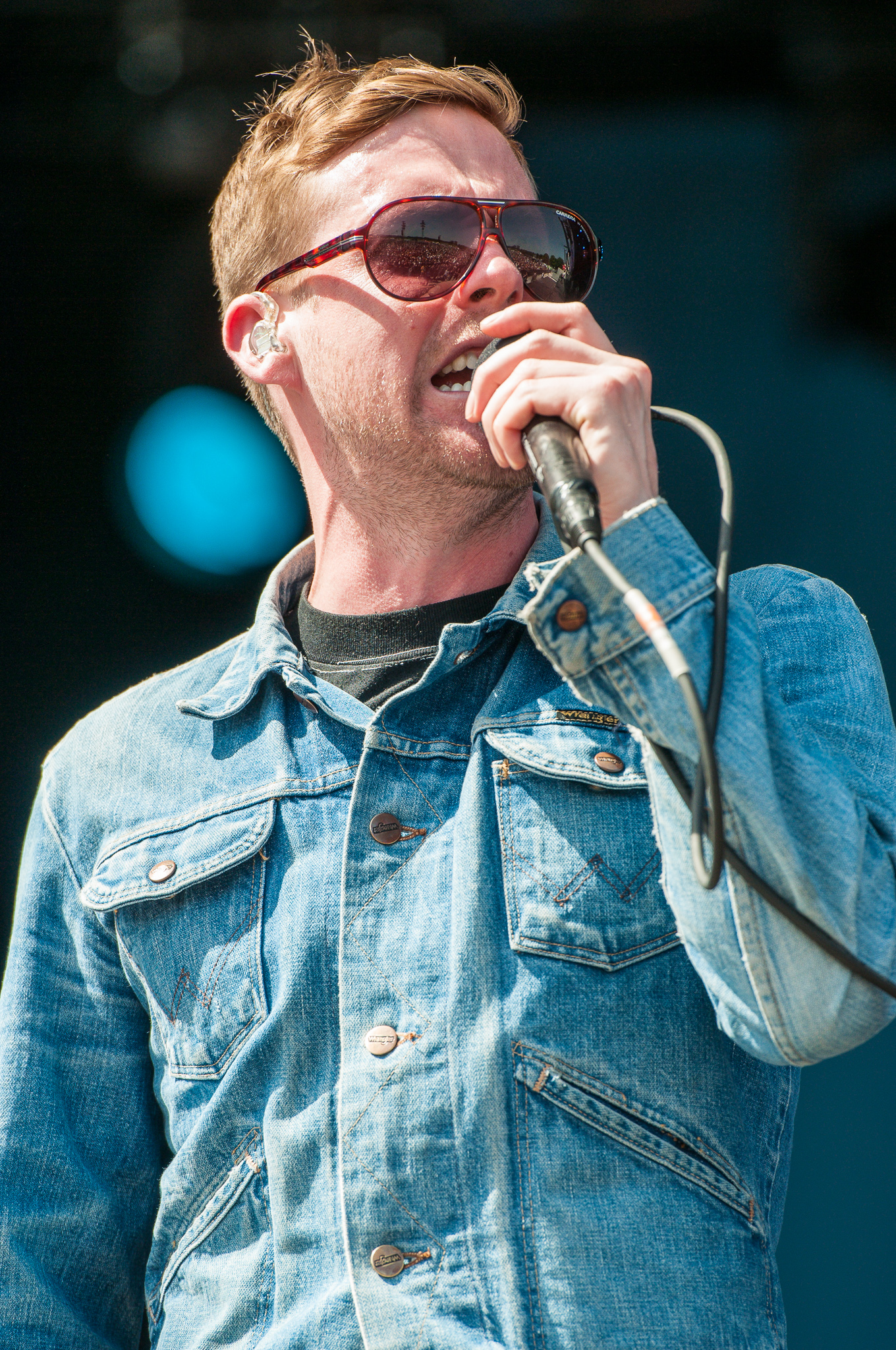
Ricky Wilson
(3–5)

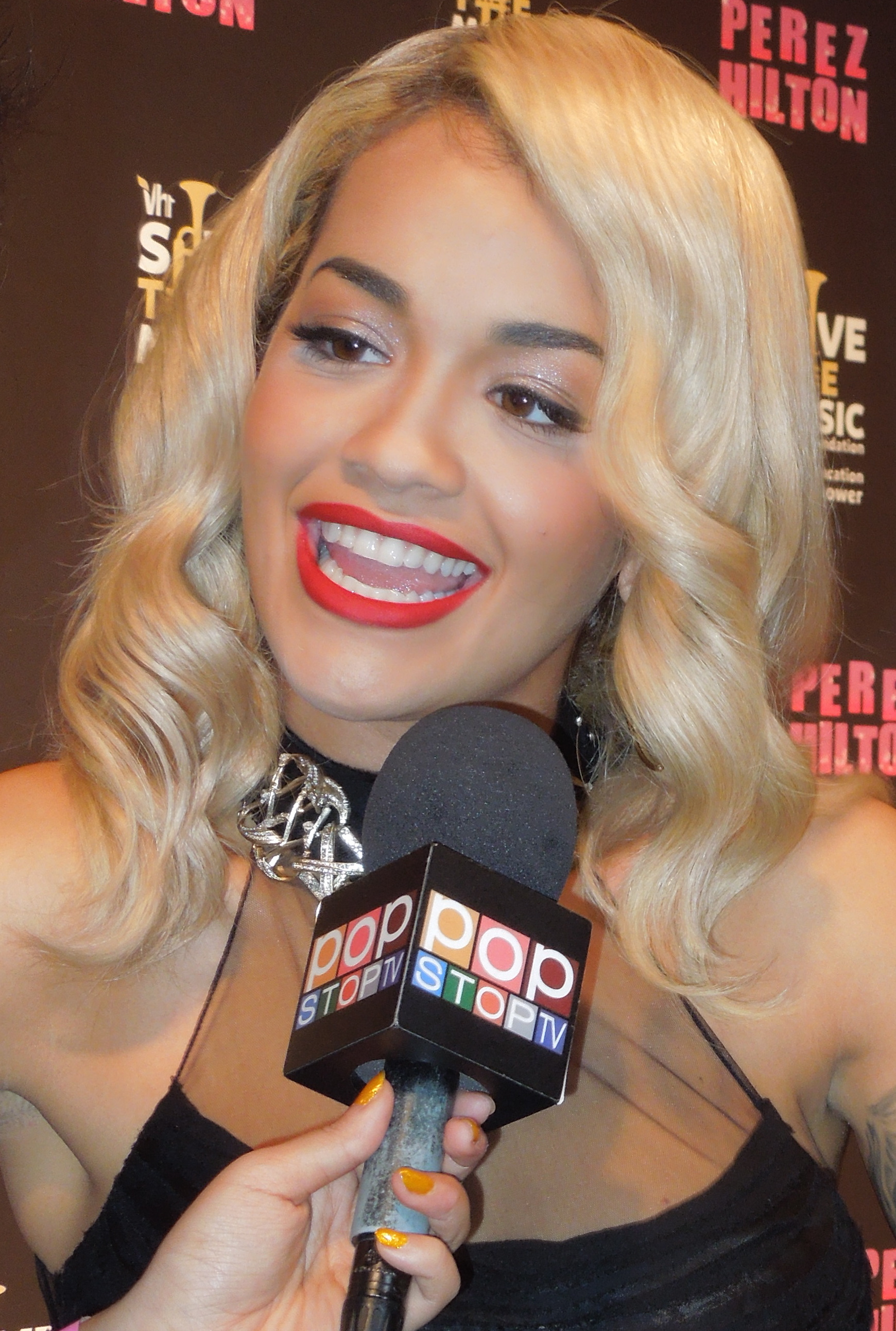
Rita Ora
(4)

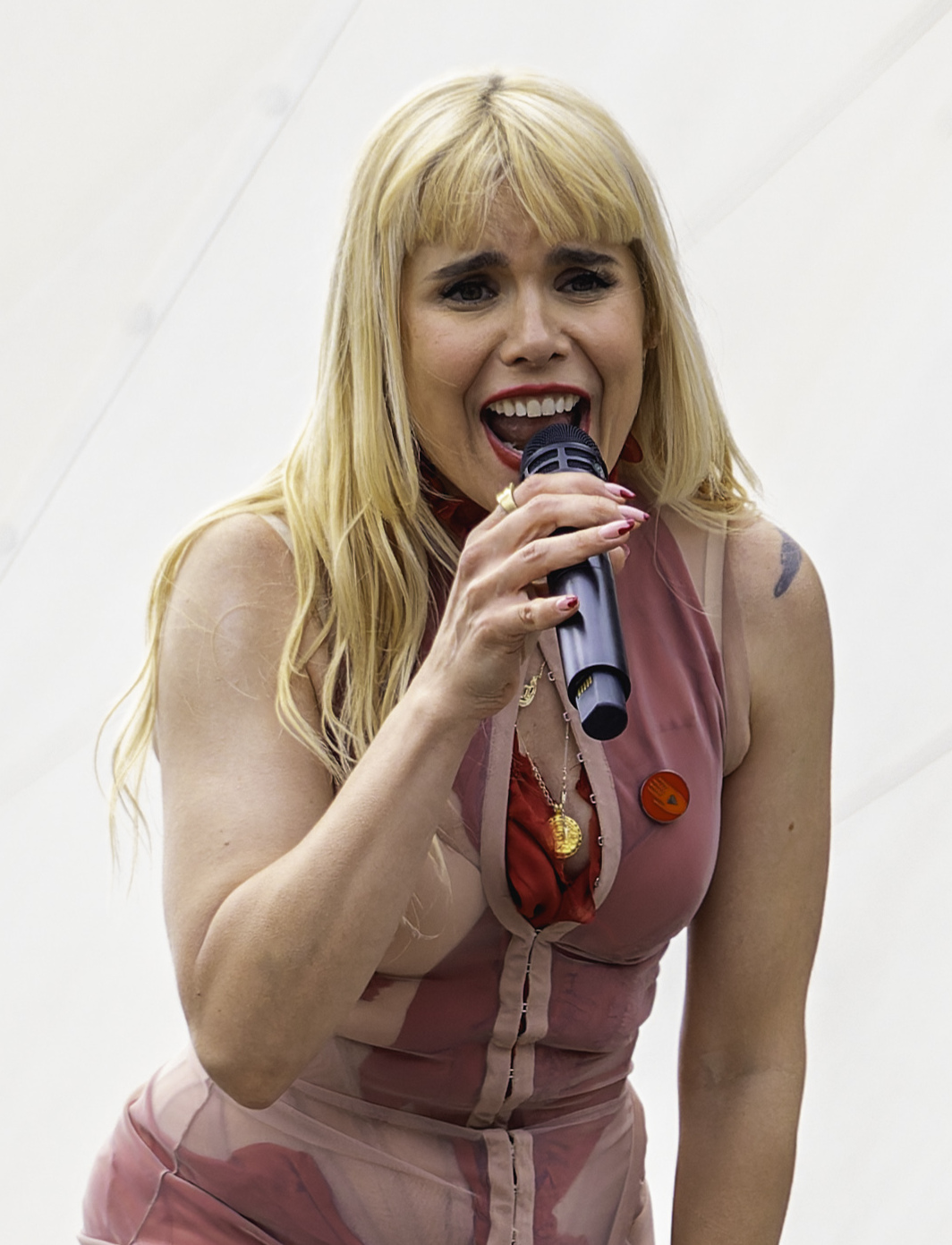
Paloma Faith
(5)

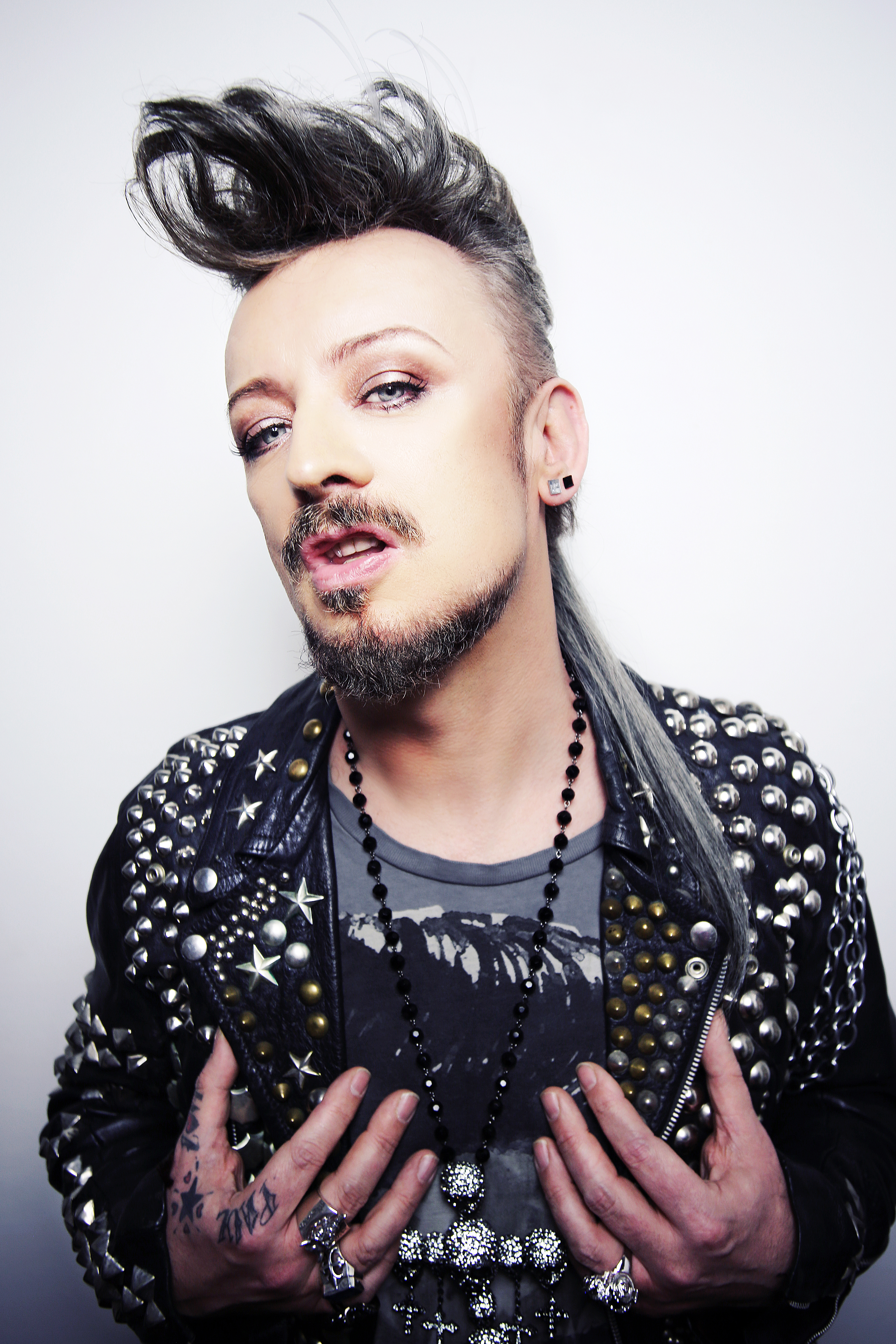
Boy George
(5)

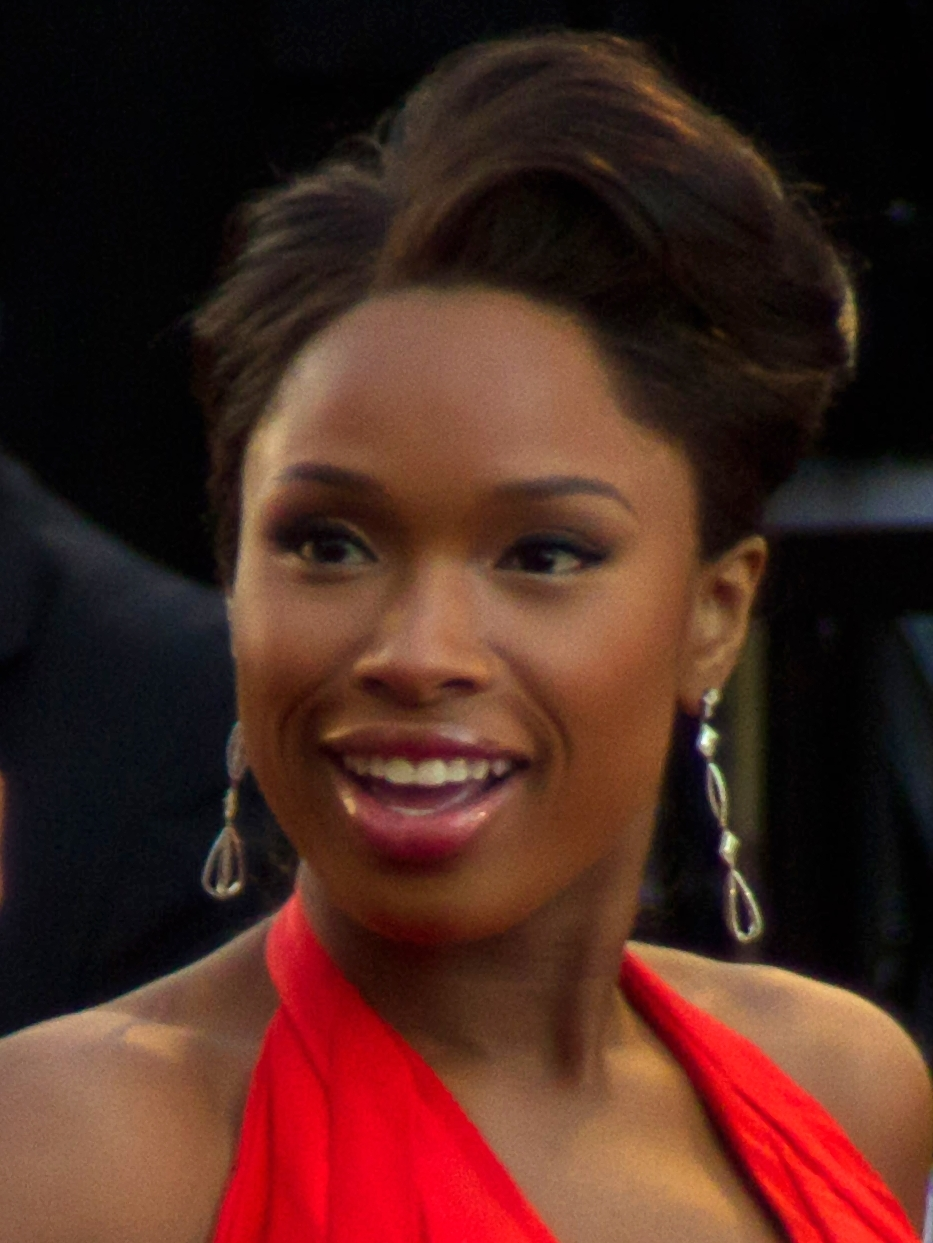
Jennifer Hudson
(6–8)

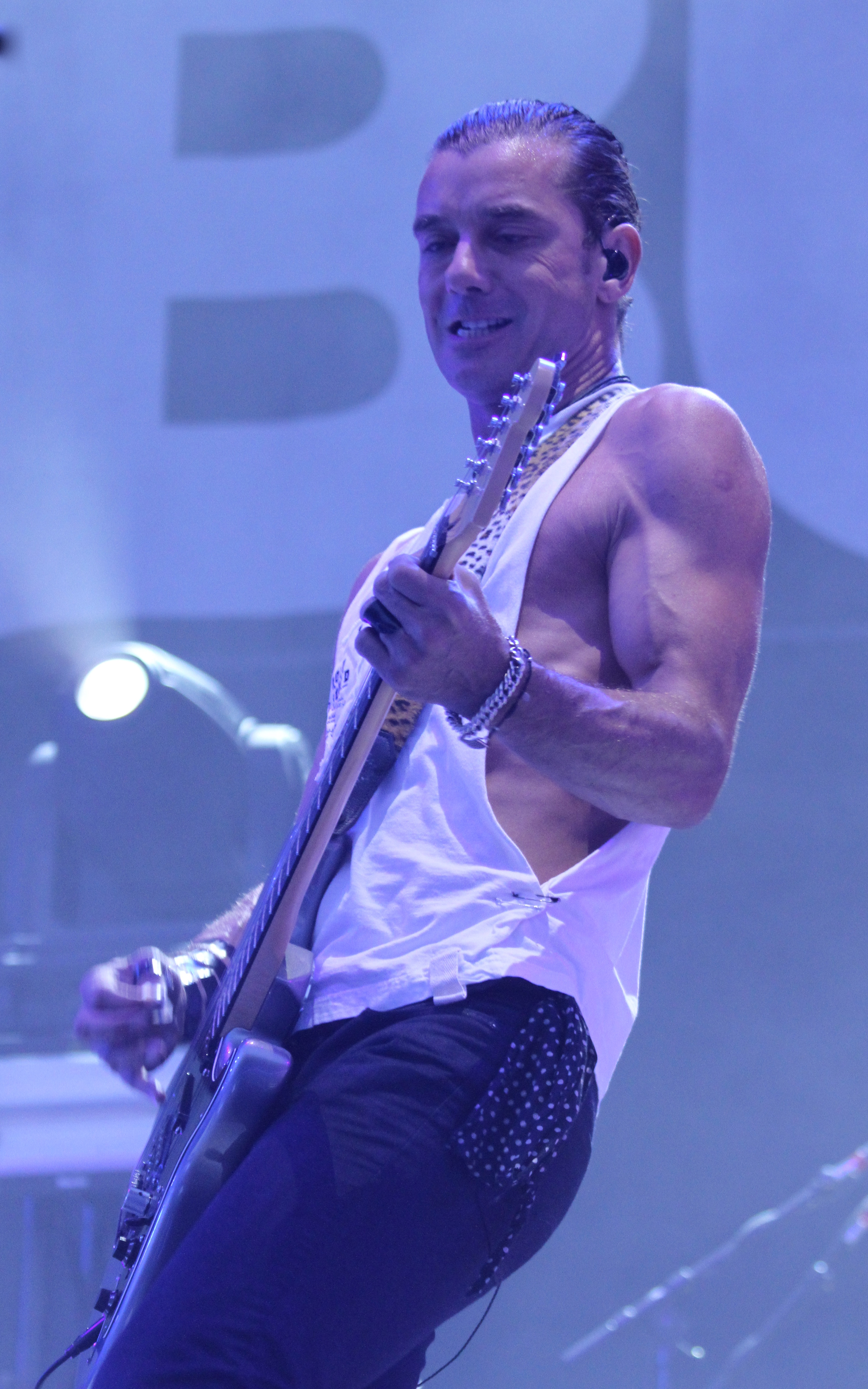
Gavin Rossdale
(6)

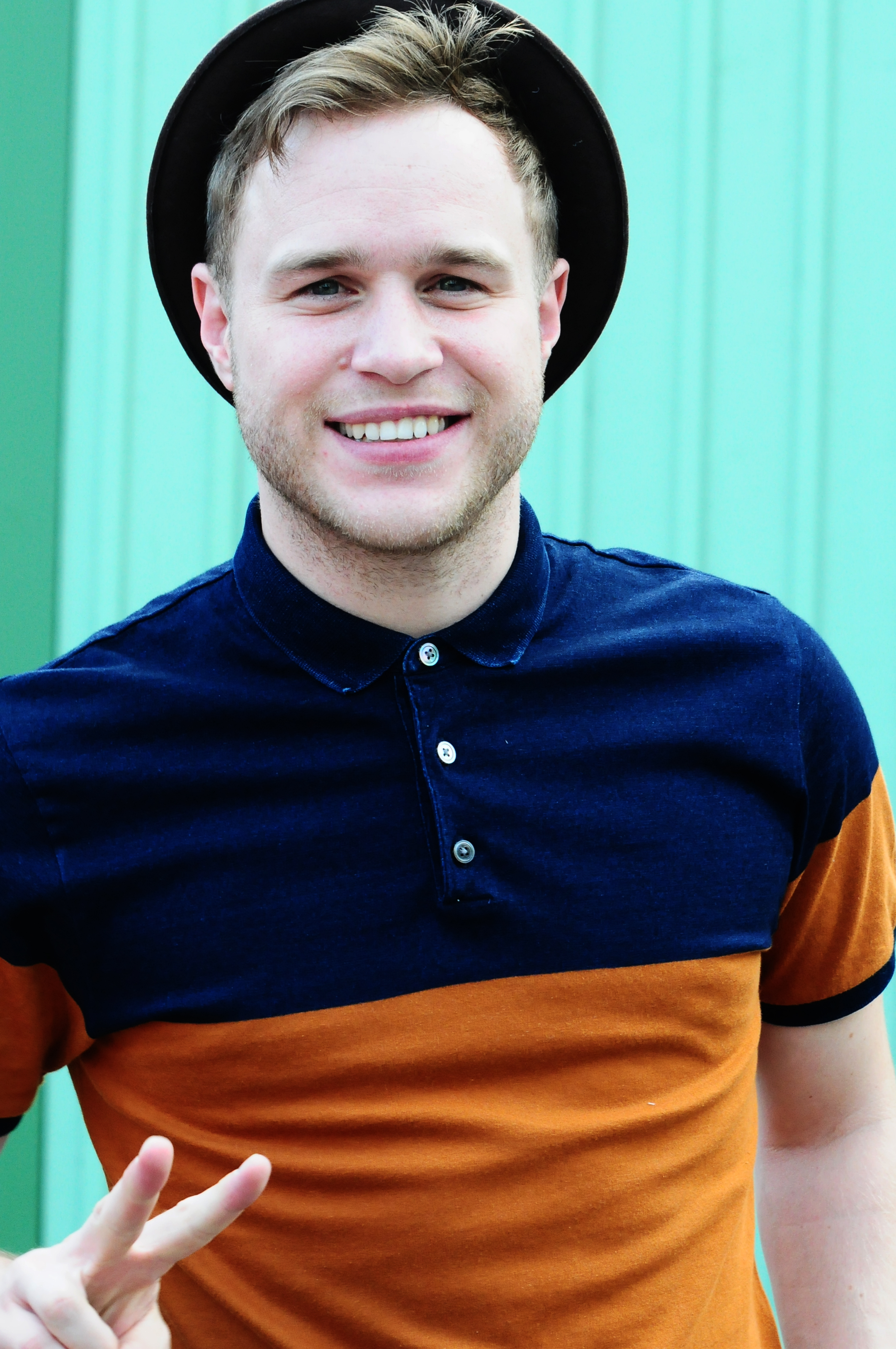
Olly Murs
(7–12)

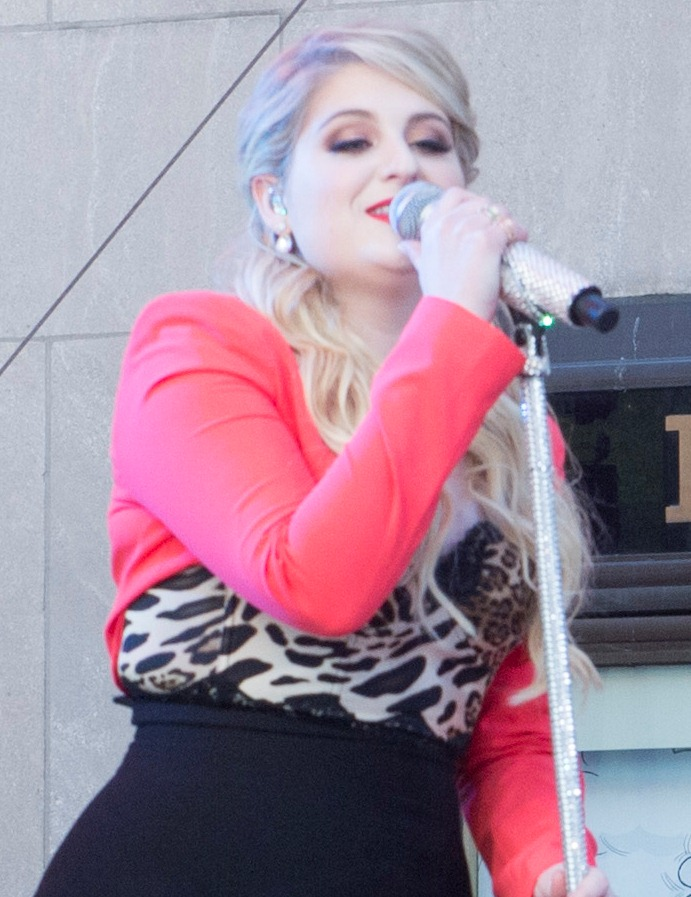
Meghan Trainor
(9)

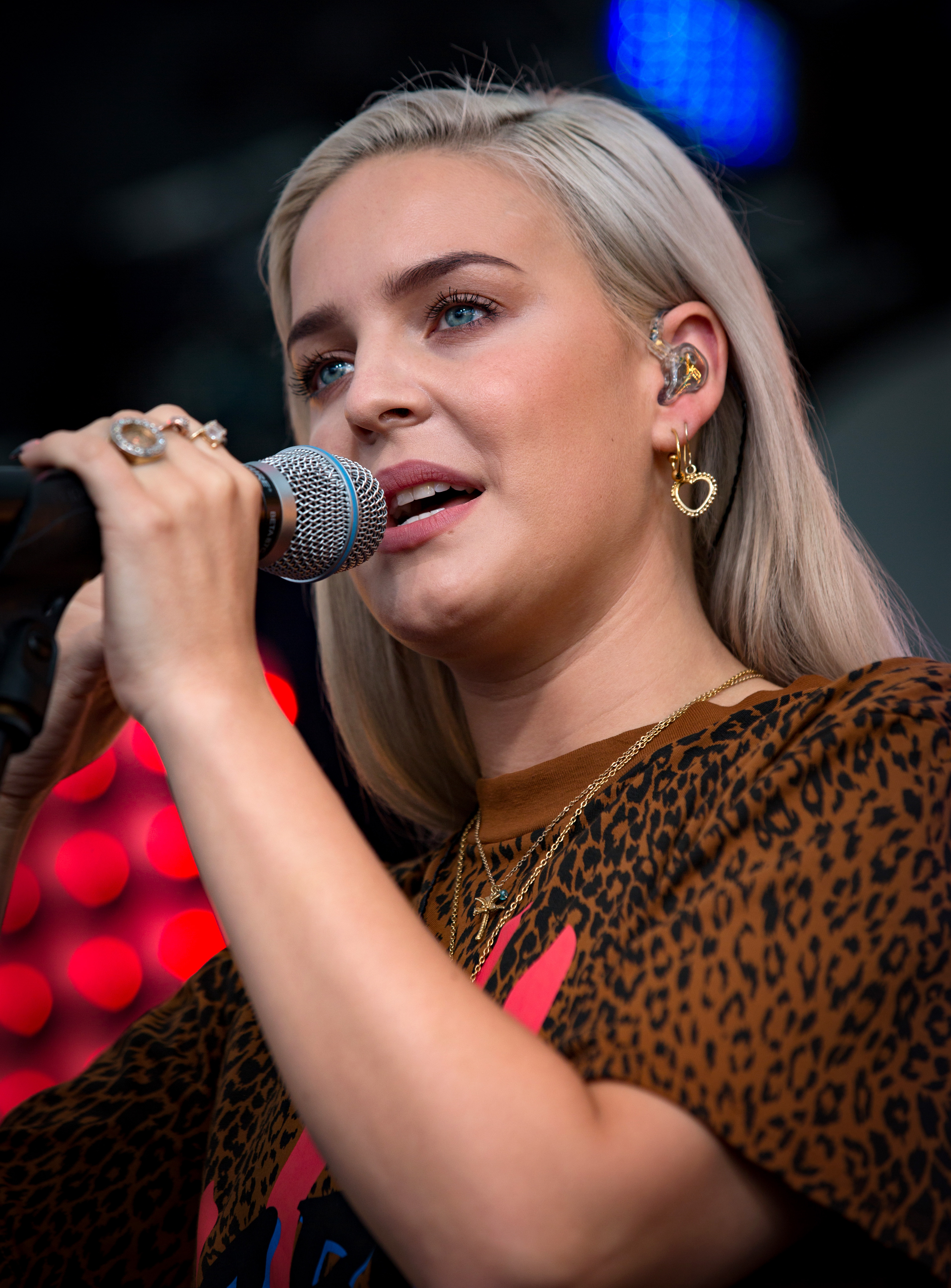
Anne-Marie
(10–12)

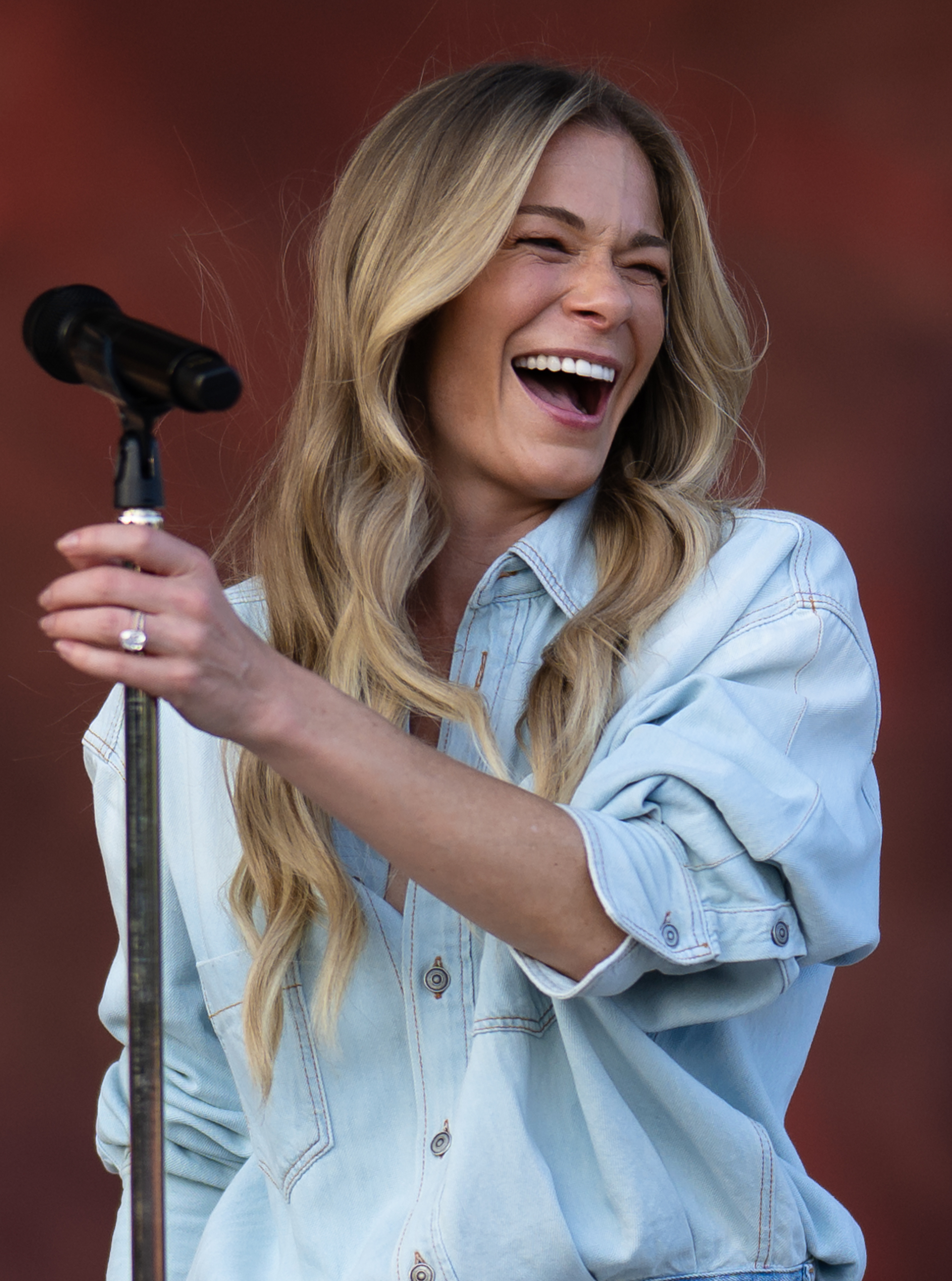
LeAnn Rimes
(13)

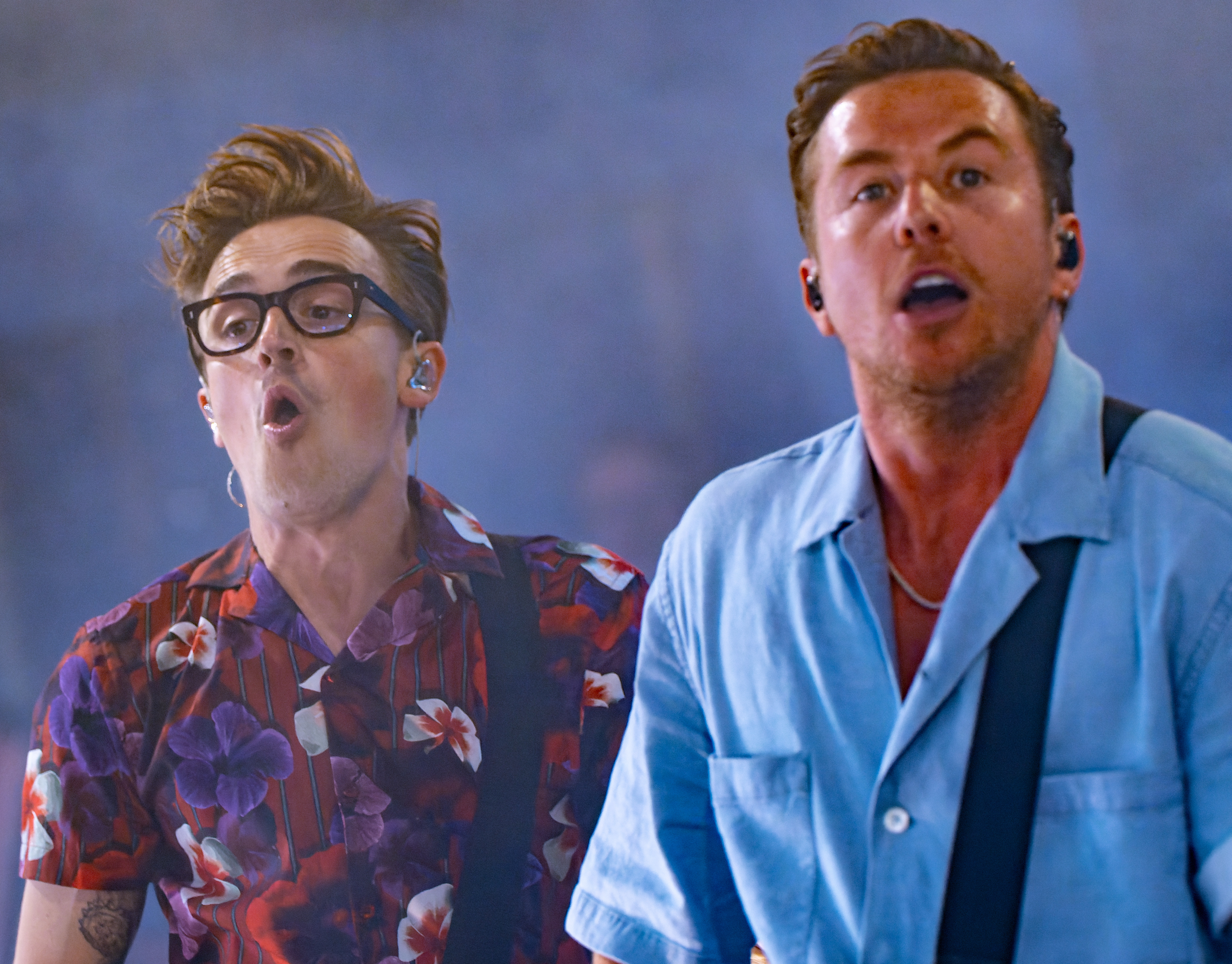
Tom Fletcher & Danny Jones
(13–14)

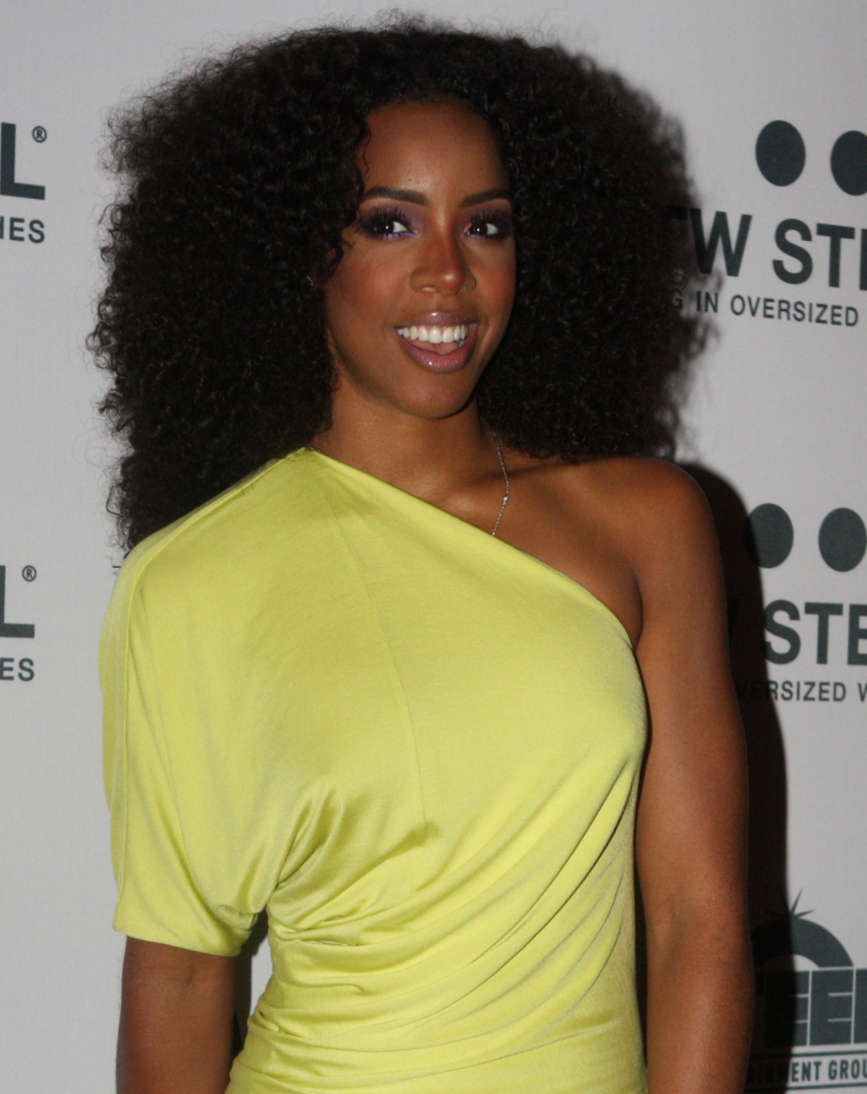
Kelly Rowland (since 14)

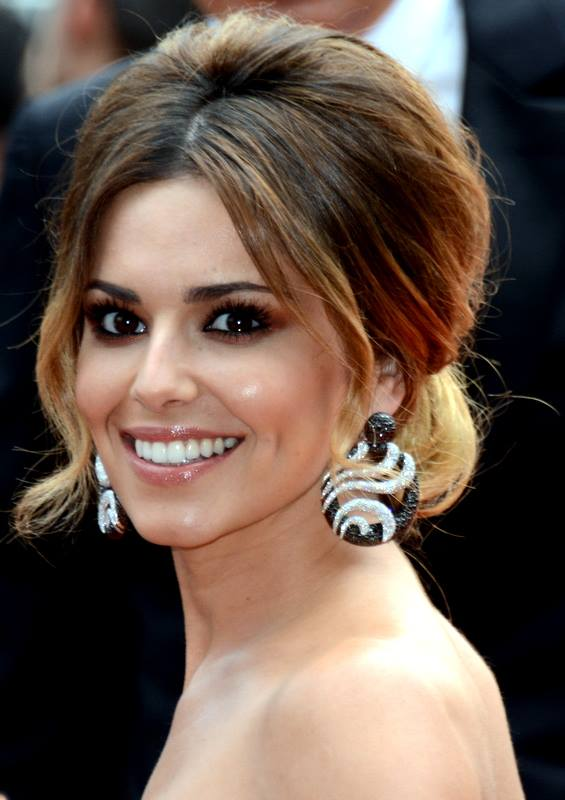
Cheryl (upcoming in 15)

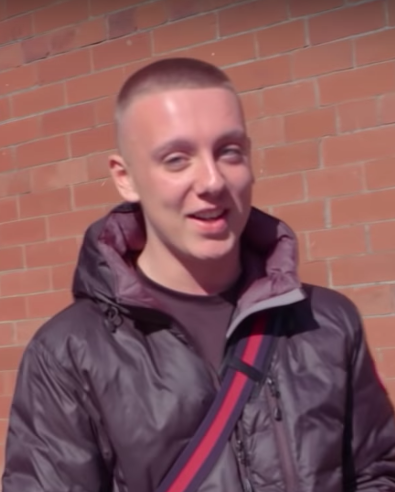
Aitch (upcoming in 15)

=== Line-up of Coaches ===
Coaches' line-up by chairs order
Series	Year	Coaches			
Series	Year	1	2	3	4
1	2012	will.i.am	Jessie J	Tom	Danny
2	2013	will.i.am	Jessie J	Tom	Danny
3	2014	will.i.am	Kylie	Tom	Ricky
4	2015	will.i.am	Rita	Tom	Ricky
5	2016	will.i.am	George	Paloma	Ricky
6	2017	will.i.am	JHud	Tom	Gavin
7	2018	will.i.am	JHud	Tom	Olly
8	2019	will.i.am	JHud	Tom	Olly
9	2020	will.i.am	Meghan	Tom	Olly
10	2021	will.i.am	Anne-Marie	Tom	Olly
11	2022	will.i.am	Anne-Marie	Tom	Olly
12	2023	will.i.am	Anne-Marie	Tom	Olly
13	2024	will.i.am	LeAnn	Tom	Tom & Danny
14	2026	will.i.am	Kelly	Tom	Tom & Danny
15	2027	will.i.am	Cheryl	Kelly	Aitch

== Presenters ==
The Voice UK was presented by Holly Willoughby and Reggie Yates during the first two series. In 2014, both stepped down from their roles and were replaced by Big Brother UK presenter Emma Willis and JLS band member Marvin Humes. Willoughby (series 1 and 2) and Willis (series 3 onwards) are the main presenters for the live shows, whilst Yates (series 1 and 2) and Humes (series 3 to 6) interview the contestants after their performances and are also social media correspondents. In June 2016, ITV confirmed that Willis would return to host the series, but would not be joined by Humes.

On 11 September 2026, it was announced that Willis would not return for the fifteenth series with Alesha Dixon and Stacey Solomon replacing her.

Presenters gallery

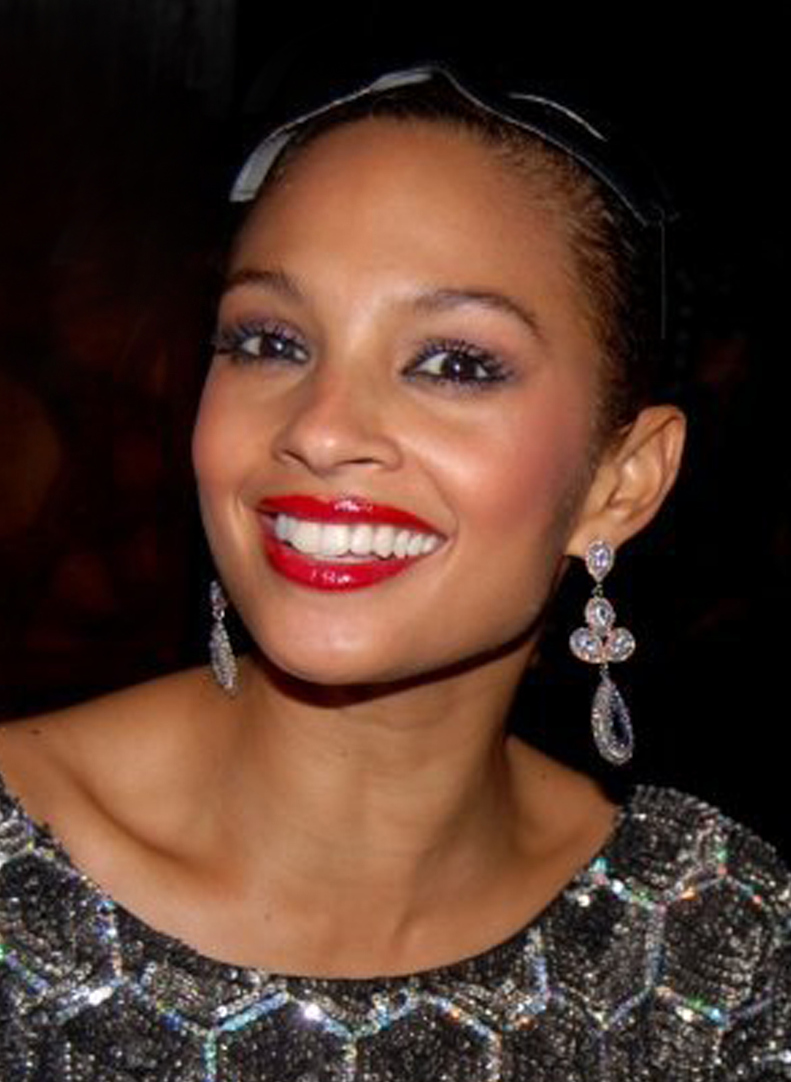
Alesha Dixon
(upcoming in 15)

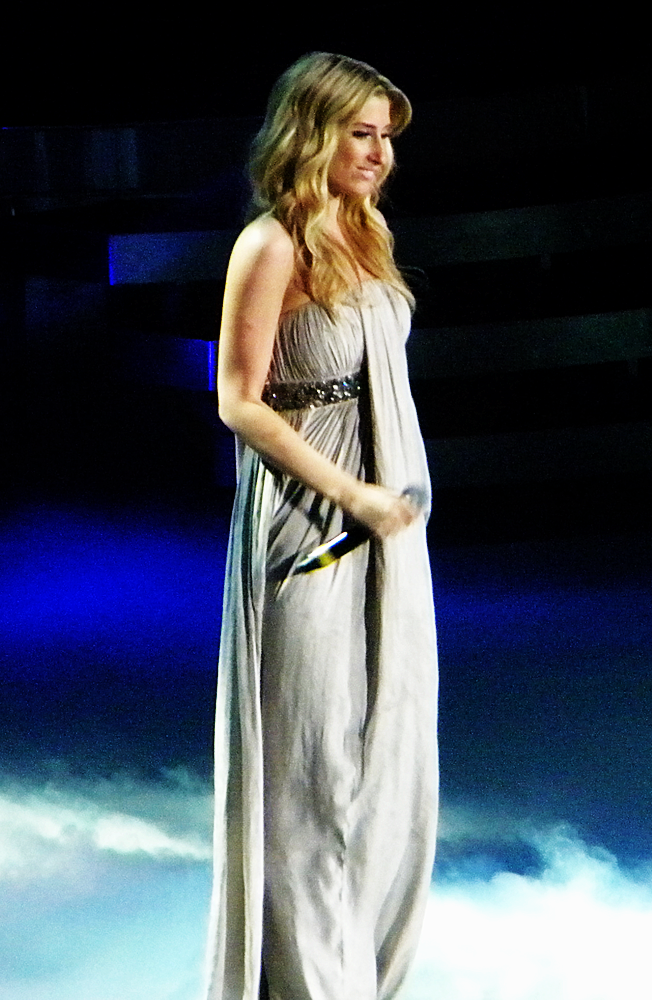
Stacey Solomon
(upcoming in 15)

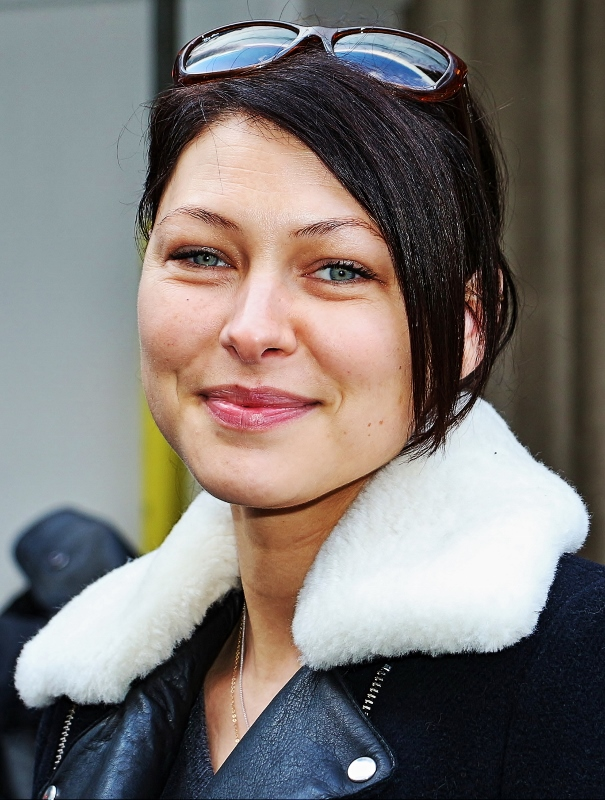
Emma Willis
(3–14)

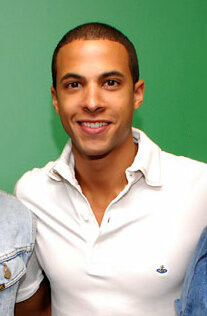
Marvin Humes
(3–5)

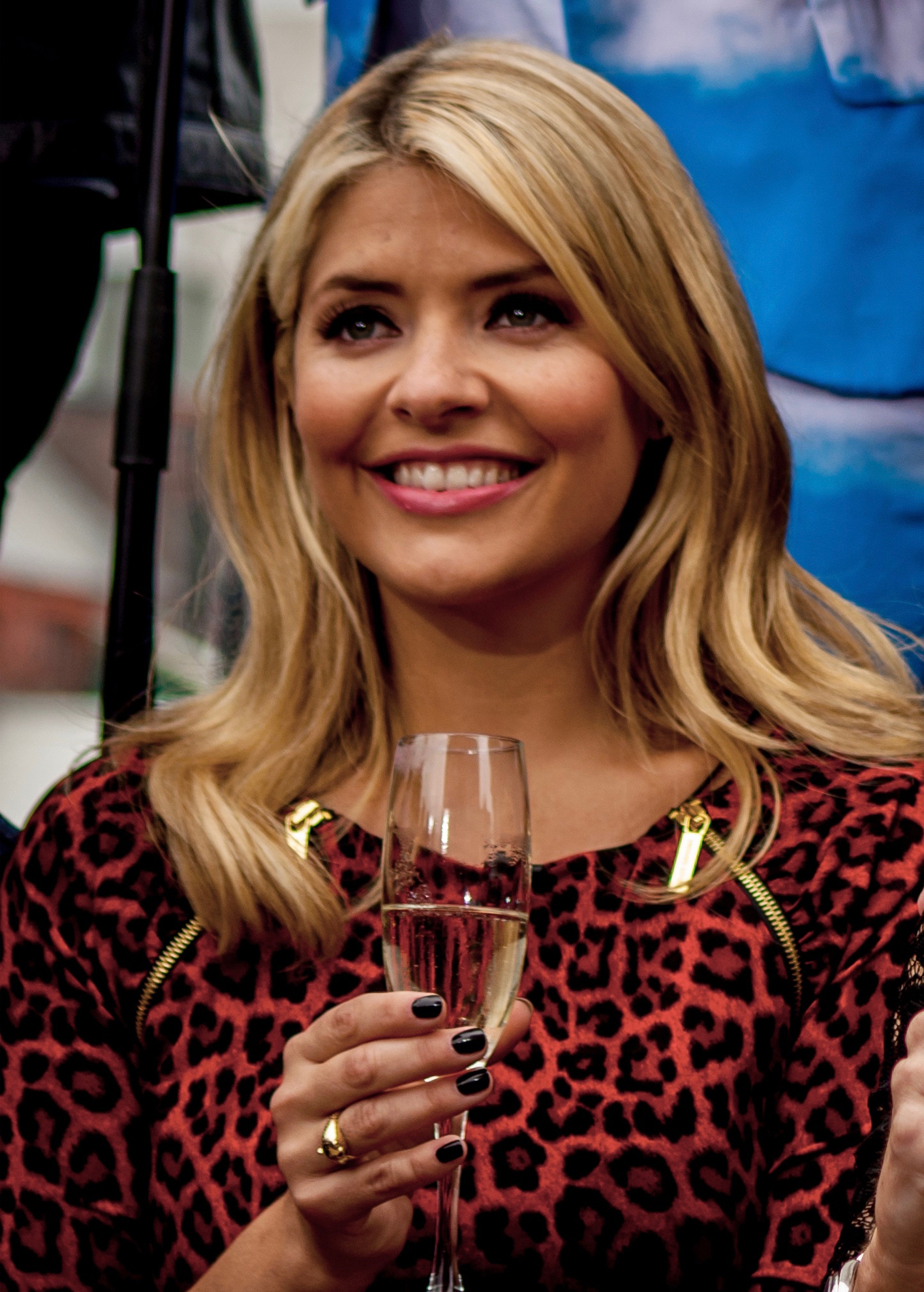
Holly Willoughby
(1–2)

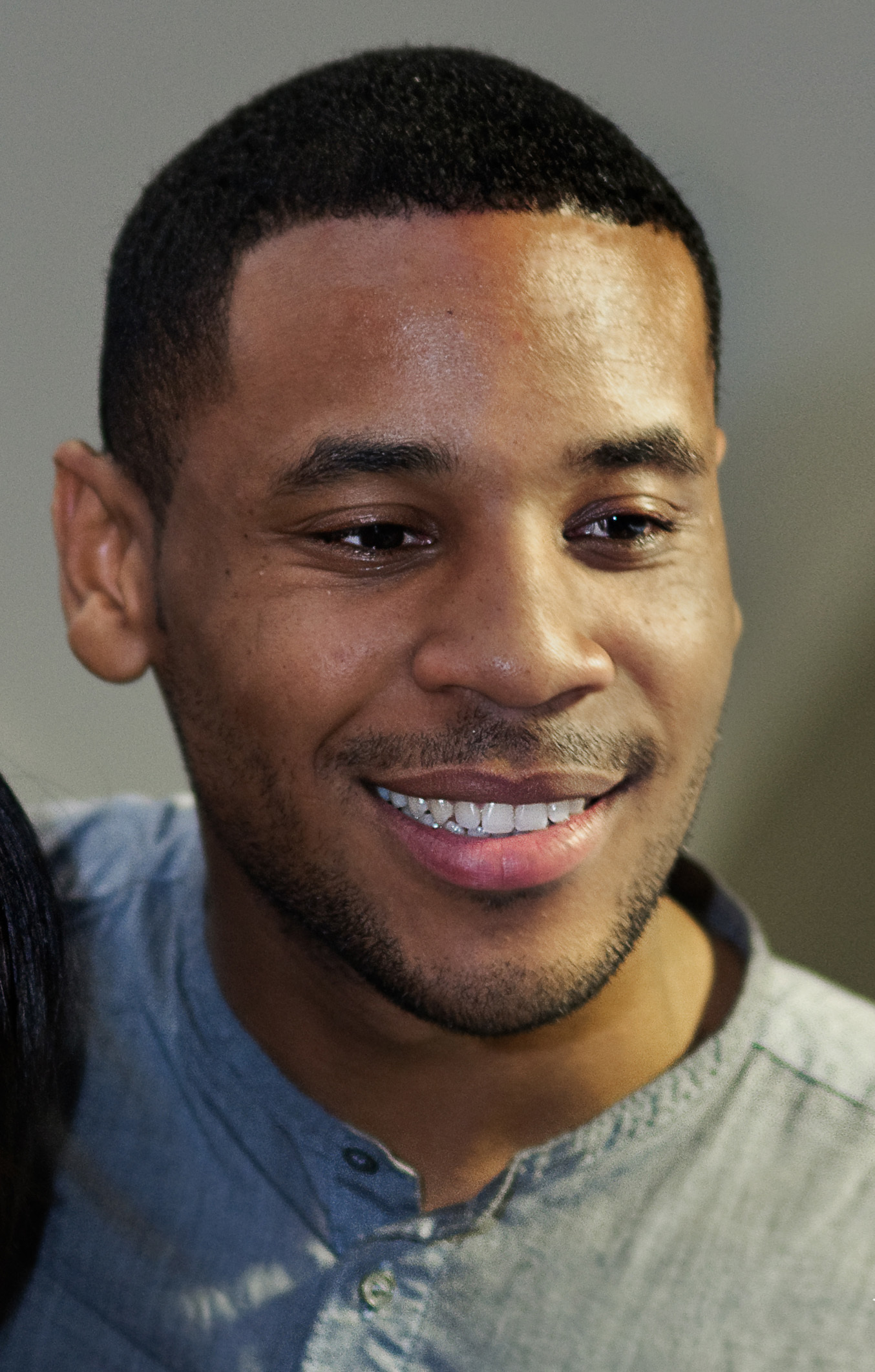
Reggie Yates
(1–2)

=== Timeline ===
==== Key ====
Main presenter
Backstage presenter
Contestant

Presenter	Series														
Presenter	1	2	3	4	5	6	7	8	9	10	11	12	13	14	15
Holly Willoughby															
Reggie Yates															
Emma Willis															
Marvin Humes															
Zoe Ball															
Cel Spellman															
Jamie Miller															
Vick Hope															
AJ Odudu															
Alesha Dixon															
Stacey Solomon															

== Coaches' teams and their artists ==
In each series, each coach chooses a number of acts to progress to the live shows. This table shows, for each series, which artists he or she put through to the live shows. In each series, artists advance to the final week of the live shows, either by team-based (in the first three series and from series nine onwards) or entirely by public voting (from series four to eight).

=== Key ===
- Winner
- Runner-up
- Third place
- Fourth place

Series	will.i.am	Jessie J	Sir Tom Jones	Danny O'Donoghue
1	Tyler James	Vince Kidd	Leanne Mitchell	Bo Bruce
1	Jaz Ellington	Becky Hill	Ruth Brown	Max Milner
1	Frances Wood	Cassius Henry	Adam Isaac	Aleks Josh
1	Joelle Moses	Toni Warne	Matt and Sueleen	David Julien
1	Sophie Griffin	Ruth-Ann St. Luce	Sam Buttery	Hannah Berney
2	Leah McFall	Matt Henry	Mike Ward	Andrea Begley
2	Cleo Higgins	Ash Morgan	Joseph Apostol	Karl Michael
2	Leanne Jarvis	Sarah Cassidy	Alys Williams	Mitchel Emms
3	will.i.am	Kylie Minogue	Sir Tom Jones	Ricky Wilson
3	Jermain Jackman	Jamie Johnson	Sally Barker	Christina Marie
3	Sophie-May Williams	Lee Glasson	Bizzi Dixon	Chris Royal
3	Iesher Haughton	Rachael O'Connor	Georgia Harrup	Emily Adams
4	will.i.am	Rita Ora	Sir Tom Jones	Ricky Wilson
4	Lucy O'Byrne	Joe Woolford	Sasha Simone	Stevie McCrorie
4	Sheena McHugh	Karis Thomas	Howard Rose	Emmanuel Nwamadi
4	Vikesh Champaneri	Clark Carmody	Lara Lee	Autumn Sharif
5	will.i.am	Boy George	Paloma Faith	Ricky Wilson
5	Lydia Lucy	Cody Frost	Heather Cameron-Hayes	Kevin Simm
5	Lyrickal	Vangelis Polydorou	Jordan Gray	Jolan
5	Lauren Lapsley-Browne	Harry Fisher	Beth Morris	Chloe Castro
6	will.i.am	Jennifer Hudson	Sir Tom Jones	Gavin Rossdale
6	Michelle John	Mo Adeniran	Into the Ark	Max Vickers
6	Jason Jones	Jamie Miller	Craig Ward	Truly Ford
6	Tanya Lacey	Jack Bruley	Nadine McGhee	Sarah Morgan
7	will.i.am	Jennifer Hudson	Sir Tom Jones	Olly Murs
7	Donel Mangena	Belle Voci	Ruti Olajugbagbe	Lauren Bannon
7	Tai	Gayatri Nair	Lucy Milburn	Jamie Grey
8
8	Emmanuel Smith	Nicole Dennis	Deana Walmsley	Molly Hocking
8	NXTGEN	Moya	Bethzienna Williams	Jimmy Balito
8			Cedric Neal	
9	will.i.am	Meghan Trainor	Sir Tom Jones	Olly Murs
9	Gevanni Hutton	Brooke Scullion	Jonny Brooks	Blessing Chitapa
9	Lucy Calcines	Trinity-Leigh Cooper	Lois Moodie	Jordan Phillips
9	Doug Sure			
10	will.i.am	Anne-Marie	Sir Tom Jones	Olly Murs
10	Okulaja	Craig Eddie	Hannah Williams	Grace Holden
10	Nadia Eide	Leona Jørgensen	Benjamin Warner	Jordan & Wesley
10	Jérémy Levif	Meg Birch	Leah Cobb	Andrew Bateup
10	BrokenPen	Wayne & Morgan	Jake O'Neill	Nathan Smoker
10	Adeniké	Stephanee Leal	Mariam Davina	Jason Hayles
10	Lauren Drew	Sweeney	Midé	Joe Topping
11
11	Naomi Johnson	Mark Howard	Anthonia Edwards	David Adeogun
11	Rain Castillo	Triniboi Joocie	Jake of Diamonds	Marc Halls
11	Noèva	Kai Benjamin	Rachel Modest	Shaka
12	Jen & Liv	Jolie Stevens	Callum Doignie	Hope Winter
12	Katie Coleman	Nia Ekanem	Bianca White	Stan Urban
12	THePETEBOX	Deja Vu	AV4C	Kelly Hastings
13	will.i.am	LeAnn Rimes	Sir Tom Jones	Tom Fletcher & Danny Jones
13	Storry	Deb Orah	Billy & Louie	AVA
13	ESNCE	Conor McLoughlin	Ace	Kyra Smith
13	MiC LOWRY	Lois Morgan Gay	Hollie Peabody	Olivia Rogers
14	will.i.am	Kelly Rowland	Sir Tom Jones	Tom Fletcher & Danny Jones
14	Naná Aldrin-Quaye	Monique Nicholson-Porter	Cate McHugh	Frank Raven
14	Diogo Ferreira	Aaren James	Amália Estradas	Ciiara Nyx
14	Sonna Rele	Lascel Wood	Molly J	Jack Algar

== Coaches' advisors ==
From the first series to the third series, and again from the eleventh series, the coaches worked with an advisor/two advisors in the battles/callbacks.

Series	Team will.i.am	Team Jessie	Team Tom	Team Danny
1	Dante Santiago	Ana Matronic	Cerys Matthews	Paloma Faith
2	Dante Santiago	Claude Kelly	Cerys Matthews	Dido
3	Team will.i.am	Team Kylie	Team Tom	Team Ricky
3	Dante Santiago & Leah McFall	Jake Shears	Tinie Tempah	Katy B
11	Team will.i.am	Team Anne-Marie	Team Tom	Team Olly
11	David Guetta	MNEK	Tom Grennan	James Arthur
12	Paloma Faith	Clara Amfo & Raye	Jamie Cullum	Luke Evans
13	Team will.i.am	Team LeAnn	Team Tom J.	Team Tom F. & Danny
13	Fyilicia^{1}	Griff	Hannah Waddingham	Perrie Edwards
14	Team will.i.am	Team Kelly	Team Tom J.	Team Tom F. & Danny
14	Cheryl	Delta Goodrem	Paloma Faith	Dougie Poynter & Harry Judd
15	Team will.i.am	Team Cheryl	Team Kelly	Team Aitch
15	Pixie Lott	Olly Alexander	Michelle Williams	Tom Grennan

Notes

^1 will.i.am used an AI mentor, named Fyilicia, as his advisor in the thirteenth series.

== Reception ==
The first series became BBC One's biggest new entertainment series on record with a consolidated series average of 9.2million/38.5% share. Across all episodes, including results shows, The Voice UK averaged 8.54m/36.3%. The second series suffered a lot from clashes with Britain's Got Talent and premiered 7.47 million viewers in the official ratings. It went on to have the most successful final, however, with 8 million tuning in. This series averaged 7.45m/26.8%.

From series 3 onwards, the show was moved to a January start to avoid clashes with Britain's Got Talent. This paid off as the 3rd series averaged a much higher viewership of 8.1m/31.6% and series 4 went on to average 8.55m/34.8% making it the most watched series to date. Series 5, the final series to air on the BBC, took a large fall in the ratings. It premiered with an official 7.87m, the second lowest to date. The reason behind this is thought to be the dramatic change in coaches after the fierce backlash from Tom Jones' axing. The new coaches were met with mixed reactions, although Boy George grew much more popular amongst viewers.

Series	Episodes (inc. results shows)	Series premiere	Series premiere viewing figures	Series finale	Series finale viewing figures	Average UK viewers in millions (inc. results shows)	Channel
1	17	24 March 2012	9.44	2 June 2012	7.82	8.54	BBC One
2	15	30 March 2013	7.47	22 June 2013	7.95	7.45	BBC One
3	15	11 January 2014	9.35	5 April 2014	7.15	8.10	BBC One
4	15	10 January 2015	9.05	4 April 2015	6.87	8.55	BBC One
5	15	9 January 2016	7.87	9 April 2016	5.12	6.49	BBC One
6	17	7 January 2017	7.12	2 April 2017	4.02	5.60	ITV1
7	14	6 January 2018	6.50	7 April 2018	5.87	6.04	ITV1
8	14	5 January 2019	6.54	6 April 2019	5.35	—N/a	ITV1
9	14	4 January 2020	5.50	14 November 2020	—N/a	—N/a	ITV1
10	12	2 January 2021	4.75	20 March 2021	4.61	4.86	ITV1
11	9	3 September 2022	4.06	29 October 2022	2.95	3.68	ITV1
12	9	4 November 2023	3.05	30 December 2023	3.18	2.95	ITV1
13	9	31 August 2024	2.97	26 October 2024	2.62	2.76	ITV1
14	10	22 August 2026	4 .89	31 October 2026	4.47	5.23	ITV1

=== Critical reception ===
In 2012, BBC Radio 2's Paul Gambaccini told Radio Times that The Voice is "karaoke" and claimed that while the American series was "fantastic to rejuvenate the careers of two of the coaches, Christina Aguilera and Maroon 5's Adam Levine, it didn't give us a viable artist". Mark Goodier also questioned the motives of Universal Music saying, "Universal have to be doing this because they want market share." On whether The Voice is to become a "huge hit" in the UK, he added, "It really depends on whether they find a star or not."

== International broadcast ==
On 23 December 2016, Irish commercial broadcaster TV3 announced that The Voice UK would be shown on the channel, after RTÉ One cancelled The Voice of Ireland in favour of Dancing with the Stars.

== Awards and nominations ==
Year	Award	Category	Result
2012	Glamour Awards	Presenter (Holly Willoughby)	Won
2012	TV Choice Awards	Best Talent Show	Nominated
2013	National Television Awards	Best Talent Show	Nominated
2014	National Television Awards	Best Talent Show	Nominated
2014	Glamour Awards	Presenter (Emma Willis)	Won
2015	National Television Awards	Best Talent Show	Nominated
2015	BAFTA Television Awards	Entertainment Programme	Nominated
2015	Glamour Awards	TV Personality (Rita Ora)	Won
2024	National Television Awards	Best Talent Show	Nominated
