= AVA (English singer) =

- Origin: Bristol
- Occupation: Singer
- Instrument: Vocals
- Label: Universal Music Group

Ava Mannings, known professionally as AVA, is an English singer. She won the thirteenth series of The Voice UK on 26 October 2024 at the age of 21.

== Career ==
=== 2024: The Voice UK ===
AVA participated in the thirteenth series of The Voice UK in 2024. In her blind audition, the show's four coaches (will.i.am, LeAnn Rimes, Sir Tom Jones, and duo Tom Fletcher & Danny Jones) turned their chairs. Ultimately AVA decided to join Tom & Danny's team. She was declared the winner of the series in the series final on 26 October 2024. After winning the series, her winning single, "The Long and Winding Road", was released. For winning the series, AVA won £50,000 and a holiday to Universal Orlando Resort.

Performed	Song	Original Artist	Result
Blind Audition	"D*mn Your Eyes"	Etta James	Joined Team Tom & Danny
Callbacks	"Smells Like Teen Spirit" (against Stan Buckroyd and Roisin McCarney)	Nirvana	Winner
Semi-Final	"God Only Knows"	The Beach Boys	Safe
Final	"The Long and Winding Road"	The Beatles	Winner
Final	"The Reason" (with Tom Fletcher & Danny Jones)	Hoobastank	Winner

== Personal life ==
AVA resides in Bristol where she works as a dog groomer.

== Discography ==
=== Singles ===
Title	Year	Album
"The Long and Winding Road"	2024	Non-album single

==== Promotional singles ====
Title	Year	Album
"The Reason" (featuring McFly)	2024	Non-album promotional single
