= Jen & Liv =

HUNNI
- Origin: North East England
- Occupation: Singers
- Instruments: Vocals
- Label: Universal Music Group

Jen & Liv, also known as HUNNI, are an English duo composed of singers Jenna Cole and Olivia Irvin. They won the twelfth series of The Voice UK, becoming the first duo to win the main show.

== Background ==
Cole describes the formation of Jen & Liv occurring "…at a Little Mix tribute but when we did meet properly it was genuinely like love at first sight."

Prior to competing on The Voice UK, the duo were buskers mainly in the Newcastle area of North East England.

== Career ==
=== 2023: The Voice UK ===
Jen & Liv participated in the twelfth series of The Voice UK in 2023. In their blind audition, the show's four coaches (will.i.am, Anne-Marie, Sir Tom Jones, and Olly Murs) turned their chairs. Ultimately Jen & Liv decided to join will.i.am's team. The duo has the distinction of being the first participant in the history of the show to have had the show's presenter, Emma Willis, press coach will.i.am's button, as will.i.am and Willis decided to swap places for the audition. They were declared the winner of the series in the series final on 30 December 2023. After winning the series, the duo's winning single, "I'm Every Woman", was released. For winning the series, the duo won £50,000 and a holiday to Mauritius.

Performed	Song	Original Artist	Result
Blind Audition	"Woman"	Doja Cat	Joined Team will.i.am
Callbacks	"ABCDEFU" (against Shane Brierley and Sese Foster)	Gayle	Winner
Semi-Final	"Sway"	Michael Bublé	Safe
Final	"I'm Every Woman"	Chaka Khan	Winner
Final	"Break My Soul" (with will.i.am)	Beyoncé	Winner

=== 2024–present: New name and music ===
Jen & Liv announced in February 2024 that they were to change their name as a duo after signing to Universal Music Group. The duo were later re-branded to HUNNI, updating their social media usernames and explaining that new music is on the way. The duo performed at Mouth Of The Tyne Festival on 14 July 2024, and supported Gabrielle at her Durham Cathedral show on 21 July 2024.

On 19 April 2024, HUNNI released the song "Heartbeat".

On 18 October 2024, HUNNI released the song "5 + 5". On 26 October 2024, they returned to The Voice UK stage to perform "Heartbeat" at the finale of the thirteenth series.

== Discography ==
=== Singles ===
Title	Year	Album
"I'm Every Woman"	2023	Non-album singles
"Heartbeat"	2024	Non-album singles
"5 + 5"	2024	Non-album singles
"—" denotes releases that did not chart or were not released in that territory.
