= List of The Voice UK contestants =

This is a list of contestants who have appeared on the reality television competition, The Voice UK since its inception in 2012. Only contestants successfully picked by a coach are included here.

== Contestants ==
Key:

Winner
Runner-up
Third/Fourth place
Fourth place
Eliminated by the public vote
Eliminated in the Live Shows
Eliminated in the Knockout Rounds
Eliminated in the Battle/Callbacks Rounds
Withdrew
Participating

Contestant	Age	Coach	Coach (After Steals)	Series	Number of performances	Finish
Jenny Jones	25	will.i.am	—N/a	1	2	Battle Rounds
Bill Downs	23	Danny O'Donoghue	—N/a	1	2	Battle Rounds
Aundrea Nyle	36	Sir Tom Jones	—N/a	1	2	Battle Rounds
Kirsten Joy	25	Jessie J	—N/a	1	2	Battle Rounds
Vince Freeman	34	Danny O'Donoghue	—N/a	1	2	Battle Rounds
Heshima Thompson	25	will.i.am	—N/a	1	2	Battle Rounds
Jessica Hammond	17	Jessie J	—N/a	1	2	Battle Rounds
Jay Norton	24	will.i.am	—N/a	1	2	Battle Rounds
Deniece Pearson	43	Sir Tom Jones	—N/a	1	2	Battle Rounds
David Faulkner	29	Jessie J	—N/a	1	2	Battle Rounds
Barbara Bryceland	49	Sir Tom Jones	—N/a	1	2	Battle Rounds
Kate Read	19	will.i.am	—N/a	1	2	Battle Rounds
Emmy J Mac	21	Danny O'Donoghue	—N/a	1	2	Battle Rounds
Ben Kelly	22	Jessie J	—N/a	1	2	Battle Rounds
Lindsey Butler	41	Sir Tom Jones	—N/a	1	2	Battle Rounds
Murray Hockridge	47	Danny O'Donoghue	—N/a	1	2	Battle Rounds
Indie & Pixie	17 & 18	Jessie J	—N/a	1	2	Battle Rounds
Denise Morgan	31	Sir Tom Jones	—N/a	1	2	Battle Rounds
J Marie Cooper	27	will.i.am	—N/a	1	2	Battle Rounds
John James Newman	33	Danny O'Donoghue	—N/a	1	2	Battle Rounds
Samuel Buttery	20	Sir Tom Jones	—N/a	1	3	Live Shows
Sophie Griffin	17	will.i.am	—N/a	1	3	Live Shows
Ruth-Ann St. Luce	18	Jessie J	—N/a	1	3	Live Shows
Hannah Berney	20	Danny O'Donoghue	—N/a	1	3	Live Shows
Matt & Sueleen	34 & 34	Sir Tom Jones	—N/a	1	4	Live Shows
Adam Issac	28	Sir Tom Jones	—N/a	1	4	Live Shows
Joelle Moses	21	will.i.am	—N/a	1	4	Live Shows
Frances Wood	18	will.i.am	—N/a	1	4	Live Shows
Toni Warne	34	Jessie J	—N/a	1	4	Live Shows
Cassius Henry	32	Jessie J	—N/a	1	4	Live Shows
Aleks Josh	17	Danny O'Donoghue	—N/a	1	4	Live Shows
David Julien	23	Danny O'Donoghue	—N/a	1	4	Live Shows
Max Milner	20	Danny O'Donoghue	—N/a	1	5	Live Shows
Becky Hill	18	Jessie J	—N/a	1	5	Live Shows
Ruth Brown	19	Sir Tom Jones	—N/a	1	5	Live Shows
Jaz Ellington	27	will.i.am	—N/a	1	5	Live Shows
Vince Kidd	22	Jessie J	—N/a	1	7	Fourth Place
Tyler James	27	will.i.am	—N/a	1	8	Runner-up
Bo Bruce	28	Danny O'Donoghue	—N/a	1	8	Runner-up
Leanne Mitchell	28	Sir Tom Jones	—N/a	1	8	Winner
LB Robinson	32	Sir Tom Jones	—N/a	2	2	Battle Rounds
Alice Barlow	21	Danny O'Donoghue	—N/a	2	2	Battle Rounds
Katie Benbow	20	Jessie J	—N/a	2	2	Battle Rounds
Nu-tarna	32 & 31	will.i.am	—N/a	2	2	Battle Rounds
Carla & Barbara	47 & 52	will.i.am	—N/a	2	2	Battle Rounds
Elise Evans	18	Sir Tom Jones	—N/a	2	2	Battle Rounds
De' Vide	24 & 33	Jessie J	—N/a	2	2	Battle Rounds
CJ Edwards	24	will.i.am	—N/a	2	2	Battle Rounds
Nate James	33	Jessie J	—N/a	2	2	Battle Rounds
Smith & Jones	19 & 20	Danny O'Donoghue	—N/a	2	2	Battle Rounds
Ricardo Afonso	38	Danny O'Donoghue	—N/a	2	2	Battle Rounds
Emma Jade Garbutt	18	Sir Tom Jones	—N/a	2	2	Battle Rounds
Diva	41 & 43	Sir Tom Jones	—N/a	2	2	Battle Rounds
Laura Oakes	22	Danny O'Donoghue	—N/a	2	2	Battle Rounds
Liam Tamne	27	will.i.am	—N/a	2	2	Battle Rounds
Lareena Mitchell	33	Sir Tom Jones	—N/a	2	2	Battle Rounds
Paul Carden	31	Danny O'Donoghue	—N/a	2	2	Battle Rounds
Emily Worton	18	will.i.am	—N/a	2	2	Battle Rounds
Colin Chisholm	60	Sir Tom Jones	—N/a	2	2	Battle Rounds
Nadeem Leigh	34	Danny O'Donoghue	—N/a	2	2	Battle Rounds
Jamie Bruce	34	Sir Tom Jones	—N/a	2	3	Knockout Rounds
Cherelle Basquine	25	Sir Tom Jones	—N/a	2	3	Knockout Rounds
Adam Barron	27	Jessie J	Sir Tom Jones	2	3	Knockout Rounds
Ragsy	34	Sir Tom Jones	—N/a	2	3	Knockout Rounds
Moni Tivony	32	will.i.am	—N/a	2	3	Knockout Rounds
Jordan Lee Davies	22	will.i.am	—N/a	2	3	Knockout Rounds
John Pritchard	31	will.i.am	—N/a	2	3	Knockout Rounds
Lem Knights	18	Jessie J	will.i.am	2	3	Knockout Rounds
Danny County	22	Jessie J	—N/a	2	3	Knockout Rounds
Trevor Francis	30	Jessie J	—N/a	2	3	Knockout Rounds
Letitia Grant-Brown	17	Jessie J	—N/a	2	3	Knockout Rounds
Lovelle Hill	22	Jessie J	—N/a	2	3	Knockout Rounds
Alex Buchanan	23	Jessie J	Danny O'Donoghue	2	3	Knockout Rounds
Abi Sampa	27	Danny O'Donoghue	—N/a	2	3	Knockout Rounds
Conor Scott	18	Danny O'Donoghue	—N/a	2	3	Knockout Rounds
Sean Rumsey	26	Danny O'Donoghue	—N/a	2	3	Knockout Rounds
Sarah Cassidy	32	Jessie J	—N/a	2	4	Live Shows
Alys Williams	25	Sir Tom Jones	—N/a	2	4	Live Shows
Mitchel Emms	19	Danny O'Donoghue	—N/a	2	4	Live Shows
Leanne Jarvis	24	will.i.am	—N/a	2	4	Live Shows
Ash Morgan	27	Jessie J	—N/a	2	5	Live Shows
Karl Michael	26	Danny O'Donoghue	—N/a	2	5	Live Shows
Cleo Higgins	30	will.i.am	—N/a	2	5	Live Shows
Joseph Apostol	21	Sir Tom Jones	—N/a	2	5	Live Shows
Matt Henry	34	will.i.am	Jessie J	2	7	Third Place
Mike Ward	22	Sir Tom Jones	—N/a	2	8	Runner-up
Leah McFall	23	will.i.am	—N/a	2	8	Runner-up
Andrea Begley	26	Danny O'Donoghue	—N/a	2	8	Winner
Sarah Eden-Winn	27	will.i.am	—N/a	3	2	Battle Rounds
Jimmy Weston	39	Kylie Minogue	—N/a	3	2	Battle Rounds
Talia Smith	31	Sir Tom Jones	—N/a	3	2	Battle Rounds
Tila & Tavelah	18 & 18	Ricky Wilson	—N/a	3	2	Battle Rounds
Kenny Thompson	29	Sir Tom Jones	—N/a	3	2	Battle Rounds
Tom Barnwell	26	will.i.am	—N/a	3	2	Battle Rounds
Kelsey-Beth Crossley	21	Ricky Wilson	—N/a	3	2	Battle Rounds
Mairead Conlon	31	Sir Tom Jones	—N/a	3	2	Battle Rounds
Nathan Amzi	32	Ricky Wilson	—N/a	3	2	Battle Rounds
Jamie Lovatt	24	Ricky Wilson	—N/a	3	2	Battle Rounds
Amelia O'Connell	16	Kylie Minogue	—N/a	3	2	Battle Rounds
Kiki deVille	40	will.i.am	—N/a	3	2	Battle Rounds
Vicky Jones	29	Sir Tom Jones	—N/a	3	2	Battle Rounds
Myles Evans	26	Ricky Wilson	—N/a	3	2	Battle Rounds
Cherrie Prince	33	will.i.am	—N/a	3	2	Battle Rounds
Joe Keegan	16	Kylie Minogue	—N/a	3	2	Battle Rounds
Leverne Scott-Roberts	31	Sir Tom Jones	—N/a	3	2	Battle Rounds
Gemyni	26 & 26	Kylie Minogue	—N/a	3	2	Battle Rounds
Elesha Paul Moses	32	Sir Tom Jones	—N/a	3	2	Battle Rounds
Luciee Marie Closier	16	Ricky Wilson	—N/a	3	2	Battle Rounds
Leo Ihenacho	36	Kylie Minogue	—N/a	3	3	Knockout Rounds
Jai McConnell	24	Kylie Minogue	—N/a	3	3	Knockout Rounds
Jade Mayjean Peters	21	Kylie Minogue	—N/a	3	3	Knockout Rounds
Femi Santiago	27	will.i.am	Kylie Minogue	3	3	Knockout Rounds
Celestine	30	Sir Tom Jones	—N/a	3	3	Knockout Rounds
Melissa Gill	21	Sir Tom Jones	—N/a	3	3	Knockout Rounds
Gary Poole	48	Sir Tom Jones	—N/a	3	3	Knockout Rounds
Steven Alexander	27	Kylie Minogue	Sir Tom Jones	3	3	Knockout Rounds
Jessica Steele	22	will.i.am	Ricky Wilson	3	3	Knockout Rounds
Beth McCarthy	16	Ricky Wilson	—N/a	3	3	Knockout Rounds
Jazz Bates-Chambers	17	Ricky Wilson	—N/a	3	3	Knockout Rounds
Max Murphy	18	Ricky Wilson	—N/a	3	3	Knockout Rounds
James Byron	24	will.i.am	—N/a	3	3	Knockout Rounds
Callum Crowley	22	will.i.am	—N/a	3	3	Knockout Rounds
Anna McLuckie	16	will.i.am	—N/a	3	3	Knockout Rounds
Nomakhosi Nkosi	22	Kylie Minogue	will.i.am	3	3	Knockout Rounds
Iesher Haughton	19	will.i.am	—N/a	3	4	Live Shows
Rachael O'Connor	16	Kylie Minogue	—N/a	3	4	Live Shows
Georgia Harrup	27	Sir Tom Jones	—N/a	3	4	Live Shows
Emily Adams	18	Ricky Wilson	—N/a	3	4	Live Shows
Bizzi Dixon	42	Sir Tom Jones	—N/a	3	5	Live Shows
Chris Royal	25	Ricky Wilson	—N/a	3	5	Live Shows
Lee Glasson	31	Kylie Minogue	—N/a	3	5	Live Shows
Sophie May Williams	17	will.i.am	—N/a	3	5	Live Shows
Jamie Johnson	19	Kylie Minogue	—N/a	3	7	Fourth Place
Sally Barker	54	Sir Tom Jones	—N/a	3	8	Runner-up
Christina Marie	20	Ricky Wilson	—N/a	3	8	Runner-up
Jermain Jackman	19	will.i.am	—N/a	3	8	Winner
Jade Hewitt	27	Ricky Wilson	—N/a	4	2	Battle Rounds
Rozzy	33	will.i.am	—N/a	4	2	Battle Rounds
Roisin Geraghty-McDonagh	31	Sir Tom Jones	—N/a	4	2	Battle Rounds
Morven Brown	17	Rita Ora	—N/a	4	2	Battle Rounds
Stephanie Webber	25	Sir Tom Jones	—N/a	4	2	Battle Rounds
Tim Arnold	39	Ricky Wilson	—N/a	4	2	Battle Rounds
Stephen Cornwell	21	will.i.am	—N/a	4	2	Battle Rounds
Vanessa Hunt	26	Rita Ora	—N/a	4	2	Battle Rounds
Cai Williams	34	Sir Tom Jones	—N/a	4	2	Battle Rounds
Hollie Barrie	30	will.i.am	—N/a	4	2	Battle Rounds
Andrew Marc	48	will.i.am	—N/a	4	2	Battle Rounds
The Mac Bros	24 & 24	Rita Ora	—N/a	4	2	Battle Rounds
Lisa Ward	26	Sir Tom Jones	—N/a	4	2	Battle Rounds
NK	21	Rita Ora	—N/a	4	2	Battle Rounds
Kim Alvord	24	Sir Tom Jones	—N/a	4	2	Battle Rounds
Classical Reflection	19 & 19	Ricky Wilson	—N/a	4	2	Battle Rounds
DTwinz	23 & 23	Rita Ora	—N/a	4	3	Knockout Rounds
Mitch Miller	26	Rita Ora	—N/a	4	3	Knockout Rounds
Shellyann	26	Ricky Wilson	Rita Ora	4	3	Knockout Rounds
Hannah Wildes	24	Ricky Wilson	Rita Ora	4	3	Knockout Rounds
Liss Jones	24	Rita Ora	—N/a	4	3	Knockout Rounds
Newtion Matthews	30	will.i.am	—N/a	4	3	Knockout Rounds
Jake Shakeshaft	19	will.i.am	—N/a	4	3	Knockout Rounds
Brooklyn	19	will.i.am	—N/a	4	3	Knockout Rounds
Esmée Denters	26	will.i.am	—N/a	4	3	Knockout Rounds
Ryan Green	17	Rita Ora	will.i.am	4	3	Knockout Rounds
Christina Matovu	24	Ricky Wilson	—N/a	4	3	Knockout Rounds
Olivia Lawson	17	Rita Ora	Ricky Wilson	4	3	Knockout Rounds
Hannah Symons	26	Ricky Wilson	—N/a	4	3	Knockout Rounds
Letitia George	24	Ricky Wilson	—N/a	4	3	Knockout Rounds
Claudia Rose	17	Sir Tom Jones	Ricky Wilson	4	3	Knockout Rounds
Joyful Soundz	39 & 34	will.i.am	Sir Tom Jones	4	3	Knockout Rounds
Karl Loxley	24	will.i.am	Sir Tom Jones	4	3	Knockout Rounds
Rosa Iamele	16	Sir Tom Jones	—N/a	4	3	Knockout Rounds
Daniel Duke	24	Sir Tom Jones	—N/a	4	3	Knockout Rounds
Sharon Murphy	52	Sir Tom Jones	—N/a	4	3	Knockout Rounds
Autumn Sharif	19	Ricky Wilson	—N/a	4	4	Live Shows
Lara Lee	29	Sir Tom Jones	—N/a	4	4	Live Shows
Howard Rose	27	Sir Tom Jones	—N/a	4	4	Live Shows
Clark Carmody	26	Rita Ora	—N/a	4	4	Live Shows
Vikesh Champaneri	19	Ricky Wilson	will.i.am	4	5	Live Shows
Sheena McHugh	26	will.i.am	—N/a	4	5	Live Shows
Joe Woolford	19	Rita Ora	—N/a	4	5	Live Shows
Karis Thomas	16	Rita Ora	—N/a	4	5	Live Shows
Sasha Simone	25	Sir Tom Jones	—N/a	4	7	Third Place
Emmanuel Nwamadi	23	Ricky Wilson	—N/a	4	7	Third Place
Lucy O'Byrne	23	will.i.am	—N/a	4	9	Runner-up
Stevie McCrorie	29	Ricky Wilson	—N/a	4	9	Winner
JJ Soulx	25	Paloma Faith	—N/a	5	1	Withdrew
Irene Alano-Rhodes	42	will.i.am	—N/a	5	2	Battle Rounds
Charley Birkin	52	Boy George	—N/a	5	2	Battle Rounds
Efe Udugba	31	Ricky Wilson	—N/a	5	2	Battle Rounds
Scott and Vicki	23 & 24	will.i.am	—N/a	5	2	Battle Rounds
Tobias Robertson	22	Boy George	—N/a	5	2	Battle Rounds
Tom Milner	24	Ricky Wilson	—N/a	5	2	Battle Rounds
J Sealy	43	Boy George	—N/a	5	2	Battle Rounds
Vivica Jade	27	will.i.am	—N/a	5	2	Battle Rounds
David Barnes	37	Ricky Wilson	—N/a	5	2	Battle Rounds
Melissa Cavanagh	25	Boy George	—N/a	5	2	Battle Rounds
Janine Dyer	38	Ricky Wilson	—N/a	5	2	Battle Rounds
Colleen Gormley	28	will.i.am	—N/a	5	2	Battle Rounds
Megan Reece	28	Paloma Faith	—N/a	5	2	Battle Rounds
Mari Marli	23	will.i.am	—N/a	5	2	Battle Rounds
Áine Carroll	16	Ricky Wilson	—N/a	5	2	Battle Rounds
Steve Devereux	60	Paloma Faith	—N/a	5	2	Battle Rounds
Deano Boroczky	27	Paloma Faith	—N/a	5	3	Knockout Rounds
Rick Snowdon	29	Paloma Faith	—N/a	5	3	Knockout Rounds
Aaron Hill	24	will.i.am	Paloma Faith	5	3	Knockout Rounds
Dwaine Hayden	30	Paloma Faith	—N/a	5	3	Knockout Rounds
Faith Nelson	17	Paloma Faith	—N/a	5	3	Knockout Rounds
Brooklynne Richards	23	Ricky Wilson	—N/a	5	3	Knockout Rounds
Aliesha Lobuczek	17	Paloma Faith	Ricky Wilson	5	3	Knockout Rounds
Rachel Ann	16	Ricky Wilson	—N/a	5	3	Knockout Rounds
Kagan	17	Ricky Wilson	—N/a	5	3	Knockout Rounds
Mia Sylvester	28	Ricky Wilson	—N/a	5	3	Knockout Rounds
Alaric Green	21	Ricky Wilson	Boy George	5	3	Knockout Rounds
Laura Begley	22	Boy George	—N/a	5	3	Knockout Rounds
Bradley Waterman	19	Paloma Faith	Boy George	5	3	Knockout Rounds
Leighton Jones	41	Boy George	—N/a	5	3	Knockout Rounds
Chase Morton	30	Boy George	—N/a	5	3	Knockout Rounds
Faheem	21	will.i.am	—N/a	5	3	Knockout Rounds
Charley Blue	24	will.i.am	—N/a	5	3	Knockout Rounds
Theo Llewellyn	26	Paloma Faith	will.i.am	5	3	Knockout Rounds
Tom Rickels	22	will.i.am	—N/a	5	3	Knockout Rounds
Eli Cripps	28	Boy George	will.i.am	5	3	Knockout Rounds
Chloe Castro	19	Ricky Wilson	—N/a	5	3	Withdrew
Beth Morris	25	Paloma Faith	—N/a	5	3	Withdrew
Harry Fisher	18	Boy George	—N/a	5	4	Live Shows
Lauren Lapsley-Browne	18	will.i.am	—N/a	5	4	Live Shows
Vangelis Polydorou	24	Boy George	—N/a	5	5	Live Shows
Lyrickal	46	will.i.am	—N/a	5	5	Live Shows
Jordan Gray	26	Paloma Faith	—N/a	5	5	Live Shows
Heather Cameron-Hayes	16	Boy George	Paloma Faith	5	5	Live Shows
Cody Frost	17	Boy George	—N/a	5	7	Third Place
Lydia Lucy	22	will.i.am	—N/a	5	7	Third Place
Jolan	21	Ricky Wilson	—N/a	5	8	Runner-up
Kevin Simm	35	Paloma Faith	Ricky Wilson	5	8	Winner
Israel Allen	26	Jennifer Hudson	—N/a	6	2	Battle Rounds
Shakira Lueshing	28	will.i.am	—N/a	6	2	Battle Rounds
Bosie	21	Gavin Rossdale	—N/a	6	2	Battle Rounds
Charlie Drew	28	Sir Tom Jones	—N/a	6	2	Battle Rounds
Millicent Weaver	18	Gavin Rossdale	—N/a	6	2	Battle Rounds
Stacey Skeete	27	Jennifer Hudson	—N/a	6	2	Battle Rounds
Hadleigh Ford	38	Gavin Rossdale	—N/a	6	2	Battle Rounds
Lucy Kane	20	Sir Tom Jones	—N/a	6	2	Battle Rounds
Jazmin Sawyers	22	will.i.am	—N/a	6	2	Battle Rounds
Kit Rice	25	Jennifer Hudson	—N/a	6	2	Battle Rounds
Rhyann Thomas	28	Sir Tom Jones	—N/a	6	2	Battle Rounds
Liza Baker	44	Jennifer Hudson	—N/a	6	2	Battle Rounds
Septimus Prime	19	Sir Tom Jones	—N/a	6	2	Battle Rounds
Lawrence Hill	25	will.i.am	—N/a	6	2	Battle Rounds
Linda Jennings	49	Sir Tom Jones	—N/a	6	2	Battle Rounds
Ruth Lockwood	25	Gavin Rossdale	—N/a	6	2	Battle Rounds
David Jackson	29	Jennifer Hudson	—N/a	6	3	Knockout Rounds
Tim Gallagher	23	will.i.am	Jennifer Hudson	6	3	Knockout Rounds
Georgie Braggins	21	Jennifer Hudson	—N/a	6	3	Knockout Rounds
Victoria Kerley	16	will.i.am	Sir Tom Jones	6	3	Knockout Rounds
Capital B	20 & 21	Sir Tom Jones	—N/a	6	3	Knockout Rounds
Dannii Barnes	20	Sir Tom Jones	—N/a	6	3	Knockout Rounds
Hayley Eccles	22	will.i.am	—N/a	6	3	Knockout Rounds
Lia White	17	will.i.am	—N/a	6	3	Knockout Rounds
Clara Hurtado	20	will.i.am	—N/a	6	3	Knockout Rounds
Diamond	18	Jennifer Hudson	Gavin Rossdale	6	3	Knockout Rounds
Carter	29	Gavin Rossdale	—N/a	6	3	Knockout Rounds
Keziah Rodell	20	Gavin Rossdale	—N/a	6	3	Knockout Rounds
Jack Bruley	20	Jennifer Hudson	—N/a	6	4	Live Shows
Nadine McGhee	18	Sir Tom Jones	—N/a	6	4	Live Shows
Sarah Morgan	16	Gavin Rossdale	—N/a	6	4	Live Shows
Tanya Lacey	31	Gavin Rossdale	will.i.am	6	4	Live Shows
Jason Jones	31	will.i.am	—N/a	6	5	Live Shows
Truly Ford	22	Gavin Rossdale	—N/a	6	5	Live Shows
Max Vickers	24	Gavin Rossdale	—N/a	6	5	Live Shows
Craig Ward	31	Sir Tom Jones	—N/a	6	5	Live Shows
Michelle John	43	will.i.am	—N/a	6	7	Fourth Place
Jamie Miller	19	Jennifer Hudson	—N/a	6	8	Third Place
Into the Ark	20 & 25	Sir Tom Jones	—N/a	6	9	Runner-up
Mo Adeniran	21	Jennifer Hudson	—N/a	6	9	Winner
Chris James	28	Olly Murs	—N/a	7	2	Battle Rounds
Courtney O'Neil	21	Sir Tom Jones	—N/a	7	2	Battle Rounds
Loaded Sista	30 & 34	will.i.am	—N/a	7	2	Battle Rounds
Scarlett Quigley	20	Jennifer Hudson	—N/a	7	2	Battle Rounds
Simon Davies	30	Sir Tom Jones	—N/a	7	2	Battle Rounds
RYT	24 & 30	Olly Murs	—N/a	7	2	Battle Rounds
Jilly Riley	35	Jennifer Hudson	—N/a	7	2	Battle Rounds
Harri Oakland	19	Jennifer Hudson	—N/a	7	2	Battle Rounds
Chloe Jones	22	Sir Tom Jones	—N/a	7	2	Battle Rounds
Bailey Nelsen	18	Olly Murs	—N/a	7	2	Battle Rounds
Tesni Jones	32	Jennifer Hudson	—N/a	7	2	Battle Rounds
Debbie Aramide	29	Olly Murs	—N/a	7	2	Battle Rounds
Ant & Ox	21 & 21	Jennifer Hudson	—N/a	7	2	Battle Rounds
Ivy Paige	37	Olly Murs	—N/a	7	2	Battle Rounds
Wesu Wallace	36	will.i.am	—N/a	7	2	Battle Rounds
Jade Williams	32	Sir Tom Jones	—N/a	7	2	Battle Rounds
Kade Smith	16	will.i.am	Olly Murs	7	3	Knockout Rounds
Holly Ellison	23	Olly Murs	—N/a	7	3	Knockout Rounds
Paige Young	25	will.i.am	—N/a	7	3	Knockout Rounds
Anna Willison Holt	17	will.i.am	—N/a	7	3	Knockout Rounds
Jake Benson	26	Jennifer Hudson	—N/a	7	3	Knockout Rounds
Ross Anderson	17	Jennifer Hudson	—N/a	7	3	Knockout Rounds
Kalon Rae	30	Sir Tom Jones	—N/a	7	3	Knockout Rounds
Eliza Gutteridge	16	Sir Tom Jones	—N/a	7	3	Knockout Rounds
Saskia Eng	16	Sir Tom Jones	will.i.am	7	3	Knockout Rounds
Mark Asari	28	will.i.am	—N/a	7	3	Knockout Rounds
Chantelle Nandi	29	will.i.am	Sir Tom Jones	7	3	Knockout Rounds
Wayne Ellington	46	Sir Tom Jones	—N/a	7	3	Knockout Rounds
Rhianna Abrey	20	will.i.am	Jennifer Hudson	7	3	Knockout Rounds
Jason Nicholson-Porter	33	Jennifer Hudson	—N/a	7	3	Knockout Rounds
Kirby Frost	17	Olly Murs	—N/a	7	3	Knockout Rounds
Shane McCormack	21	Olly Murs	—N/a	7	3	Knockout Rounds
Tai	18	will.i.am	—N/a	7	4	Live Shows
Lucy Milburn	20	Sir Tom Jones	—N/a	7	4	Live Shows
Gayatri Nair	16	Jennifer Hudson	—N/a	7	4	Live Shows
Jamie Grey	29	Olly Murs	—N/a	7	4	Live Shows
Lauren Bannon	27	Olly Murs	—N/a	7	6	Fourth Place
Belle Voci	25 & 26	Jennifer Hudson	—N/a	7	6	Third Place
Donel Mangena	16	will.i.am	—N/a	7	7	Runner-up
Ruti Olajugbagbe	18	Sir Tom Jones	—N/a	7	7	Winner
Mike Platt	32	Sir Tom Jones	—N/a	8	2	Battle Rounds
Brieya May	16	will.i.am	—N/a	8	2	Battle Rounds
Kieron Smith	26	Jennifer Hudson	—N/a	8	2	Battle Rounds
Nyema Kalfon	22	will.i.am	—N/a	8	2	Battle Rounds
Flat Pack	36–43	Olly Murs	—N/a	8	2	Battle Rounds
Khadija	21	will.i.am	—N/a	8	2	Battle Rounds
Seth Oraeki	17	will.i.am	—N/a	8	2	Battle Rounds
Gisela Green	27	Jennifer Hudson	—N/a	8	2	Battle Rounds
Peter Donegan	35	Sir Tom Jones	—N/a	8	2	Battle Rounds
Marina Simioni	27	Sir Tom Jones	—N/a	8	2	Battle Rounds
Nikki Ambers	22	Olly Murs	—N/a	8	2	Battle Rounds
Grace Latchford	17	Sir Tom Jones	—N/a	8	2	Battle Rounds
Craig Forsyth	28	Jennifer Hudson	—N/a	8	2	Battle Rounds
Shivon Kane	19	will.i.am	—N/a	8	2	Battle Rounds
Lauren Hope	20	Olly Murs	—N/a	8	2	Battle Rounds
Luke Swatman	35	Jennifer Hudson	—N/a	8	2	Battle Rounds
Roger Samuels	43	Sir Tom Jones	—N/a	8	3	Knockout Rounds
Equip To Overcome	20	Sir Tom Jones	—N/a	8	3	Knockout Rounds
Connie Lamb	17	Olly Murs	Jennifer Hudson	8	3	Knockout Rounds
Sarah Tucker	34	Jennifer Hudson	—N/a	8	3	Knockout Rounds
Callum Butterworth	17	Olly Murs	will.i.am	8	3	Knockout Rounds
Gabriel Dryss	16	will.i.am	—N/a	8	3	Knockout Rounds
Eva Campbell	16	Olly Murs	—N/a	8	3	Knockout Rounds
Harrisen Larner-Main	25	Olly Murs	—N/a	8	3	Knockout Rounds
Georgia Bray	21	Olly Murs	—N/a	8	3	Knockout Rounds
Stefan Mahendra	23	Olly Murs	—N/a	8	3	Knockout Rounds
Remember Monday	24	Jennifer Hudson	—N/a	8	3	Knockout Rounds
Bukky Oronti	16	Jennifer Hudson	—N/a	8	3	Knockout Rounds
Ilianna	21	will.i.am	—N/a	8	3	Knockout Rounds
Christina Ellinas	27	will.i.am	—N/a	8	3	Knockout Rounds
Ayanam Udoma	27	Sir Tom Jones	—N/a	8	3	Knockout Rounds
Cedric Neal	43	Sir Tom Jones	—N/a	8	4	Live Shows
Emmanuel Smith	29	will.i.am	—N/a	8	4	Live Shows
Moya	27	Jennifer Hudson	—N/a	8	4	Live Shows
Nicole Dennis	24	Jennifer Hudson	—N/a	8	4	Live Shows
NXTGEN	21	will.i.am	—N/a	8	4	Live Shows
Bethzienna Williams	28	Jennifer Hudson	Sir Tom Jones	8	6	Fourth Place
Jimmy Balito	23	Sir Tom Jones	Olly Murs	8	6	Third Place
Deana Walmsley	23	Sir Tom Jones	—N/a	8	7	Runner-up
Molly Hocking	17	Olly Murs	—N/a	8	7	Winner
Bleu Woodward	32	Olly Murs	—N/a	9	2	Battle Rounds
Zindzi Thomas	31	will.i.am	—N/a	9	2	Battle Rounds
Lara Anstead	26	Sir Tom Jones	—N/a	9	2	Battle Rounds
Dean John-Wilson	30	Meghan Trainor	—N/a	9	2	Battle Rounds
Evergreen	18–19	will.i.am	—N/a	9	2	Battle Rounds
Sean Connolly	30	Sir Tom Jones	—N/a	9	2	Battle Rounds
Alia Lara	19	will.i.am	—N/a	9	2	Battle Rounds
Holly Scally	16	Meghan Trainor	—N/a	9	2	Battle Rounds
Shaun Samonini	33	Sir Tom Jones	—N/a	9	2	Battle Rounds
Millie Bowell	23	Olly Murs	—N/a	9	2	Battle Rounds
Vivienne Isebor	26	Sir Tom Jones	—N/a	9	2	Battle Rounds
Katie & Aoife	16 & 16	Meghan Trainor	—N/a	9	2	Battle Rounds
Lara George	32	Sir Tom Jones	—N/a	9	2	Battle Rounds
Brian Corbett	29	Olly Murs	—N/a	9	2	Battle Rounds
Belle Noir	Various	Olly Murs	—N/a	9	2	Battle Rounds
Shauna Byrne	16	will.i.am	—N/a	9	2	Battle Rounds
So Diva	Various	will.i.am	Sir Tom Jones	9	3	Knockout Rounds
Zion	26	Sir Tom Jones	—N/a	9	3	Knockout Rounds
Cat Cavelli	29	Olly Murs	—N/a	9	3	Knockout Rounds
Cameo Williams	18	Olly Murs	—N/a	9	3	Knockout Rounds
Claudillea Holloway	24	Meghan Trainor	will.i.am	9	3	Knockout Rounds
Baby Sol	36	will.i.am	—N/a	9	3	Knockout Rounds
Blaize China	21	Meghan Trainor	—N/a	9	3	Knockout Rounds
Darci Wilders	18	Meghan Trainor	—N/a	9	3	Knockout Rounds
ShezAr	31	Sir Tom Jones	—N/a	9	3	Knockout Rounds
Elly O'Keeffe	31	Sir Tom Jones	—N/a	9	3	Knockout Rounds
Beryl McCormack	22	Olly Murs	Meghan Trainor	9	3	Knockout Rounds
Oli Ross	21	Meghan Trainor	—N/a	9	3	Knockout Rounds
Alan Chan	40	Olly Murs	—N/a	9	3	Knockout Rounds
Ty Lewis	18	Olly Murs	—N/a	9	3	Knockout Rounds
Johannes Pietsch	18	will.i.am	—N/a	9	3	Knockout Rounds
Doug Sure	31	will.i.am	—N/a	9	4	Live Shows
Jordan Phillips	20	Meghan Trainor	Olly Murs	9	4	Live Shows
Lois Moodie	21	Sir Tom Jones	—N/a	9	4	Live Shows
Lucy Calcines	21	will.i.am	—N/a	9	4	Live Shows
Trinity-Leigh Cooper	16	Meghan Trainor	—N/a	9	4	Live Shows
Gevanni Hutton	17	will.i.am	—N/a	9	4	Fourth Place
Brooke Scullion	20	Meghan Trainor	—N/a	9	4	Third Place
Jonny Brooks	28	Sir Tom Jones	—N/a	9	4	Runner-up
Blessing Chitapa	17	Olly Murs	—N/a	9	4	Winner
Kezia	33	will.i.am	—N/a	10	2	Battle Rounds
Sami Nathan	31	Sir Tom Jones	—N/a	10	2	Battle Rounds
Chanel Yates	21	Anne-Marie	—N/a	10	2	Battle Rounds
Benjamin Haycock	24	will.i.am	—N/a	10	2	Battle Rounds
Alex Harry	27	Olly Murs	—N/a	10	2	Battle Rounds
2ché	27	Sir Tom Jones	—N/a	10	2	Battle Rounds
Tascha Jerawan	21	Olly Murs	—N/a	10	2	Battle Rounds
Chantelle Padden	24	Olly Murs	—N/a	10	2	Battle Rounds
Okulaja	17	will.i.am	—N/a	10	2	Battle Rounds
Esther Cole	21	Sir Tom Jones	—N/a	10	2	Battle Rounds
Jake O'Neill	23	Sir Tom Jones	—N/a	10	2	Battle Rounds
James Robb	27	Anne-Marie	—N/a	10	2	Battle Rounds
Matt Croke	33	Olly Murs	—N/a	10	2	Battle Rounds
Cameron Ledwidge	18	Anne-Marie	—N/a	10	2	Battle Rounds
Victoria Heath	37	will.i.am	—N/a	10	2	Battle Rounds
Psalm Harmony	20–24	Sir Tom Jones	—N/a	10	2	Battle Rounds
Janel Antoneshia	27	will.i.am	—N/a	10	2	Withdrew
Wura	31	Sir Tom Jones	—N/a	10	2	Withdrew
Lauren Drew	27	Anne-Marie	will.i.am	10	3	Semi-Finals
Adeniké	28	will.i.am	—N/a	10	3	Semi-Finals
Midé	33	Sir Tom Jones	—N/a	10	3	Semi-Finals
Mariam Davina	18	Sir Tom Jones	—N/a	10	3	Semi-Finals
Sweeney	30	Anne-Marie	—N/a	10	3	Semi-Finals
Stephanee Leal	25	will.i.am	Anne-Marie	10	3	Semi-Finals
Joe Topping	42	Olly Murs	—N/a	10	3	Semi-Finals
Jason Hayles	34	Anne-Marie	Olly Murs	10	3	Semi-Finals
Nathan Smoker	20	Olly Murs	—N/a	10	3	Semi-Finals
Andrew Bateup	31	Olly Murs	—N/a	10	3	Semi-Finals
Leah Cobb	16	Olly Murs	Sir Tom Jones	10	3	Semi-Finals
Jake O'Neill	27	Sir Tom Jones	—N/a	10	3	Semi-Finals
Jérémy Levif	29	will.i.am	—N/a	10	3	Semi-Finals
BrokenPen	28	will.i.am	—N/a	10	3	Semi-Finals
Wayne & Morgan	32–43	Anne-Marie	—N/a	10	3	Semi-Finals
Meg Birch	25	Anne-Marie	—N/a	10	3	Semi-Finals
Benjamin Warner	23	Sir Tom Jones	—N/a	10	3	Public Vote
Nadia Eide	32	will.i.am	—N/a	10	3	Public Vote
Leona Jørgensen	26	Anne-Marie	—N/a	10	3	Public Vote
Jordan & Wesley	27–30	Olly Murs	—N/a	10	3	Public Vote
Okulaja	17	will.i.am	—N/a	10	5	Fourth Place
Hannah Williams	38	Sir Tom Jones	—N/a	10	5	Third Place
Grace Holden	18	Olly Murs	—N/a	10	6	Runner-up
Craig Eddie	22	Anne-Marie	—N/a	10	6	Winner
Cleo Clayton	23	will.i.am	—N/a	11	2	Callbacks Rounds
Rhianna Keane	22	will.i.am	—N/a	11	2	Callbacks Rounds
Eddy Pop	28	will.i.am	—N/a	11	2	Callbacks Rounds
Smokiecoco	21 & 24	will.i.am	—N/a	11	2	Callbacks Rounds
Hatice Tuzun	24	will.i.am	—N/a	11	2	Callbacks Rounds
Kira Mac	26	will.i.am	—N/a	11	2	Callbacks Rounds
Niamh Nolan	25	will.i.am	—N/a	11	2	Callbacks Rounds
Andres Cruz	24	Olly Murs	—N/a	11	2	Callbacks Rounds
Benjamin Moss	27	Olly Murs	—N/a	11	2	Callbacks Rounds
Tom Hartley-Booth	33	Olly Murs	—N/a	11	2	Callbacks Rounds
Abela Brother	26	Olly Murs	—N/a	11	2	Callbacks Rounds
Beatty Brothers	32 & 27	Olly Murs	—N/a	11	2	Callbacks Rounds
Olivia Mulqueeney	16	Olly Murs	—N/a	11	2	Callbacks Rounds
Rodwell Ndengeya	23	Olly Murs	—N/a	11	2	Callbacks Rounds
Ruby Joyce	18	Anne-Marie	—N/a	11	2	Callbacks Rounds
Harrison James	24	Anne-Marie	—N/a	11	2	Callbacks Rounds
Mila Lake	16	Anne-Marie	—N/a	11	2	Callbacks Rounds
Lucas Miles	19	Anne-Marie	—N/a	11	2	Callbacks Rounds
Hannah Rowe	19	Anne-Marie	—N/a	11	2	Callbacks Rounds
Olivia Mason	21	Anne-Marie	—N/a	11	2	Callbacks Rounds
Monroe	30-36	Anne-Marie	—N/a	11	2	Callbacks Rounds
Lee Jones	50	Sir Tom Jones	—N/a	11	2	Callbacks Rounds
Tobi Kaye	34	Sir Tom Jones	—N/a	11	2	Callbacks Rounds
Jamie Andrew	31	Sir Tom Jones	—N/a	11	2	Callbacks Rounds
Francesca Fairclough	27	Sir Tom Jones	—N/a	11	2	Callbacks Rounds
Thomas & Emilie	25 & 30	Sir Tom Jones	—N/a	11	2	Callbacks Rounds
Rhys Christian	30	Sir Tom Jones	—N/a	11	2	Callbacks Rounds
Clare Cordell	31	Sir Tom Jones	—N/a	11	2	Callbacks Rounds
Shaka	27	Olly Murs	—N/a	11	3	Semi-Finals
Marc Halls	35	Olly Murs	—N/a	11	3	Semi-Finals
Triniboi Joocie	32	Anne-Marie	—N/a	11	3	Semi-Finals
Kai Benjamin	18	Anne-Marie	—N/a	11	3	Semi-Finals
Rain Castillo	22	will.i.am	—N/a	11	3	Semi-Finals
Noèva	31	will.i.am	—N/a	11	3	Semi-Finals
Rachel Modest	45	Sir Tom Jones	—N/a	11	3	Semi-Finals
Jake Of Diamonds	28	Sir Tom Jones	—N/a	11	3	Semi-Finals
Mark Howard	27	Anne-Marie	—N/a	11	5	Fourth Place
Naomi Johnson	26	will.i.am	—N/a	11	5	Third Place
David Adeogun	20	Olly Murs	—N/a	11	6	Runner-up
Anthonia Edwards	25	Sir Tom Jones	—N/a	11	6	Winner
Cleo Stewart	30	will.i.am	—N/a	12	1	Withdrew
Jess Hayes	25	Olly Murs	—N/a	12	2	Callbacks Rounds
Simon Simms	28	Olly Murs	—N/a	12	2	Callbacks Rounds
The Ashatones	28–30	Olly Murs	—N/a	12	2	Callbacks Rounds
Marta Spizhenko	33	Olly Murs	—N/a	12	2	Callbacks Rounds
Sheridan Coldstream	59	Olly Murs	—N/a	12	2	Callbacks Rounds
Imisi Peletu	21	Olly Murs	—N/a	12	2	Callbacks Rounds
Jack Desmond	22	Olly Murs	—N/a	12	2	Callbacks Rounds
Sese Foster	31	will.i.am	—N/a	12	2	Callbacks Rounds
Shane Brierley	17	will.i.am	—N/a	12	2	Callbacks Rounds
Matt Green	34	will.i.am	—N/a	12	2	Callbacks Rounds
Hayley Chart	52	will.i.am	—N/a	12	2	Callbacks Rounds
Laville	36	will.i.am	—N/a	12	2	Callbacks Rounds
Zaza	30	will.i.am	—N/a	12	2	Callbacks Rounds
Gwannty	29	Anne-Marie	—N/a	12	2	Callbacks Rounds
Rachel Burnett	19	Anne-Marie	—N/a	12	2	Callbacks Rounds
Valntna	31	Anne-Marie	—N/a	12	2	Callbacks Rounds
The Skylarks	16 & 44	Anne-Marie	—N/a	12	2	Callbacks Rounds
Chinchilla	25	Anne-Marie	—N/a	12	2	Callbacks Rounds
Lil Shakz	18	Anne-Marie	—N/a	12	2	Callbacks Rounds
Ryan Barton	31	Anne-Marie	—N/a	12	2	Callbacks Rounds
Fatt Butcher	32	Sir Tom Jones	—N/a	12	2	Callbacks Rounds
Jazz Morley	33	Sir Tom Jones	—N/a	12	2	Callbacks Rounds
Brendan Shek	24	Sir Tom Jones	—N/a	12	2	Callbacks Rounds
Keilah Rebekah	23	Sir Tom Jones	—N/a	12	2	Callbacks Rounds
Adaeze	18	Sir Tom Jones	—N/a	12	2	Callbacks Rounds
Daisy Gill	24	Sir Tom Jones	—N/a	12	2	Callbacks Rounds
Jerusha Frimpong	27	Sir Tom Jones	—N/a	12	2	Callbacks Rounds
AV4C	32–39	Sir Tom Jones	—N/a	12	3	Semi-Finals
Bianca White	35	Sir Tom Jones	—N/a	12	3	Semi-Finals
Stan Urban	79	Olly Murs	—N/a	12	3	Semi-Finals
Kelly Hastings	41	Olly Murs	—N/a	12	3	Semi-Finals
THePETEBOX	39	will.i.am	—N/a	12	3	Semi-Finals
Katie Coleman	28	will.i.am	—N/a	12	3	Semi-Finals
Deja Vu	19–25	Anne-Marie	—N/a	12	3	Semi-Finals
Nia Ekanem	30	Anne Marie	—N/a	12	3	Semi-Finals
Jolie Stevens	19	Anne-Marie	—N/a	12	5	Runner-up
Hope Winter	23	Olly Murs	—N/a	12	5	Runner-up
Callum Doignie	28	Sir Tom Jones	—N/a	12	5	Runner-up
Jen & Liv	21 & 23	will.i.am	—N/a	12	5	Winner
Alya	18	will.i.am	—N/a	13	1	Withdrew
Zalika Henry	35	Sir Tom Jones	—N/a	13	2	Callbacks Rounds
Eda Nives	26	Sir Tom Jones	—N/a	13	2	Callbacks Rounds
Kuill Cameron	30	Sir Tom Jones	—N/a	13	2	Callbacks Rounds
Kealeigh Robertson	23	Sir Tom Jones	—N/a	13	2	Callbacks Rounds
Jack McGee	20	Sir Tom Jones	—N/a	13	2	Callbacks Rounds
Abdul Omoba	24	Sir Tom Jones	—N/a	13	2	Callbacks Rounds
Aaron Delano	25	Sir Tom Jones	—N/a	13	2	Callbacks Rounds
Matty Scott	20	will.i.am	—N/a	13	2	Callbacks Rounds
Twin MCS	39 & 39	will.i.am	—N/a	13	2	Callbacks Rounds
Kevon Bennett	32	will.i.am	—N/a	13	2	Callbacks Rounds
Olivier	23	will.i.am	—N/a	13	2	Callbacks Rounds
Amber Drameh	27	will.i.am	—N/a	13	2	Callbacks Rounds
Aaliyah Zhané	26	will.i.am	—N/a	13	2	Callbacks Rounds
Stan Buckroyd	21	Tom Fletcher & Danny Jones	—N/a	13	2	Callbacks Rounds
Roisin McCarney	28	Tom Fletcher & Danny Jones	—N/a	13	2	Callbacks Rounds
James Barlow	26	Tom Fletcher & Danny Jones	—N/a	13	2	Callbacks Rounds
The Twins	38 & 38	Tom Fletcher & Danny Jones	—N/a	13	2	Callbacks Rounds
Bette Reynolds	76	Tom Fletcher & Danny Jones	—N/a	13	2	Callbacks Rounds
Calum Jones	23	Tom Fletcher & Danny Jones	—N/a	13	2	Callbacks Rounds
Billy Lockett	32	Tom Fletcher & Danny Jones	—N/a	13	2	Callbacks Rounds
Nathan Grisdale	29	LeAnn Rimes	—N/a	13	2	Callbacks Rounds
Kailun Dennie	25	LeAnn Rimes	—N/a	13	2	Callbacks Rounds
ONOSE	26	LeAnn Rimes	—N/a	13	2	Callbacks Rounds
CHLOEJET	23	LeAnn Rimes	—N/a	13	2	Callbacks Rounds
Harry James	28	LeAnn Rimes	—N/a	13	2	Callbacks Rounds
Haydn Bardoe	21	LeAnn Rimes	—N/a	13	2	Callbacks Rounds
Joy Farrukh	56	LeAnn Rimes	—N/a	13	2	Callbacks Rounds
Conor McLoughlin	27	LeAnn Rimes	—N/a	13	3	Semi-Finals
Lois Morgan Gay	23	LeAnn Rimes	—N/a	13	3	Semi-Finals
ESNCE	20 & 20 (Note: ESNCE auditioned as a trio, however the third member 20-year-old Alice Page, also appeared on the second series of The Voice Kids, departed the group after the Callbacks.)	will.i.am	—N/a	13	3	Semi-Finals
MiC LOWRY	28–29	will.i.am	—N/a	13	3	Semi-Finals
Ace	20	Sir Tom Jones	—N/a	13	3	Semi-Finals
Hollie Peabody	21	Sir Tom Jones	—N/a	13	3	Semi-Finals
Kyra Smith	20	Tom Fletcher & Danny Jones	—N/a	13	3	Semi-Finals
Olivia Rogers	18	Tom Fletcher & Danny Jones	—N/a	13	3	Semi-Finals
Storry	36	will.i.am	—N/a	13	5	Runner-up
Deb Orah	28	LeAnn Rimes	—N/a	13	5	Runner-up
Billy & Louie	20 & 20	Tom Jones	—N/a	13	5	Runner-up
AVA	20	Tom Fletcher & Danny Jones	—N/a	13	5	Winner

== The Voice Kids ==
This is a list of contestants who have appeared on The Voice Kids, which ran between 2017 and 2023. Only contestants successfully picked by a coach are included here.

Contestant	Age	Coach	Series	Number of performances	Finish
Zena Donnelly	14	Pixie Lott	1	2	Battle Rounds
Miriam Nyarko	14	Pixie Lott	1	2	Battle Rounds
Jude Landeg	13	Danny Jones	1	2	Battle Rounds
Tilly McLaren	10	Danny Jones	1	2	Battle Rounds
Lil'T	10	will.i.am	1	2	Battle Rounds
Cole Lawton-Challenger	13	will.i.am	1	2	Battle Rounds
Eboni Green	14	Danny Jones	1	2	Battle Rounds
Hollie Firmin	13	Danny Jones	1	2	Battle Rounds
Dominyka Marcinkeviciute	13	will.i.am	1	2	Battle Rounds
Zara Francis	11	will.i.am	1	2	Battle Rounds
Tabi Gervis	14	Pixie Lott	1	2	Battle Rounds
Erin Connell	12	Pixie Lott	1	2	Battle Rounds
Leah D'Cruz	8	Pixie Lott	1	2	Battle Rounds
Devon Browne	12	Pixie Lott	1	2	Battle Rounds
Nathan Johnston	13	Danny Jones	1	2	Battle Rounds
Millianna Cotterell	14	Danny Jones	1	2	Battle Rounds
Marby Arriola	14	will.i.am	1	2	Battle Rounds
Victoria Wiltshire	14	will.i.am	1	2	Battle Rounds
Hayley Canham	14	Danny Jones	1	2	Battle Rounds
Juno Cox	14	Danny Jones	1	2	Battle Rounds
Francesca Luker	13	will.i.am	1	2	Battle Rounds
Adam Moloney	14	will.i.am	1	2	Battle Rounds
Chi Ennis McLean	12	Pixie Lott	1	2	Battle Rounds
Amaria Braithwaite	14	Pixie Lott	1	2	Battle Rounds
Jack Goodacre	11	Danny Jones	1	3	Semi-Finals
Jessica Richardson	13	Danny Jones	1	3	Semi-Finals
Brooke Layla	12	will.i.am	1	3	Semi-Finals
Perry Cooke	14	will.i.am	1	3	Semi-Finals
Sophia Burridge	12	Pixie Lott	1	3	Semi-Finals
Lewis Blissett	12	Pixie Lott	1	3	Semi-Finals
Courtney Hadwin	12	Danny Jones	1	4	Finalist
Riccardo Atherton	13	Pixie Lott	1	4	Finalist
Gina Philpot	13	will.i.am	1	4	Finalist
Erin LeCount	13	Danny Jones	1	4	Finalist
Jake McKechnie	12	will.i.am	1	4	Finalist
Jess Folley	14	Pixie Lott	1	4	Winner
Shaney-Lee Pool	7	Pixie Lott	2	2	Battle Rounds
Jimmy Rey	14	Pixie Lott	2	2	Battle Rounds
Jacob Norton	14	Danny Jones	2	2	Battle Rounds
J'Ci Ama	13	Danny Jones	2	2	Battle Rounds
Persia Siddiqui	14	will.i.am	2	2	Battle Rounds
Natasha Seth	13	will.i.am	2	2	Battle Rounds
Josh Lima	13	Danny Jones	2	2	Battle Rounds
Zoë Curry	14	Danny Jones	2	2	Battle Rounds
Astrid Smith	8	will.i.am	2	2	Battle Rounds
Savannah Munroe	7	will.i.am	2	2	Battle Rounds
Phoebe Maddison	14	Pixie Lott	2	2	Battle Rounds
Ella Thomas	13	Pixie Lott	2	2	Battle Rounds
Jude Ponting	13	will.i.am	2	2	Battle Rounds
Zoë Forward	13	will.i.am	2	2	Battle Rounds
Jennifer King	10	Danny Jones	2	2	Battle Rounds
Charlie Dillon	13	Danny Jones	2	2	Battle Rounds
Pardis Ajala	13	Pixie Lott	2	2	Battle Rounds
Ciaran Heggarty	13	Pixie Lott	2	2	Battle Rounds
Jessie Dale	12	Danny Jones	2	2	Battle Rounds
Lola Gorrod	14	Danny Jones	2	2	Battle Rounds
Krishna Shil	10	will.i.am	2	2	Battle Rounds
Kobi Ry	11	will.i.am	2	2	Battle Rounds
Lauren Mia Jones	14	Pixie Lott	2	2	Battle Rounds
Holly Aitken	14	Pixie Lott	2	2	Battle Rounds
Brooke Burke	9	Danny Jones	2	3	Semi-Finals
Lucy Thomas	13	Danny Jones	2	3	Semi-Finals
Mandy Scarlett	10	will.i.am	2	3	Semi-Finals
Kori Campbell	11	will.i.am	2	3	Semi-Finals
Will Callan	14	Pixie Lott	2	3	Semi-Finals
Alice Page	14	Pixie Lott	2	3	Semi-Finals
Lilia Slattery	10	Pixie Lott	2	4	Finalist
Harry Romer	14	Danny Jones	2	4	Finalist
Sienna-Leigh Campbell	14	will.i.am	2	4	Finalist
Drew Gudojc	14	Danny Jones	2	4	Finalist
Yaroslav Yakubchuk	11	will.i.am	2	4	Finalist
Daniel Davies	14	Pixie Lott	2	4	Winner
Rosa O'Reilly	11	will.i.am	3	2	Battle Rounds
The Mack Man	13	Pixie Lott	3	2	Battle Rounds
Aiysha Russell	13	Jessie J	3	2	Battle Rounds
Adi Nair	14	Jessie J	3	2	Battle Rounds
Caillin Joe	10	Pixie Lott	3	2	Battle Rounds
Colin Justin	10	Pixie Lott	3	2	Battle Rounds
Martha Moxon	13	Danny Jones	3	2	Battle Rounds
Wren Snaith	14	Danny Jones	3	2	Battle Rounds
Connie Emery	11	Jessie J	3	2	Battle Rounds
Jazzy Bolton	10	Jessie J	3	2	Battle Rounds
Aimee Bryceland	14	Pixie Lott	3	2	Battle Rounds
Lucy Simmonds	13	Pixie Lott	3	2	Battle Rounds
Peyton Chu	7	will.i.am	3	2	Battle Rounds
Alfie King & Ava MacFarlane	10 & 9	will.i.am	3	2	Battle Rounds
Mykee-D Worman	14	Danny Jones	3	2	Battle Rounds
Danny Corbo	13	Danny Jones	3	2	Battle Rounds
Sweet Harmony	13 & 12	Pixie Lott	3	2	Battle Rounds
Holly Taylor-Tuck & Emily Linge	10 & 11	Pixie Lott	3	2	Battle Rounds
Jamie Cushion	13	will.i.am	3	2	Battle Rounds
T'mya Fyffe	12	will.i.am	3	2	Battle Rounds
Charley Jones	13	Jessie J	3	2	Battle Rounds
Harry Hatcher	13	Jessie J	3	2	Battle Rounds
Ivy Pratt	12	Danny Jones	3	2	Battle Rounds
Ryan Lofthouse	14	Danny Jones	3	2	Battle Rounds
Raphael Higgins-Humes	13	will.i.am	3	3	Semi-Finals
David Adderley & Ammani Bengo	14 & 14	will.i.am	3	3	Semi-Finals
Amaree Ali	14	Jessie J	3	3	Semi-Finals
Pheobie Lola	13	Jessie J	3	3	Semi-Finals
Conor Marcus	13	Danny Jones	3	3	Semi-Finals
Joslyn Plant	11	Danny Jones	3	3	Semi-Finals
Liam Price	12	Pixie Lott	3	3	Semi-Finals
Chloe Dring	11	Pixie Lott	3	3	Semi-Finals
Gracie-Jayne Fitzgerald	12	Pixie Lott	3	5	Finalist
Lil Shan Shan	10	will.i.am	3	5	Finalist
Keira Laver	9	Jessie J	3	5	Finalist
Sam Wilkinson	13	Danny Jones	3	5	Winner
Jimmy Aska Winch	7	Danny Jones	4	2	Battle Rounds
Nessa & Cathal Markham	14 & 12	Danny Jones	4	2	Battle Rounds
James Hodgkinson	12	Paloma Faith	4	2	Battle Rounds
Sonny Killington	13	Paloma Faith	4	2	Battle Rounds
Thaila Charles	11	will.i.am	4	2	Battle Rounds
Ray-Tee Turner	12	will.i.am	4	2	Battle Rounds
Lydia Beech	13	Pixie Lott	4	2	Battle Rounds
Aadya Rajwanshi	10	Pixie Lott	4	2	Battle Rounds
Ruby Wellsted	13	Paloma Faith	4	2	Battle Rounds
Ruby Johnson	14	Paloma Faith	4	2	Battle Rounds
Daria Pando	14	Danny Jones	4	2	Battle Rounds
Jarren Garcia	13	Danny Jones	4	2	Battle Rounds
Asher Bhatti	13	Danny Jones	4	2	Battle Rounds
Connie Burgess	14	Danny Jones	4	2	Battle Rounds
Rachel O'Donnell	10	Paloma Faith	4	2	Battle Rounds
Heidi Katona	12	Paloma Faith	4	2	Battle Rounds
Lilly Hobbs	13	will.i.am	4	2	Battle Rounds
Fraya Ofoeme	13	will.i.am	4	2	Battle Rounds
Ned Payne	14	Pixie Lott	4	2	Battle Rounds
Maylah Renee	14	Pixie Lott	4	2	Battle Rounds
Ruby Maher	11	will.i.am	4	2	Battle Rounds
Misha Elin	12	will.i.am	4	2	Battle Rounds
Jemima Penny	10	Pixie Lott	4	2	Battle Rounds
Jae-Jai Saunders	12	Pixie Lott	4	2	Battle Rounds
Gracie O'Brien	14	Danny Jones	4	3	Semi-Finals
Blair Gilmour	13	Danny Jones	4	3	Semi-Finals
Isla Croll	14	Paloma Faith	4	3	Semi-Finals
Hayley Karinge	12	Paloma Faith	4	3	Semi-Finals
Savannah Sunique	13	will.i.am	4	3	Semi-Finals
Amos Thakid	13	will.i.am	4	3	Semi-Finals
Rae Harding	11	Pixie Lott	4	3	Semi-Finals
Joshua Regala	14	Pixie Lott	4	3	Semi-Finals
George Elliott	10	Danny Jones	4	5	Finalist
Dara McNicholl	12	Paloma Faith	4	5	Finalist
Victoria Alsina	7	will.i.am	4	5	Finalist
Justine Afante	13	Pixie Lott	4	5	Winner
Ndana Chinyoka	14	Melanie C	5	2	Battle Rounds
Mila Hayes	10	Melanie C	5	2	Battle Rounds
Fiona Vargas	13	Melanie C	5	2	Battle Rounds
Angel Lunda	12	will.i.am	5	2	Battle Rounds
Tino D'Souza	14	Melanie C	5	2	Battle Rounds
Sienna Hopkins	13	Melanie C	5	2	Battle Rounds
Joseph Sheppard	11	Danny Jones	5	2	Battle Rounds
Becky Peters	14	Danny Jones	5	2	Battle Rounds
Alby Welch	13	Danny Jones	5	2	Battle Rounds
Michaela Mutambira	11	Pixie Lott	5	2	Battle Rounds
Eva Ossei Gerning	11	Pixie Lott	5	2	Battle Rounds
Emily Flanagan	13	Pixie Lott	5	2	Battle Rounds
Leo Gandanzara	14	will.i.am	5	3	Finalist
Aishling Mae Bontoyan	14	Danny Jones	5	3	Finalist
Savannah Lily Boak	13	Pixie Lott	5	3	Finalist
Torrin Cuthill	14	Melanie C	5	3	Winner
Freya Catherine	13	Ronan Keating	6	2	Battle Rounds
Aimee McKelvie	12	Ronan Keating	6	2	Battle Rounds
Lyra Tucker	14	Ronan Keating	6	2	Battle Rounds
Caelan Edie	12	Danny Jones	6	2	Battle Rounds
Myleen Chivasa	14	Danny Jones	6	2	Battle Rounds
Bethany Sugatan	14	Danny Jones	6	2	Battle Rounds
Carter J Murphy	7	will.i.am	6	2	Battle Rounds
Darcie Mann	14	will.i.am	6	2	Battle Rounds
Amber Gregg	10	will.i.am	6	2	Battle Rounds
Tommy Featherstone	13	Pixie Lott	6	2	Battle Rounds
Lacey Leadbeatter	11	Pixie Lott	6	2	Battle Rounds
Eva Norton	12	Pixie Lott	6	2	Battle Rounds
Tawana McGrath	13	will.i.am	6	3	Finalist
Todd Dachtler	14	Danny Jones	6	3	Finalist
Sebastian Foreign	9	Ronan Keating	6	3	Finalist
Israella Chris	13	Pixie Lott	6	3	Winner
Abigail Moore	10	Danny Jones	7	2	Battle Rounds
Alexandra Perez Ramos	12	Danny Jones	7	2	Battle Rounds
Oscar Hartland	14	Danny Jones	7	2	Battle Rounds
Danny Bretherton	14	Ronan Keating	7	2	Battle Rounds
Jarlaith Mervyn	12	Ronan Keating	7	2	Battle Rounds
Yazmin Asim	11	Ronan Keating	7	2	Battle Rounds
Elim Enock	14	will.i.am	7	2	Battle Rounds
Tai'jah Dixon	13	will.i.am	7	2	Battle Rounds
Theo Hills	9	will.i.am	7	2	Battle Rounds
Elyssa Tait	13	Pixie Lott	7	2	Battle Rounds
Martha Kamugasa	14	Pixie Lott	7	2	Battle Rounds
Tiara-Leigh Ferns	13	Pixie Lott	7	2	Battle Rounds
Niamh Noade	14	Ronan Keating	7	3	Finalist
Will Edgar	14	Danny Jones	7	3	Finalist
Hayla-Essen Danns	12	Pixie Lott	7	3	Finalist
Shanice & Andrea Nyandoro	11 & 11	will.i.am	7	3	Winner
