= The Voice Kids (British TV series) series 7 =

The Voice Kids
- Series 7
- Hosted by: Emma Willis
- Coaches: will.i.am; Ronan Keating; Pixie Lott; Danny Jones
- Winners: Shanice & Andrea Nyandoro
- Winning coach: will.i.am
- No. of episodes: 3

Release
- Original network: ITV1
- Original release: 1 July – 15 July 2023

Series chronology
- ← Previous; Series 6

The Voice Kids is a British television music competition to find new singing talent. The seventh series began airing on 1 July 2023 on ITV1. The series was confirmed by ITV in September 2022 when applications opened. They closed in November, prior to the airing of the previous series. The programme aired in the summer slot for the first time since the fourth series and aired weekly again, instead of nightly. will.i.am, Ronan Keating, Pixie Lott and Danny Jones all returned as coaches, making it the first time since the third series that all coaches from the previous series returned.

The series was won by twins Shanice & Andrea Nyandoro, making them the first duo to win the show. Their victory also marks will.i.am's first win as a coach on the kids version of the show. This also means that will.i.am has won at least one season in each version he's competed on, as he has won in both the adult series and The Voice Australia.

This series is currently the latest to air. Following the final, it was announced that the show would be put on a hiatus, leaving the fate of the series unknown.

== Teams ==
Colour key:

- Winner
- Finalist
- Eliminated in the Battles

Coach	Top 16 Artists			
will.i.am	Shanice & Andrea Nyandoro	Elim Enock	Tai'jah Dixon	Theo Hills
Ronan Keating	Niamh Noade	Danny Bretherton	Jarlaith Mervyn	Yazmin Asim
Pixie Lott	Hayla-Essen Danns	Elyssa Tait	Martha Kamugasa	Tiara-Leigh Ferns
Danny Jones	Will Edgar	Abigail Moore	Alexandra Perez Ramos	Oscar Hartland

== Blind auditions ==
Color key

✔	Coach hit his/her "I WANT YOU" button
	Artist defaulted to this coach's team
	Artist elected to join this coach's team
	Artist eliminated with no coach pressing his or her "I WANT YOU" button
	Artist received an 'All Turn'.

=== Episode 1 (1 July) ===
Order	Artist	Age	Song	Coach's and contestant's choices			
Order	Artist	Age	Song	will.i.am	Ronan	Pixie	Danny
1	Oscar Hartland	16	"My Hero"	–	✔	✔	✔
2	Niamh Noade	14	"The Winner Takes It All"	–	✔	✔	✔
3	Stanislav Kurdybakha	11	"Ave verum corpus"	–	–	–	–
4	Tiara-Leigh Ferns	13	"Over the Rainbow"	–	–	✔	–
5	Theo Hills	9	"When I Grow Up"	✔	–	–	–
6	Hayla-Essen Danns	12	"Golden Hour"	–	–	✔	✔
7	Zara Bateson	10	"Ghost of You"	–	–	–	–
8	Danny Bretherton	14	"Naïve"	–	✔	–	–
9	Alexandra Perez Ramos	12	"Be My Baby"	–	–	–	✔
10	Tai'jah Dixon	13	"Thank God" (original song)	✔	–	✔	✔

=== Episode 2 (8 July) ===
Order	Artist	Age	Song	Coach's and contestant's choices			
Order	Artist	Age	Song	will.i.am	Ronan	Pixie	Danny
1	Shanice & Andrea Nyandoro	11	"Faith"	✔	✔	–	✔
2	Abigail Moore	10	"(Everything I Do) I Do It for You"	–	✔	✔	✔
3	Armari Freestone	12	"TBA (original song)"	–	–	–	–
4	Martha Kamugasa	14	"Lift Me Up"	–	–	✔	–
5	Jarlaith Mervyn	12	"I Don't Want to Talk About It"	–	✔	–	–
6	Elim Enock	14	"Godspeed"	✔	✔	✔	✔
7	Yazmin Asim	11	"Fingers Crossed"	Team full	✔	–	–
8	Ziame Stewart	12	"Part of Your World"	Team full	Team full	–	–
9	Elyssa Tait	13	"Everything I Didn't Say"	Team full	Team full	✔	✔
10	Maisie Farr	12	"Reach"	Team full	Team full	Team full	–
11	Will Edgar	14	"Nice to Meet Ya"	Team full	Team full	Team full	✔

== Show details ==
=== Results summary ===
Team's colour key
Team will.i.am
Team Ronan
Team Pixie
Team Danny

Result's colour key
Artist received the most public votes
Runner-up
Third Finalist
Artist received the least public votes
Artist was eliminated

Results per artist
Contestant	Battles round	Grand Final
Shanice & Andrea Nyandoro	Safe	Winner
Hayla-Essen Danns	Safe	Runner-up
Niamh Noade	Safe	Third Place
Will Edgar	Safe	Fourth Place
Elyssa Tait	Eliminated	Eliminated (Battles round)
Martha Kamugasa	Eliminated	Eliminated (Battles round)
Tiara-Leigh Ferns	Eliminated	Eliminated (Battles round)
Elim Enock	Eliminated	Eliminated (Battles round)
Tai'jah Dixon	Eliminated	Eliminated (Battles round)
Theo Hills	Eliminated	Eliminated (Battles round)
Danny Bretherton	Eliminated	Eliminated (Battles round)
Jarlaith Mervyn	Eliminated	Eliminated (Battles round)
Yazmin Asim	Eliminated	Eliminated (Battles round)
Abigail Moore	Eliminated	Eliminated (Battles round)
Alexandra Perez Ramos	Eliminated	Eliminated (Battles round)
Oscar Hartland	Eliminated	Eliminated (Battles round)

=== Final (15 July) ===
Musical guest: Cat Burns ("Live More & Love More")

==== Battles round ====
Battles colour key
Artist won the Battle and advanced to the Grand Final
Artist lost the Battle and was eliminated

Battles results
Order	Coach	Artists				Song
1	Danny Jones	Will Edgar	Abigail Moore	Alexandra Perez Ramos	Oscar Hartland	"Flowers"
2	Ronan Keating	Niamh Noade	Danny Bretherton	Jarlaith Mervyn	Yazmin Asim	"Don't Look Back in Anger"
3	will.i.am	Shanice & Andrea Nyandoro	Elim Enock	Tai'jah Dixon	Theo Hills	"Special"
4	Pixie Lott	Hayla-Essen Danns	Elyssa Tait	Martha Kamugasa	Tiara-Leigh Ferns	"Climb Ev'ry Mountain"

==== Grand Final ====
Final results
Order	Coach	Artist	Song	Result
1	Ronan Keating	Niamh Noade	"People Help the People"	Third Place
2	Danny Jones	Will Edgar	"The Best"	Fourth Place
3	Pixie Lott	Hayla-Essen Danns	"I Am Changing"	Runner-up
4	will.i.am	Shanice & Andrea Nyandoro	"A Sky Full of Stars"	Winner
