= The Voice Kids (British TV series) =

Singing talent show

- Genre: Talent show
- Created by: John de Mol Jr.
- Presented by: Emma Willis
- Judges: will.i.am; Pixie Lott; Danny Jones; Jessie J; Paloma Faith; Melanie C; Ronan Keating
- Country of origin: United Kingdom
- Original language: English
- No. of series: 7
- No. of episodes: 41

Production
- Production locations: Dock10 (2017–2021); Elstree Studios (2022–2023)
- Running time: 90–120 minutes (inc. adverts)
- Production companies: ITV Studios Entertainment (2017–2020); Talpa (2017–2019); Lifted Entertainment (2021–2023)

Original release
- Network: ITV1
- Release: 10 June 2017 – 15 July 2023

Related
- The Voice UK; The Voice (franchise)

The Voice Kids is a British singing competition television series. Created by John de Mol Jr., it premiered on ITV during the summer television cycle on 10 June 2017. Based on the original The Voice of Holland, and part of The Voice franchise, it aired seven series and aimed to feature young aspiring singers aged 7 to 14. The winners received a monetary prize and a family holiday.

The winners of the seven series were: Jess Folley, Daniel Davies, Sam Wilkinson, Justine Afante, Torrin Cuthill, Israella Chris and Shanice & Andrea Nyandoro.

The series employed a panel of coaches who critiqued the artists' performances and guided their teams of selected artists through the remainder of the series. They also competed to ensure that their act won the competition, thus making them the winning coach. The original panel's coaches, will.i.am, Danny Jones, and Pixie Lott, each guided a champion at least once. Pixie was the victorious mentor four times, while Melanie C also had a member of her team triumph at the show. Three other panel coaches were Jessie J, Paloma Faith, and Ronan Keating.

The show was shortened from eight to three episodes since 2021. On 29 July 2023, it was announced that the show would be on hiatus to make room for another spin-off, putting the children's format in jeopardy.

== History ==
In early 2016, along with the announcement that The Voice UK would move to ITV under a three-year deal, it was announced that the network had ordered The Voice Kids, a junior spinoff featuring younger aspiring singers, for two series. After attaining high ratings, it was announced that the network had renewed The Voice Kids for three series. In 2021, the battles & the semi-final were axed.

In August 2022 it was announced that The Voice UK and The Voice Kids would return in 2023 on ITV. The seventh series aired in summer 2023, following the same format as the previous seasons.

=== Selection process ===
The open auditions application for the first series closed on 2 September 2016, with the age limit being 7–14 years old. The show began staging producers' audition days in August 2016 across the United Kingdom, with the blind auditions beginning filming in December 2016. For season 5, filming began in February 2021.

== Format ==
There were four phases to the competition:

- Stage 1: Blind auditions
- Stage 2: Battles
- Stage 3: Semi-final (axed from season 5-7)
- Stage 4: Live final (pre-recorded since season 4-7)

In the first series, the winner received £30,000 and a family trip to Disneyland Paris. Unlike the adult version, there were no knockouts rounds. When it was previously reported that the adult version's sixth series would feature five live shows (which turned out to be the usual three), reports claimed that there would be three live shows; however, there was only one, the live final. In 2021, the battles were axed. The semi-final was pre-recorded at LH2 Studios on 19 February 2017.

In the third series, the winner received £30,000 and the four finalists received a trip to Walt Disney World, Florida on Norwegian Airlines. In the fourth series, the winner received the same £30K prize, and a family trip to Universal Orlando Resort, Florida, also via Norwegian Airlines. For the sixth series, the winner gets the prize money and a family trip to Universal Orlando via TUI Airways.

== Series overview ==
Warning: the following table presents a significant number of different colors.

The Voice Kids series overview
Series	Aired	Winner	Other finalists			Winning coach	Presenter	Coaches (chair order)			
Series	Aired	Winner	Other finalists			Winning coach	Presenter	1	2	3	4
1	2017	Jess Folley	Note: Five artists finished second in series one. (Note: Team Danny: Courtney Hadwin, Erin LeCount; Team Will: Gina Philpot, Jake McKechnie; Team Pixie: Riccardo Atherton.)			Pixie Lott	Emma Willis	will.i.am	Pixie	Danny	—
2	2018	Daniel Davies	Note: Five artists finished second in series two. (Note: Team Danny: Drew Gudojc, Harry Romer; Team Will: Sienna-Leigh Campbell, Yaroslav Yakubchuk; Team Pixie: Lilia Slattery.)			Pixie Lott	Emma Willis	will.i.am	Pixie	Danny	—
3	2019	Sam Wilkinson	Gracie-Jayne Fitzgerald	Keira Laver	Lil Shan Shan	Danny Jones	Emma Willis	will.i.am	Jessie J	Pixie	Danny
4	2020	Justine Afante	George Elliott	Dara McNicholl	Victoria Alsina	Pixie Lott	Emma Willis	will.i.am	Paloma	Pixie	Danny
5	2021	Torrin Cuthill	Leo Gandanzara	Savannah Lily Boak	Aishling Mae Bontoyan	Melanie C	Emma Willis	will.i.am	Melanie C	Pixie	Danny
6	2022	Israella Chris	Tawana McGrath	Sebastian Foreign	Todd Dachtler	Pixie Lott	Emma Willis	will.i.am	Ronan	Pixie	Danny
7	2023	Shanice & Andrea Nyandoro	Hayla-Essen Danns	Niamh Noade	Will Edgar	will.i.am	Emma Willis	will.i.am	Ronan	Pixie	Danny

== Coaches and hosts ==
On 15 November 2016, it was announced Pixie Lott and Danny Jones from McFly would be coaches along with will.i.am. Of this announcement, Pixie Lott commented, "I can't wait to join The Voice Kids and help discover the next big star. I have such a passion for talented young people, and I know the UK will have lots – I can't wait to hear them! I'm looking forward to getting started and working along the sides of my fellow coaches will.i.am and Danny Jones." Jones stated, "I'm pumped about joining The Voice Kids team. There are so many talented kids out there, they just need to be heard, and this is a great platform for them. I'm looking forward to finding some fresh talent and coaching them. You never know, there might be a mini McFly out there!" and will.i.am said, "Doing the Voice Kids with Pixie and Danny is going to be dope and I'm really excited to discover just how talented British kids can be."

In December 2018, it was announced that Jessie J would join will.i.am, Jones, and Lott for the third series. Jessie J opted that she would not return to the show's 4th series. In November 2019, it was announced that Paloma Faith would replace Jessie J for the show's fourth season, alongside will.i.am, Lott and Jones. In August 2020, ITV confirmed that series 5 would air in 2021. On 7 February 2021 it was announced that Melanie C would replace Paloma Faith in series 5. In January 2022, it was announced that Ronan Keating would replace Melanie C in series 6. All coaches from series 6 returned for the seventh series in 2023 before the show went on hiatus.

=== Timeline of coaches ===
Coaches	Seasons						
Coaches	1	2	3	4	5	6	7
will.i.am							
Pixie Lott							
Danny Jones							
Jessie J							
Paloma Faith							
Melanie C							
Ronan Keating							

=== Coaches ===
Coaches gallery

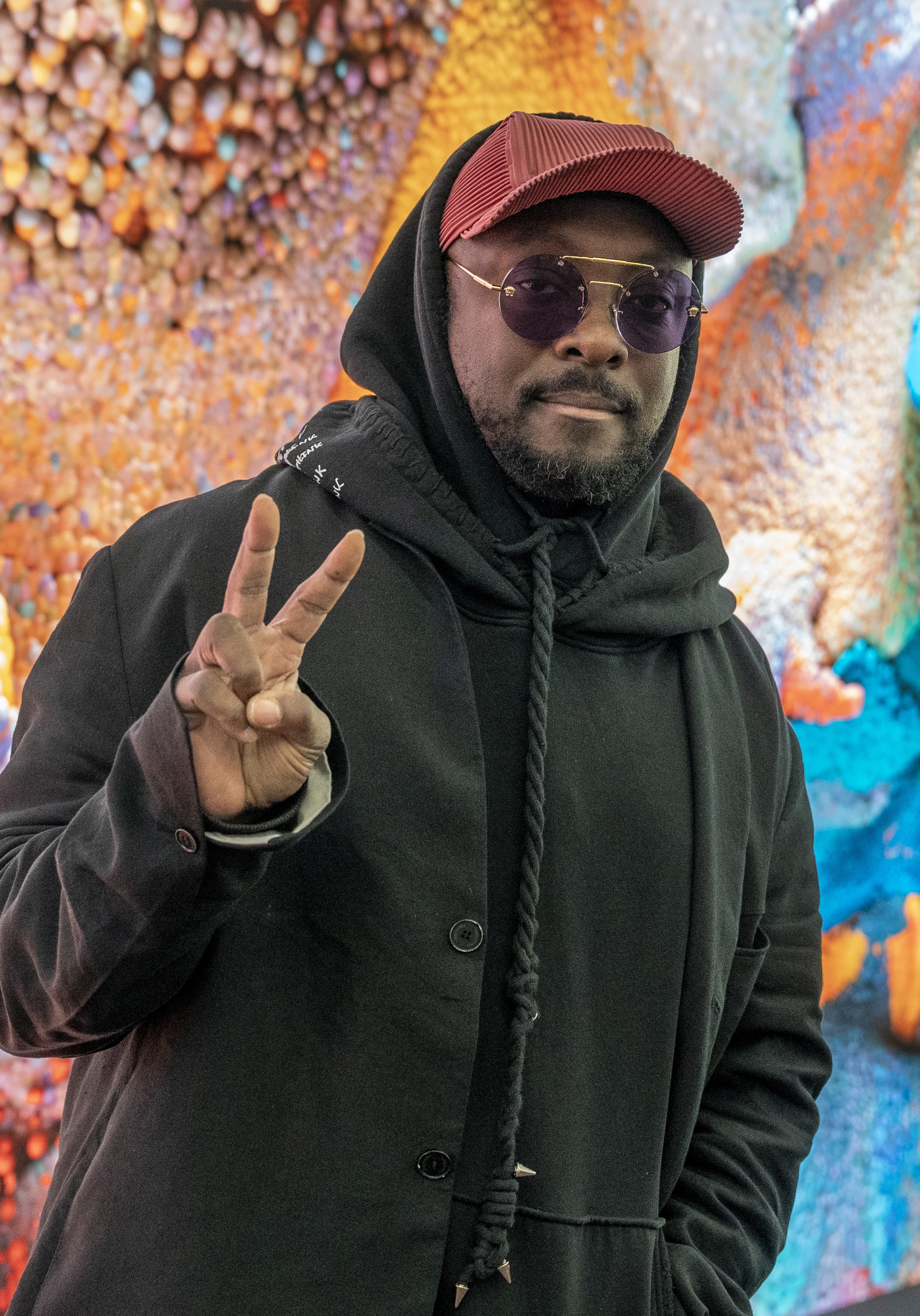
will.i.am
(2017–2023)

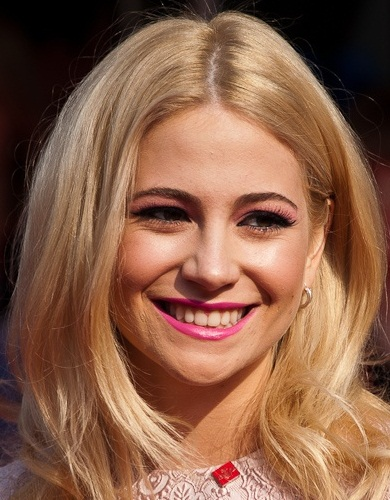
Pixie Lott
(2017–2023)

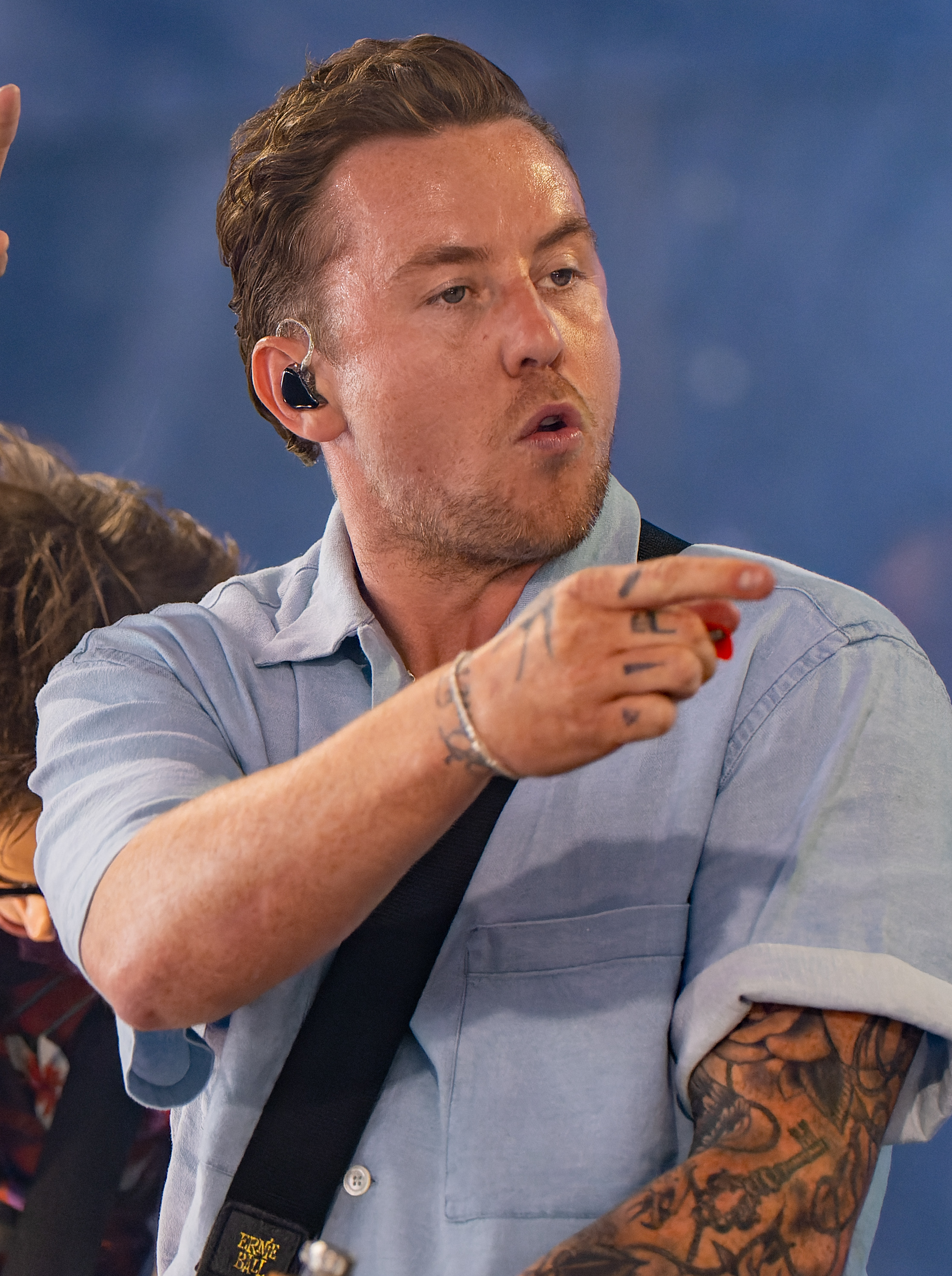
Danny Jones
(2017–2023)

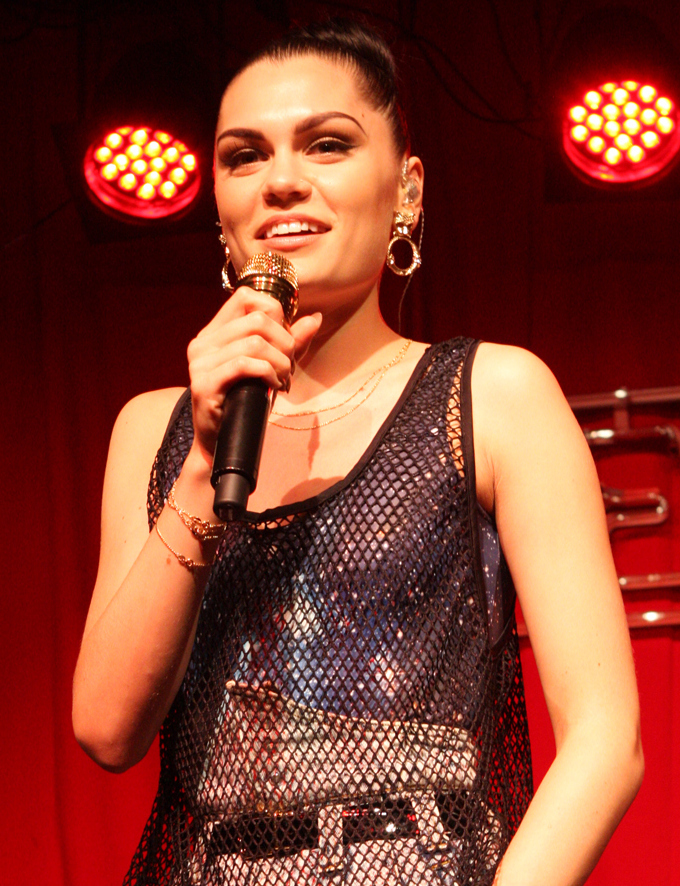
Jessie J
(2019)

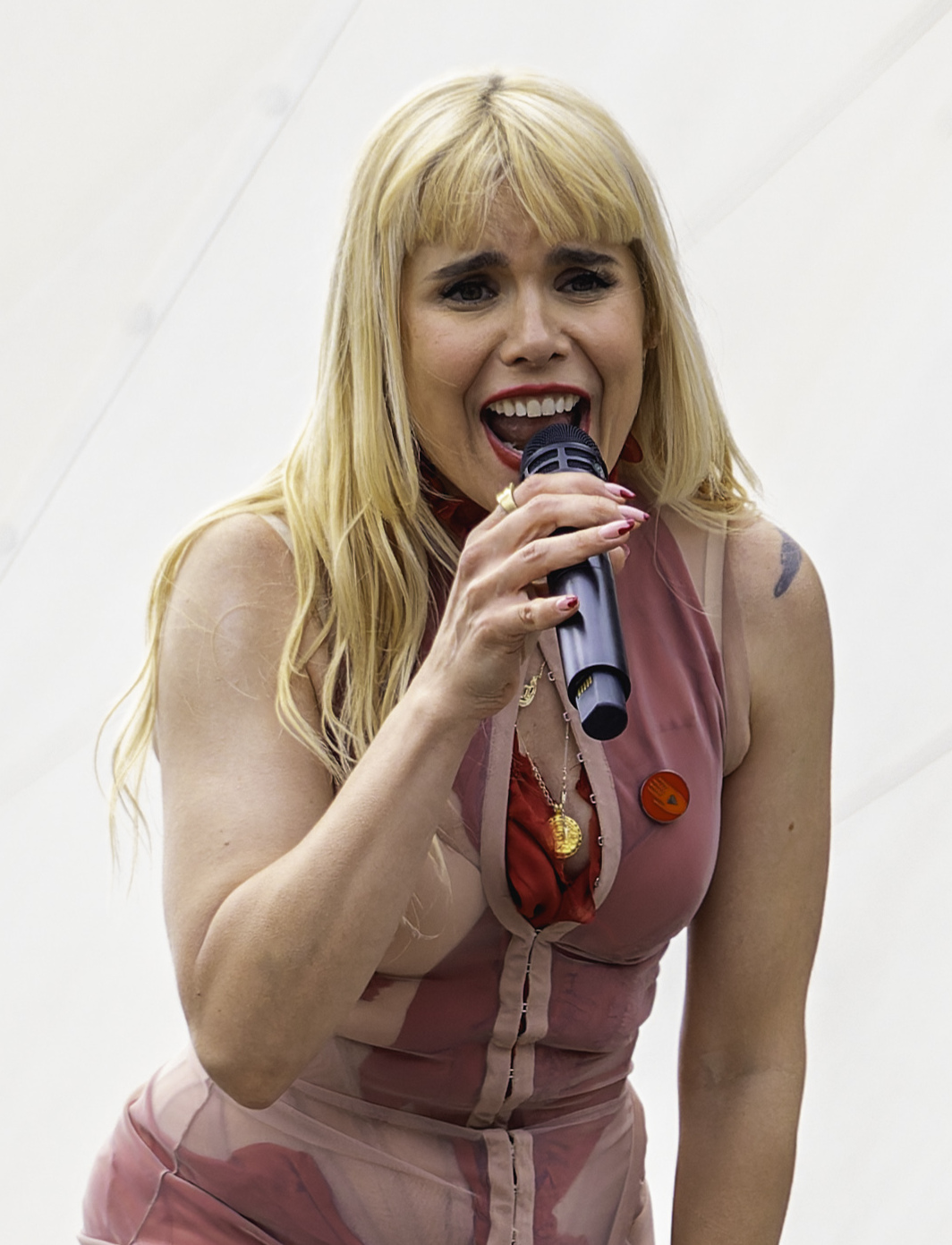
Paloma Faith
(2020)

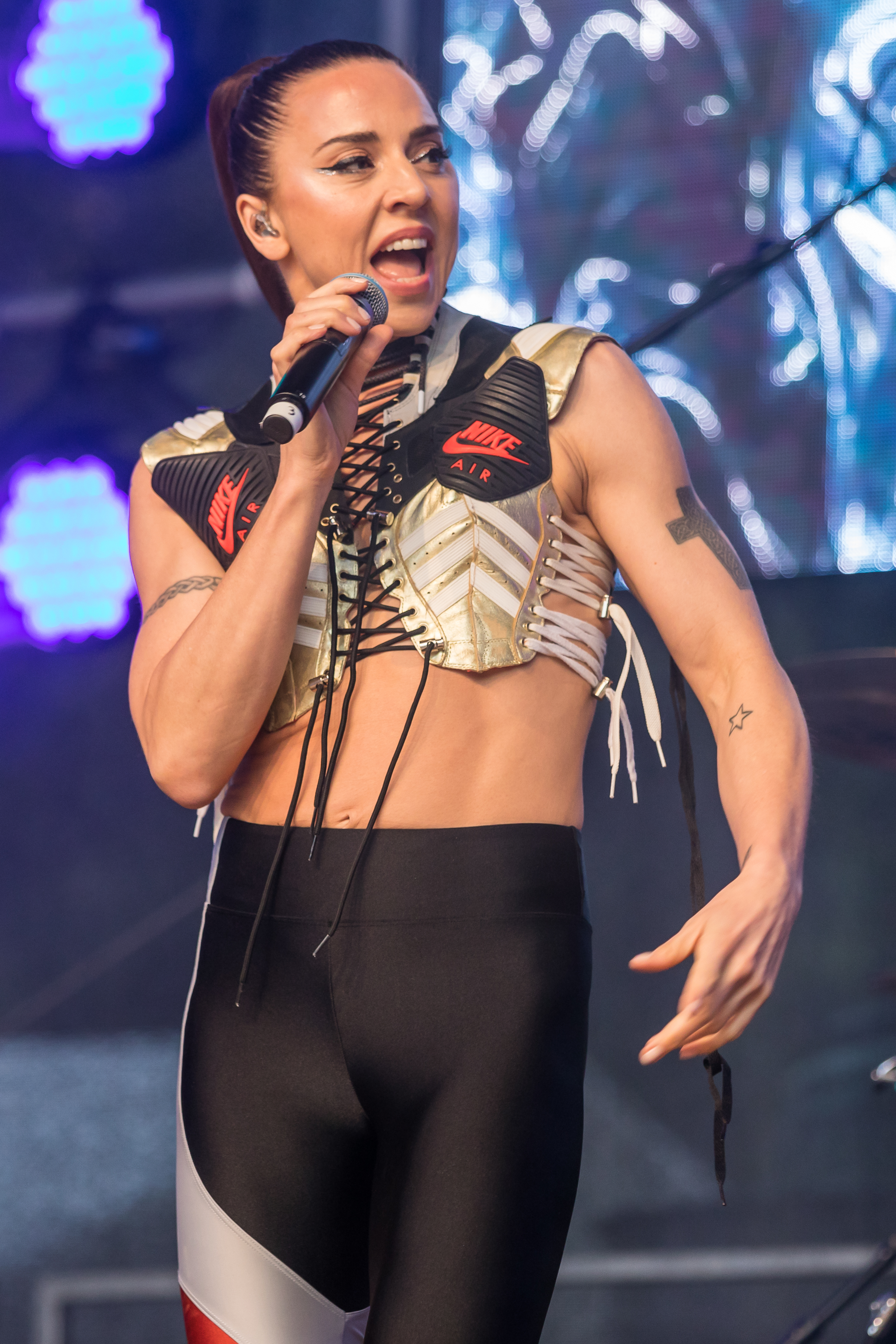
Melanie C
(2021)

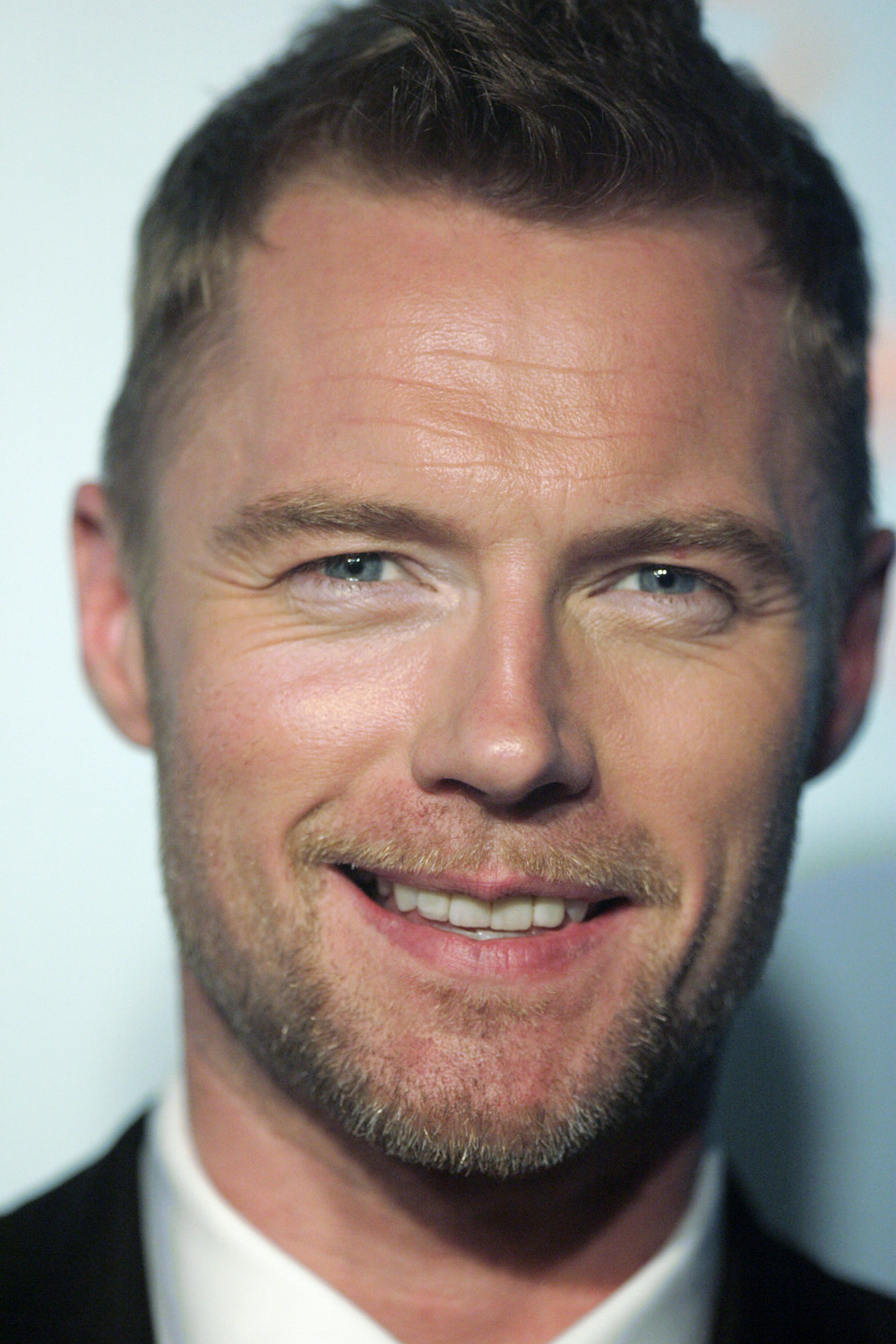
Ronan Keating
(2022–2023)

=== Coaches' teams ===
- Winner
- Runner-up
- Third Place
- Fourth Place
  - Winners are in bold, the finalists in the finale are in italicized font, and the eliminated artists are in small font.

The Voice Kids UK coaches and their teams
Season	will.i.am	Pixie Lott	Danny Jones	—N/a
1	Jake McKechnie; Gina Philpot; Brooke Layla; Perry Cooke	**Jess Folley**; Riccardo Atherton; Lewis Blissett; Sophia Burridge	Courtney Hadwin; Erin LeCount; Jessica Richardson; Jack Goodacre	—N/a
2	Sienna-Leigh Campbell; Yaroslav Yakubchuk; Kori Campbell; Mandy Scarlett	**Daniel Davies**; Lilia Slattery; Alice Page; Will Callan	Drew Gudojc; Harry Romer; Brooke Burke; Lucy Thomas	—N/a
3	will.i.am	Jessie J	Pixie Lott	Danny Jones
3	Lil Shan Shan; David Adderley & Ammani Bengo; Raphael Higgins-Humes	Keira Laver; Amaree Ali; Pheobie Lola	Gracie-Jayne Fitzgerald; Chloe Dring; Liam Price	**Sam Wilkinson**; Conor Marcus; Joslyn Plant
4	will.i.am	Paloma Faith	Pixie Lott	Danny Jones
4	Victoria Alsina; Amos Thakid; Savannah Sunique	Dara McNicholl; Hayley Karinge; Isla Croll	**Justine Afante**; Joshua Regala; Rae Harding	George Elliott; Blair Gilmour; Gracie O'Brien
5	will.i.am	Melanie C	Pixie Lott	Danny Jones
5	Leo Gandanzara; Angel Lunda; Tino D'Souza; Sienna Hopkins	**Torrin Cuthill**; Ndana Chinyoka; Mila Hayes; Fiona Vargas	Savannah Lily Boak; Michaela Mutambira; Eva Ossei Gerning; Emily Flanagan	Aishling Mae Bontoyan; Joseph Sheppard; Becky Peters; Alby Welch
6	will.i.am	Ronan Keating	Pixie Lott	Danny Jones
6	Tawana McGrath; Amber Gregg; Darcie Mann; Carter J Murphy	Sebastian Foreign; Freya Catherine; Lyra Tucker; Aimee McKelvie	**Israella Chris**; Eva Norton; Lacey Leadbetter; Tommy Featherstone	Todd Dachtler; Bethany; Myleen Chivasa; Caelan Edie
7	**Shanice & Andrea Nyandoro**; Theo Hills; Tai'jah Dixon; Elim Enock	Niamh Noade; Danny Bretherton; Jarlaith Mervyn; Yazmin Asim	Hayla-Essen Danns; Tiara-Leigh Ferns; Martha Kamugasa; Elyssa Tait	Will Edgar; Oscar Hartland; Alexandra Perez Ramos; Abigail Moore

=== Presenters ===
After the announcement that she would be staying with the adult show, Emma Willis announced in July 2016 that she would be presenting The Voice Kids, which boosted the show's popularity. Of this announcement, Willis commented, "Hosting The Voice Kids will be like being at my house on a Saturday night; lots of kids singing, with me trying to keep some kind of order. Thankfully, the musical genius that is will.i.am is there to bring some expertise to the table. It's going to be pretty awesome."

Presenters Gallery

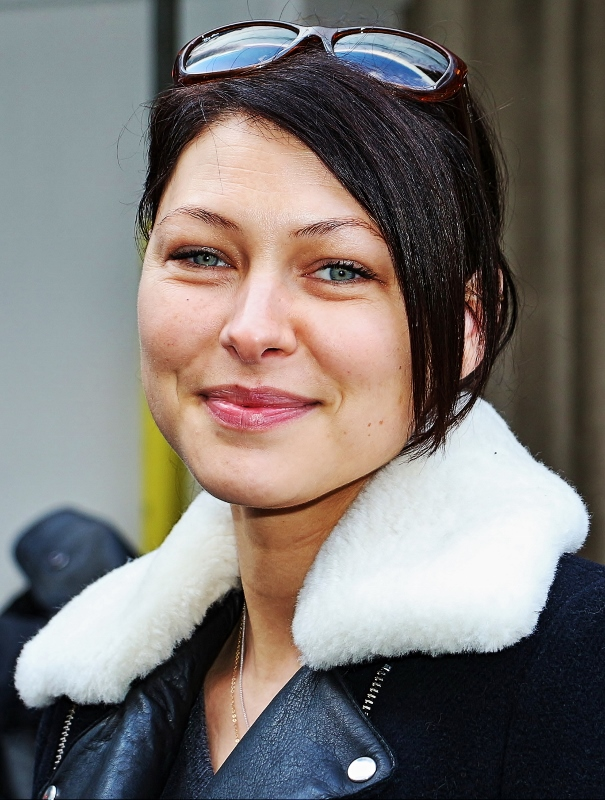
Emma Willis

==== Timeline of presenters ====
Presenters	Seasons						
Presenters	1	2	3	4	5	6	7
Emma Willis							
Cel Spellman							
Vick Hope							
AJ Odudu							

Key
Main presenter
Backstage presenter

== Ratings ==
The Voice Kids : UK viewers per episode (millions)

Series	Episode number								Average
Series	1	2	3	4	5	6	7	8	Average
1	4.71	3.44	4.17	4.19	3.29	2.98	3.75	3.51	3.76
2	3.33	3.02	3.58	3.08	3.57	3.01	3.43	3.48	3.31
3	3.78	3.33	3.55	3.43	3.47	3.64	3.59	4.01	3.60
4	3.74	3.60	4.09	3.41	3.33	3.54	3.68	4.28	3.71
5	3.66	3.89	4.09	–					3.89
6	3.78	3.86	4.08	–					3.91
7	2.96	2.49	2.77	–					2.74

Audience measurement performed by Broadcasters' Audience Research Board
