= The Voice Kids (British TV series) series 6 =

The Voice Kids
- Series 6
- Hosted by: Emma Willis
- Coaches: will.i.am; Pixie Lott; Danny Jones; Ronan Keating
- Winner: Israella Chris
- Winning coach: Pixie Lott

Release
- Original network: ITV
- Original release: 26 December – 28 December 2022

Series chronology
- ← Previous; Series 5 Next → Series 7

The Voice Kids is a British television music competition to find new singing talent. The sixth series began airing on 26 December 2022, on ITV. Emma Willis returned to present the series. Danny Jones, Pixie Lott and will.i.am returned as coaches, whilst, on 21 January 2022, it was announced that former The Voice Australia coach Ronan Keating would replace Melanie C this series. Similar to the previous series, it was announced that the series would contain three episodes – two blind auditions and the final – which aired over three consecutive nights, with the show concluding on 28 December.

Israella Chris won the competition, marking Pixie Lott's fourth win as a coach and the most wins in any version of the UK variation of the show after Sir Tom Jones gained his third victory in the eleventh regular series.

== Teams ==
Colour key:

- Winner
- Finalist
- Eliminated in the Battles

Coach	Top 16 Artists			
will.i.am	Tawana McGrath	Carter J Murphy	Amber Gregg	Darcie Mann
Ronan Keating	Sebastian Foreign	Freya Nicoll	Aimee McKelvie	Lyra Tucker
Pixie Lott	Israella Chris	Tommy Featherstone	Lacey Leadbetter	Eva Norton
Danny Jones	Todd Dachtler	Bethany	Myleen Chivasa	Caelan Edie

== Blind auditions ==
Blind auditions colour key
✔	Coach pressed "I WANT YOU" button
	Artist defaulted to this coach's team
	Artist elected to join this coach's team
	Artist eliminated as no coach pressed his or her "I WANT YOU" button
	Artist received an 'All Turn'.

=== Episode 1 (26 December) ===
The first episode aired on 26 December 2022 and featured the first round of auditions.

Episode one results
Order	Artist	Age	Song	Coach's and contestant's choices			
Order	Artist	Age	Song	will.i.am	Ronan	Pixie	Danny
1	Freya Nicoll	13	"Piece of My Heart"	✔	✔	✔	✔
2	Carter J Murphy	7	"Dear Darlin'"	✔	–	–	–
3	Olga	11	"Crazy in Love"	–	–	–	–
4	Lacey Leadbetter	11	"Bridge over Troubled Water"	–	✔	✔	✔
5	Myleen Chivasa	14	"Almost Is Never Enough"	–	✔	–	✔
6	Sebastian Foreign	9	"L-O-V-E"	–	✔	–	–
7	Bethany	14	"Drivers License"	–	–	–	✔
8	Tommy Featherstone	13	"Make You Feel My Love"	–	–	✔	✔
9	Tawana McGrath	13	"Ain't No Sunshine"	✔	✔	✔	✔

=== Episode 2 (27 December) ===
The second episode aired on 27 December 2022 and featured the second round of auditions.

Episode two results
Order	Artist	Age	Song	Coach's and contestant's choices			
Order	Artist	Age	Song	will.i.am	Ronan	Pixie	Danny
1	Israella Chris	13	"Georgia on My Mind"	–	✔	✔	✔
2	Todd Dachtler	14	"Always Be My Baby"	–	✔	–	✔
3	Gabriella & Jasmine Tuicicia	12 & 10	"Master Blaster (Jammin')"	–	–	–	–
4	Amber Gregg	10	"Remember"	✔	–	–	–
5	Caelan Edie	12	"i"	–	–	–	✔
6	Aimee McKelvie	12	"Wild World"	–	✔	–	Team full
7	Eva Norton	12	"Jealous"	–	–	✔	Team full
8	Darcie Mann	14	"Bruises"	✔	–	Team full	Team full
9	Sam	14	"Bring Him Home"	Team full	–	Team full	Team full
10	Lyra Tucker	14	"River"	Team full	✔	Team full	Team full

== Show details ==
=== Results summary ===
Team's colour key
Team Will
Team Ronan
Team Pixie
Team Danny

Result's colour key
Artist received the most public votes
Runner-up
Third Finalist
Artist received the least public votes
Artist was eliminated

Results per artist
Contestant	Battles round	Grand Final
Israella Chris	Safe	Winner
Tawana McGrath	Safe	Runner-up
Sebastian Foreign	Safe	Third Place
Todd Dachtler	Safe	Fourth Place
Eva Norton	Eliminated	Eliminated (Battles round)
Lacey Leadbetter	Eliminated	Eliminated (Battles round)
Tommy Featherstone	Eliminated	Eliminated (Battles round)
Amber Gregg	Eliminated	Eliminated (Battles round)
Carter J Murphy	Eliminated	Eliminated (Battles round)
Darcie Mann	Eliminated	Eliminated (Battles round)
Bethany	Eliminated	Eliminated (Battles round)
Caelan Edie	Eliminated	Eliminated (Battles round)
Myleen Chivasa	Eliminated	Eliminated (Battles round)
Aimee McKelvie	Eliminated	Eliminated (Battles round)
Freya Nicoll	Eliminated	Eliminated (Battles round)
Lyra Tucker	Eliminated	Eliminated (Battles round)

=== Final (28 December) ===
The final episode aired on 28 December 2022.

==== Battles round ====
Battles colour key
Artist won the Battle and advanced to the Grand Final
Artist lost the Battle and was eliminated

Battles results
Order	Coach	Artists				Song
1	Ronan Keating	Sebastian Foreign	Freya Nicoll	Aimee McKelvie	Lyra Tucker	"Without You"
2	Danny Jones	Todd Dachtler	Caelan Edie	Myleen Chivasa	Bethany	"Say Something"
3	will.i.am	Tawana McGrath	Carter J Murphy	Darcie Mann	Amber Gregg	"Levitating"
4	Pixie Lott	Israella Chris	Tommy Featherstone	Lacey Leadbetter	Eva Norton	"Time After Time"

==== Grand Final ====
Final results
Order	Coach	Artist	Song	Result
1	Danny Jones	Todd Dachtler	"In My Blood"	Fourth Place
2	Ronan Keating	Sebastian Foreign	"Rainbow Connection"	Third Place
3	will.i.am	Tawana McGrath	"And I Am Telling You I'm Not Going"	Runner-up
4	Pixie Lott	Israella Chris	"How Great Thou Art"	Winner
