= The Voice Kids (British TV series) series 2 =

Second series of The Voice Kids

The Voice Kids
- Series 2
- Hosted by: Emma Willis (ITV); Vick Hope (ITV Hub)
- Coaches: will.i.am; Pixie Lott; Danny Jones
- Winner: Daniel Davies
- Winning coach: Pixie Lott
- No. of episodes: 8

Release
- Original network: ITV; ITV Hub (The V Room)
- Original release: 14 July – 21 July 2018

Series chronology
- ← Previous; Series 1 Next → Series 3

The Voice Kids is a British television music competition to find new singing talent. The second series began airing on 14 July 2018, being broadcast on a daily basis on ITV. It is hosted by Emma Willis and the coaches are will.i.am, Pixie Lott and Danny Jones. Daniel Davies won the competition and Pixie Lott was the winning coach for the second year in a row.

== Teams ==
Colour key:

- Winner
- Finalist
- Eliminated in the Semi-final
- Eliminated in the Battles

Coach	Top 36 Artists			
will.i.am				
will.i.am	Sienna-Leigh Campbell	Yaroslav Yakubchuk	Kori Campbell	Mandy Scarlett
will.i.am	Jude Ponting	Persia Siddiqui	Krishna Shil	Savannah Munroe
will.i.am	Zoë Forward	Natasha Seth	Kobi Ry	Astrid Smith
Pixie Lott				
Pixie Lott	Daniel Davies	Lilia Slattery	Alice Page	Will Callan
Pixie Lott	Ella Thomas	Shaney-Lee Pool	Ciaran Heggarty	Lauren Mia Jones
Pixie Lott	Phoebe Maddison	Jimmy Rey	Pardis Ajala	Holly Aitken
Danny Jones				
Danny Jones	Drew Gudojc	Harry Romer	Brooke Burke	Lucy Thomas
Danny Jones	Josh Lima	Lola Gorrod	Jennifer King	J'Ci Ama
Danny Jones	Zoë Curry	Jessie Dale	Charlie Dillon	Jacob Norton

== Blind auditions ==
Colour key

✔	Coach hit his/her "I WANT YOU" button
	Artist defaulted to this coach's team
	Artist elected to join this coach's team
	Artist eliminated with no coach pressing his or her "I WANT YOU" button
	Artist received an 'All Turn'.

=== Episode 1 (14 July) ===
Order	Artist	Age	Song	Coach's and contestant's choices		
Order	Artist	Age	Song	will.i.am	Pixie	Danny
1	Shaney-Lee Pool	7	"Take Me Home, Country Roads"	—	✔	—
2	Jacob Norton	14	"Puttin' on the Ritz"	✔	✔	✔
3	Lilia Slattery	10	"Flashlight"	✔	✔	✔
4	Lucia Cochrane	13	"Fallin'"	—	—	—
5	Jude Ponting	13	"When I Was Your Man"	✔	—	✔
6	Drew Gudojc	14	"This is Gospel"	✔	—	✔
7	Daniel Davies	14	"Seasons of Love"	✔	✔	✔
8	Isaac Phillips	13	"Get Stupid"	—	—	—
9	Natasha Seth	13	"Sorry Not Sorry"	✔	✔	✔
10	Sienna-Leigh Campbell	14	"I Know Where I've Been"	✔	✔	✔

=== Episode 2 (15 July) ===
Order	Artist	Age	Song	Coach's and contestant's choices		
Order	Artist	Age	Song	will.i.am	Pixie	Danny
1	Ciaran Heggarty	13	"Sax"	✔	✔	✔
2	Krishna Shil	10	"How Deep is Your Love"	✔	—	—
3	Holly Aitken	14	"One Last Song"	—	✔	✔
4	Hannah McCann	12	"Everybody Needs a Best Friend"	—	—	—
5	Lauren Mia Jones	14	"All I Want"	—	✔	✔
6	Astrid Smith	8	"God Bless the Child"	✔	—	—
7	Josh Lima	13	"Rollover DJ"	—	—	✔
8	Lauren	12 or 13	"Hallelujah"	—	—	—
9	Will Callan	14	"Both Sides Now"	—	✔	✔
10	Zoë Curry	14	"1234"	—	—	✔
11	Yaroslav Yakubchuk	11	"Nessun dorma"	✔	✔	✔

=== Episode 3 (16 July) ===
Order	Artist	Age	Song	Coach's and contestant's choices		
Order	Artist	Age	Song	will.i.am	Pixie	Danny
1	Brooke Burke	9	"Don't Stop Me Now"	✔	✔	✔
2	Harry Romer	14	"Too Much to Ask"	✔	—	✔
3	Ella Thomas	13	"Don't Rain on My Parade"	—	✔	—
4	Kori Campbell	11	"All My Life"	✔	—	✔
5	Riley Levene	10	"Non Je Ne Regrette Rien"	—	—	—
6	Phoebe Maddison	14	"With You"	—	✔	—
7	Mandy Scarlett	10	"Move"	✔	✔	✔
8	Lola Gorrod	14	"Like I'm Gonna Lose You"	—	—	✔
9	Charlie Dillon	13	"Baby"	—	✔	✔
10	Lilia	10	"Dream A Little Dream Of Me"	—	—	—
11	Lucy Thomas	13	"Moon River"	—	✔	✔

=== Episode 4 (17 July) ===
Order	Artist	Age	Song	Coach's and contestant's choices		
Order	Artist	Age	Song	will.i.am	Pixie	Danny
1	Persia Siddiqui	14	"Habanera"	✔	—	—
2	Savannah Munroe	7	"Don't You Worry 'bout a Thing"	✔	✔	✔
3	Jacob	13	"I Want You Back"	—	—	—
4	J'Ci Ama	13	"Stormy Weather"	—	✔	✔
5	Kobi Ry	11	"Senorita"	✔	—	✔
6	Imani-Renee	11	"Take Me to the King"	—	—	—
7	Jimmy Rey	14	"Grow Up"	—	✔	—
8	Alice Page	14	"One and Only"	—	✔	—
9	Jennifer King	10	"Call Me Maybe"	–	–	✔
10	Zoë Forward	13	"Wade in the Water"	✔	–	–
11	Mykee-D Worman	13	"Opportunity"	Team full	–	–
12	Pardis Ajala	13	"Summertime"	Team full	✔	✔
13	Jessie Dale	12	"Don't Kill My Vibe"	Team full	Team full	✔

== Battle rounds ==
Colour key

Artist won the Battle and advanced to the Semi-final
Artist lost the Battle and was eliminated

=== Episode 1 (18 July) ===
Order	Coach	Artists			Song
1	Pixie Lott	Shaney-Lee Pool	Lilia Slattery	Jimmy Rey	"ABC"
2	Danny Jones	Jacob Norton	Lucy Thomas	J'Ci Ama	"Smile"
3	will.i.am	Yaroslav Yakubchuk	Persia Siddiqui	Natasha Seth	"Bring Me to Life"
4	Danny Jones	Drew Gudojc	Josh Lima	Zoë Curry	"Feel It Still"
5	will.i.am	Astrid Smith	Savannah Munroe	Mandy Scarlett	"It's Oh So Quiet"
6	Pixie Lott	Phoebe Maddison	Daniel Davies	Ella Thomas	"This Is Me"

=== Episode 2 (19 July) ===
Order	Coach	Artists			Song
1	will.i.am	Jude Ponting	Sienna-Leigh Campbell	Zoë Forward	"Almost Is Never Enough"
2	Danny Jones	Jennifer King	Charlie Dillon	Brooke Burke	"Don't Be So Hard on Yourself"
3	Pixie Lott	Alice Page	Pardis Ajala	Ciaran Heggarty	"Symphony"
4	Danny Jones	Harry Romer	Jessie Dale	Lola Gorrod	"Want You Back"
5	will.i.am	Kori Campbell	Krishna Shil	Kobi Ry	"Something Just like This"
6	Pixie Lott	Lauren Mia Jones	Will Callan	Holly Aitken	"God Only Knows"

== Show details ==
=== Results summary ===
Team's colour key
Team Will
Team Pixie
Team Danny

Result's colour key
Artist received the most public votes
Artist was eliminated
Finalist

Results per artist
Contestant	Semi-final	Final
Daniel Davies	Safe	Winner
Lilia Slattery	Safe	Finalist
Sienna-Leigh Campbell	Safe	Finalist
Yaroslav Yakubchuk	Safe	Finalist
Drew Gudojc	Safe	Finalist
Harry Romer	Safe	Finalist
Alice Page	Eliminated	Eliminated (Semi-Finals)
Will Callan	Eliminated	Eliminated (Semi-Finals)
Kori Campbell	Eliminated	Eliminated (Semi-Finals)
Mandy Scarlett	Eliminated	Eliminated (Semi-Finals)
Brooke Burke	Eliminated	Eliminated (Semi-Finals)
Lucy Thomas	Eliminated	Eliminated (Semi-Finals)

==== Semi-final (20 July) ====
Order	Coach	Artists	Song	Result
1	Danny Jones	Harry Romer	"Forever Young"	Advanced
2	Danny Jones	Brooke Burke	"Til I'm Done"	Eliminated
3	Danny Jones	Drew Gudojc	"Look What You Made Me Do"	Advanced
4	Danny Jones	Lucy Thomas	"Wolves"	Eliminated
5	will.i.am	Mandy Scarlett	"The Climb"	Eliminated
6	will.i.am	Yaroslav Yakubchuk	"La donna è mobile"	Advanced
7	will.i.am	Kori Campbell	"Wake Me Up"	Eliminated
8	will.i.am	Sienna-Leigh Campbell	"Halo"	Advanced
9	Pixie Lott	Lilia Slattery	"I Wanna Dance with Somebody (Who Loves Me)"	Advanced
10	Pixie Lott	Will Callan	"Thinkin Bout You"	Eliminated
11	Pixie Lott	Alice Page	"Perfect"	Eliminated
12	Pixie Lott	Daniel Davies	"The Voice Within"	Advanced

==== Live final (21 July) ====
- Group performances: The Final 6 with coaches ("Mr. Blue Sky")
- Musical guests: Donel Mangena ("Bang Like a Drum") and Kylie Minogue ("Golden")

Order	Coach	Artist	Song	Result
1	Pixie Lott	Lilia Slattery	"Something's Got a Hold on Me"	Finalist
2	Danny Jones	Harry Romer	"Blinded by Your Grace, Pt. 2"	Finalist
3	will.i.am	Sienna-Leigh Campbell	"Beautiful"	Finalist
4	Danny Jones	Drew Gudojc	"Survivor"	Finalist
5	will.i.am	Yaroslav Yakubchuk	"Largo Al Factotum"	Finalist
6	Pixie Lott	Daniel Davies	"Anytime You Need a Friend"	Winner
