= The Voice Kids (British TV series) series 5 =

Fifth series of The Voice Kids

The Voice Kids
- Series 5
- Hosted by: Emma Willis (ITV); AJ Odudu (ITV Hub)
- Coaches: will.i.am; Pixie Lott; Danny Jones; Melanie C
- Winner: Torrin Cuthill
- Winning coach: Melanie C
- No. of episodes: 3

Release
- Original network: ITV; ITV Hub (The V Room)
- Original release: 27 December – 29 December 2021

Series chronology
- ← Previous; Series 4 Next → Series 6

The Voice Kids is a British television music competition to find new singing talent. The fifth series began airing on 27 December 2021, on ITV. The series was confirmed by ITV and applications opened in August 2020. Emma Willis returns to present the series. Danny Jones, Pixie Lott and will.i.am return as coaches, whilst on 7 February 2021, it was announced that Melanie C would replace Paloma Faith as a coach, who left after one series due to her pregnancy. Filming for the blind auditions began on 13 February 2021, whilst the final was pre-recorded on 13 March 2021, for which public voting was limited to fans in the auditorium. It was announced that the series would contain three episodes – two blind auditions and the final – aired over three consecutive nights, with the show concluding on 29 December.

Torrin Cuthill won the competition, marking Melanie C's first and only win as a coach. For the first time in the show's history, Christmas songs were included.

== Teams ==
Colour key:

- Winner
- Finalist
- Eliminated in the Battles

Coach	Top 16 Artists			
will.i.am	Leo Gandanzara	Angel Lunda	Tino D'Souza	Sienna Hopkins
Melanie C	Torrin Cuthill	Ndana Chinyoka	Mila Hayes	Fiona Vargas
Pixie Lott	Savannah Lily Boak	Michaela Mutambira	Eva Ossei Gerning	Emily Flanagan
Danny Jones	Aishling Mae Bontoyan	Joseph Sheppard	Becky Peters	Alby Welch

== Blind auditions ==
Blind auditions colour key
✔	Coach pressed "I WANT YOU" button
	Artist defaulted to this coach's team
	Artist elected to join this coach's team
	Artist eliminated as no coach pressed his or her "I WANT YOU" button
	Artist received an 'All Turn'.

=== Episode 1 (27 December) ===
Episode one results
Order	Artist	Age	Song	Coach's and contestant's choices			
Order	Artist	Age	Song	will.i.am	Melanie C	Pixie	Danny
1	Michaela Mutambira	11	"Everybody's Free (To Feel Good)"	✔	–	✔	✔
2	Torrin Cuthill	14	"Days Like This"	–	✔	–	–
3	Leo Gandanzara	14	"Park That Benz" (original song)	✔	✔	✔	✔
4	Tommy Featherstone	12	"Holding Out for a Hero"	–	–	–	–
5	Aishling Mae Bontoyan	14	"Have Yourself a Merry Little Christmas"	–	–	–	✔
6	Savannah Lily Boak	13	"Goodbye Yellow Brick Road"	–	✔	✔	✔
7	Joseph Sheppard	11	"Teenage Dirtbag"	–	✔	–	✔
8	Archie Horan	9	"Sherry"	–	–	–	–
9	Ndana Chinyoka	14	"Cuz I Love You"	–	✔	–	–
10	Angel Lunda	12	"You Raise Me Up"	✔	✔	✔	✔

=== Episode 2 (28 December) ===
Episode two results
Order	Artist	Age	Song	Coach's and contestant's choices			
Order	Artist	Age	Song	will.i.am	Melanie C	Pixie	Danny
1	Tino D'Souza	14	"Ave Maria"	✔	✔	✔	✔
2	Mila Hayes	10	"Santa Claus Is Comin' to Town"	–	✔	✔	–
3	Joshey Newynskyj	9	"Walking in the Air"	–	–	–	–
4	Becky Peters	14	"Falling"	–	–	–	✔
5	Eva Ossei Gerning	11	"A Little Love"	✔	–	✔	–
6	Sienna Hopkins	13	"Sorry Not Sorry"	✔	–	–	–
7	Alby Welch	13	"The First Time Ever I Saw Your Face"	Team full	–	–	✔
8	Emily Flanagan	13	"Danny Boy"	Team full	–	✔	Team full
9	Mackenzie Lawlor	14	"Believer"	Team full	–	Team full	Team full
10	Fiona Vargas	13	"Always Remember Us This Way"	Team full	✔	Team full	Team full

== Show details ==
=== Results summary ===
Team's colour key
Team Will
Team Melanie C
Team Pixie
Team Danny

Result's colour key
Artist received the most public votes
Runner-up
Third Finalist
Artist received the least public votes
Artist was eliminated

Results per artist
Contestant	Battles round	Grand Final
Torrin Cuthill	Safe	Winner
Aishling Mae Bontoyan	Safe	Runner-up
Savannah Lily Boak	Safe	Third Place
Leo Gandanzara	Safe	Fourth Place
Emily Flanagan	Eliminated	Eliminated (Battles round)
Eva Ossei Gerning	Eliminated	Eliminated (Battles round)
Michaela Mutambira	Eliminated	Eliminated (Battles round)
Alby Welch	Eliminated	Eliminated (Battles round)
Becky Peters	Eliminated	Eliminated (Battles round)
Joseph Sheppard	Eliminated	Eliminated (Battles round)
Angel Lunda	Eliminated	Eliminated (Battles round)
Sienna Hopkins	Eliminated	Eliminated (Battles round)
Tino D'Souza	Eliminated	Eliminated (Battles round)
Fiona Vargas	Eliminated	Eliminated (Battles round)
Mila Hayes	Eliminated	Eliminated (Battles round)
Ndana Chinyoka	Eliminated	Eliminated (Battles round)

=== Final (29 December) ===
==== Battles round ====
Battles colour key
Artist won the Battle and advanced to the Grand Final
Artist lost the Battle and was eliminated

Battles results
Order	Coach	Artists				Song
1	Melanie C	Torrin Cuthill	Ndana Chinyoka	Mila Hayes	Fiona Vargas	"Proud Mary"
2	will.i.am	Leo Gandanzara	Angel Lunda	Tino D'Souza	Sienna Hopkins	"Just the Way You Are"
3	Danny Jones	Aishling Mae Bontoyan	Joseph Sheppard	Becky Peters	Alby Welch	"Blackbird"
4	Pixie Lott	Savannah Lily Boak	Michaela Mutambira	Eva Ossei Gerning	Emily Flanagan	"The Impossible Dream (The Quest)"

==== Grand Final ====
Final results
Order	Coach	Artist	Song	Result
1	Pixie Lott	Savannah Lily Boak	"O Holy Night"	Third Place
2	will.i.am	Leo Gandanzara	"Carol of the Bells" (original song)	Fourth Place
3	Danny Jones	Aishling Mae Bontoyan	"Last Christmas"	Runner-up
4	Melanie C	Torrin Cuthill	"Auld Lang Syne"	Winner
