= The Voice Kids (British TV series) series 3 =

Third series of The Voice Kids

The Voice Kids
- Series 3
- Hosted by: Emma Willis (ITV); AJ Odudu (ITV Hub)
- Coaches: will.i.am; Pixie Lott; Danny Jones; Jessie J
- Winner: Sam Wilkinson
- Winning coach: Danny Jones
- No. of episodes: 8

Release
- Original network: ITV; ITV Hub (The V Room)
- Original release: 8 June – 27 July 2019

Series chronology
- ← Previous; Series 2 Next → Series 4

The Voice Kids is a British television music competition to find new singing talent. The third series began airing on 8 June 2019, being broadcast on a weekly basis on ITV. As with the previous two series, it was hosted by Emma Willis. Danny Jones, Pixie Lott and will.i.am returned as coaches and were joined by a fourth coach, Jessie J, who was previously a coach on the adult version of the show. Sam Wilkinson won the competition and Danny Jones was the winning coach.

== Teams ==
Colour key:

- Winner
- Runner-up
- Third Place
- Fourth Place
- Eliminated in the Semi-final
- Eliminated in the Battles

Coach	Top 36 Artists		
will.i.am			
will.i.am	Lil Shan Shan	David Adderley & Ammani Bengo	Raphael Higgins-Humes
will.i.am	Peyton Chu	Jamie Cushion	Rosa O'Reilly
will.i.am	Alfie King & Ava MacFarlane	T'mya Fyffe	The Mack Man
Jessie J			
Jessie J	Keira Laver	Amaree Ali	Pheobie Lola
Jessie J	Connie Emery	Aiysha Russell	Charley Jones
Jessie J	Jazzy Bolton	Adi Nair	Harry Hatcher
Pixie Lott			
Pixie Lott	Gracie-Jayne Fitzgerald	Chloe Dring	Liam Price
Pixie Lott	Caillin Joe	Sweet Harmony	Aimee Bryceland
Pixie Lott	Colin Justin	Holly Taylor-Tuck & Emily Linge	Lucy Simmonds
Danny Jones			
Danny Jones	Sam Wilkinson	Conor Marcus	Joslyn Plant
Danny Jones	Ivy Pratt	Martha Moxon	Mykee-D Worman
Danny Jones	Ryan Lofthouse	Wren Snaith	Danny Corbo

== Blind auditions ==
Colour key

✔	Coach hit his/her "I WANT YOU" button
	Artist defaulted to this coach's team
	Artist elected to join this coach's team
	Artist eliminated with no coach pressing his or her "I WANT YOU" button
	Artist received an 'All Turn'.

=== Episode 1 (8 June) ===
Order	Artist	Age	Song	Coach's and contestant's choices			
Order	Artist	Age	Song	will.i.am	Jessie J	Pixie	Danny
1	Alfie King & Ava MacFarlane	10 & 9	"Photograph"	✔	–	–	–
2	Ivy Pratt	12	"Bye Bye Bye"	✔	✔	✔	✔
3	Charley Jones	13	"Ex-Factor"	✔	✔	–	✔
4	Lucas Paschoal	12	"Our House"	–	–	–	–
5	Sam Wilkinson	13	"Like a Rolling Stone"	–	–	✔	✔
6	Caillin Joe	10	"The Irish Rover"	–	–	✔	–
7	David Adderley & Ammani Bengo	14	"Let's Get It Started"	✔	✔	✔	✔
8	Alexandra	14	"Make Your Own Kind of Music"	–	–	–	–
9	Amaree Ali	14	"All in Love Is Fair"	–	✔	✔	–
10	Liam Price	12	"Lean on Me"	✔	✔	✔	✔

=== Episode 2 (15 June) ===
Order	Artist	Age	Song	Coach's and contestant's choices			
Order	Artist	Age	Song	will.i.am	Jessie J	Pixie	Danny
1	Lil Shan Shan	10	"Supersonic"	✔	✔	✔	✔
2	Conor Marcus	13	"That Girl I Met" (original song)	–	–	–	✔
3	Erik Antonyan	12	"Saturday Night"	–	–	–	–
4	Keira Laver	9	"Neverland"	✔	✔	✔	✔
5	Aimee Bryceland	14	"Meet You at the Moon"	–	–	✔	–
6	Rosa O'Reilly	11	"Waka Waka (This Time for Africa)"	✔	–	–	–
7	Adi Nair	14	"Sweet Creature"	–	✔	✔	✔
8	Sweet Harmony	13 & 12	"Hey Brother"	–	–	✔	✔
9	Freddie J Meyer	12	"Salute"	–	–	–	–
10	Gracie-Jayne Fitzgerald	12	"Golden Slumbers"	✔	–	✔	✔
11	Mykee-D Worman	14	"Ain't Nobody"	–	–	–	✔

=== Episode 3 (22 June) ===
Order	Artist	Age	Song	Coach's and contestant's choices			
Order	Artist	Age	Song	will.i.am	Jessie J	Pixie	Danny
1	Jazzy Bolton	10	"If I Go"	✔	✔	✔	✔
2	Ryan Lofthouse	14	"Dancing in the Dark"	–	–	–	✔
3	The Mack Man	13	"Perm"	✔	–	–	–
4	Aiysha Russell	13	"What a Diff'rence a Day Makes"	–	✔	–	✔
5	Liv	13	"Thursday"	–	–	–	–
6	Logann	13	"100 Days, 100 Nights"	–	–	–	–
7	Colin Justin	10	"You Make Me Feel So Young"	–	–	✔	✔
8	Peyton Chu	7	"Colors of the Wind"	✔	✔	✔	–
9	Wren Snaith	14	"Leave (Get Out)"	–	–	–	✔
10	Danny Corbo	13	"We Are Stars"	✔	–	✔	✔
11	Gracie O'Brien	13	"It's Quiet Uptown"	–	–	–	–
12	Chloe Dring	11	"She Used to Be Mine"	–	–	✔	–

=== Episode 4 (29 June) ===
Order	Artist	Age	Song	Coach's and contestant's choices			
Order	Artist	Age	Song	will.i.am	Jessie J	Pixie	Danny
1	Raphael Higgins-Humes	13	"You Can't Stop the Beat"	✔	✔	–	✔
2	Connie Emery	11	"I Turn to You"	–	✔	✔	✔
3	Jovani	14	"Love Yourself"	–	–	–	–
4	Joslyn Plant	11	"Run"	–	–	✔	✔
5	Holly Taylor-Tuck & Emily Linge	10 & 11	"Someone Out There"	–	–	✔	–
6	Harry Hatcher	13	"Who You Are"	–	✔	–	–
7	T'mya Fyffe	12	"I Will Always Love You"	✔	–	—	–
8	Jack Martin	12	"Please Don't Say You Love Me"	–	–	–	–
9	Pheobie Lola	13	"Feels Like Home"	–	✔	–	–
10	Lucy Simmonds	13	"Memory"	–	Team full	✔	–
11	Jamie Cushion	13	"I Need"	✔	Team full	Team full	✔
12	Freddie F	13	"Drag Me Down"	Team full	Team full	Team full	–
13	Martha Moxon	13	"How Will I Know"	Team full	Team full	Team full	✔

== Battle rounds ==
Colour key

Artist won the Battle and advanced to the Semi-final
Artist lost the Battle and was eliminated

=== Episode 1 (6 July) ===
Order	Coach	Artists			Song
1	will.i.am	Rosa O'Reilly	Raphael Higgins-Humes	The Mack Man	"Do Your Thing"
2	Jessie J	Aiysha Russell	Amaree Ali	Adi Nair	"You've Got a Friend"
3	Pixie Lott	Caillin Joe	Colin Justin	Gracie-Jayne Fitzgerald	"Let's Face the Music and Dance"
4	Danny Jones	Conor Marcus	Martha Moxon	Wren Snaith	"With or Without You"
5	Jessie J	Keira Laver	Connie Emery	Jazzy Bolton	"Rewrite the Stars"
6	Pixie Lott	Aimee Bryceland	Liam Price	Lucy Simmonds	"Emotion"

=== Episode 2 (13 July) ===
Order	Coach	Artists			Song
1	will.i.am	Peyton Chu	Alfie King & Ava MacFarlane	Lil Shan Shan	"See You Again"
2	Danny Jones	Mykee-D Worman	Danny Corbo	Joslyn Plant	"High Hopes"
3	Pixie Lott	Sweet Harmony	Chloe Dring	Holly Taylor-Tuck & Emily Linge	"Never Forget"
4	will.i.am	Jamie Cushion	T'mya Fyffe	David Adderley & Ammani Bengo	"No Tears Left to Cry"
5	Jessie J	Charley Jones	Harry Hatcher	Pheobie Lola	"All I Am"
6	Danny Jones	Sam Wilkinson	Ivy Pratt	Ryan Lofthouse	"Under Pressure"

== Show details ==
=== Results summary ===
Team's colour key
Team Will
Team Jessie
Team Pixie
Team Danny

Result's colour key
Artist received the most public votes
Runner-up
Third Finalist
Artist received the least public votes

Artist was eliminated

Results per artist
Contestant	Semi-final	Final
Sam Wilkinson	Safe	Winner
Keira Laver	Safe	Runner-Up
Lil Shan Shan	Safe	Third Place
Gracie-Jayne Fitzgerald	Safe	Fourth Place
Chloe Dring	Eliminated	Eliminated (Semi-Finals)
Liam Price	Eliminated	Eliminated (Semi-Finals)
Conor Marcus	Eliminated	Eliminated (Semi-Finals)
Joslyn Plant	Eliminated	Eliminated (Semi-Finals)
Amaree Ali	Eliminated	Eliminated (Semi-Finals)
Pheobie Lola	Eliminated	Eliminated (Semi-Finals)
David Adderley & Ammani Bengo	Eliminated	Eliminated (Semi-Finals)
Raphael Higgins-Humes	Eliminated	Eliminated (Semi-Finals)

==== Semi-final (20 July) ====
Order	Coach	Artists	Song	Result
1	will.i.am	Raphael Higgins-Humes	"Uptown Funk"	Eliminated
2	will.i.am	David Adderley & Ammani Bengo	"Can't Stop"	Eliminated
3	will.i.am	Lil Shan Shan	"Pricey"	Advanced
4	Jessie J	Keira Laver	"Zero to Hero"	Advanced
5	Jessie J	Amaree Ali	"What the World Needs Now is Love"	Eliminated
6	Jessie J	Pheobie Lola	"True Colours"	Eliminated
7	Danny Jones	Conor Marcus	"Hey, Soul Sister"	Eliminated
8	Danny Jones	Joslyn Plant	"High Five"	Eliminated
9	Danny Jones	Sam Wilkinson	"Father and Son"	Advanced
10	Pixie Lott	Liam Price	"Without You"	Eliminated
11	Pixie Lott	Gracie-Jayne Fitzgerald	"Many Rivers to Cross"	Advanced
12	Pixie Lott	Chloe Dring	"Warrior"	Eliminated

==== Live final (27 July) ====
Each artist performed a duet alongside their coach in addition to their main performance.

- Group performances: The Coaches ("Faith")
- Musical guests: Little Mix ("Bounce Back")

Order	Coach	Artist	Song	Order	Duet (with Coach)	Result
1	Pixie Lott	Gracie-Jayne Fitzgerald	"Feeling Good"	6	"River Deep - Mountain High"	Fourth Place
2	will.i.am	Lil Shan Shan	"Sweet Tooth" (original song)	5	"Pump It"	Third Place
3	Jessie J	Keira Laver	"Can You Feel the Love Tonight"	8	"When You Believe"	Runner-up
4	Danny Jones	Sam Wilkinson	"Everything’s Alright" (original song)	7	"Hey Jude"	Winner
