= The Voice Kids (British TV series) series 4 =

Fourth series of The Voice Kids

The Voice Kids
- Series 4
- Hosted by: Emma Willis (ITV); AJ Odudu (ITV Hub)
- Coaches: will.i.am; Pixie Lott; Danny Jones; Paloma Faith
- Winner: Justine Afante
- Winning coach: Pixie Lott
- No. of episodes: 8

Release
- Original network: ITV; ITV Hub (The V Room)
- Original release: 11 July – 29 August 2020

Series chronology
- ← Previous; Series 3 Next → Series 5

The Voice Kids is a British television music competition to find new singing talent. The fourth series began airing on 11 July 2020, being broadcast on a weekly basis on ITV. As with the previous three series, it is hosted by Emma Willis. Danny Jones, Pixie Lott and will.i.am will return as coaches, but Jessie J was replaced by Paloma Faith, who was also previously a coach on the adult version of the show.

Due to the COVID-19 pandemic, the pre-recorded episodes - featuring the auditions, battle rounds and semi-final - were filmed a few weeks before the nationwide lockdown in March 2020. On 7 August 2020, it was announced that the final would be pre-recorded on 22 August 2020 and broadcast a week later on 29 August 2020, with a virtual audience with households invited to apply to watch the episode and vote for their winner. Justine Afante won the competition and Pixie Lott was the winning coach, marking her third victory, becoming the only UK coach in any variation to win more than 2 seasons.

== Teams ==
Colour key:

- Winner
- Runner-up
- Third Place
- Fourth Place
- Eliminated in the Semi-final
- Eliminated in the Battles

Coach	Top 36 Artists		
will.i.am			
will.i.am	Victoria Alsina	Amos Thakid	Savannah Sunique
will.i.am	Ruby Maher	Ray-Tee Turner	Fraya Ofoeme
will.i.am	Misha Elin	Thaila Charles	Lilly Hobbs
Paloma Faith			
Paloma Faith	Dara McNicholl	Hayley Karinge	Isla Croll
Paloma Faith	Rachel O'Donnell	James Hodgkinson	Ruby Wellsted
Paloma Faith	Heidi Katona	Sonny Killington	Ruby Johnson
Pixie Lott			
Pixie Lott	Justine Afante	Joshua Regala	Rae Harding
Pixie Lott	Jemima Penny	Maylah Renee	Lydia Beech
Pixie Lott	Jae-Jai Saunders	Ned Payne	Aadya Rajwanshi
Danny Jones			
Danny Jones	George Elliott	Blair Gilmour	Gracie O'Brien
Danny Jones	Jimmy Aska Winch	Connie Burgess	Daria Pando
Danny Jones	Nessa & Cathal Markham	Asher Bhatti	Jarren Garcia

== Blind auditions ==
Colour key

✔	Coach hit his/her "I WANT YOU" button
	Artist defaulted to this coach's team
	Artist elected to join this coach's team
	Artist eliminated with no coach pressing his or her "I WANT YOU" button
	Artist received an 'All Turn'.

=== Episode 1 (11 July) ===
Order	Artist	Age	Song	Coach's and contestant's choices			
Order	Artist	Age	Song	will.i.am	Paloma	Pixie	Danny
1	Dara McNicholl	12	"I Have Nothing"	✔	✔	✔	✔
2	Jimmy Aska Winch	7	"Parklife"	–	–	✔	✔
3	Lydia Beech	13	"Your Song"	–	✔	✔	–
4	Mark Morrison	14	"Wake Me Up"	–	–	–	–
5	Victoria Alsina	7	"How Far I'll Go"	✔	–	–	–
6	George Elliott	10	"Plug In Baby"	–	✔	–	✔
7	Hayley Karinge	12	"Stand by Me"	✔	✔	✔	✔
8	Ray-Tee Turner	12	"That's Not Me"	✔	✔	✔	✔
9	Betsy & Nancy Burgess	10	"Bring Me Sunshine"	–	–	–	–
10	Connie Burgess	14	"Somewhere"	–	–	✔	✔

=== Episode 2 (18 July) ===
Order	Artist	Age	Song	Coach's and contestant's choices			
Order	Artist	Age	Song	will.i.am	Paloma	Pixie	Danny
1	Rachel O'Donnell	10	"I Want to Be a Cowboy's Sweetheart"	✔	✔	✔	✔
2	Rae Harding	11	"Footprints in the Sand"	✔	–	✔	–
3	Thaila Charles	11	"I Like It"	✔	–	–	–
4	James Hodgkinson	12	"You'll Never Walk Alone"	–	✔	–	–
5	Cree Henson	14	"Real Love"	–	–	–	–
6	Gracie O'Brien	14	"You Don't Have to Say You Love Me"	–	–	–	✔
7	Aadya Rajwanshi	10	"Cheap Thrills" / "Pehli Nazar Mein"	✔	✔	✔	✔
8	Savannah Sunique	13	"Killing Me Softly with His Song"	✔	–	–	✔
9	Vic Reeves	14	"Lips Are Movin'"	–	–	–	–
10	Blair Gilmour	13	"The Bucket"	–	✔	✔	✔
11	Joshua Regala	14	"You Are the Reason"	✔	✔	✔	✔

=== Episode 3 (25 July) ===
Order	Artist	Age	Song	Coach's and contestant's choices			
Order	Artist	Age	Song	will.i.am	Paloma	Pixie	Danny
1	Fraya Ofoeme	13	"On My Mind"	✔	✔	–	–
2	Isla Croll	14	"Summertime"	✔	✔	✔	✔
3	Lola Harris	9	"Count On Me"	–	–	–	–
4	Daria Pando	14	"Libiamo"	–	–	–	✔
5	Amos Thakid	13	"Ladbroke Grove"	✔	✔	–	–
6	Ruby Wellsted	13	"Lullaby"	–	✔	–	–
7	Josh & Ryan	13 & 12	"Everybody (Backstreet's Back)"	–	–	–	–
8	Asher Bhatti	13	"Come Together"	✔	✔	✔	✔
9	Heidi Katona	12	"I Try"	✔	✔	–	✔
10	Jemima Penny	10	"Highway to Hell"	–	–	✔	–
11	Justine Afante	13	"Never Enough"	✔	✔	✔	✔

=== Episode 4 (1 August) ===
Order	Artist	Age	Song	Coach's and contestant's choices			
Order	Artist	Age	Song	will.i.am	Paloma	Pixie	Danny
1	Sonny Killington	13	"Spotlight"	✔	✔	✔	✔
2	Ruby Maher	11	"Shut Up and Dance"	✔	–	–	–
3	Summer & Lucca Newton	11 & 10	"It Takes Two"	–	–	–	–
4	Nessa & Cathal Markham	14 & 12	"I Will Wait"	–	–	–	✔
5	Maylah Renee	14	"Un-Break My Heart"	–	–	✔	–
6	Misha Elin	12	"Confident"	✔	–	–	–
7	Ruby Johnson	14	"Havana"	–	✔	–	–
8	Lachlan	8	"You Make My Dreams"	–	Team full	–	–
9	Ned Payne	14	"Girls Just Want to Have Fun"	–	Team full	✔	✔
10	Lilly Hobbs	13	"Lost Without You"	✔	Team full	–	✔
11	Jae-Jai Saunders	12	"Speechless"	Team full	Team full	✔	–
12	Tiah Davies	13	"Let's Get Loud"	Team full	Team full	Team full	–
13	Jarren Garcia	13	"Just the Way You Are"	Team full	Team full	Team full	✔

== Battle rounds ==
Colour key

Artist won the Battle and advanced to the Semi-final
Artist lost the Battle and was eliminated

=== Episode 1 (8 August) ===
Order	Coach	Artists			Song
1	Danny Jones	Jimmy Aska Winch	George Elliott	Nessa & Cathal Markham	"Got My Mind Set on You"
2	Paloma Faith	James Hodgkinson	Sonny Killington	Hayley Karinge	"Bridge over Troubled Water"
3	will.i.am	Amos Thakid	Thaila Charles	Ray-Tee Turner	"Boasty"
4	Pixie Lott	Lydia Beech	Aadya Rajwanshi	Rae Harding	"Somewhere Only We Know"
5	Paloma Faith	Ruby Wellsted	Ruby Johnson	Isla Croll	"Answerphone"
6	Danny Jones	Daria Pando	Gracie O'Brien	Jarren Garcia	"Barcelona"

=== Episode 2 (15 August) ===
Order	Coach	Artists			Song
1	Danny Jones	Asher Bhatti	Connie Burgess	Blair Gilmour	"XO"
2	Paloma Faith	Rachel O'Donnell	Heidi Katona	Dara McNicholl	"Whenever, Wherever"
3	will.i.am	Lilly Hobbs	Savannah Sunique	Fraya Ofoeme	"I'm Going Down"
4	Pixie Lott	Ned Payne	Maylah Renee	Joshua Regala	"Stop!"
5	will.i.am	Ruby Maher	Victoria Alsina	Misha Elin	"Shake It Off"
6	Pixie Lott	Justine Afante	Jemima Penny	Jae-Jai Saunders	"Rise Up"

== Show details ==
=== Results summary ===
Team's colour key
Team Will
Team Paloma
Team Pixie
Team Danny

Result's colour key
Artist received the most public votes
Runner-up
Third Finalist
Artist received the least public votes
Artist was eliminated

Results per artist
Contestant	Semi-final	Final
Justine Afante	Safe	Winner
Victoria Alsina	Safe	Runner-up
Dara McNicholl	Safe	Third Place
George Elliott	Safe	Fourth Place
Joshua Regala	Eliminated	Eliminated (Semi-Finals)
Rae Harding	Eliminated	Eliminated (Semi-Finals)
Amos Thakid	Eliminated	Eliminated (Semi-Finals)
Savannah Sunique	Eliminated	Eliminated (Semi-Finals)
Hayley Karinge	Eliminated	Eliminated (Semi-Finals)
Isla Croll	Eliminated	Eliminated (Semi-Finals)
Blair Gilmour	Eliminated	Eliminated (Semi-Finals)
Gracie O'Brien	Eliminated	Eliminated (Semi-Finals)

==== Semi-final (22 August) ====
Order	Coach	Artists	Song	Result
1	Danny Jones	George Elliott	"Radio Ga Ga"	Advanced
2	Danny Jones	Gracie O'Brien	"Always on My Mind"	Eliminated
3	Danny Jones	Blair Gilmour	"Power Over Me"	Eliminated
4	Paloma Faith	Isla Croll	"Sweet Love"	Eliminated
5	Paloma Faith	Hayley Karinge	"Rolling in the Deep"	Eliminated
6	Paloma Faith	Dara McNicholl	"Nothing Compares 2 U"	Advanced
7	will.i.am	Savannah Sunique	"Smash Into You"	Eliminated
8	will.i.am	Amos Thakid	"No Violence"	Eliminated
9	will.i.am	Victoria Alsina	"Hero"	Advanced
10	Pixie Lott	Rae Harding	"Reflection"	Eliminated
11	Pixie Lott	Joshua Regala	"Before You Go"	Eliminated
12	Pixie Lott	Justine Afante	"One Moment in Time"	Advanced

==== Final (29 August) ====
Each artist performed a duet alongside their coach in addition to their main performance.

- Group performances: The Coaches ("Praise You")
- Musical guests: Clean Bandit, Mabel and 24kGoldn ("Tick Tock")

Order	Coach	Artist	Song	Order	Duet (with Coach)	Result
1	Pixie Lott	Justine Afante	"Listen"	8	"Don't You Worry 'bout a Thing"	Winner
2	Danny Jones	George Elliott	"When You Were Young"	5	"Born to Run"	Fourth Place
3	Paloma Faith	Dara McNicholl	"Against All Odds"	6	"Ain't No Mountain High Enough"	Third Place
4	will.i.am	Victoria Alsina	"Girl on Fire"	7	"Where Is the Love?"	Runner-up
