= The Voice UK series 12 =

The Voice UK
- Series 12
- Hosted by: Emma Willis
- Coaches: will.i.am; Anne-Marie; Sir Tom Jones; Olly Murs
- Winner: Jen & Liv
- Winning coach: will.i.am (Emma Willis)
- Runners-up: Jolie Stevens; Callum Doignie; Hope Winter
- No. of episodes: 9

Release
- Original network: ITV1
- Original release: 4 November – 30 December 2023

Series chronology
- ← Previous; Series 11 Next → Series 13

The Voice UK is a British television music competition to find new singing talent. The twelfth series of The Voice UK premiered on 4 November 2023 on ITV. will.i.am, Anne-Marie, Sir Tom Jones and Olly Murs returned as coaches, whilst Emma Willis again returned as presenter.

On 30 December 2023, Jen & Liv were announced as the winner of the series, marking will.i.am's second win as a coach on the adult version of the show. Their win marks the second occurrence that a duo won a variation of The Voice UK, the first being done by Shanice & Andrea Nyandoro in the seventh series of The Voice Kids, who were also on Team will.i.am. It also marks the first time in any variation ever that a artist had a different coach turn their official coach's chair during their audition (as host Willis sat in will.i.am's chair for Jen & Liv's audition).

== Coaches ==
Coaches for series 12 of The Voice UK

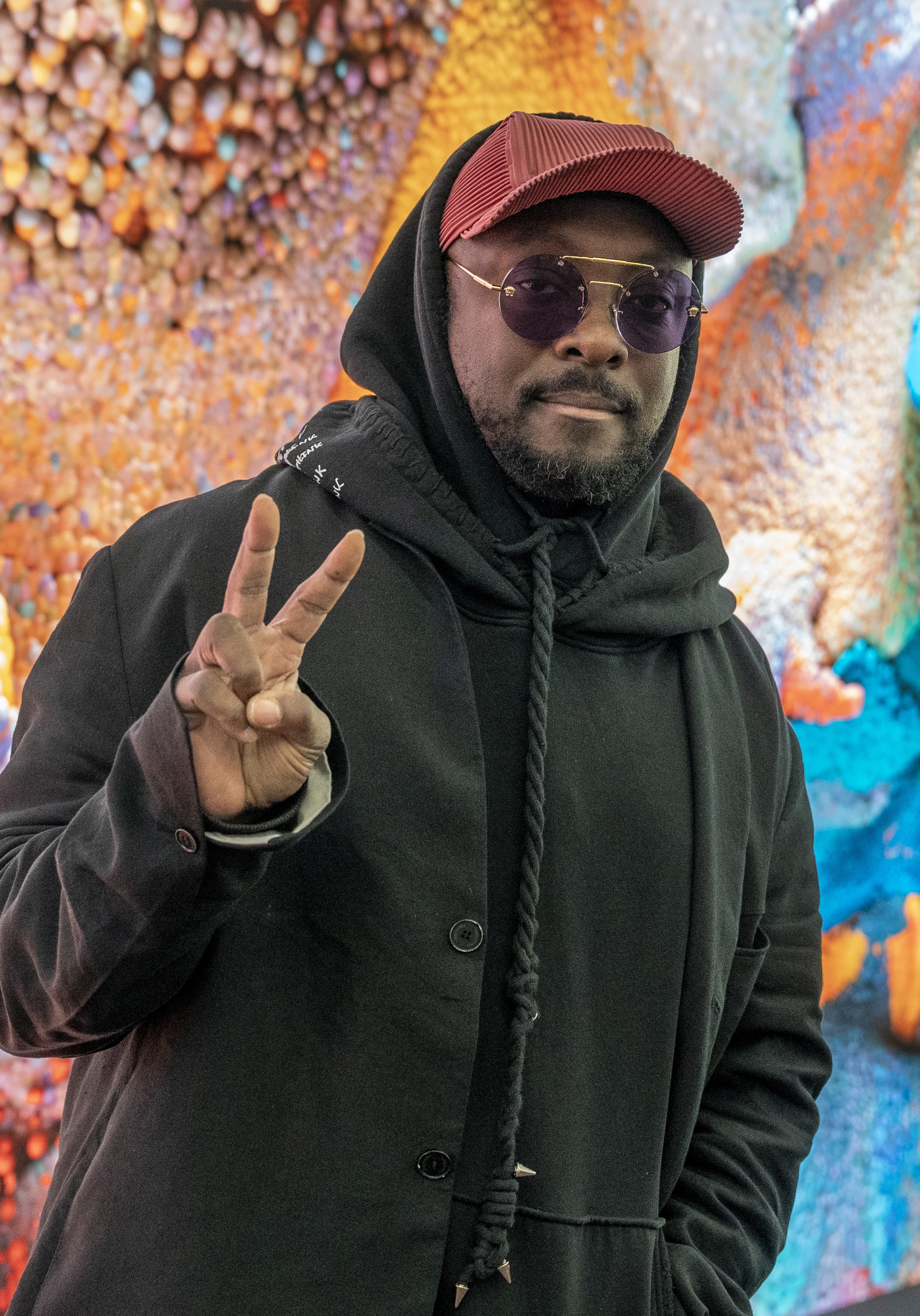
will.i.am

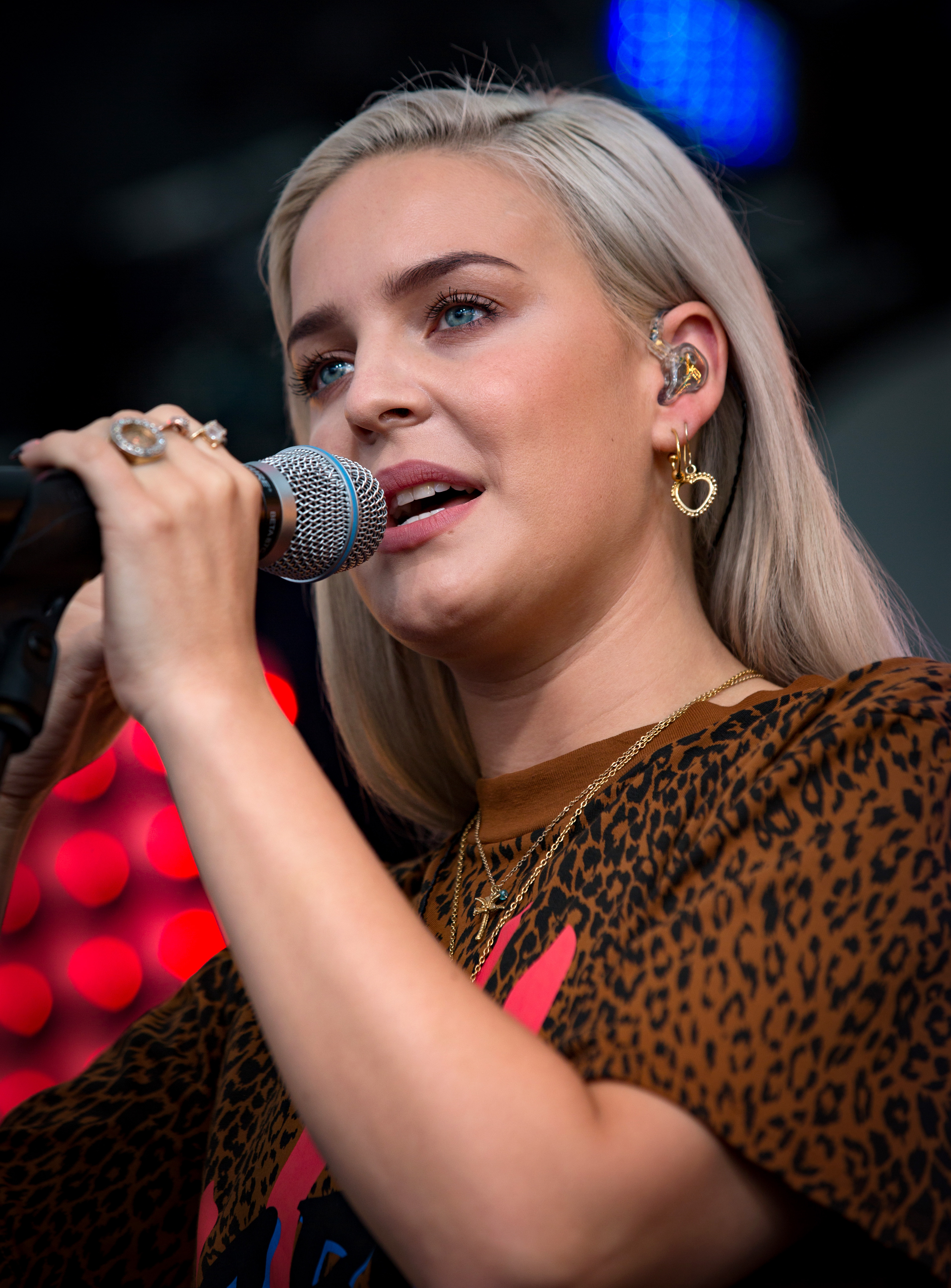
Anne-Marie

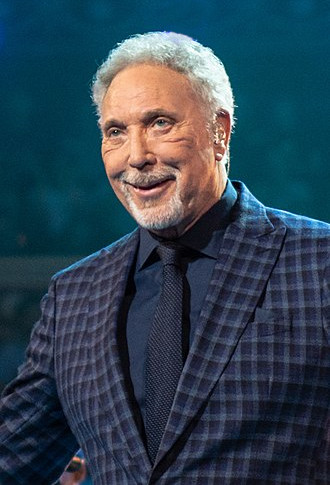
Sir Tom Jones

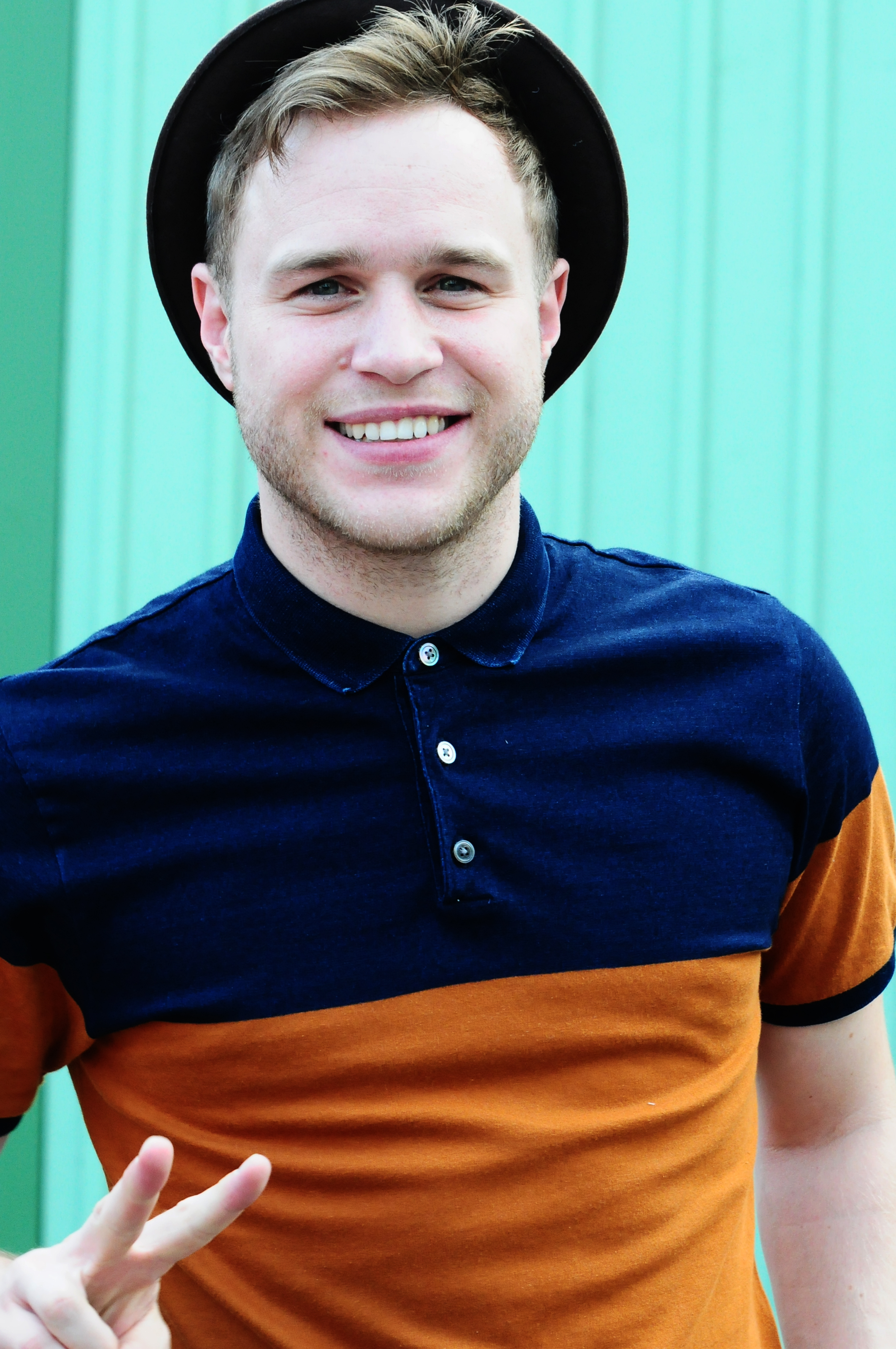
Olly Murs

will.i.am, Anne-Marie, Sir Tom Jones and Olly Murs returned as coaches, whilst Emma Willis returned as the show's presenter.

In September 2023, it was confirmed by Olly Murs himself that since he had been axed from the show for future series, this would be his last as a coach. Speaking of his axing, Murs said he was "gutted" and added that receiving the news was a "bit of a shock".

In October 2023, a week prior to the show's premiere, it was announced that the twelfth series would also be Anne-Marie's last and that she had been "axed from the series" as part of producers' plans to "refresh the show".

== Production ==
Auditions for the twelfth series were held via the usual online application process, as well as various pubs, karaoke bars and open mic nights throughout 2022. Groups were invited to apply for the first time along with the usual soloists, duos and trios. Applications closed in September 2022, and began filming at Dock10 in December 2022.

The first trailer for the series was revealed in October 2023, and featured all four coaches singing along to "Push It" by Salt-N-Pepa, before pushing their buttons and turning around in their chairs.

The series was again pre-recorded, and began on 4 November 2023, the latest the show has ever launched, due to ITV's coverage of the 2023 Rugby World Cup.

The blocked feature would not be returning to the blind auditions due to the controversiality of the button over the media.

== Teams ==
=== Colour key ===
- Winner
- Finalist
- Eliminated in the Semi-Final
- Eliminated in the Callbacks
- Withdrew

Coach	Top 40 Artists				
will.i.am					
will.i.am	Jen & Liv	THePETEBOX	Katie Coleman	Sese Foster	Hayley Chart
will.i.am	Laville	Matt Green	Zaza	Shane Brierley	Cleo Stewart
Anne-Marie					
Anne-Marie	Jolie Stevens	Déjà Vu	Nia Ekanem	Lil Shakz	Chinchilla
Anne-Marie	Ryan Barton	Gwannty	The Skylarks	Valntna	Rachel Burnett
Sir Tom Jones					
Sir Tom Jones	Callum Doignie	Bianca White	AV4C	Jerusha Frimpong	Fatt Butcher
Sir Tom Jones	Daisy Gill	Keilah Rebekah	Jazz Morley	Brendan Sherk	Adaeze
Olly Murs					
Olly Murs	Hope Winter	Kelly Hastings	Stan Urban	Marta Spizhenko	The Ashatones
Olly Murs	Sheridan Coldstream	Jack Desmond	Jess Hayes	Simon Simms	Imisi Peletu

== Blind auditions ==
Blind auditions colour key
✔	Coach pressed "I WANT YOU" button
	Artist defaulted to this coach's team
	Artist elected to join this coach's team
	Artist eliminated with no coach pressing their "I WANT YOU" button
	Artist received an "All Turn"

=== Episode 1 (4 November) ===
- Coach performances: "Stairway to Heaven"
  - will.i.am — "Let's Get It Started"
  - Tom Jones with Stan Urban — "Great Balls of Fire"

Order	Artist	Age	Song	Coaches and artists choices			
Order	Artist	Age	Song	will.i.am	Anne-Marie	Tom	Olly
1	Déjà Vu	19–25	"Unholy"	✔	✔	✔	✔
2	Mitchell Chambers	29	"She Used to Be Mine"	—	—	—	—
3	Jerusha Frimpong	27	"Wish I Didn't Miss You"	✔	—	✔	✔
4	Andre Laville	36	"Perfect Ruin"	✔	✔	✔	✔
5	Yoni Shine	16	"Let It Go"	—	—	—	—
6	Stan Urban	79	"Little Queenie"	—	—	—	✔
7	Lil Shakz	18	"Minimal Things" (original song)	—	✔	—	—
8	Hope Winter	23	"Mirror"	✔	✔	✔	✔

=== Episode 2 (11 November) ===
- Coach performances:
  - Tom Jones — "Sex Bomb"
  - Olly Murs — "Heart Skips a Beat"
  - Anne-Marie — "Kiss My (Uh-Oh)"

Order	Artist	Age	Song	Coaches and artists choices			
Order	Artist	Age	Song	will.i.am	Anne-Marie	Tom	Olly
1	Liam Palmer	19	"XO"	—	—	—	—
2	Jen & Liv	21 & 23	"Woman"	✔ (Note: The show's presenter, Emma Willis, took will.i.am's place as coach for this performance)	✔	✔	✔
3	Callum Doignie	28	"Traitor"	—	—	✔	—
4	Sese Foster	31	"Thinking Out Loud"	✔	✔	—	—
5	Pete Restrick	31	"Love Will Tear Us Apart"	—	—	—	—
6	Chinchilla	25	"I Put a Spell on You"	✔	✔	—	✔
7	Sheridan Coldstream	59	"Listen Before I Go"	—	—	—	✔
8	Bianca White	35	"Chains"	✔	✔	✔	✔

=== Episode 3 (18 November) ===
- Coach performance: Tom Jones & Anne-Marie — "Stand By Me"

Order	Artist	Age	Song	Coaches and artists choices			
Order	Artist	Age	Song	will.i.am	Anne-Marie	Tom	Olly
1	AV4C	32–39	"All My Life"	—	—	✔	—
2	THePETEBOX	—	"Sweet Dreams (Are Made Of This)"	✔	✔	✔	✔
3	Mariama Goodman	44	"Out Here on My Own"	—	—	—	—
4	Gwannty	29	"Essence"	—	✔	✔	✔
5	Marta Spizhenko	33	"Not About Angels"	—	—	—	✔
6	Kurtis Joinson	27	"Damn Your Eyes"	—	—	—	—
7	Nia Ekanem	30	"Let It Be"	—	✔	—	—
8	Fatt Butcher	32	"This Woman's Work"	✔	✔	✔	✔

=== Episode 4 (25 November) ===
- Coach performance—"Rock Around the Clock"

Order	Artist	Age	Song	Coaches and artists choices			
Order	Artist	Age	Song	will.i.am	Anne-Marie	Tom	Olly
1	Daisy Gill	24	"In the Name of Love"	✔	✔	✔	✔
2	Albert Stott	18	"My Heart Goes (La Di Da)"	—	—	—	—
3	Ryan Barton	31	"Just the Two of Us"	—	✔	—	✔
4	Hayley Chart	52	"Sinnerman"	✔	—	—	✔
5	The Ashatones	28–30	"About Damn Time"	—	—	—	✔
6	Scarlette Von B	26	"Blue Jeans"	—	—	—	—
7	Katie Coleman	28	"Natural Woman"	✔	—	—	—
8	Kelly Hastings	41	"Bird Set Free"	—	—	—	✔

=== Episode 5 (2 December) ===
- Coach performance: Olly Murs & will.i.am — "Troublemaker"

Order	Artist	Age	Song	Coaches and artists choices			
Order	Artist	Age	Song	will.i.am	Anne-Marie	Tom	Olly
1	Liam Price	34	"Stop!"	—	—	—	—
2	Jolie Stevens	19	"Clearly"	—	✔	—	—
3	Matt Green	34	"Not Take Me Back to London" (original song)	✔	✔	—	—
4	Keilah Rebekah	23	"You Say"	—	—	✔	✔
5	Jack Desmond	22	"A Thousand Miles"	—	—	—	✔
6	Jess Hayes	25	"The Dark End of the Street"	✔	✔	✔	✔
7	Bob Strachan	44	"Folsom Prison Blues"	—	—	—	—
8	Zaza	30	"Back to Life"	✔	—	—	—
9	Jazz Morley	33	"Landslide"	—	—	✔	✔

=== Episode 6 (9 December) ===
- Coach performance: Anne-Marie — "Psycho"

Order	Artist	Age	Song	Coaches and artists choices			
Order	Artist	Age	Song	will.i.am	Anne-Marie	Tom	Olly
1	Cleo Stewart	30	"Heaven"	✔	✔	✔	✔
2	Kim Palmer	30	"It Must Have Been Love"	—	—	—	—
3	Simon Simms	28	"Bibia Be Ye Ye"	—	✔	—	✔
4	The Skylarks	16 & 44	"Dancing in the Dark"	—	✔	—	—
5	Shannon Hurst	26	"The Joke"	—	—	—	—
6	Valntna	31	"I'm Going Down"	—	✔	—	✔
7	Brendan Sherk	24	"All For You"	—	—	✔	✔
8	Imisi Peletu	21	"Moon River"	—	—	—	✔
9	Shane Brierley	17	"Heal"	✔	—	—	Team full

=== Episode 7 (16 December) ===
Order	Artist	Age	Song	Coaches and artists choices			
Order	Artist	Age	Song	will.i.am	Anne-Marie	Tom	Olly
1	Adaeze	18	"When You Were Mine"	Team full	✔	✔	Team full
2	Rachel Burnett	19	"Unintended"	Team full	✔	Team full	Team full

== Callbacks ==
Guest mentors for series 12 of The Voice UK

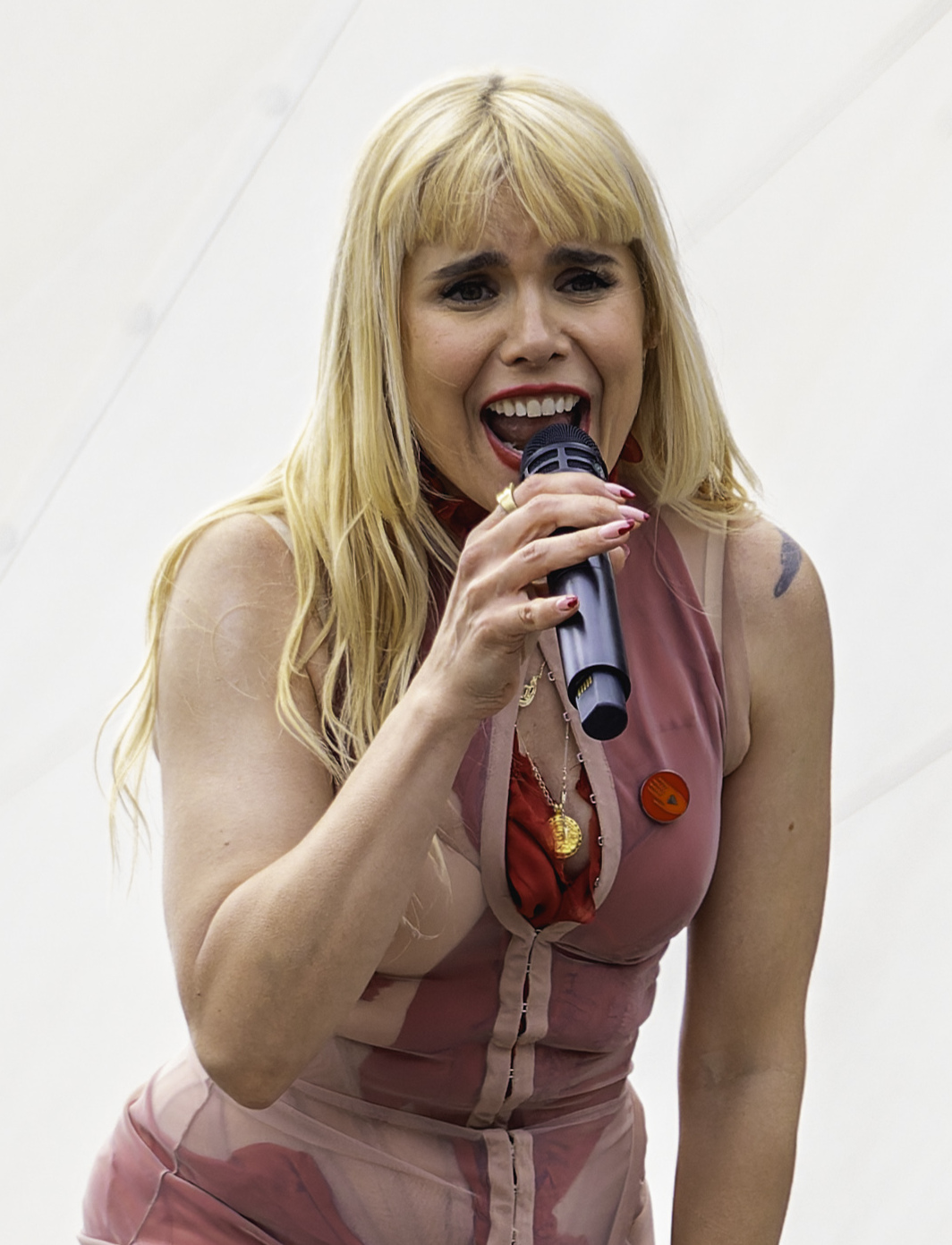
Paloma Faith
(Team Will)

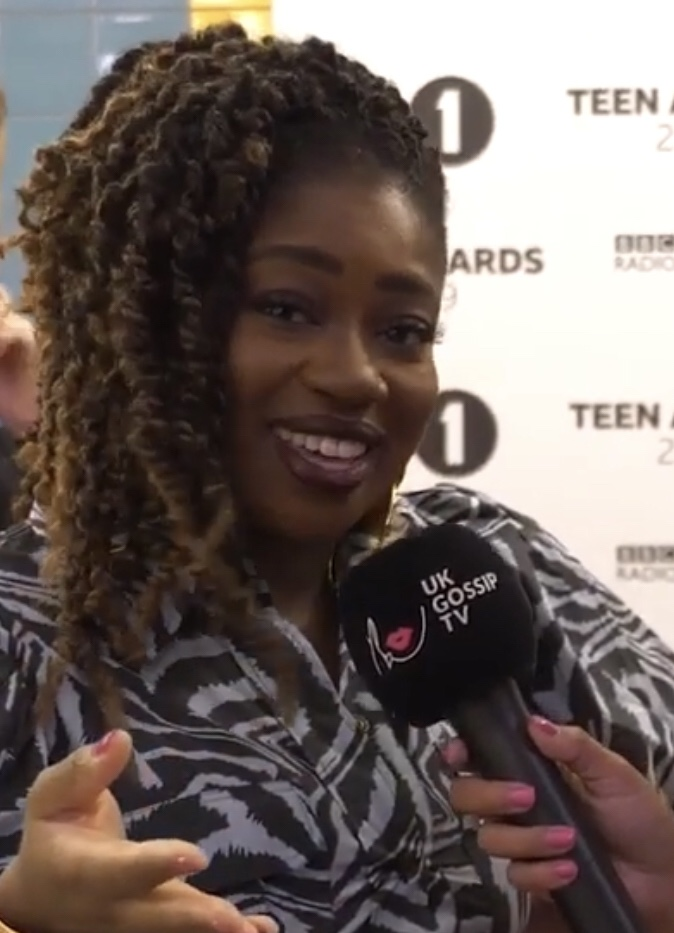
Clara Amfo
(Team Anne-Marie)

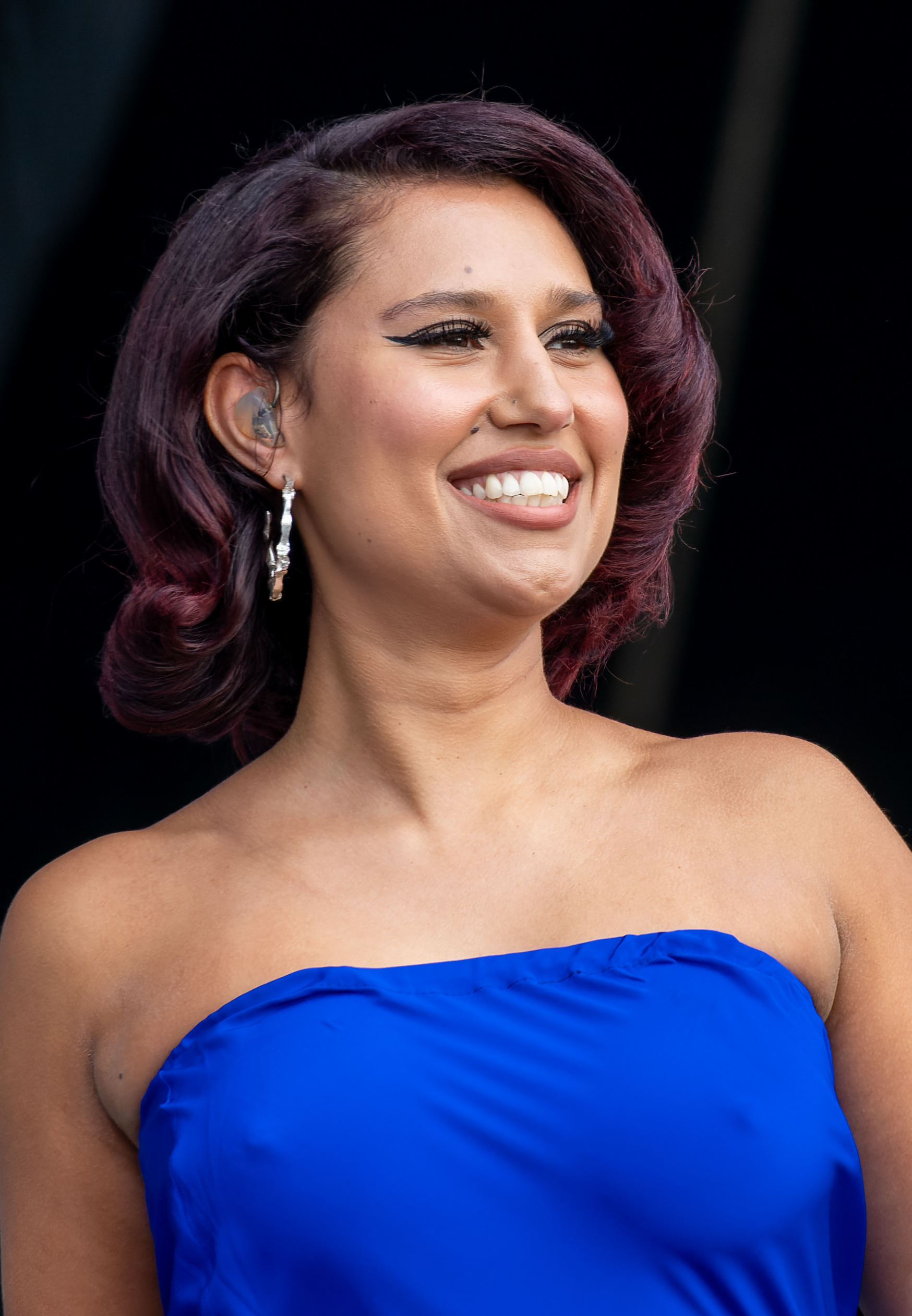
Raye
(Team Anne-Marie)

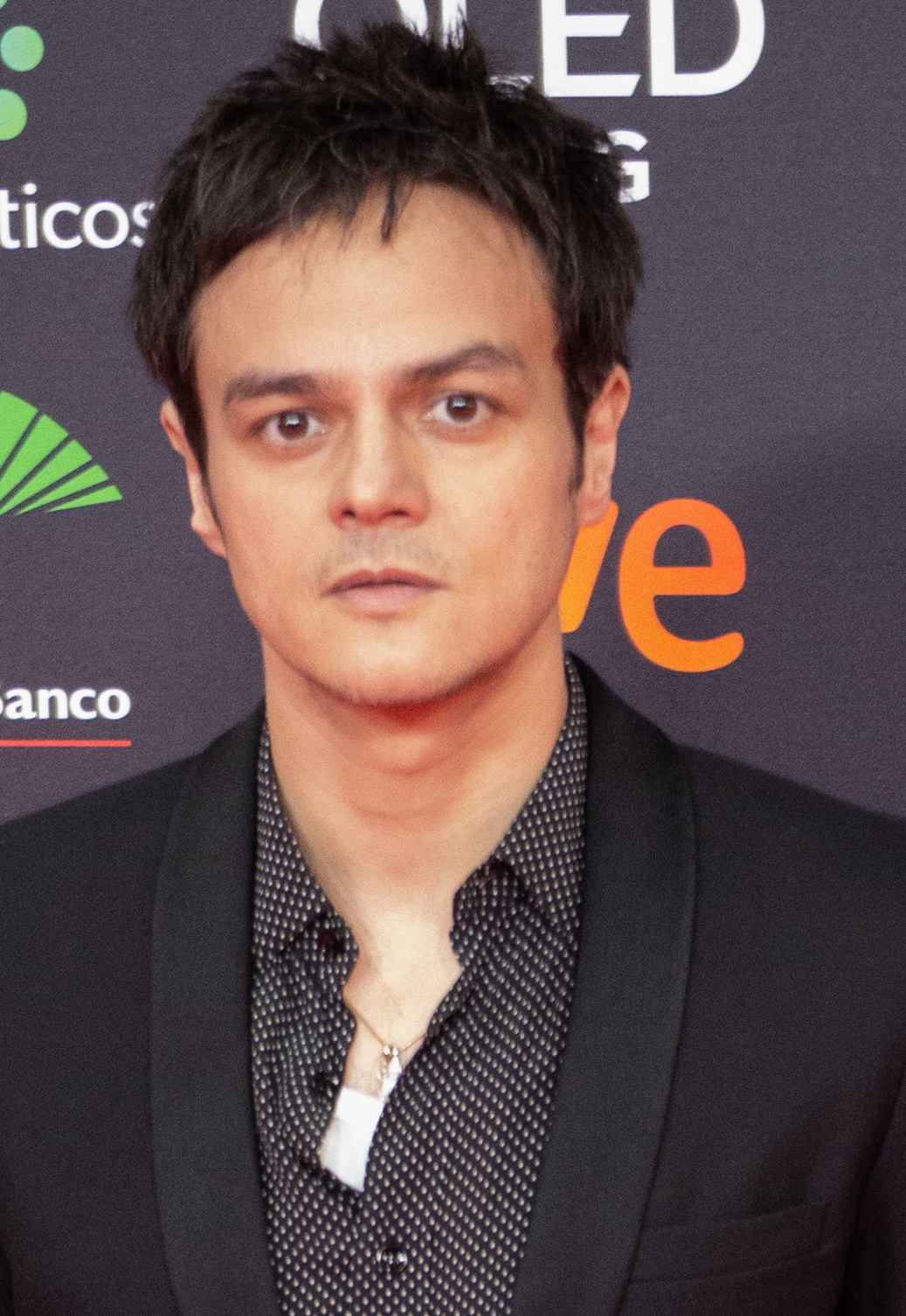
Jamie Cullum
(Team Tom)

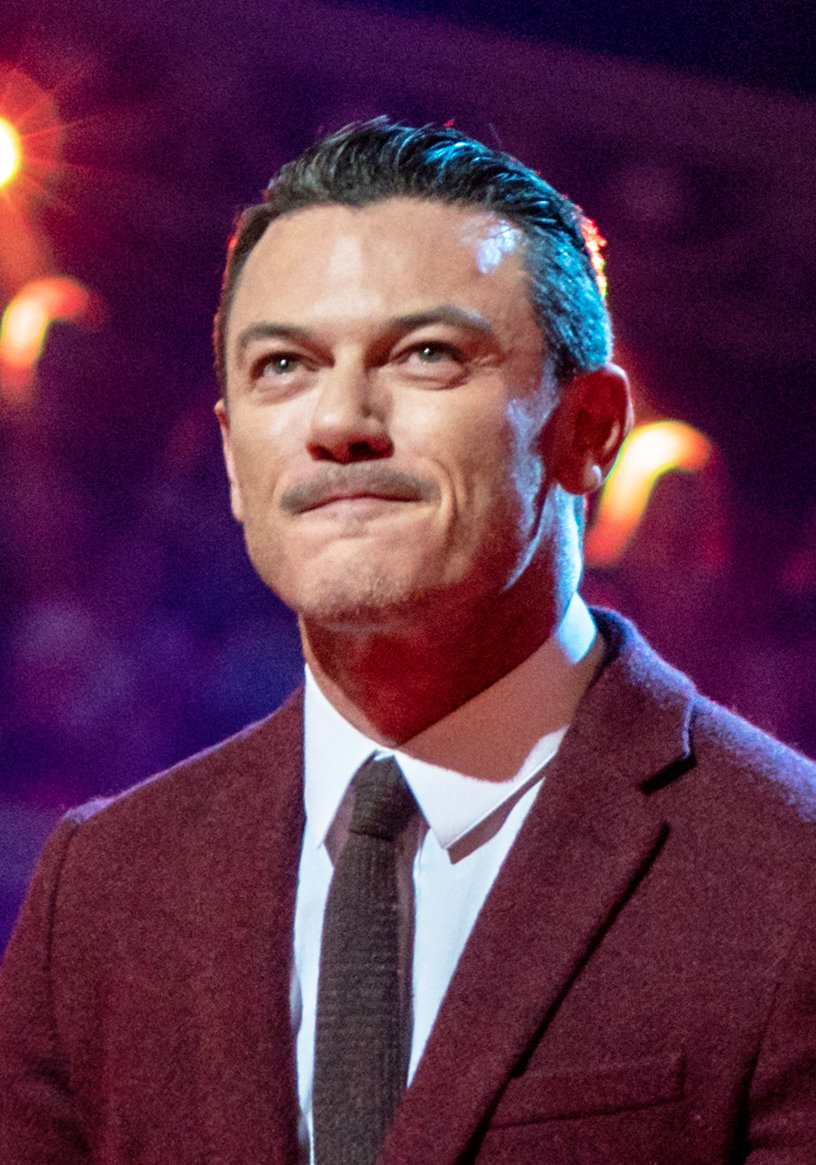
Luke Evans
(Team Olly)

For this season, the 'Callbacks' returned. This stage aired on 16 December, following the final round of blind auditions. In this round, each coach brought in a mentor for their team. Paloma Faith, Clara Amfo and Raye, Jamie Cullum, and Luke Evans were invited by will.i.am, Anne-Marie, Tom Jones, and Olly Murs, respectively. Cleo Stewart from Team Will withdrew from the competition prior to the Callbacks.

In the Callbacks, the coaches divided their 10 contestants selected in the blind auditions into three groups, where they were given the same song to sing in their own styles. After all artists of the same group finished their performances, the coaches had to choose one to advance to the semi-final. A total of three artists were taken through to the semi-final per coach.

The Callbacks colour key
Artist advanced to the semi-finals
Artist was eliminated

Callbacks Results
Episode	Order	Coach	Winner	Song	Losers
Episode 7 (16 December)	1	Olly Murs	Stan Urban	"Hound Dog"	Jess Hayes
Episode 7 (16 December)	1	Olly Murs	Stan Urban	"Hound Dog"	Simon Simms
Episode 7 (16 December)	1	Olly Murs	Stan Urban	"Hound Dog"	The Ashatones
Episode 7 (16 December)	2	Olly Murs	Kelly Hastings	"Ordinary World"	Marta Spizhenko
Episode 7 (16 December)	2	Olly Murs	Kelly Hastings	"Ordinary World"	Sheridan Coldstream
Episode 7 (16 December)	3	Olly Murs	Hope Winter	"Feels Like This"	Imisi Peletu
Episode 7 (16 December)	3	Olly Murs	Hope Winter	"Feels Like This"	Jack Desmond
Episode 7 (16 December)	4	will.i.am	Jen & Liv	"ABCDEFU"	Sese Foster
Episode 7 (16 December)	4	will.i.am	Jen & Liv	"ABCDEFU"	Shane Brierley
Episode 7 (16 December)	5	will.i.am	Katie Coleman	"She Blinded Me with Science"	Matt Green
Episode 7 (16 December)	5	will.i.am	THePETEBOX	"She Blinded Me with Science"	Matt Green
Episode 7 (16 December)	6	will.i.am	—N/a	"Ordinary People"	Hayley Chart
Episode 7 (16 December)	6	will.i.am	—N/a	"Ordinary People"	Laville
Episode 7 (16 December)	6	will.i.am	—N/a	"Ordinary People"	Zaza
Episode 7 (16 December)	7	Anne-Marie	—N/a	"Glimpse of Us"	Gwannty
Episode 7 (16 December)	7	Anne-Marie	—N/a	"Glimpse of Us"	Rachel Burnett
Episode 7 (16 December)	7	Anne-Marie	—N/a	"Glimpse of Us"	Valntna
Episode 7 (16 December)	8	Anne-Marie	Déjà Vu	"Lucky"	The Skylarks
Episode 7 (16 December)	8	Anne-Marie	Jolie Stevens	"Lucky"	The Skylarks
Episode 7 (16 December)	9	Anne-Marie	Nia Ekanem	"Virtual Insanity"	Chinchilla
Episode 7 (16 December)	9	Anne-Marie	Nia Ekanem	"Virtual Insanity"	Lil Shakz
Episode 7 (16 December)	9	Anne-Marie	Nia Ekanem	"Virtual Insanity"	Ryan Barton
Episode 7 (16 December)	10	Sir Tom Jones	Callum Doignie	"A House Is Not a Home"	Fatt Butcher
Episode 7 (16 December)	10	Sir Tom Jones	Callum Doignie	"A House Is Not a Home"	Jazz Morley
Episode 7 (16 December)	11	Sir Tom Jones	AV4C	"Angel of Mine"	Brendan Sherk
Episode 7 (16 December)	11	Sir Tom Jones	Bianca White	"Angel of Mine"	Keilah Rebekah
Episode 7 (16 December)	12	Sir Tom Jones	—N/a	"California Dreamin'"	Adaeze
Episode 7 (16 December)	12	Sir Tom Jones	—N/a	"California Dreamin'"	Daisy Gill
Episode 7 (16 December)	12	Sir Tom Jones	—N/a	"California Dreamin'"	Jerusha Frimpong

== Show details ==
=== Results summary ===
Colour key

- Team Will
- Team Anne-Marie
- Team Tom
- Team Olly

Result's colour key
Artist received the most public votes
Artist was eliminated

Weekly results
Contestant	Week 1	Week 2
Jen & Liv	Safe	Winner
Callum Doignie	Safe	Finalist
Hope Winter	Safe	Finalist
Jolie Stevens	Safe	Finalist
AV4C	Eliminated	Eliminated (Week 1)
Bianca White	Eliminated	Eliminated (Week 1)
Déjà Vu	Eliminated	Eliminated (Week 1)
Katie Coleman	Eliminated	Eliminated (Week 1)
Kelly Hastings	Eliminated	Eliminated (Week 1)
Nia Ekanem	Eliminated	Eliminated (Week 1)
Stan Urban	Eliminated	Eliminated (Week 1)
THePETEBOX	Eliminated	Eliminated (Week 1)

=== Week 1: Semi-final (23 December) ===
The Semi-final aired on 23 December 2023. The 12 contestants who advanced from the Callbacks competed, with each coach having to select one artist out of three to take through to the final.

Performances in the semi-final episode
Episode	Order	Coach	Artist	Song	Result
Episode 8 (23 December)	1	Sir Tom Jones	AV4C	"Stand Up"	Eliminated
Episode 8 (23 December)	2	Sir Tom Jones	Callum Doignie	"Control"	Saved
Episode 8 (23 December)	3	Sir Tom Jones	Bianca White	"Rescue"	Eliminated
Episode 8 (23 December)	4	Olly Murs	Stan Urban	"Johnny B. Goode"	Eliminated
Episode 8 (23 December)	5	Olly Murs	Kelly Hastings	"Impossible"	Eliminated
Episode 8 (23 December)	6	Olly Murs	Hope Winter	"Jealous Guy"	Saved
Episode 8 (23 December)	7	will.i.am	THePETEBOX	"Heat Waves"	Eliminated
Episode 8 (23 December)	8	will.i.am	Katie Coleman	"Firebabe"	Eliminated
Episode 8 (23 December)	9	will.i.am	Jen & Liv	"Sway"	Saved
Episode 8 (23 December)	10	Anne-Marie	Déjà Vu	"Beautiful Liar"	Eliminated
Episode 8 (23 December)	11	Anne-Marie	Jolie Stevens	"What Now"	Saved
Episode 8 (23 December)	12	Anne-Marie	Nia Ekanem	"Everybody Hurts"	Eliminated

=== Week 2: Final (30 December) ===
- Coach performance: "When Doves Cry"/"Kiss"
- Musical performance: Raye — "Oscar Winning Tears"; Anthonia Edwards — "All I Do Is Try"

The final aired on 30 December 2023. As in the previous series, the final was pre-recorded with the audience voting for the winner. For the first time in the show's history, there was only the winner reveal, with the remaining finalists placing as runners-up, instead of than fourth and third placements.

Performances in the final episode
Order	Coach	Artist	First song	Order	Duet (with Coach)	Result
1	Olly Murs	Hope Winter	"No Peace"	6	"I'll Be Waiting"	Finalist
2	Sir Tom Jones	Callum Doignie	"Breakaway"	7	"Bird on the Wire"	Finalist
3	Anne-Marie	Jolie Stevens	"Forever"	5	"Girls Just Want to Have Fun"	Finalist
4	will.i.am	Jen & Liv	"I'm Every Woman"	8	"Break My Soul"	Winners
