= The Voice UK series 11 =

The Voice UK
- Series 11
- Hosted by: Emma Willis
- Coaches: will.i.am; Anne-Marie; Sir Tom Jones; Olly Murs
- Winner: Anthonia Edwards
- Winning coach: Sir Tom Jones
- Runner-up: David Adeogun
- No. of episodes: 9

Release
- Original network: ITV; YouTube
- Original release: 3 September – 29 October 2022

Series chronology
- ← Previous; Series 10 Next → Series 12

The Voice UK is a British television music competition to find new singing talent. The eleventh series premiered on 3 September 2022 on ITV. will.i.am, Anne-Marie, Sir Tom Jones and Olly Murs returned as coaches, whilst Emma Willis returned as presenter.

On 29 October 2022, Anthonia Edwards was announced as the winner of the series, marking Tom Jones' third win as a coach and the second coach in any variation of the British version of The Voice to win more than two series, after Pixie Lott on the Kids' version. Edwards is also first artist to perform first in the Blind Auditions, and win the entire series. The final was pre-recorded.

== Coaches ==
Coaches for series 11 of The Voice UK

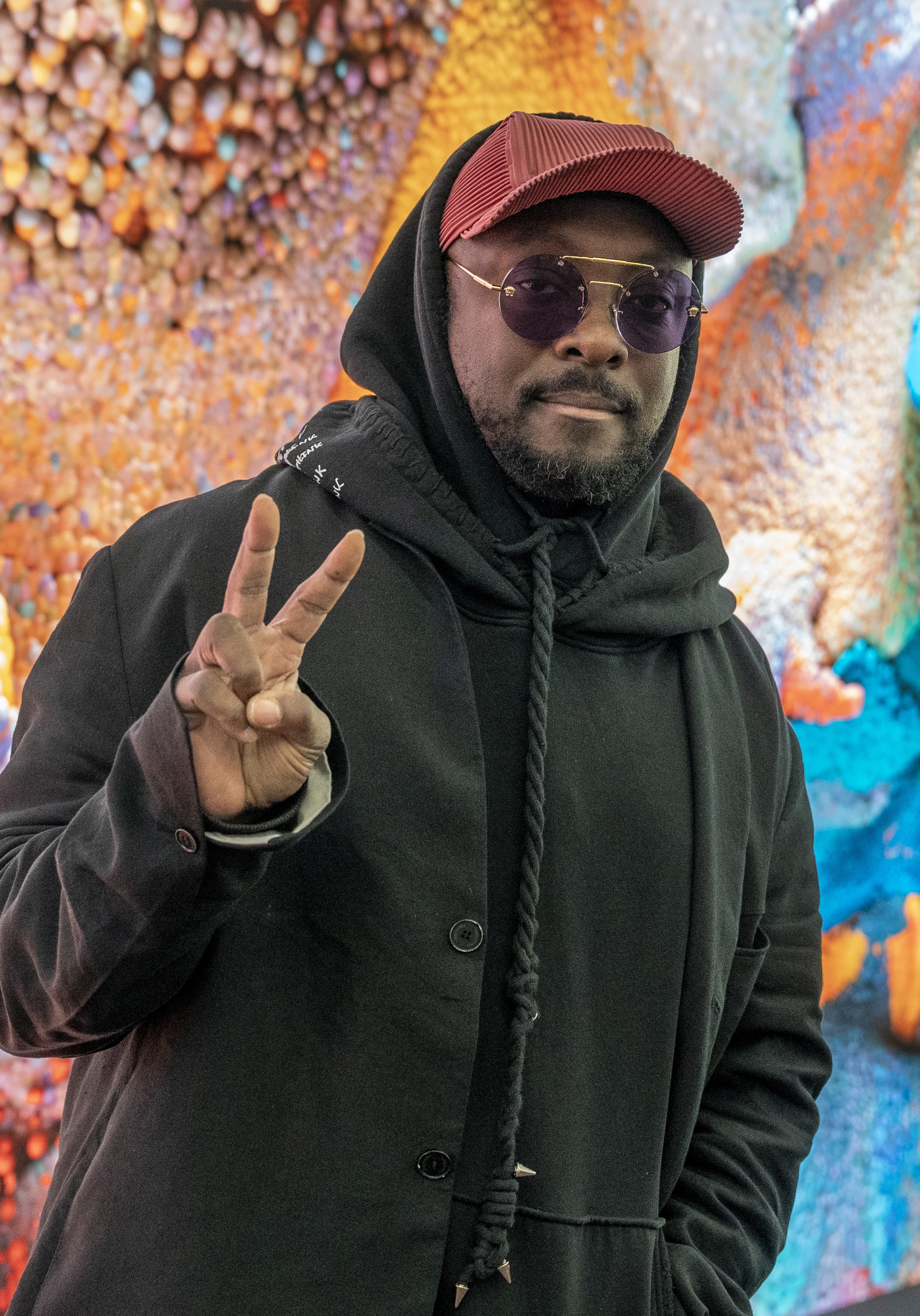
will.i.am

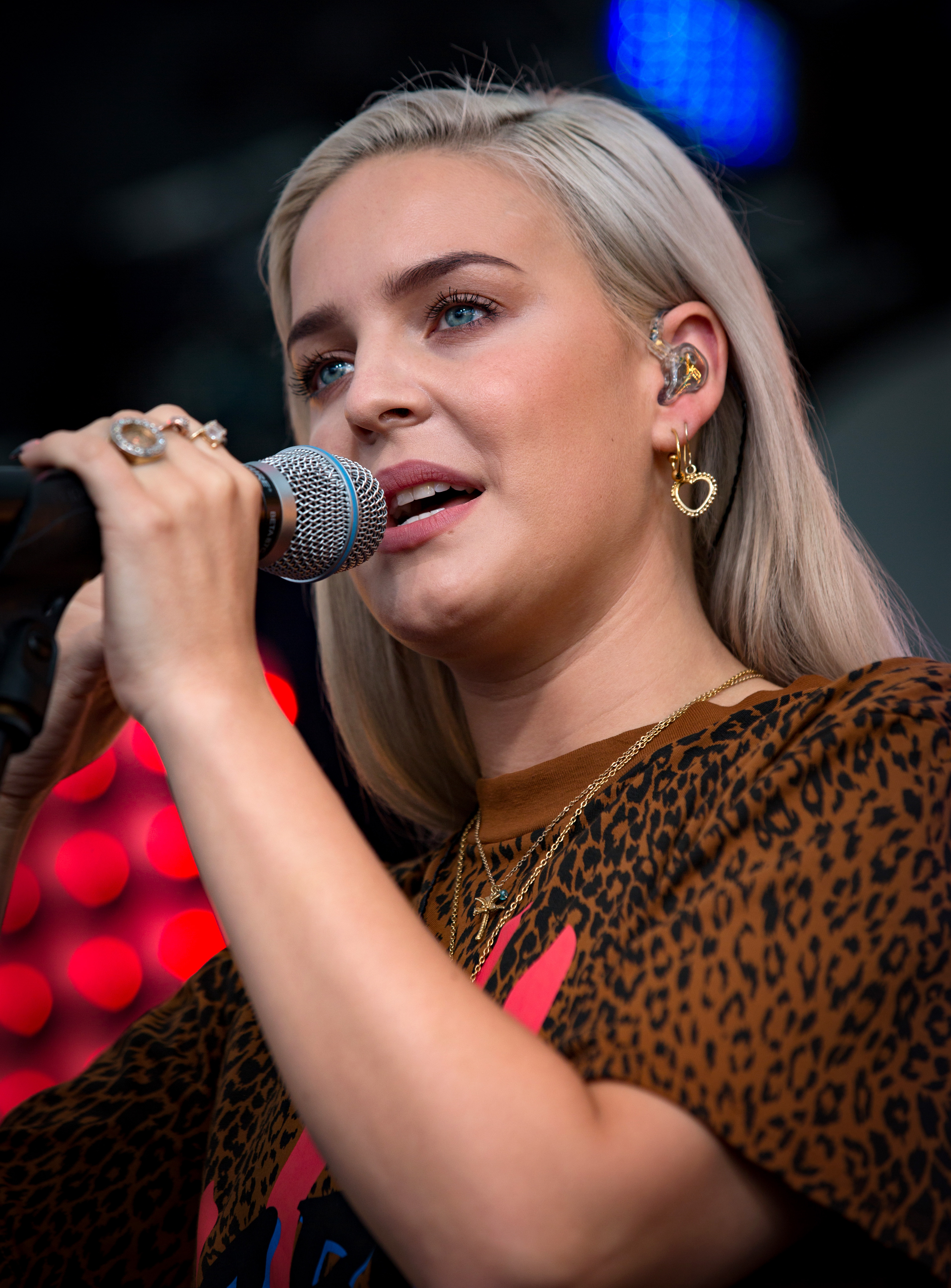
Anne-Marie

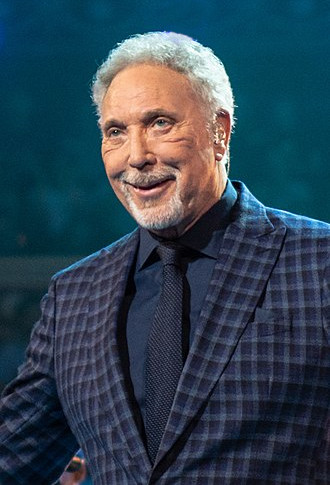
Sir Tom Jones

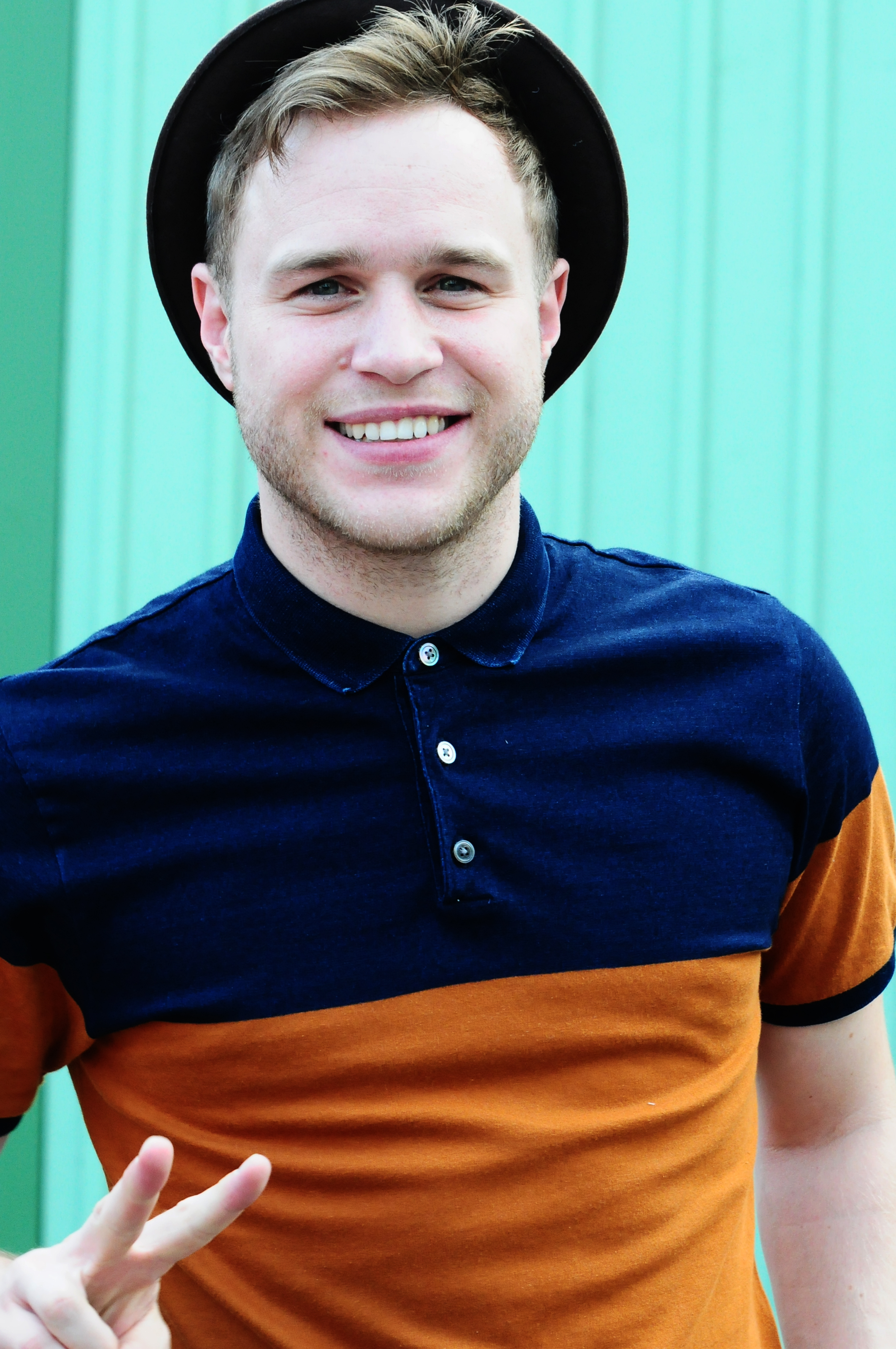
Olly Murs

In October 2021, it was confirmed that will.i.am, Anne-Marie, Sir Tom Jones and Olly Murs would return for their eleventh, second, tenth and fifth series as coaches, respectively, whilst it was announced that Emma Willis would return for her ninth series as presenter and that AJ Odudu would not return to present the show on the ITV Hub.

== Production ==
Auditions for the eleventh series opened in March 2021 and closed in July 2021. The series aired in the autumn for the first time in the show's history due to the cancellation of The X Factor in July 2021. It was also announced that the battle rounds had been axed and would be replaced by the "Callbacks" which aired on 15 October 2022 and the final will air on 29 October 2022.

The series began filming at Dock10 at MediaCityUK in Salford, Greater Manchester in October 2021. Also, the entire series was pre-recorded, including the grand final. The first trailer for the series premiered on 18 August 2022.

The blocked feature would be returning to the blind auditions, which allows for a coach to prevent another coach from getting an artist. Like last season, each coach will only receive one block.

== Teams ==
Colour key

- Winner
- Runner-up
- Third place
- Eliminated in the Semi-Final
- Eliminated in the Callbacks

Coach	Top 40 Artists				
will.i.am					
will.i.am	Naomi Johnson	Rain Castillo	Noèva	Eddy Pop	Rhianna Keane
will.i.am	Smokiecoco	Kira Mac	Cleo Clayton	Niamh Nolan	Hatice Tuzun
Anne-Marie					
Anne-Marie	Mark Howard	Kai Benjamin	Triniboi Joocie	Harrison James	Monroe
Anne-Marie	Hannah Rowe	Lucas Miles	Mila Lake	Olivia Mason	Ruby Joyce
Sir Tom Jones					
Sir Tom Jones	Anthonia Edwards	Rachel Modest	Jake Of Diamonds	Lee Jones	Clare Cordell
Sir Tom Jones	Rhys Christian	Thomas & Emilie	Francesca Fairclough	Tobi Kaye	Jamie Andrew
Olly Murs					
Olly Murs	David Adeogun	Marc Halls	Shaka	Benjamin Moss	Beatty Brothers
Olly Murs	Andres Cruz	Tom Hartley-Booth	Abela Brother	Olivia Mulqueeney	Rodwell Ndengeya

== Blind Auditions ==
Blind auditions colour key
✔	Coach pressed "I WANT YOU" button
	Artist defaulted to this coach's team
	Artist elected to join this coach's team
	Artist eliminated with no coach pressing his or her "I WANT YOU" button
	Artist Received an "All Turn"
✘	Coach pressed "I WANT YOU" button, but was "blocked" by another coach from getting the artist
	Blocked by will.i.am; Blocked by Anne-Marie; Blocked by Tom; Blocked by Olly

=== Episode 1 (3 September) ===
- Group performance: The Voice UK coaches – "Higher Love" (Whitney Houston cover)
- Coach performance: Sir Tom Jones - "I Won't Crumble with You If You Fall"

First episode results
Artist	Order	Age	Song	Coaches and artists choices			
Artist	Order	Age	Song	will.i.am	Anne-Marie	Tom	Olly
Anthonia Edwards	1	25	"Unconditionally"	✔	✔	✔	✔
Charlotte Riby	2	35	"Somebody Else's Guy"	–	–	–	–
Lucas Miles	3	19	"I Guess I'm in Love"	–	✔	–	–
David Adeogun	4	20	"In the Silence"	–	–	No ^{1}	✔
Thomas & Emilie	5	25 & 30	"Bring Him Home"	✔	✔	✔	No
Sandy Grigelis	6	27	"Good 4 U"	–	–	–	–
Cleo Clayton	7	23	"On My Mind"	✔	–	–	–
Mark Howard	8	27	"Anywhere Away from Here"	✔	✔	✔	✔

- ^1 Tom tried to block Olly, but was not possible, since Olly had already blocked him.

=== Episode 2 (10 September) ===
- Coach performance: Olly Murs - "Sweet Caroline" (Neil Diamond cover; dedicated to the audience who returned after the COVID-19 pandemic in England and to Murs's late X Factor co-host Caroline Flack who committed suicide in February 2020)

Second episode results
Artist	Order	Age	Song	Coaches and artists choices			
Artist	Order	Age	Song	will.i.am	Anne-Marie	Tom	Olly
Beatty Brothers	1	32 & 27	"You Are the Reason"	✔	–	✔	✔
Richard Hadfield	2	27	"I Who Have Nothing"	–	–	–	–
Harrison James	3	24	"2002"	✔	✔	✔	No
Shaka	4	27	"Good Luck"	–	–	–	✔
Lee Jones	5	50	"Hold My Girl"	–	–	✔	–
Tom Collins	6	24	"Dakota"	–	–	–	–
Rain Castillo	7	22	"Simmer"	✔	✔	✔	–
Rachel Modest	8	45	"For All We Know"	✔	✔	✔	✔

=== Episode 3 (17 September) ===
- Coach performance: Anne-Marie - "Our Song"

Third episode results
Artist	Order	Age	Song	Coaches and artists choices			
Artist	Order	Age	Song	will.i.am	Anne-Marie	Tom	Olly
Benjamin Moss	1	27	"Hallelujah I Love Her So"	–	–	–	✔
Kai Benjamin	2	18	"7 Rings"	✔	✔	✔	✔
Jordan Spencer	3	26	"A Million Dreams"	–	–	–	–
Noèva	4	31	"A Woman's Worth"	✔	–	✔	–
Marc Halls	5	35	"Drivers License"	–	–	✔	✔
Alicia Hooper	6	34	"All I Know So Far"	–	–	–	–
Eddy Pop	7	28	"Breakeven"	✔	–	✔	–
Clare Cordell	8	31	"Ain't No Way"	–	–	✔	✔

=== Episode 4 (24 September) ===
- Coach performance: Olly Murs - "Livin' On a Prayer" (Bon Jovi cover; audience sing-a-long)/"Feeling Good" (Michael Bublé cover)

Fourth episode results
Artist	Order	Age	Song	Coaches and artists choices			
Artist	Order	Age	Song	will.i.am	Anne-Marie	Tom	Olly
Andres Cruz	1	24	"Don't Go Yet"	–	–	✔	✔
Jordan Brook	2	26	"Amazed"	–	–	–	–
Rhys Christian	3	30	"So Sick"	–	–	✔	–
Monroe	4	30-36	"What's Up?"	✔	✔	✔	No
Mandeep Singh	5	26	"Touch the Sky"	–	–	–	–
Rhianna Keane	6	22	"Leave the Door Open"	✔	–	–	–
Aaron Bolton	7	35	"Teenage Dirtbag"	–	–	–	–
Hannah Rowe	8	19	"Don't Leave Me Lonely"	–	✔	–	–
Jake of Diamonds	9	28	"Words" (original song)	–	–	✔	✔

=== Episode 5 (1 October) ===
Fifth episode results
Artist	Order	Age	Song	Coaches and artists choices			
Artist	Order	Age	Song	will.i.am	Anne-Marie	Tom	Olly
Triniboi Joocie	1	32	"Bottle Over Head"	–	✔	–	✔
Aaron Garrett	2	36	"This Old Heart of Mine"	–	–	–	–
Francesca Fairclough	3	27	"Everybody's Changing"	–	–	✔	✔
Smokiecoco	4	21 & 24	"These Words"	✔	–	–	–
Amanda Lepusinka	5	29	"Castles"	–	–	–	–
Mila Lake	6	16	"You Can't Stop the Girl"	–	✔	✔	✔
Anthony Hughes	7	29	"Butter"	–	–	–	–
Tom Hartley-Booth	8	33	"God Only Knows"	–	–	–	✔
Kira Mac	9	26	"Nothing Else Matters"	✔	–	–	–

=== Episode 6 (8 October) ===
Sixth episode results
Artist	Order	Age	Song	Coaches and artists choices			
Artist	Order	Age	Song	will.i.am	Anne-Marie	Tom	Olly
Tobi Kaye	1	34	"I'm Getting Ready"	–	✔	✔	–
Helen Leahey	2	34	"Where the Wild Roses Grow"	–	–	–	–
Abela Brother	3	26	"Beggin'"	✔	–	–	✔
Olivia Mason	4	21	"Killing Me Softly"	✔	✔	✔	✔
Naomi Johnson	5	26	"Emotions"	✔	–	–	–
Steven Hastings	6	30	"Learn to Fly"	–	–	–	–
Ruby Joyce	7	18	"Linger"	–	✔	–	–
Olivia Mulqueeney	8	16	"Good Without"	–	Team full	–	✔
Niamh Nolan	9	25	"Shallow"	✔	Team full	✔	–

=== Episode 7 (15 October) ===
Seventh episode results
Artist	Order	Age	Song	Coaches and artists choices			
Artist	Order	Age	Song	will.i.am	Anne-Marie	Tom	Olly
Rodwell Ndengeya	1	23	"The Blower's Daughter"	–	Team full	–	✔
Hatice Tuzun	2	24	"Flowers"	✔	Team full	✔	Team full
Jamie Andrew	3	31	"Dangerous Woman"	Team full	Team full	✔	Team full

== Callbacks ==
Guest mentors for series 11 of The Voice UK

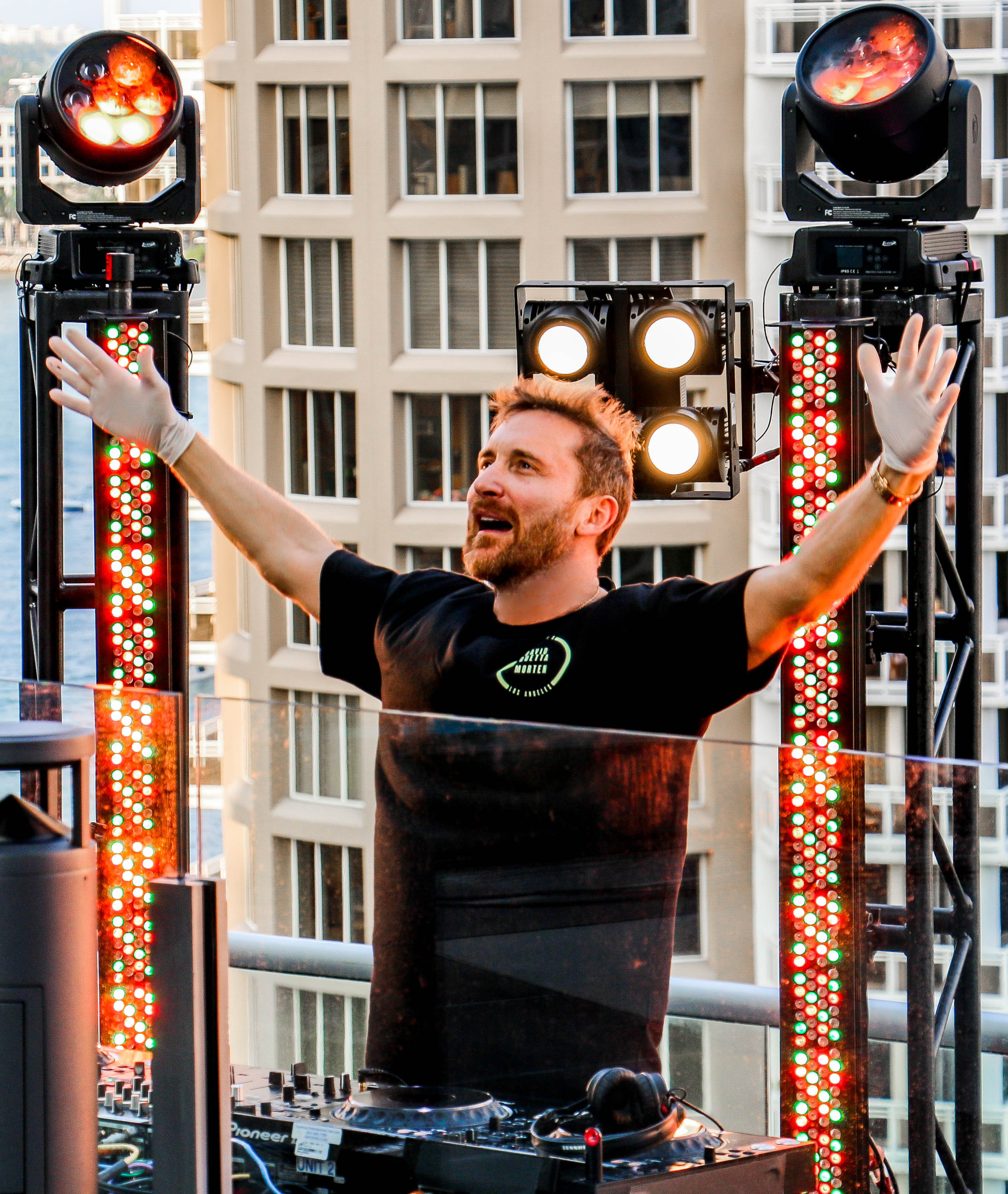
David Guetta for Team Will

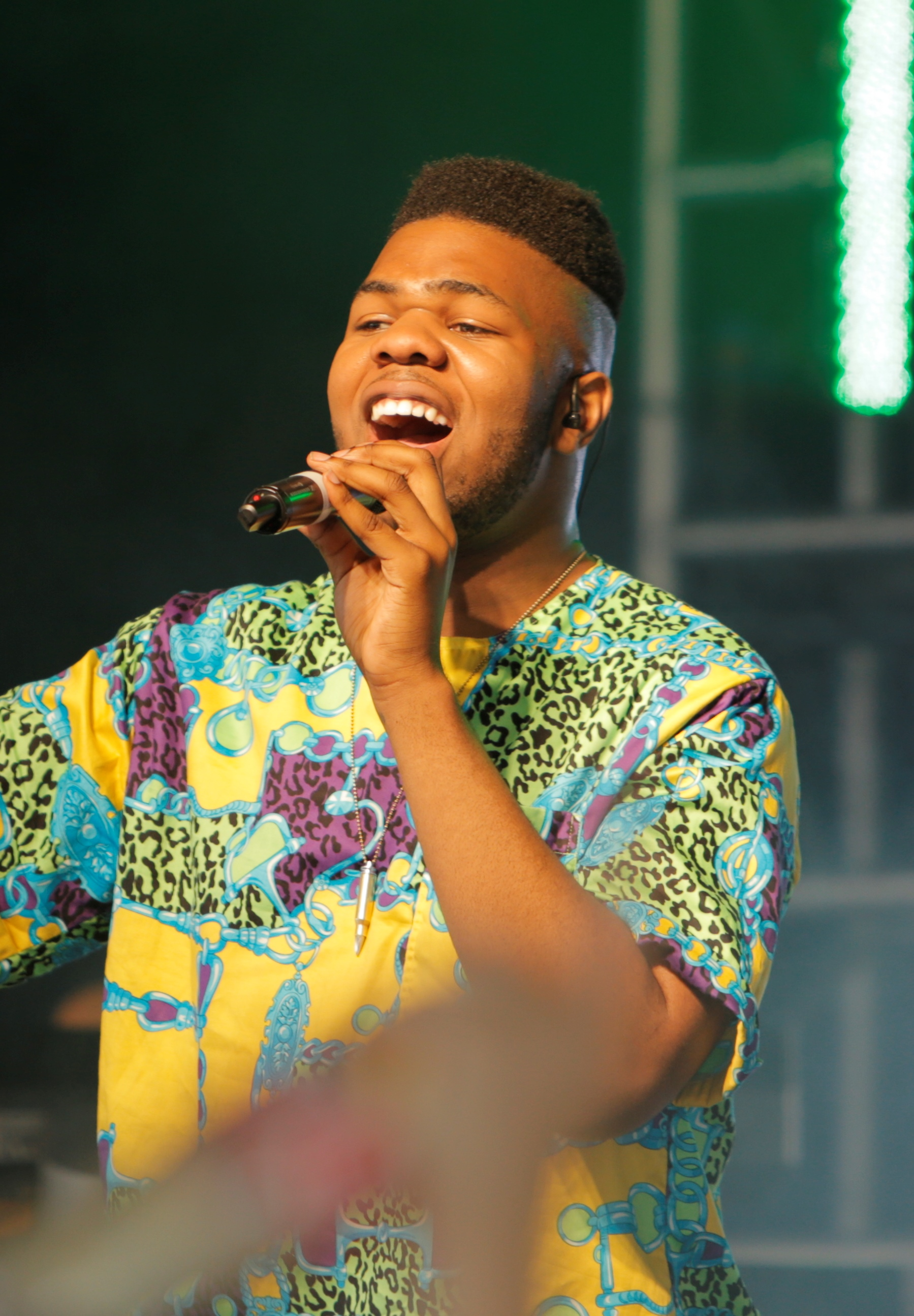
MNEK for Team Anne-Marie

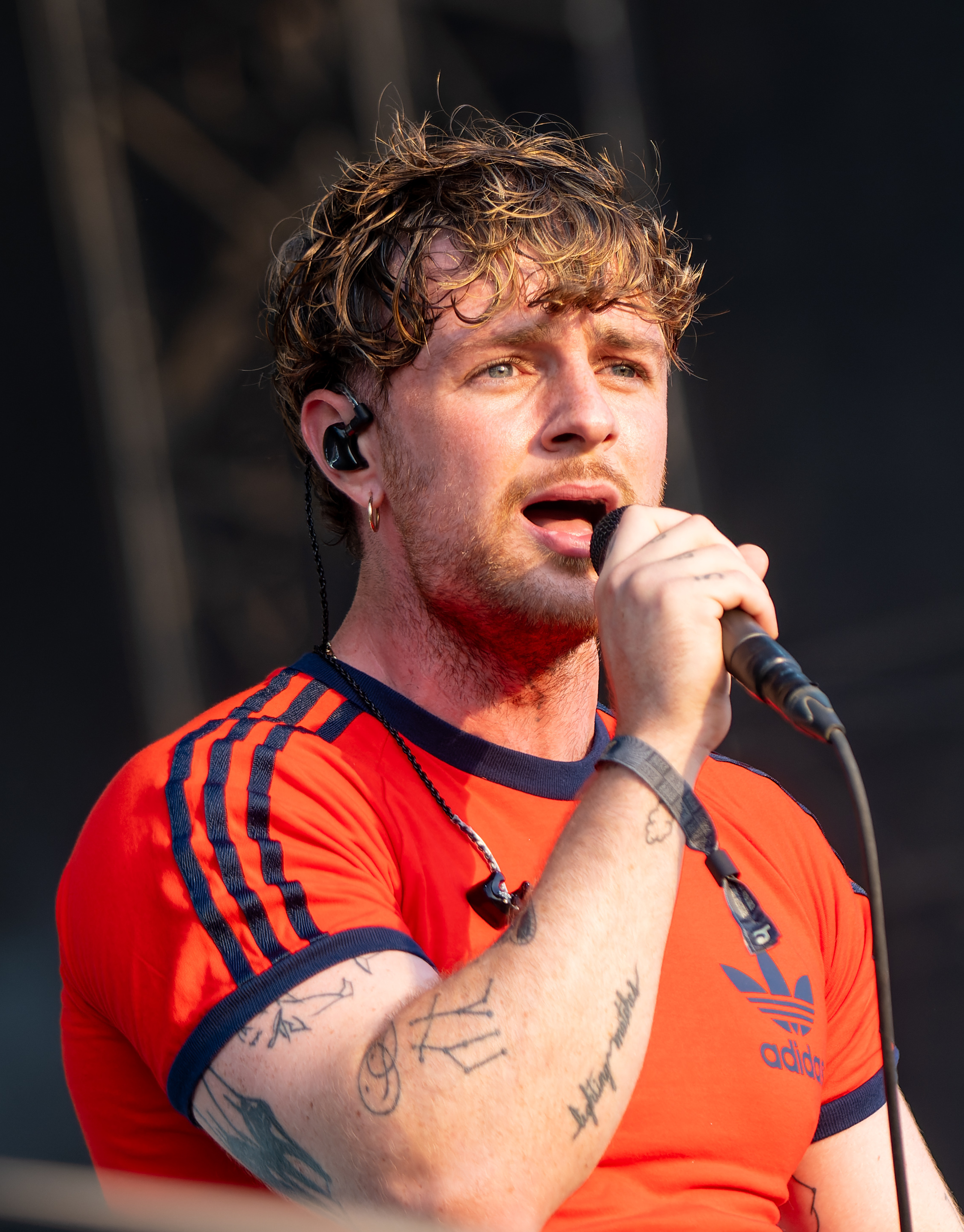
Tom Grennan for Team Tom

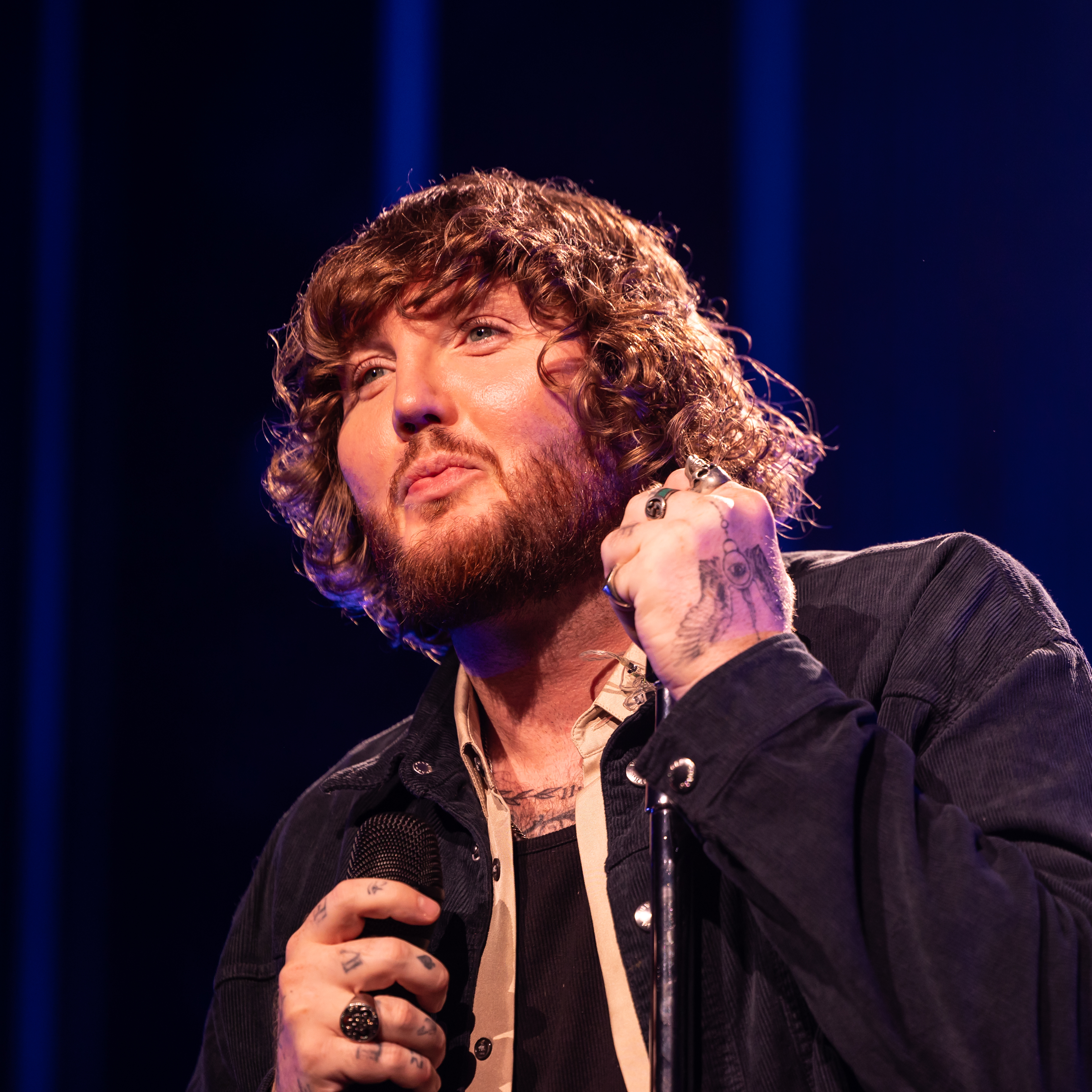
James Arthur for Team Olly

For this season of the Voice, the show replaced the usual 'Battles' round with 'The Callbacks', which is a twist to the show first adopted by the tenth season of The Voice Australia. The Callbacks aired on 15 October. In this round, each coach brought in a mentor for their team. David Guetta, MNEK, Tom Grennan, and James Arthur were invited by will.i.am, Anne-Marie, Tom Jones, and Olly Murs, respectively.

In the Callbacks, the coaches divided their 10 contestants selected in the Blind Auditions into three groups where they were given the same song to sing in their own styles. After all three or four artists of the same group finished their performances, the coaches will have to choose one to advance to the semi-final. A total of three artists were taken through to the semi-final per coach.

The Callbacks colour key
Artist advanced to the Semi-Finals
Artist was eliminated

Callbacks Results
Episode	Order	Coach	Winner	Song	Losers
Episode 7 (15 October)	1	will.i.am	Noèva	"Without You"	Cleo Clayton
Episode 7 (15 October)	1	will.i.am	Noèva	"Without You"	Rhianna Keane
Episode 7 (15 October)	1	will.i.am	Noèva	"Without You"	Eddy Pop
Episode 7 (15 October)	2	will.i.am	Rain Castillo	"Decline"	Smokiecoco
Episode 7 (15 October)	2	will.i.am	Rain Castillo	"Decline"	Hatice Tuzun
Episode 7 (15 October)	3	will.i.am	Naomi Johnson	"Black Hole"	Kira Mac
Episode 7 (15 October)	3	will.i.am	Naomi Johnson	"Black Hole"	Niamh Nolan
Episode 7 (15 October)	4	Olly Murs	Shaka	"Every Little Step"	Andres Cruz
Episode 7 (15 October)	4	Olly Murs	Shaka	"Every Little Step"	Benjamin Moss
Episode 7 (15 October)	5	Olly Murs	Marc Halls	"Total Eclipse Of The Heart"	Tom Hartley-Booth
Episode 7 (15 October)	5	Olly Murs	Marc Halls	"Total Eclipse Of The Heart"	Abela Brother
Episode 7 (15 October)	6	Olly Murs	David Adeogun	"Sandcastles"	Beatty Brothers
Episode 7 (15 October)	6	Olly Murs	David Adeogun	"Sandcastles"	Olivia Mulqueeney
Episode 7 (15 October)	6	Olly Murs	David Adeogun	"Sandcastles"	Rodwell Ndengeya
Episode 7 (15 October)	7	Anne-Marie	Triniboi Joocie	"I Don't Care"	Harrison James
Episode 7 (15 October)	7	Anne-Marie	Triniboi Joocie	"I Don't Care"	Ruby Joyce
Episode 7 (15 October)	8	Anne-Marie	Mark Howard	"Better Off Without You"	Mila Lake
Episode 7 (15 October)	8	Anne-Marie	Mark Howard	"Better Off Without You"	Lucas Miles
Episode 7 (15 October)	8	Anne-Marie	Mark Howard	"Better Off Without You"	Hannah Rowe
Episode 7 (15 October)	9	Anne-Marie	Kai Benjamin	"Waterfalls"	Olivia Mason
Episode 7 (15 October)	9	Anne-Marie	Kai Benjamin	"Waterfalls"	Monroe
Episode 7 (15 October)	10	Tom Jones	Anthonia Edwards	"Pride (In The Name Of Love)"	Lee Jones
Episode 7 (15 October)	10	Tom Jones	Anthonia Edwards	"Pride (In The Name Of Love)"	Tobi Kaye
Episode 7 (15 October)	11	Tom Jones	Jake Of Diamonds	"Fields Of Gold"	Jamie Andrew
Episode 7 (15 October)	11	Tom Jones	Jake Of Diamonds	"Fields Of Gold"	Francesca Fairclough
Episode 7 (15 October)	11	Tom Jones	Jake Of Diamonds	"Fields Of Gold"	Thomas & Emilie
Episode 7 (15 October)	12	Tom Jones	Rachel Modest	"Border Song"	Rhys Christian
Episode 7 (15 October)	12	Tom Jones	Rachel Modest	"Border Song"	Clare Cordell

== Show details ==
=== Results summary ===
Colour key

- Team Will
- Team Anne-Marie
- Team Tom
- Team Olly

Result's colour key

- Artist received the most public votes
- Artist was eliminated

Weekly Results
Contestant	Week 1	Week 2	
Contestant	Week 1	Round 1	Round 2
Anthonia Edwards	Safe	Safe	Winner
David Adeogun	Safe	Safe	Runner-up
Mark Howard	Safe	Eliminated	Eliminated (Week 2)
Naomi Johnson	Safe	Eliminated	Eliminated (Week 2)
Jake of Diamonds	Eliminated	Eliminated (Week 1)	
Kai Benjamin	Eliminated	Eliminated (Week 1)	
Marc Halls	Eliminated	Eliminated (Week 1)	
Noèva	Eliminated	Eliminated (Week 1)	
Rachel Modest	Eliminated	Eliminated (Week 1)	
Rain Castillo	Eliminated	Eliminated (Week 1)	
Shaka	Eliminated	Eliminated (Week 1)	
Triniboi Joocie	Eliminated	Eliminated (Week 1)	

=== Week 1: Semi-final (22 October) ===
The Semi-final aired on 22 October 2022. The 12 contestants that had advanced from the Callbacks competed for their spots in the Finale of this season. Each coach will have to choose one artist out of three to take through to the Final. This episode was pre-recorded.

Semi-final Results
Episode	Order	Coach	Artist	Song	Result
Episode 8 (22 October)	1	Olly Murs	David Adeogun	"Easy on Me"	Saved
Episode 8 (22 October)	2	Olly Murs	Shaka	"Take My Breath"	Eliminated
Episode 8 (22 October)	3	Olly Murs	Marc Halls	"Chandelier"	Eliminated
Episode 8 (22 October)	4	Anne-Marie	Triniboi Joocie	"Obeyah" (Original Song)	Eliminated
Episode 8 (22 October)	5	Anne-Marie	Mark Howard	"Half a Man"	Saved
Episode 8 (22 October)	6	Anne-Marie	Kai Benjamin	"Feel Good Inc."	Eliminated
Episode 8 (22 October)	7	will.i.am	Rain Castillo	"Sorry"	Eliminated
Episode 8 (22 October)	8	will.i.am	Noèva	"The Scientist"	Eliminated
Episode 8 (22 October)	9	will.i.am	Naomi Johnson	"Bang Bang"	Saved
Episode 8 (22 October)	10	Tom Jones	Rachel Modest	"Anytime You Need a Friend"	Eliminated
Episode 8 (22 October)	11	Tom Jones	Jake Of Diamonds	"Human"	Eliminated
Episode 8 (22 October)	12	Tom Jones	Anthonia Edwards	"Praying"	Saved

=== Week 2: The Final (29 October) ===
The Final aired on 29 October 2022. Same as all the other episodes this season, the Final is also pre-recorded, with the audience and a virtual audience via Zoom voting for the final two and the winner.

- Group performance: The Voice UK coaches – "Shine" (Emeli Sandé)
- Musical guest: Craig Eddie ("The Outside")

Performances & Results
Order	Coach	Artist	First song	Order	Duet (with Coach)	Order	Winners single	Result
1	Anne-Marie	Mark Howard	"One Last Time"	5	"Viva Forever"	N/A (already eliminated)		Third place
2	Olly Murs	David Adeogun	"You'll Never Walk Alone"	7	"Don't Let the Sun Go Down on Me"	9	"Diamonds"	Runner-up
3	will.i.am	Naomi Johnson	"Fighter"	6	"Crazy in Love"	N/A (already eliminated)		Third place
4	Tom Jones	Anthonia Edwards	"When the Party's Over"	8	"It's a Man's Man's Man's World"	10	"Anyone"	Winner
