= PCD Forever Tour =

2026 concert tour by the Pussycat Dolls

- Intercontinental tour by the Pussycat Dolls
- Promotional poster
- Location: Europe; North America; South America
- Start date: June 6, 2026
- End date: June 6, 2027
- No. of shows: 25
- Supporting acts: Deja Vu; Lil' Kim; Léa Doffey; Pabllo Vittar

the Pussycat Dolls concert chronology
- Doll Domination Tour (2009); PCD Forever Tour (2026)

The PCD Forever Tour was the third concert tour by American girl group the Pussycat Dolls, featuring Nicole Scherzinger, Ashley Roberts, and Kimberly Wyatt. It began in West Hollywood, California, United States, on June 6, 2026, and concluded in Sao Paulo, Brazil, on October 31, 2026. The tour encompassed 23 shows. It was announced following a resolution of a legal dispute in which the group's founder Robin Antin sued Scherzinger over profit splits and creative control before they reached a confidential settlement in 2025, after a previously planned 2020 reunion tour was canceled. In May 2026, one month ahead of the scheduled start, 33 North American tour dates were cancelled, citing poor ticket sales. The European leg of the tour is scheduled to continue as planned, supported by Deja Vu and Lil Kim as supporting acts.

== Background ==
In November 2025, the Pussycat Dolls founder Robin Antin and lead singer Nicole Scherzinger quietly ended their legal dispute with a confidential settlement which was in part responsible for the cancelation of the group's previous 2019 concert tour, along with the COVID-19 pandemic. Later that month, media reports indicated the group were exploring a new tour, with Kimberly Wyatt confirming they had put past conflicts behind them. In December 2025, Scherzinger further teased a reunion in an Instagram post celebrating the "Buttons" video reaching 1 billion YouTube views, writing, "For the PCD fans. For the memories. For what’s to come." By February 2026, outlets reported that the planned reunion would only feature Ashley Roberts, Scherzinger, and Wyatt, with a world tour in development.

On March 9, the group cleared their official social media accounts, posted a 2026 version of their logo, and launched a new website. Venues worldwide started posting pink-text Instagram teasers: "We guarantee our next concert announcement will Stickwitu" and "Don't Cha wish you knew who we were announcing tomorrow"—referencing their songs, hinting at a reunion tour. This coincided with the announcement of Roberts' participation in the all-star edition of I'm a Celebrity...South Africa. Roberts, Scherzinger, and Wyatt announced their reunion on March 12, 2026, released the new single "Club Song" and simultaneously revealed the PCD Forever Tour. Live Nation served as the tour's promoter. Scherzinger instigated the reunion by contacting Roberts and Wyatt, concluding they had a similar outlook and were comfortable with where they are in their lives now. Meanwhile, Carmit Bachar and Jessica Sutta confirmed they were not invited to the reunion and learned of it publicly. While Bachar has stated that she is uncertain why she was not included in the reunion, Sutta has claimed that her outspoken support for Robert F. Kennedy Jr. and her identification with the MAGA movement, led the group to view her as a "liability." She added that she viewed the reunion as a "cash grab." They announced 53 global shows from June to October 2026, beginning in Palm Desert, California, and ending in London, England. The opening acts were Lil' Kim and Mya, with Lil' Kim continuing on to Europe.

== Development ==
The Pussycat Dolls performing in Birmingham in September 2026

Ticket sales for the PCD Forever Tour ran through staggered presales and a general on‑sale in March 2026 via Live Nation and Ticketmaster. In North America, an artist presale took place on 18 March, a Citi card member presale on 18–19 March, and a general on‑sale on 20 March. In Europe and the UK, an artist presale began on 18 March ahead of a shared general on‑sale on 20 March, with a dedicated Mastercard presale from 18 to 20 March in France, Belgium, Norway, Denmark, the Netherlands and Poland. Standard tickets were sold alongside VIP packages such as Buttons Behind The Scenes Experience, Doll Domination Experience and Stickwitu VIP.

In April 2026, News.com.au reported that ticket sales for the tour were “alarmingly low” just weeks before the planned June 2026 kickoff, with Ticketmaster screenshots showing large numbers of unsold seats across major US markets. Some commentators suggested that touring featuring only half of the original lineup was always going to be a hard sell, and fans speculated weak demand could force smaller venues or cancellations, with some arguing a festival set would have been a safer comeback. Subsequently, on May 4, the group announced that all but one of the North American dates—the West Hollywood Pride Festival headlining set—had been canceled. In writing for BBC News, Steve McIntosh reported that tour dates in the US and Canada were cancelled due to low sales, citing the group's social media statement which referenced "an honest look" at the North American section. McIntosh opined that high ticket prices and focusing on large arenas was to blame. Tour manager Misty Roberts told Pollstar that the cancellation resulted in lost vendor deposits and left the team seeking alternative work for crew members. The North American leg had been expected to use ten semi-trucks and five tour buses. In August 2026, a São Paulo date was announced for October.

== Critical reception ==
The tour received positive reviews from critics. Most of them enjoyed the nostalgia effect brought by the band after many years away from the stage. John Brown from Scottishmusicnetwork.co.uk declared, "They might have been away from the live circuit for a while, but there was little evidence of rustiness. The preparation was obvious, the timing was sharp and the three women looked entirely at home commanding an arena," adding that "it was a full-scale pop spectacular, with choreography, costume changes and theatrical flourishes taking centre stage." Callum Wells from Attitude.co.uk complimented the band's performance, saying "Nicole Scherzinger, Ashley Roberts and Kimberly Wyatt reminded us exactly why we’ve spent nearly two decades waiting for their comeback."

Critics also appreciated the fact that each band member gets a solo section to shine on their own, but highlighted the fact that Scherzinger's section was "predictably, [...] the longest of these." Performances of both Wyatt and Roberts were well received as Ben Jolley from Contactmusic.com stated, "Wyatt got behind the decks to drop dopamine-inducing throwbacks, before Roberts really let her voice shine." Many critics agreed on the fact that Scherzinger is the one who shines the most with Dianne Bourne from LancsLive commenting that "Nicole is undeniably the driving force behind it all, delivering each note with extraordinary power." Alim Kheraj from The Guardian gave the show three stars out of five, calling the solo sections "uneven, with Roberts and Wyatt struggling against Scherzinger’s imperious star power."

== Set list ==
This set list is from the September 9, 2026, concert in Copenhagen.

Full group

1. "When I Grow Up"
2. "Beep" (contains elements of "Hot in Herre")
3. "Whatcha Think About That"
4. "Bottle Pop" (Magic & Watchamacallit remix; contains elements of "Run the World (Girls)")
5. "I Don't Need a Man"
6. "Wait a Minute"
7. "I Hate This Part"
8. "Jai Ho! (You Are My Destiny)"

Kimberly Wyatt solo

9. "Glaciers" (Her Majesty & the Wolves song)
10. "Walking on the Sun" (Her Majesty & the Wolves song)
11. "Candy"
12. "I Love It" (DJ set)

Ashley Roberts solo

13. "Fighter" (dance number)
14. "Woman Up"
15. "Break My Soul" / "Break Free" (dance number)

Nicole Scherzinger solo

16. "As If We Never Said Goodbye"
17. "Whatever U Like"
18. "Right There"
19. "Don't Hold Your Breath"
20. "Baby Love" (only in Brazil)
21. "Wet" / "Poison"

Full group

22. "Buttons" (contains elements of "Sports Car")
23. "Stickwitu"
24. "Hush Hush; Hush Hush"
25. "Club Song" (contains elements of "Scream & Shout")
26. "React"
27. "Don't Cha"

== Tour dates ==
List of 2026 concerts
Date (2026)	City	Country	Venue	Supporting acts
June 6 (Note: The June 6, 2026, concert was a part of WeHo Pride Festival.)	West Hollywood	United States	West Hollywood Park	—N/a
September 9	Copenhagen	Denmark	Royal Arena	Deja Vu; Lil' Kim
September 10	Oslo	Norway	Oslo Spektrum	Deja Vu; Lil' Kim
September 13	Esch-sur-Alzette	Luxembourg	Rockhal	Deja Vu; Lil' Kim
September 14	Munich	Germany	Olympiahalle	Deja Vu; Lil' Kim
September 16	Warsaw	Poland	Arena COS Torwar	Deja Vu; Lil' Kim
September 18	Antwerp	Belgium	AFAS Dome	Deja Vu; Lil' Kim
September 19	Paris	France	Accor Arena	Léa Doffey; Deja Vu; Lil' Kim
September 21	Zürich	Switzerland	Hallenstadion	Deja Vu; Lil' Kim
September 23	Prague	Czech Republic	O2 Arena	Deja Vu; Lil' Kim
September 26	Düsseldorf	Germany	PSD Bank Dome	Deja Vu; Lil' Kim
September 27	Amsterdam	Netherlands	Ziggo Dome	Deja Vu; Lil' Kim
September 29	Birmingham	England	Utilita Arena Birmingham	Deja Vu; Lil' Kim
September 30	Nottingham	England	Motorpoint Arena Nottingham	Deja Vu; Lil' Kim
October 2	Leeds	England	First Direct Arena	Deja Vu; Lil' Kim
October 3	Liverpool	England	M&S Bank Arena	Deja Vu; Lil' Kim
October 5	Dublin	Ireland	3Arena	Deja Vu; Lil' Kim
October 7	Glasgow	Scotland	OVO Hydro	Deja Vu; Lil' Kim
October 9	Newcastle	England	Utilita Arena Newcastle	Deja Vu; Lil' Kim
October 10	Manchester	England	Co-op Live	Deja Vu; Lil' Kim
October 13	London	England	The O_{2} Arena	Deja Vu; Lil' Kim
October 30	São Paulo	Brazil	Nubank Parque	Pabllo Vittar
October 31	São Paulo	Brazil	Tokio Marine Hall	—N/a

List of 2027 concerts
Date (2027)	City	Country	Venue	Supporting acts
January 17	Bishkek	Kyrgyzstan	Zhashtyk Arena	—N/a
June 6	London	England	Brockwell Park	—N/a

=== Canceled concerts ===
List of canceled concerts
Date (2026)	City	Country	Venue	Reason	Ref.
June 5	Palm Desert	United States	Acrisure Arena	Low ticket sales	
June 9	Phoenix	United States	Talking Stick Resort Amphitheatre	Low ticket sales	
June 10	Chula Vista	United States	North Island Credit Union Amphitheatre	Low ticket sales	
June 12	Mountain View	United States	Shoreline Amphitheatre	Low ticket sales	
June 13	Wheatland	United States	Toyota Amphitheatre	Low ticket sales	
June 15	West Valley City	United States	Utah First Credit Union Amphitheatre	Low ticket sales	
June 18	Kansas City	United States	Morton Amphitheater	Low ticket sales	
June 19	Tinley Park	United States	Credit Union 1 Amphitheatre	Low ticket sales	
June 21	Milwaukee	United States	American Family Insurance Amphitheater	Low ticket sales	
June 23	Maryland Heights	United States	Hollywood Casino Amphitheatre	Low ticket sales	
June 25	Cincinnati	United States	Riverbend Music Center	Low ticket sales	
June 27	Cuyahoga Falls	United States	Blossom Music Center	Low ticket sales	
June 28	Noblesville	United States	Ruoff Music Center	Low ticket sales	
June 30	Grand Rapids	United States	Acrisure Amphitheater	Low ticket sales	
July 1	Clarkston	United States	Pine Knob Music Theatre	Low ticket sales	
July 3	Toronto	Canada	RBC Amphitheatre	Low ticket sales	
July 6	Montreal	Canada	Bell Centre	Low ticket sales	
July 8	Syracuse	United States	Empower Federal Credit Union Amphitheater	Low ticket sales	
July 10	Bangor	United States	Maine Savings Amphitheater	Low ticket sales	
July 11	Mansfield	United States	Xfinity Center	Low ticket sales	
July 12	Uncasville	United States	Mohegan Sun Arena	Low ticket sales	
July 14	Camden	United States	Freedom Mortgage Pavilion	Low ticket sales	
July 15	Holmdel	United States	PNC Bank Arts Center	Low ticket sales	
July 16	Bristow	United States	Jiffy Lube Live	Low ticket sales	
July 19	New York	United States	Madison Square Garden	Low ticket sales	
July 22	Charlotte	United States	Truliant Amphitheater	Low ticket sales	
July 24	West Palm Beach	United States	iTHINK Financial Amphitheatre	Low ticket sales	
July 25	Tampa	United States	MidFlorida Credit Union Amphitheatre	Low ticket sales	
July 26	Alpharetta	United States	Ameris Bank Amphitheatre	Low ticket sales	
July 29	Nashville	United States	Ascend Amphitheater	Low ticket sales	
July 31	The Woodlands	United States	Cynthia Woods Mitchell Pavilion	Low ticket sales	
August 1	Dallas	United States	Dos Equis Pavilion	Low ticket sales	
