= Viva Forever =

1998 single by Spice Girls

Single by Spice Girls

from the album Spiceworld
- Released: 10 July 1998
- Recorded: August 1997
- Studio: Whitfield Street (London)
- Genre: Pop; R&B; Latin pop
- Length: 5:09 (album version); 4:10 (radio edit)
- Label: Virgin
- Songwriters: Spice Girls; Matt Rowe; Richard Stannard
- Producers: Matt Rowe; Richard Stannard

Spice Girls singles chronology
| "(How Does It Feel to Be) On Top of the World" (1998) | "Viva Forever" (1998) | "Goodbye" (1998) |

Music video
- "Viva Forever" on YouTube

"Viva Forever" is a song by English girl group the Spice Girls from their second studio album, Spiceworld (1997). The song was co-written by the group with Matt Rowe and Richard Stannard, while production was handled by the latter two. It is a pop ballad with Spanish-style elements. The song's theme is about a summer romance during a holiday vacation, as the lyrics discuss recent experiences and memories. It was released as the album's fourth and final single on 10 July 1998 by Virgin Records.

The single's commercial release was delayed several times and was poorly promoted, being affected by Geri Halliwell's departure and the subsequent continuation of the Spiceworld Tour by the remaining members. The song was well received by most music critics, with some considering it their best work artistically in 1998. It was a commercial success, debuting atop the UK Singles Chart, becoming the group's seventh number-one single in the United Kingdom and staying at the position for two weeks. It has since been certified platinum by the British Phonographic Industry (BPI). The song was also successful on the music charts in the rest of Europe, as well as Canada and Oceania.

An accompanying music video, directed by Steve Box, features stop motion animation of the group as fairies, and it took five months to be completed. The video was commissioned months before Halliwell's departure and as such, she is featured in it and on the accompanying artwork.

== Background ==
In May 1997, the Spice Girls went on a promotional visit to the Cannes Film Festival in the south of France, where they announced their then-upcoming movie Spice World (1997). The group began shooting scenes for the movie in June. Meanwhile, Virgin Records started the first marketing meetings for the promotional campaign for their second album Spiceworld, which was set to be released in November 1997. No song had been written for the album at this point, so the Spice Girls had to do all the songwriting and recording at the same time as they were shooting the movie. Between takes and at the end of each filming day, the group usually went straight into a mobile recording studio set up in a Winnebago, which followed them between film sets. Their schedule was physically arduous with logistical difficulties, as Melanie Brown commented in her autobiography: "doing the two full-time jobs at the same time took its toll and within a couple on weeks, exhaustion set in".

For the album, the Spice Girls worked with the same songwriting teams and producers from their debut studio album, Spice (1996). But during the recording of the Spiceworld tracks, the group was so busy with the filming schedule that the quality of their musical contributions became more erratic and piecemeal. Andy Watkins, of the production duo Absolute, co-writers of "Who Do You Think You Are" (from the band's previous album) remembered: "We'd sit there literally all day long and quite often we wouldn't even get them at all." Eliot Kennedy, who co-wrote "Say You'll Be There" with the group, worked on a couple of backing tracks for Spiceworld, but decided not to get involved in the album after hearing from the other teams about the complications of the recording schedule.

== Writing and inspiration ==
"Viva Forever" was one of the last songs the group wrote for Spiceworld. It was written at the end of the summer of 1997, after the filming for the Spice World movie had finished. Originally entitled "Obrigado", which means "thank you" in Portuguese, it was later renamed. The song was written by the Spice Girls with the songwriting team Richard "Biff" Stannard and Matt Rowe. They later confirmed that the lyrics were mainly penned by Geri Halliwell. The inspiration for the song's theme came from the idea of a summer romance during a holiday vacation on the Costa Brava or Costa del Sol in the Spanish Mediterranean, and the people the group met during those holidays. Emma Bunton commented about the songwriting process:

When we sat down to write it, we were talking about holiday romances, so that's what came out in the studio. I don't think I've ever had a real holiday romance, but I've met people I'll never forget. You meet so many different people and have nice or weird or romantic experiences with them, and you never forget them, do you?

== Composition and lyrics ==
"Viva Forever"
A 29-second sample of the song, featuring the group singing the chorus, which is preceded by an instrumental that includes an acoustic guitar and string arrangements.

Musically, "Viva Forever" is a pop ballad with R&B influences, and Spanish-style elements. It is written in the key of E♭ minor, with a time signature set in common time, and moves at a slow tempo of 84 beats per minute. The song starts with an instrumental introduction that includes keyboards, an acoustic guitar played by John Themis, and a string section arranged by English composer Anne Dudley. The song is constructed in a verse-chorus form, with an instrumental interlude before the bridge and the third chorus. It uses the sequence of E♭m–B♭m–C♭–G♭ as a chord progression during the verses and the chorus. The song employs Spanish production, including the sounds of castanets and guitars, a flamenco rhythm, and Spanish lyrics–"hasta mañana", translated as "until tomorrow", and "viva" itself, meaning "long live" (i.e.: Viva forever means "live forever", also written in the chorus's lyrics), as the lyrics were mostly written by Geri Halliwell who has maternal Spanish blood and speaks broken Spanish. Tom Ewing from the e-zine Freaky Trigger described it as "wistful music", while Alexis Petridis of The Guardian said that the song has a "note of melancholy" around it.

The lyrics of the song are about past experiences or memories. Talking about them, Bunton explained that in the song's concept, every experience is "like a little dream". She mentioned that the Spice Girls purposely left it "a bit open ended", as in the outcome is not clear if the narrator went back "to reality" or "back to normal"; and added that "it really makes you think–and we try to provoke thought with all our songs". Ewing believed the song encapsulates a very specific moment that he described as "memories of summer love fading at the edges", although he said lyrically, it "does nothing unexpected, and it never makes a move when there's a cheesier one available". El Hunt of NME also remarked on the lyrical content, commenting that it seemed "cribbed from motivational fridge magnets".

== Release and promotion ==
In February 1998, the Spice Girls embarked on the Spiceworld Tour covering Europe and North America, in support of their second studio album. On 22 April 1998, Smash Hits magazine reported the release of the album's fourth single for 25 May, a double A-side consisting of "Viva Forever" with "Never Give Up on the Good Times", a disco influenced track from Spiceworld that was written by the group with Stannard and Rowe. The release date was later postponed.

On 26 May, the group traveled back to the United Kingdom after their tour performance in Helsinki, Finland. The next day, their lawyer, Andrew Thompson, told the rest of the members that Halliwell decided to leave the group. That day, the group were scheduled to appear on The National Lottery Live, where they performed "Viva Forever" and "Spice Up Your Life" without Halliwell, the excuse being that she was ill. Speculation in the press grew, with reports of a midweek row on the plane back from Helsinki, and rumours of a power struggle with Brown as the reason for Halliwell's departure. The Spice Girls then flew to Oslo, Norway, to complete the last two shows of the European segment of the tour performance as a quartet. On 31 May 1998, Halliwell officially announced her departure from the Spice Girls through her solicitor, claiming that she was suffering from exhaustion, and because of differences between the group. She would later admit of having problems with an eating disorder and depression. The remaining group members announced that they would continue through the summer of 1998 with the North American part of the tour as originally planned.

On 15 June, the group traveled to the US to continue with the Spiceworld Tour in West Palm Beach. During the following weeks, the release date of "Viva Forever"–only as a standalone single–was pushed to three different dates in July 1998. Music Week reported that the single was to be released on 4 July, while Smash Hits announced it for 13 July. In late June 1998, the song started to receive airplay across the UK, appearing on the playlists of 46 ILR stations and Capital FM's the Pepsi Chart. It entered the UK Airplay Chart Top 50 on 11 July, and two weeks later, the song reached the top five despite the lukewarm support from Radio One, initially appearing on the B-list, before being promoted to the A-list.

After several delays, "Viva Forever" was commercially released in the UK on 20 July 1998, in three single versions. The first one, an enhanced CD, included the radio edit of the song, an instrumental take, and a remix version by American singer-songwriter and producer Tony Rich. In addition, the CD contained a multimedia programme, which features animated figures of the Spice Girls, scrolling synchronised lyrics, photographs and cartoons of each group member, an animated magic wand cursor that triggers an audio sample, and the music video. This was the first time that interactive multimedia components were available on a Spice Girls CD. The second version, released on a standard CD single, included the radio edit, live versions of "Who Do You Think You Are" and "Say You'll Be There" recorded at the NEC Arena in Birmingham, and a double-side poster. The same track listing was used for the third version of the single, released in cassette format.

== Critical reception ==
"Viva Forever" was met with generally positive reviews from music critics. Amanda Murray of Sputnikmusic described the song as "a genuinely great song" adding that it is "sincerely moving" and that "never would I have imagined the Spice Girls could pull off a song like this". Yahoo! Music complimented the song, saying "a tear-jerking flamenco guitar and lush strings weave into this break-your-heart, 'I Will Always Love You' ballad with a touch of Madonna about it [...] inspired". Ilana Kaplan of Billboard magazine, in a retrospective review of the Spiceworld album also gave the song a positive review, saying "Viva Forever was like the Spice Girls trying their hand at Sade with a fusion of Latin percussion and the vision of a cheesy romance novel. But it worked, and the Spice Girls made a five-minute epic song about living in the moment, but also moving on". "Can't Stop the Pop" also lauded the song, saying "Viva Forever is a brilliant song and very deserving of the success it enjoyed. Lying amidst the caricatured frivolously fun Spiceworld, this track emits a level of musicianship that the Spice Girls had rarely shown to such extent before. In a more mixed review, Gina Arnold of Salon.com felt that the ballads on Spiceworld are bland "but still appealing". Rolling Stone magazine's David Wild cited the song as an example of the album's production of a "rehash of hip-hop and pop clichés", with him adding it is "as convincing as the Spices' Spanish accents". Music Week described the song as a "haunting, flamenco-style ballad", and called it the "ideal summer hit". Writing for the Orange County Register, Cary Darling named the song one of Spiceworld's standout tracks for its "appealing, 'Fernando'-era ABBA internationalism". The staff of the Daily Record considered it the best track in the album, while Smash Hits' critic Alex Needham lauded it as "the best thing they've ever done".

Some critics noted similarities between "Viva Forever" and Madonna's early work, in particular her 1987 song "La Isla Bonita". Nick Krewen of The Hamilton Spectator said that the song does "manage to steal a lick or two from Madonna". Sarah Davis of Dotmusic characterized it as an "'I Will Always Love You' ballad with a touch of Madonna" and a combination of Spanish instrumentation. Chicago Sun-Times' critic Jim DeRogatis called it the Spice Girls' version of "La Isla Bonita", while Greg Kot of the Chicago Tribune viewed it more as a tribute to the song. The Hartford Courant's music writer Roger Catlin, noted the similarities between the two songs and commented that Madonna was "the obvious role model". Ann Powers of The New York Times described the song as "an earnest ballad" and felt that it resembles the sound of Madonna's early albums. When comparing Spiceworld to their debut studio album Spice (1996), Jim Farber of the New York Daily News was unimpressed, but thought that the production had more variety. He labelled the song's sound as "ersatz Spanish" in a manner that is similar to "La Isla Bonita".

== Commercial performance ==
Upon its release as a single, "Viva Forever" debuted atop the UK Singles Chart, becoming the Spice Girls' seventh chart-topper and their first number one as a foursome. The single sold 100,000 copies in the first three days of release and 277,000 in the first week, outselling its closest competitors by about four to one. The song spent two weeks at number one, nine weeks in the top 40, 13 weeks in the top 75, and was certified platinum by the British Phonographic Industry (BPI) for selling 600,000 copies in the UK in August 1998. As of July 2021, it has sold 798,000 combined sales in the country.

"Viva Forever" was commercially successful in the rest of Europe. It reached number two on the Eurochart Hot 100, while peaking inside the top 10 in Austria, Germany, Hungary, Iceland, Ireland, Italy, the Netherlands, Sweden, Switzerland, and Wallonia. It additionally entered the top 20 in Flanders, France, and Norway. The song was a radio hit across the continent, reaching the top position of the European Radio Top 50 for four weeks, topping the airplay charts in the German-speaking countries, and the UK; and peaking inside the top five in Hungary, Italy, Poland, and Scandinavia.

"Viva Forever" peaked at number nine in Taiwan during the last week of July 1998. On 10 August 1998, the song debuted on the Canadian RPM 100 Hit Tracks chart at number 81, later reaching a peak position of number four in its eighth week. It ended at the 57th position on the year-end chart. The song debuted on New Zealand's RIANZ Singles Chart at number one on 23 August 1998, becoming the group's second number one and eighth top-10 single in the country. It stayed at the top for two weeks, while remained on the chart for 11 weeks, and was certified platinum by the Recorded Music NZ (RMNZ) for sales of 30,000 units in October 1998. "Viva "Forever" debuted on the ARIA Singles Chart at number 59 on 30 August 1998. It peaked at number two for two weeks, giving the Spice Girls their sixth top-10 single in Australia. It remained on the chart for 21 weeks, and was certified platinum by the Australian Recording Industry Association (ARIA) for selling 70,000 units in 1998.

After British singer Anne-Marie and contestant Mark Howard performed a version of "Viva Forever" on the final of The Voice series 11 in October 2022, the Spice Girls' original charted at number 73 on the UK Singles Downloads Chart Top 100 on 4 November 2022.

== Music video ==
=== Background ===
The Spice Girls as fairies in the music video for "Viva Forever".

The music video for "Viva Forever", which features stop motion animation of the Spice Girls as fairies, was directed by Academy Award winner Steve Box of Aardman Animations, the British animation studio behind the claymation franchise Wallace and Gromit and the 2000 comedy film Chicken Run. The video was screened for the first time in the UK on 22 June 1998, after five months of shooting, considerably longer than it took to make the Spice World movie. For the fairies, Box created five 12-inch-high tin puppets with wings modelled after each group member, including one for Halliwell, as it was commissioned months before her departure. He commented that the concepts for the video came from children's annuals, such as the comic strip character Rupert Bear, and from Victorian legends of fairies at the bottom of the garden. The music video's main theme is the loss of youth and innocence, which according to Box, matches the song's sentiment of sorrow. He further elaborated:

I came up with this idea for the girls to be tin toy fairies that were like lost toys, which was a little bit of a comment on that modern pop: you buy it, you put your money in, you get your music and then shortly afterwards it will disappear.

According to Box, the atypical concept came from a trend in the music industry. At the time, music videos in the UK were aimed to appear on the television programme The Chart Show, which only showed small clips of the entire video, usually the first verse and chorus of the song. For this reason, he was able to experiment with the animation, and decided to place the most elaborated segment in the beginning of the video. Box commented that this allowed him to "do something really unusual, that was unexpected".

=== Synopsis ===
The music video, set in the 1970s, starts off with a storybook about two boys, who are running around the woods when they encounter a case (similar to the cases inside a Kinder Surprise, but life-sized) that opens by itself, which reveals a toy chicken. The two friends chase after the chicken until they see another case, which the toy chicken bounces on. The case opens by itself, and five fairies – the Spice Girls – fly out. While one of the boys runs away frightened, the other boy stays, and the fairies play with him, give him a kiss on the nose, whisper a secret, and blow pixie dust in his face. They fly the boy to another place in front of a huge Rubik's Cube, then dance on the cube to the song until the middle piece on the top opens. The boy, assisted by the fairies, climbs inside.

Meanwhile, the younger boy sees the fairies about to close the cube. By the time he gets to the cube, his friend and the fairies have vanished inside; the cube becomes smaller, but is still over-sized. He walks in the woods by himself with the cube, which has shrunken to a normal size, until he sees a giant coin-vending machine that contains other cases. A blue light shines in front of him. He puts the now-solved Rubik's Cube inside a case, throws the case into the vending machine, and walks away sadly. The video ends with the fairies flying out of the vending machine, now including the other boy.

== Live performances ==
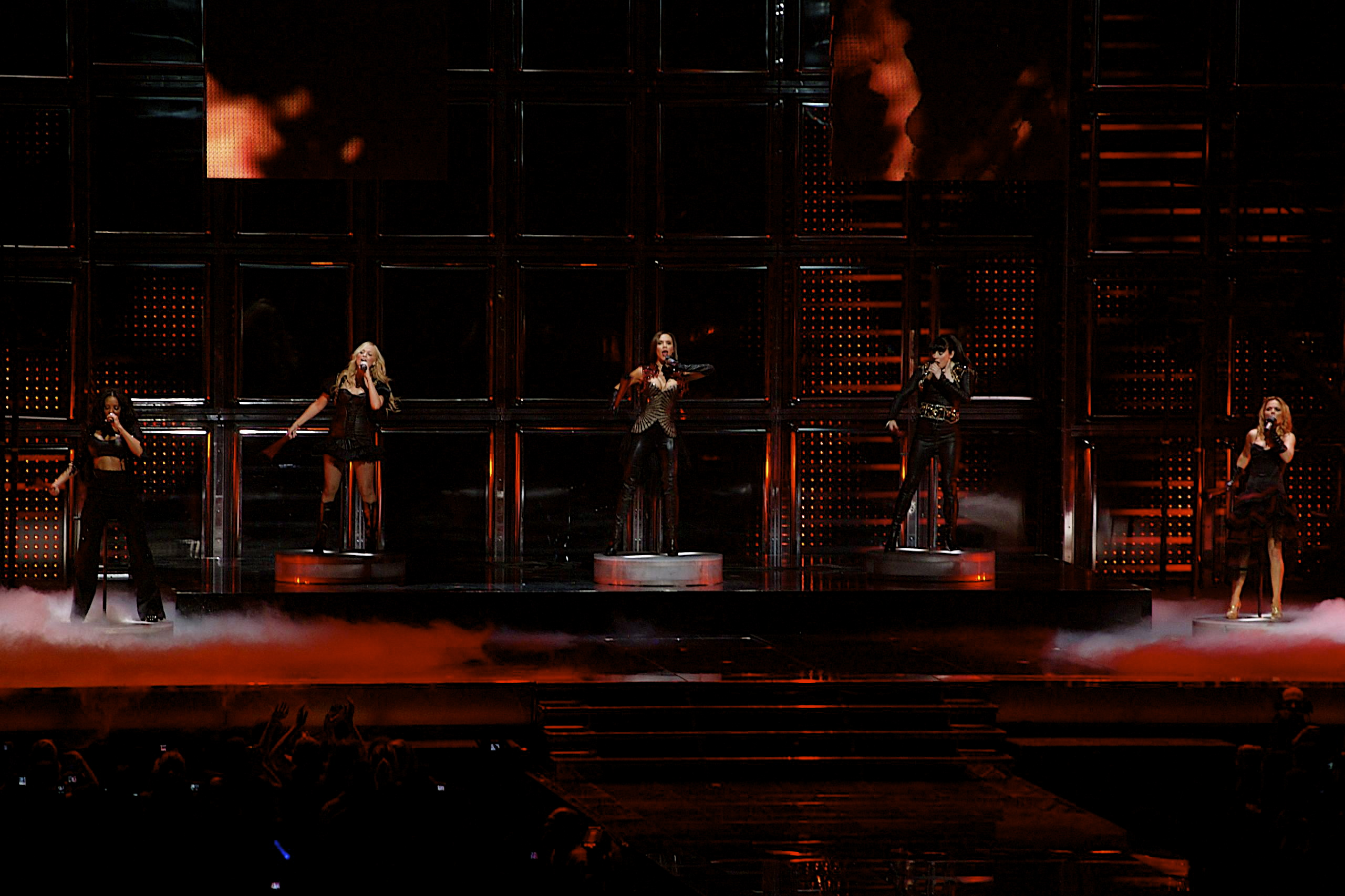
The Spice Girls performing "Viva Forever" while standing on rotating podiums, at the Air Canada Centre in Toronto, during The Return of the Spice Girls Tour, in February 2008.

"Viva Forever" was the group's last song performed on television as a quintet before Halliwell's departure. On 21 May 1998, the group recorded their performance for Top of the Pops, which was broadcast on 5 June 1998. The show's producer, Chris Cowey, said that they originally intended to air the performance for the single's release in July, but then pushed it given Halliwell's departure from the Spice Girls. "Viva Forever" was also the first song they performed on television without Halliwell, on 27 May 1998 at The National Lottery Live. On 13 May 1998, the group taped an appearance for the French television show Hit Machine, where they performed four songs, including "Viva Forever". The show aired later on 5 June 1998. The Spice Girls performed the song with Luciano Pavarotti in Modena, Italy, at the annually hosted Pavarotti & Friends charity concert on 9 June 1998. The performance was broadcast in various countries, and released on the compilation album and DVD entitled Pavarotti & Friends for the Children of Liberia (1998). On 13 July 1998, the Spice Girls performed the song in Toronto as part of their setlist for MuchMusic's programme Intimate and Interactive. In August, while the group were on tour, a taped performance of the song aired on Top of the Pops via satellite from Chicago.

The Spice Girls have performed the song on their four tours, the Spiceworld Tour, the Christmas in Spiceworld Tour, the Return of the Spice Girls Tour, and the Spice World – 2019 Tour. For the Spiceworld Tour, during their performance of "Viva Forever", the group dressed in long white opera-style coats, designed by British stylist Kenny Ho. The performance at the tour's final concert can be found on the video album Spice Girls Live at Wembley Stadium, filmed in London on 20 September 1998, and released on VHS around two months later. The song was re-imagined on the Return of the Spice Girls tour in 2007, with flamenco elements. Following a cape dance interlude, they performed "Viva Forever" with a Latin theme and a tango/fan dance break, and each member standing on rotating podiums, while the performance finished with Halliwell exiting the stage early, acknowledging her leaving the group in 1998. For the Spice World – 2019 Tour, after an interlude called Queer Tango, where two male dancers did a ballet routine before kissing at the end, they launched into the song dressed in flowing gowns.

== Formats and track listings ==
UK/European/Malaysian CD1, Australian/Brazilian/Thai CD

1. "Viva Forever" (Radio Edit) – 4:10
2. "Viva Forever" (Tony Rich Remix) – 5:30
3. "Viva Forever" (Tony Rich Instrumental) – 5:42
4. "Viva Forever" (Interactive Video) – 4:10

UK/European/Malaysian CD2

1. "Viva Forever" (Radio Edit) – 4:10
2. "Who Do You Think You Are" (Live) – 4:22
3. "Say You'll Be There" (Live) – 4:25

Japanese CD

1. "Viva Forever" (Radio Edit) – 4:10
2. "Viva Forever" (Tony Rich Remix) – 5:30
3. "Who Do You Think You Are" (Live) – 4:22
4. "Say You'll Be There" (Live) – 4:25

European 2-track/French CD

1. "Viva Forever" (Radio Edit) – 4:10
2. "Viva Forever" (Tony Rich Remix) – 5:30

UK/Australian Cassette

1. "Viva Forever" (Radio Edit) – 4:10
2. "Who Do You Think You Are" (Live) – 4:22
3. "Say You'll Be There" (Live) – 4:25

Digital EP

1. "Viva Forever" (Radio Edit) – 4:14
2. "Who Do You Think You Are" (Live) – 4:22
3. "Say You'll Be There" (Live) – 4:26
4. "Viva Forever" (Tony Rich Remix) – 5:21
5. "Viva Forever" (Tony Rich Instrumental) – 5:42

== Credits and personnel ==
Credits of "Viva Forever" adapted from the booklet of Spiceworld:

- Spice Girls – lyrics, vocals
- Matt Rowe – lyrics, producer, keyboards and programming
- Richard Stannard – lyrics, producer
- Mark "Spike" Stent – audio mixing
- Adrian Bushby – recording engineer
- Paul "P. Dub" Walton – assistant
- Pete Davis – additional programming
- Jake Davies – additional engineering
- John Themis – acoustic guitar
- Anne Dudley – string arrangement

Credits of the remixes, interactive elements and artwork adapted from the liner notes of the "Viva Forever" CD singles UK CD1 and UK CD2:

"Tony Rich Remix" and "Tony Rich Instrumental"

- Tony Rich – remixing

Interactive Video

- AMX Digital – enhanced element

Artwork

- Aardman Animations – puppets design
- Dean Freeman – photography
- Joe@Virgin Art – design

== Charts ==
=== Weekly charts ===
Weekly chart performance for "Viva Forever"
| Chart (1998) | Peak position |
|---|---|
| Australia (ARIA) | 2 |
| Austria (Ö3 Austria Top 40) | 4 |
| Belgium (Ultratop 50 Flanders) | 13 |
| Belgium (Ultratop 50 Wallonia) | 9 |
| Canada Top Singles (RPM) | 4 |
| Canada Adult Contemporary (RPM) | 5 |
| Estonia (Eesti Top 20) | 1 |
| Eurochart Hot 100 (Music & Media) | 2 |
| France (SNEP) | 18 |
| Germany (GfK) | 4 |
| Hungary (Mahasz) | 2 |
| Iceland (Íslenski Listinn Topp 40) | 2 |
| Ireland (IRMA) | 2 |
| Italy (Musica e dischi) | 2 |
| Italy Airplay (Music & Media) | 4 |
| Netherlands (Dutch Top 40) | 7 |
| Netherlands (Single Top 100) | 7 |
| New Zealand (Recorded Music NZ) | 1 |
| Norway (VG-lista) | 12 |
| Scottish Singles Sales (Official Charts) | 1 |
| Sweden (Sverigetopplistan) | 6 |
| Switzerland (Schweizer Hitparade) | 3 |
| Taiwan (IFPI) | 9 |
| UK Singles (Official Charts) | 1 |
| UK Airplay (Music Week) | 1 |

Weekly chart performance for "Viva Forever"
| Chart (2022) | Peak position |
|---|---|
| Israel (Media Forest) | 9 |
| UK Downloads (OCC) | 73 |

Weekly chart performance for "Viva Forever"
| Chart (2025) | Peak position |
|---|---|
| UK Downloads (OCC) | 42 |

=== Year-end charts ===
1998 year-end chart performance for "Viva Forever"
| Chart (1998) | Position |
|---|---|
| Australia (ARIA) | 23 |
| Austria (Ö3 Austria Top 40) | 21 |
| Belgium (Ultratop 50 Wallonia) | 42 |
| Brazil (Crowley) | 74 |
| Canada Top Singles (RPM) | 57 |
| Canada Adult Contemporary (RPM) | 38 |
| Eurochart Hot 100 (Music & Media) | 21 |
| France (SNEP) | 78 |
| Germany (Media Control) | 19 |
| Iceland (Íslenski Listinn Topp 40) | 38 |
| Netherlands (Dutch Top 40) | 42 |
| Netherlands (Single Top 100) | 38 |
| New Zealand (RIANZ) | 16 |
| Sweden (Hitlistan) | 30 |
| Switzerland (Schweizer Hitparade) | 16 |
| UK Singles (OCC) | 13 |
| UK Airplay (Music Week) | 39 |

== Certifications and sales ==
Certifications and sales for "Viva Forever"
| Region | Certification | Certified units/sales |
|---|---|---|
| Australia (ARIA) | Platinum | 70,000^{^} |
| Belgium (BRMA) | Gold | 25,000^{*} |
| France (SNEP) | Gold | 250,000^{*} |
| Germany (BVMI) | Gold | 250,000^{^} |
| New Zealand (RMNZ) | Platinum | 10,000^{*} |
| Sweden (GLF) | Gold | 15,000^{^} |
| Switzerland (IFPI Switzerland) | Gold | 25,000^{^} |
| United Kingdom (BPI) | Platinum | 798,000 |
^{*} Sales figures based on certification alone.^{^} Shipments figures based on certification alone.

== Release history ==
Release dates and formats for "Viva Forever"
| Region | Date | Format(s) | Label(s) | Ref(s). |
|---|---|---|---|---|
| France | 10 July 1998 | CD; maxi CD | EMI | |
| Germany | 20 July 1998 | Maxi CD | EMI | |
| United Kingdom | 20 July 1998 | Cassette; enhanced CD; maxi CD | Virgin | |
| Japan | 29 July 1998 | Maxi CD | Toshiba EMI | |
| Australia | 9 August 1998 | Maxi CD (limited edition) | EMI | |
