= Club Song =

2026 single by the Pussycat Dolls

Single by the Pussycat Dolls
- Released: March 12, 2026
- Genre: Dance-pop
- Length: 2:28
- Label: Self-released
- Songwriters: Nicole Scherzinger; Mike Sabath; Caroline Ailin; Sarah "Solly" Solovay
- Producer: Mike Sabath

The Pussycat Dolls singles chronology
"React" (2020)	"Club Song" (2026)

Lyric video
- "Club Song" on YouTube

"Club Song" is a song recorded by American girl group the Pussycat Dolls. It was released on March 12, 2026. It marks their first release in over six years since "React" in 2020. "Club Song" was written by member Nicole Scherzinger alongside Mike Sabath, Caroline Ailin and Sarah "Solly" Solovay, with Sabath handling the production of the track. It marks their first release as a trio, and was released in promotion of their comeback tour, PCD Forever (2026). The song was composed of Nicole Scherzinger, Kimberly Wyatt and Ashley Roberts.

== Background and release ==
The Pussycat Dolls reunited in November 2019 for The X Factor: Celebrity finale, performing past hits and their new single "React." Melody Thornton declined to participate, focusing on solo projects. They released "React" in February 2020 and stated that if the reception was positive, they would release more music. It became their eleventh top-forty single on the UK Singles Chart. Their reunion tour faced repeated COVID-19 pandemic delays and a legal dispute between Robin Antin and Nicole Scherzinger over creative control and business interests. The tour was cancelled in January 2022, disappointing former members Carmit Bachar and Jessica Sutta, who said they had not been informed beforehand. The dispute was settled in November 2025. By February 2026, reports indicated that Ashley Roberts, Scherzinger, and Kimberly Wyatt would reunite for a planned world tour.

On March 11, the Official Charts Company confirmed the trio’s reunion and that they would release a new single, "Club Song", on March 12, simultaneously announcing the PCD Forever Tour. Wyatt, described the song as exciting, recalling that Scherzinger played it for her for the first time. She praised its beat and said performing it together on stage would be "epic", adding that the song felt like a fitting introduction to a new generation of the group. Scherzinger recorded her part in Nashville, while Roberts and Wyatt recorded theirs in London. Scherzinger lead the reunion, concluding they had a similar outlook and were comfortable with where they are in their lives now. Bachar has said she doesn’t know why she was excluded, while Sutta has claimed the group saw her as a "liability" due to her support for Robert F. Kennedy Jr. and identification with MAGA, calling the reunion a "cash grab." The group is managed by Crush Music and represented by CAA, and is self-released via an exclusive licensing agreement with Many Hats Distribution. The cover artwork was photographed by Rankin. Following the announcement, the trio appeared in promotional interviews across UK radio, BBC Radio 1, BBC Radio 2, Capital, Heart, Hits Radio, and Magic Radio, and gave their first television interview on BBC’s The One Show on March 13.

== Composition and lyrics ==
"Club Song" was written and produced by Mike Sabath, who co-wrote the track alongside member Scherzinger, Caroline Ailin, and Sarah "Solly" Solovay. At 2 minutes and 28 seconds, It is a dance-pop song, with R&B, synth-pop, Latin, Middle Eastern, and Bollywood influences. The production opens with an acappella warning line "(Don’t bring your boyfriend to the club") from the trio, before a spoken "Dolls" tag. It progresses into a beat driven by "whirring synths" and a "choppy, guitar bed." Several journalists found "Club Song" is reminiscent to the group's earlier catalog. Carl Smith of the Official Charts Company particularly compared it to "Don't Cha", "Buttons", "Magic", "Jai Ho! (You Are My Destiny)" and "When I Grow Up". Smith felt that Sabath's production helped it to fit into the current pop music landscape, writing: "this isn’t a rehash. It’s a hard restart." The lyrical content of the song explores feminist themes of confidence and independence and is a track "by the girls, for the girls". It celebrates women’s sexuality while calling out an unsatisfying partner.

== Commercial performance ==
In the United Kingdom, the single debuted at number 25 on the UK Singles Downloads Chart, peaking a week later at number 10.

== Personnel ==
Credits are adapted from the Official Charts Company and Tidal.

- Caroline Ailin – songwriting
- Florrie Arnold – vocal production
- Andrew Bolooki – vocal production
- Chris Gehringer – mastering
- Tony Maserati – mixing
- Ashley Roberts – vocals
- Mike Sabath – production, songwriting
- Nicole Scherzinger – lead vocals, songwriting
- Suzy Shinn – vocal production
- Sarah "Solly" Solovay – songwriting
- Kimberly Wyatt – vocals

== Charts ==
Chart performance
Chart (2026)	Peak position
New Zealand Hot Singles (RMNZ)	31
UK Singles Sales (OCC)	12

== Release history ==
Release history
Date	Format	Label	Ref.
March 12, 2026	Digital download; streaming	Self-released	
