= Deja Vu (group) =

British-Venezuelan girl group

- Deja Vu performing in 2026 (L–R): Elle Botterill, Carolina Diaz and Tyrece Lewis

Background information
- Origin: London, England
- Genres: R&B; pop; Latin pop
- Years active: 2020–present
- Members: Elle Botterill; Carolina Diaz; Tyrece Lewis
- Past members: Sophie Nascimento

Deja Vu are a British-Venezuelan girl group consisting of members Elle Botterill, Carolina Diaz and Tyrece Lewis. After forming in 2020, they competed on the series twelve of The Voice UK in 2023, where they reached the semi-finals. In 2025, they released their debut single "Hot" which was included on their debut extended play Karma. The following year they opened up for The Pussycat Dolls on their PCD Forever Tour for the European Leg.

== History ==
Deja Vu came together during the COVID-19 pandemic, so had little experience performing in public. Together, they spent a week on a caravan park to form the sound they wanted for their group. They made their debut performance in 2023 when auditioning for series twelve of The Voice UK; their performance opened the series. They performed the song "Unholy" by Sam Smith and Kim Petras, where all four judges turned their chairs for the group. Deja Vu selected Anne-Marie to be their mentor for the series. In the callback stage of the series, the group performed the Britney Spears song "Lucky", where they progressed to the semi-finals. For the semi-finals, they performed "Beautiful Liar" by Beyoncé and Shakira, after which they were eliminated.

After competing in The Voice UK, they released their debut single, "Get Down". After having gained a following on social media platforms Instagram and TikTok, they began writing more music. Speaking about the process, they stated that since Venezuelan member Carolina Diaz had always written songs in Spanish, it "just made sense" to incorporate Spanish verses into their music. Deja Vu then released the song "Hot", followed by "Hell Yeah". Both songs topped the Future Hits Radio charts. They released their third single, "Baddie", in August 2025. From September to October 2026, they supported the Pussycat Dolls on their PCD Forever Tour.

== Members ==
=== Elle Botterill ===
Elle Botterill was born in Buckinghamshire and at a young age, trained for two years as a gymnast for the Great British Olympic squad. Botterill was also an actress. She portrayed Amanda Thripp in a West End theatre production of Matilda the Musical, as well as playing Brigitta von Trapp in a touring production of The Sound of Music. Botterill then starred in the CBBC series The Demon Headmaster and recurred in the CBBC series Jamie Johnson.

=== Carolina Diaz ===
Carolina Diaz was born in Venezuela and raised in Panama. She grew up influenced by singers including Franco de Vita, Shakira and Queen. In 2019, she began releasing music and performing in bars and rooftops in Panama City. A year later, she was invited via social media to join Deja Vu and moved to London.

=== Tyrece Lewis ===
Tyrece Lewis was born and raised in High Wycombe, Buckinghamshire. She became interested in performing arts at an early age and studied performance, eventually garnering a degree in drama and performance. During her time at university, a modelling agency signed her. Despite this, Lewis focused on music and eventually joined Deja Vu.

== Discography ==
=== Extended plays ===
Title	Album details
Karma	Released: 17 October 2025; Label: Independent; Formats: Digital download, streaming

=== Singles ===
Title	Year	Album
"Hot"	2025	Karma
"Hell Yeah"	2025	Karma
"Baddie"	2025	Karma
"No Better Than a Man"	2026	TBA
