= Anthonia Edwards =

- Born: 12 September 2000 (age 26)
- Origin: Blackheath, England
- Occupation: Singer
- Instruments: Vocals
- Labels: Polydor; EMI

Anthonia Edwards (born 12 September 2000) is an English singer and nurse from Blackheath. She won the eleventh series of The Voice UK.

== Career ==
In 2022, Anthonia auditioned for the eleventh series of The Voice UK, and joined Tom Jones's team. After covering Justin Bieber's "Anyone", she was announced as the winner of the series.

Anthonia is currently a backing singer in the ABBA Voyage live band.

Performed	Song	Original Artist	Result
Blind Audition	"Unconditionally"	Katy Perry	Joined Team Tom Jones
Callbacks	"Pride (In the Name of Love)" (against Lee Jones and Tobi Kaye)	U2	Winner
Semi-Final	"Praying"	Ke$ha	Safe
Final	When The Party's Over	Billie Eilish	Winner
Final	"It's a Man's Man's Man's World" (with Tom Jones)	James Brown	Winner
Final	"Anyone"	Justin Bieber	Winner

== Discography ==
=== Singles ===
Title	Year	Album
"Summer Sessions"	2022	Non-album single
"Anyone"	2022	Non-album single
"All I Do is Try"	2023	Non-album single
"—" denotes releases that did not chart or were not released in that territory.
