= Áine Carroll =

Áine Carroll may refer to:

- Áine Carroll, contestant in The Voice UK (series 5)
- Dr. Áine Carroll, of Health Service Executive (Ireland)
