= Terrence Michael Walsh =

Johnny Dole
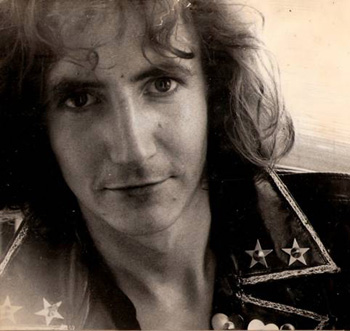
- Terrence Michael Walsh a.k.a. Johnny Dole

Background information
- Also known as: Fox (nick name)
- Born: Terrence Michael Walsh; 6 November 1953; Liverpool, England
- Died: 9 August 1987 (aged 33) Darlinghurst, New South Wales, Australia
- Genres: Punk rock, rock, rock and roll
- Instruments: Vocals, guitar, piano, bass
- Years active: 1970–1983
- Formerly of: Johnny Dole & the Scabs
- Website: Tribute To Johnny Dole

Terrence Michael Walsh (6 November 1953 – 9 August 1987) was an English-born Australian singer, songwriter and musician. Born in Liverpool and immigrated to Sydney with his mother and father in early 1962. He was best known as Johnny Dole, lead singer and one of the founding members of the Sydney punk rock band Johnny Dole & the Scabs (1977–78).

== Early life ==
Growing up in the Sydney suburb of Marrickville, and coming from a family with a background in entertainment – including his grandmother, Elsie Brown, who was a vaudevillian style banjo player/entertainer, and his father, who was also a singer and dancer – it was natural that Walsh would follow in their footsteps.

His mother Betty, affectionately known as "Vicki" would take him to many talent quests encouraging him to be as good as he could and his singing was improving all the time. By the age of 14, Walsh had sent away for his first "mail order" guitar from the Melody School of Music. Enlisting the services of guitar teacher Lynton Bridge of Campsie and with lots of hard work he was soon playing like a pro.

== The 70s ==
During the early 1970s, Walsh sang and performed in many Sydney bands including Eddy Halley & the Starliters featuring Tony Haley. On Walsh's suggestion, they changed their name to Eddy Holly and Sirikit. They were a 50s revival band doing recreations of 50s artists such as Elvis Presley, Buddy Holly and Eddie Cochran, who were some of Walsh's heroes. During his time with Eddy Holly and Sirikit he was using the stage name Mike Walsh, to cash in on the TV host of the same name. In 1975 he formed the Strays who would slowly morph into Johnny Dole & the Scabs by 1977.

== Return To England ==
After the breakup of Johnny Dole & the Scabs in 1978, he returned to England, where the punk scene was in full swing, in the hope of forming a new band, the Crooked Hearts, with Bob Short ex-Filth bass player and Peter Mullany ex–Johnny Dole & the Scabs guitarist, but his increasing use of drugs was becoming a problem, and the Crooked Hearts soon disbanded. Mullany himself would soon return to Australia and form the band Sekret Sekret with friends David Virgin and Dan Rumor, who would then go on to form the Cruel Sea with Tex Perkins.

== Death ==
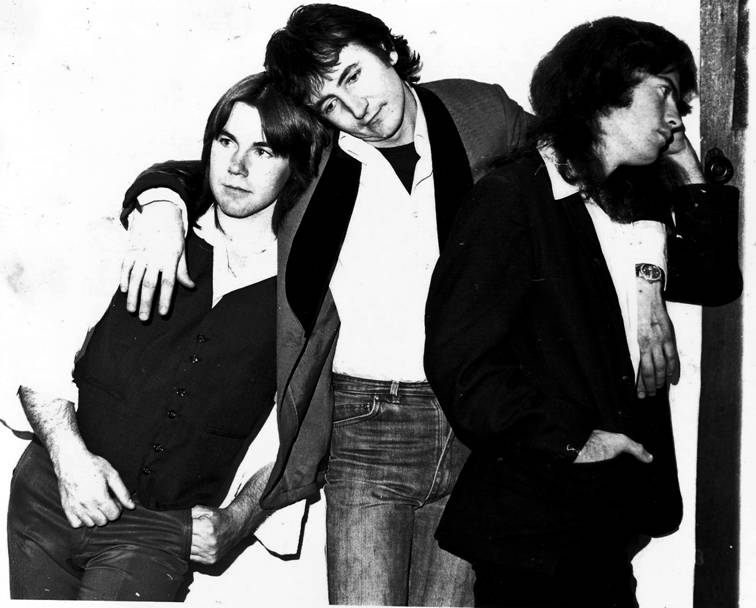
Switchblade, circa 1983

Walsh returned to Australia in 1979 and formed a number of short-lived bands, including the Shakers and Switchblade. But by 1983 his drug use was now out of control, and he could no longer perform. With a continuing decline in his health, he died alone in a rented room in Darlinghurst, where his body was not found for five or six days after he had died 9 August 1987, aged 33, official cause of death, accidental overdose.
