= Lydia Lucy =

- Born: Lydia Lucy White; 9 July 1993 (age 33); Romford, London, England
- Occupations: Singer television personality
- Years active: 2013–present
- Television: The X Factor (2013–2014); The Voice UK (2016)
- Spouse: Tommy Watson (m. 2025)
- Children: 1
- Musical career

Lydia Lucy White (born 9 July 1993) from Collier Row, Greater London, is an English singer and television personality. She has been featured in many acts by will.i.am and other musicians. In 2013, she featured in the tenth series of The X Factor, where she was mentored by Nicole Scherzinger, reaching the six-chair challenge. In 2016, she reached the final of the fifth series of The Voice UK and was mentored by will.i.am.

== Career ==
=== The X Factor ===
In 2013, Lydia was a contestant on the tenth series of The X Factor. At her room audition, she sang "Mamma Knows Best" by Jessie J, followed by her arena audition, where she sang "The Way You Make Me Feel" by Michael Jackson. At Bootcamp, Lydia sang "For Once in My Life" by Stevie Wonder and was given a seat; however, she was eliminated after mentor Nicole Scherzinger swapped her with Abi Alton.

The X Factor performances and results
Show	Song choice	Original Artist	Theme	Result
Room Audition	"Mamma Knows Best"	Jessie J	—N/a	Through to bootcamp
Arena Audition	"The Way You Make Me Feel"	Michael Jackson	—N/a	Through to bootcamp
Bootcamp	"For Once in My Life"	Stevie Wonder	—N/a	Eliminated

=== Open Mic UK ===
Lydia was a contestant in Open Mic UK in 2014, performing at the Palace Theatre in Essex.

=== The Voice UK ===
In 2016, she auditioned for the fifth series of The Voice UK. For her audition, she sang "Trouble" by Iggy Azalea and Jennifer Hudson. Three coaches (will.i.am, Boy George and Ricky Wilson) turned for her; however, she picked will.i.am. At the battles, she sang "Cryin'" by Aerosmith against fellow team member, Irene Alano-Rhodes. She won the battle and advanced to the knockouts. At The Knockouts, Lydia sang "I Knew You Were Trouble" by Taylor Swift, and was chosen, along with Lauren Lapsley-Browne and Lyrickal, to advance to the live shows. In Week 1, she sang "Somebody Else's Guy" by Jocelyn Brown and she advanced to the second live show. In the semi-final, she sang "I'll Be There" by The Jackson 5 and made it to the final. In the final, she sang "No One" by Alicia Keys and sang Boys & Girls with her mentor, will.i.am. She finished in fourth place in the first round of the finals.

The Voice UK performances and results
Show	Song choice	Original Artist	Result
Audition	"Trouble"	Iggy Azalea	Advanced
Battle Rounds	"Cryin'" (against Irene Alano-Rhodes)	Aerosmith	Advanced
Knockouts	"I Knew You Were Trouble"	Taylor Swift	Advanced
Live Quarter Final	"Somebody Else's Guy"	Jocelyn Brown	Advanced
Live Semi-final	"I'll Be There"	The Jackson 5	Advanced
Live Final	"No One"	Alicia Keys	Fourth place
Live Final	"Boys & Girls" (with will.i.am)	will.i.am ft. Pia Mia	Fourth place

=== Post–The Voice UK ===
In August 2016, she featured on a song with Cristian MJC called "True Colours".

In March 2017, she announced on Phoenix FM that she was recording her debut album, and previewed her new song "Instagram".

== Personal life ==
Lucy used to date Nathan Sykes of The Wanted. She has a daughter born in 2021 with husband Tommy Watson, whom she married in August 2025.

== Discography ==
=== Singles ===
==== As featured artist ====
Title	Year	Album
"True Colours" (Cristian MJC featuring Lydia Lucy)	2016	Non-album singles
"Tempted" (Damon Hess & Deep Matter featuring Lydia Lucy)	2018	Non-album singles

== Television ==
Year	Title	Role
2013	The X Factor	Herself/Contestant
2016	The Voice UK	Herself/Contestant
