= The Voice UK series 5 =

British TV music talent show (BBC One, 2016)

The Voice UK
- Series 5
- Hosted by: Emma Willis; Marvin Humes
- Coaches: will.i.am Ricky Wilson; Boy George; Paloma Faith
- Winner: Kevin Simm
- Winning mentor: Ricky Wilson
- Runner-up: Jolan
- Finals venue: Elstree Studios
- No. of episodes: 15

Release
- Original network: BBC One
- Original release: 9 January – 9 April 2016

Series chronology
- ← Previous; Series 4 Next → Series 6

The Voice UK is a British television music competition to find new singing talent. The fifth series began airing on 9 January 2016 on BBC One. The series is hosted by Emma Willis and Marvin Humes, and are joined by coaches will.i.am and Ricky Wilson. Rita Ora did not appear in this series of the show after joining The X Factor and was replaced by Boy George. In addition, Sir Tom Jones did not return and was replaced by Paloma Faith, leaving will.i.am as the only coach remaining from the inaugural series.

The fifth series was the last to be aired on BBC One as The Voice UK would move to ITV in 2017. On 13 November, Wilson confirmed that this would be his last series. On 9 April 2016 former Liberty X singer Kevin Simm was announced as the winner of the series, making him the first stolen artist to win the series. This also gave Ricky Wilson his second and final win as a coach, making him the first coach to win a consecutive season. This was the final series to feature Wilson as a coach, and the only series to feature Boy George and Paloma Faith, and the final series to feature Humes as a presenter.

== Coaches ==
Coaches and Presenters for Series 5 of The Voice UK

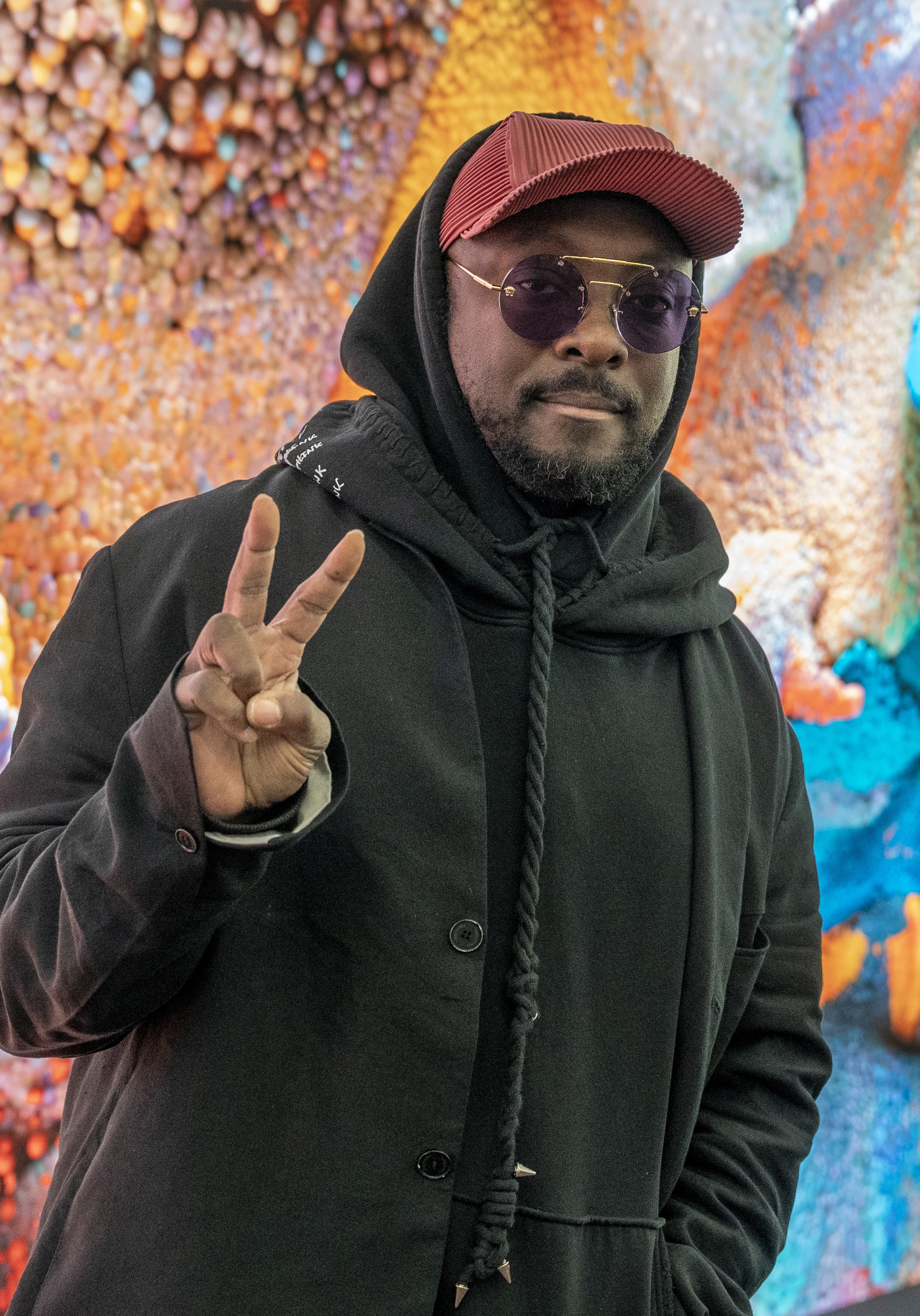
will.i.am

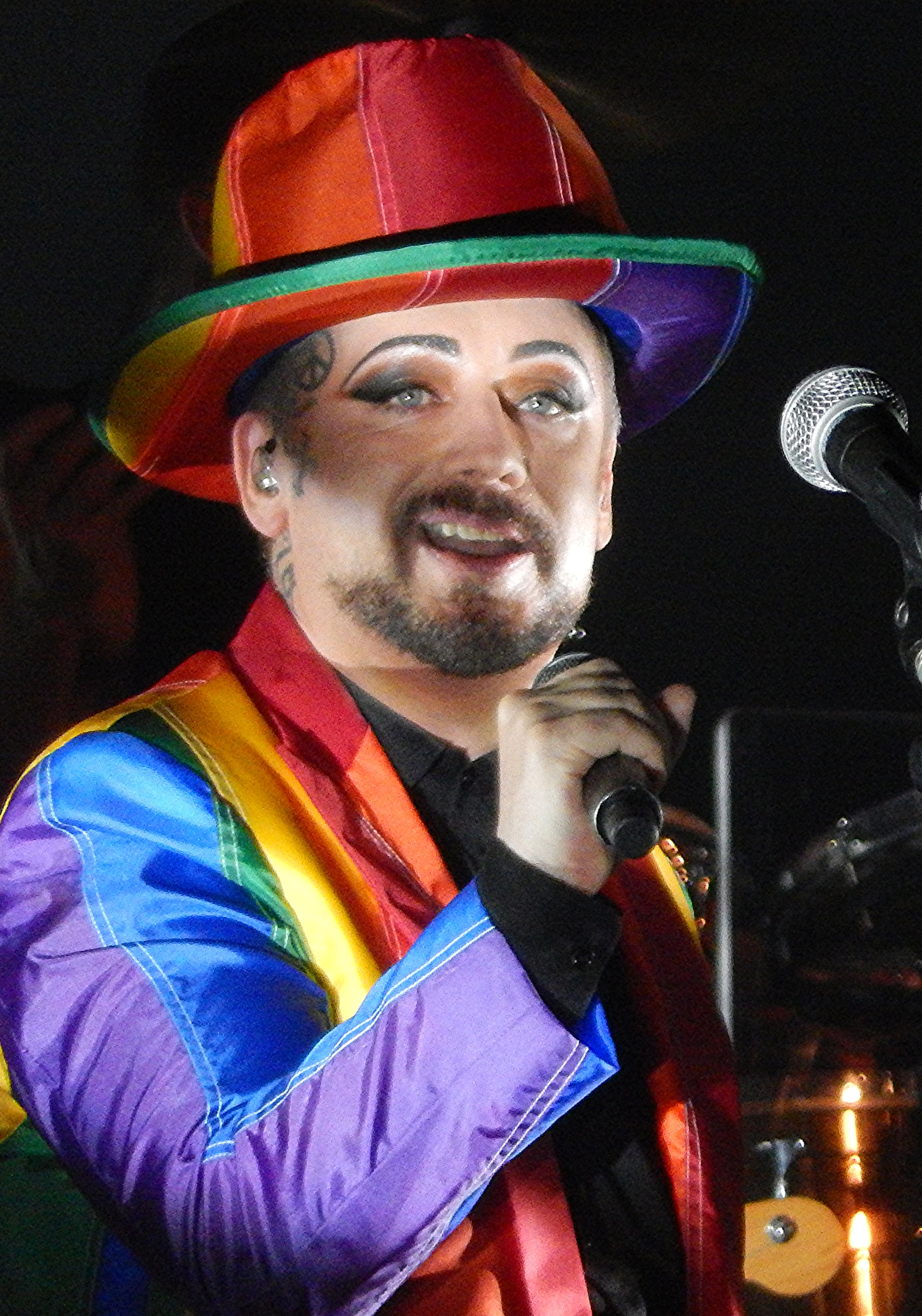
Boy George

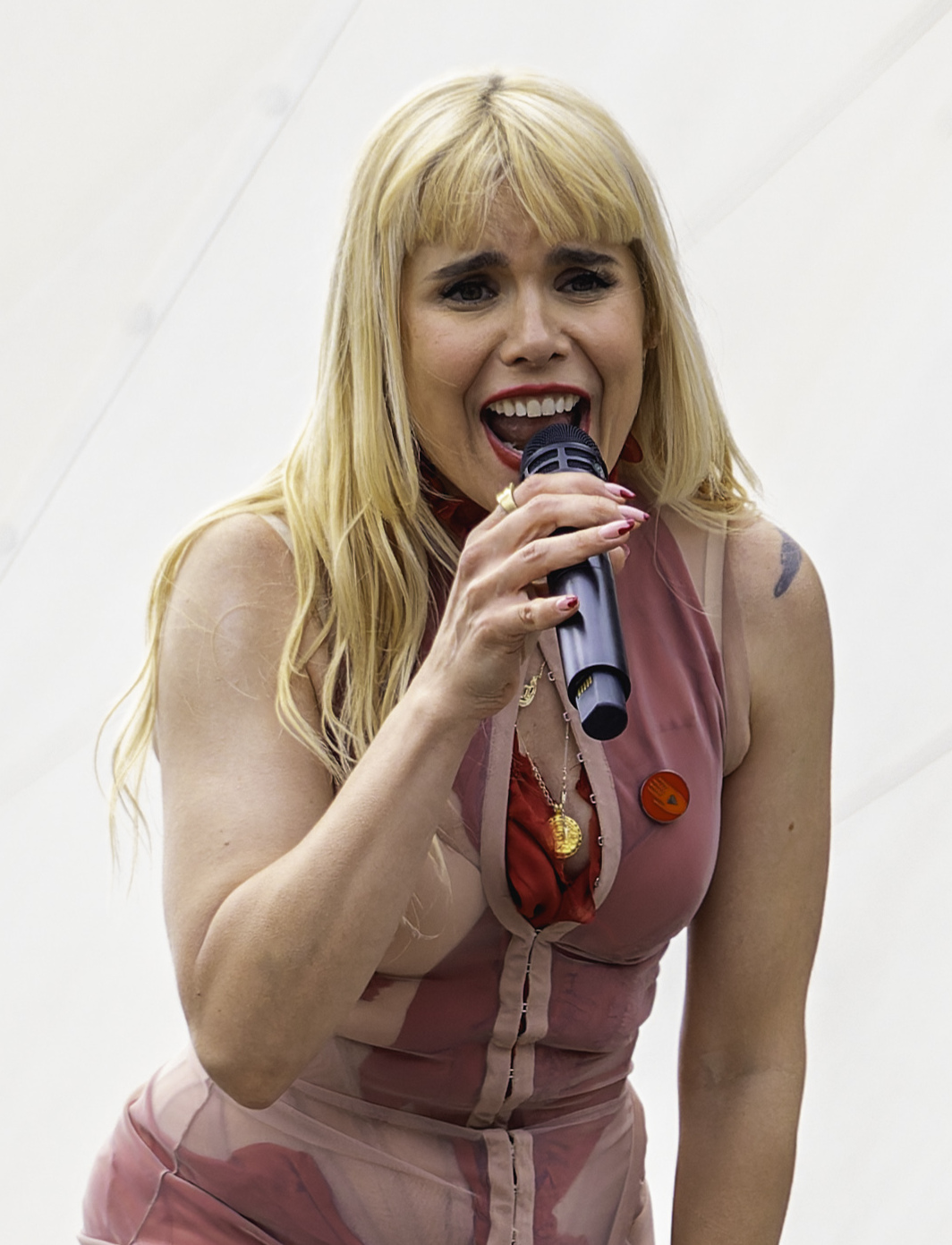
Paloma Faith

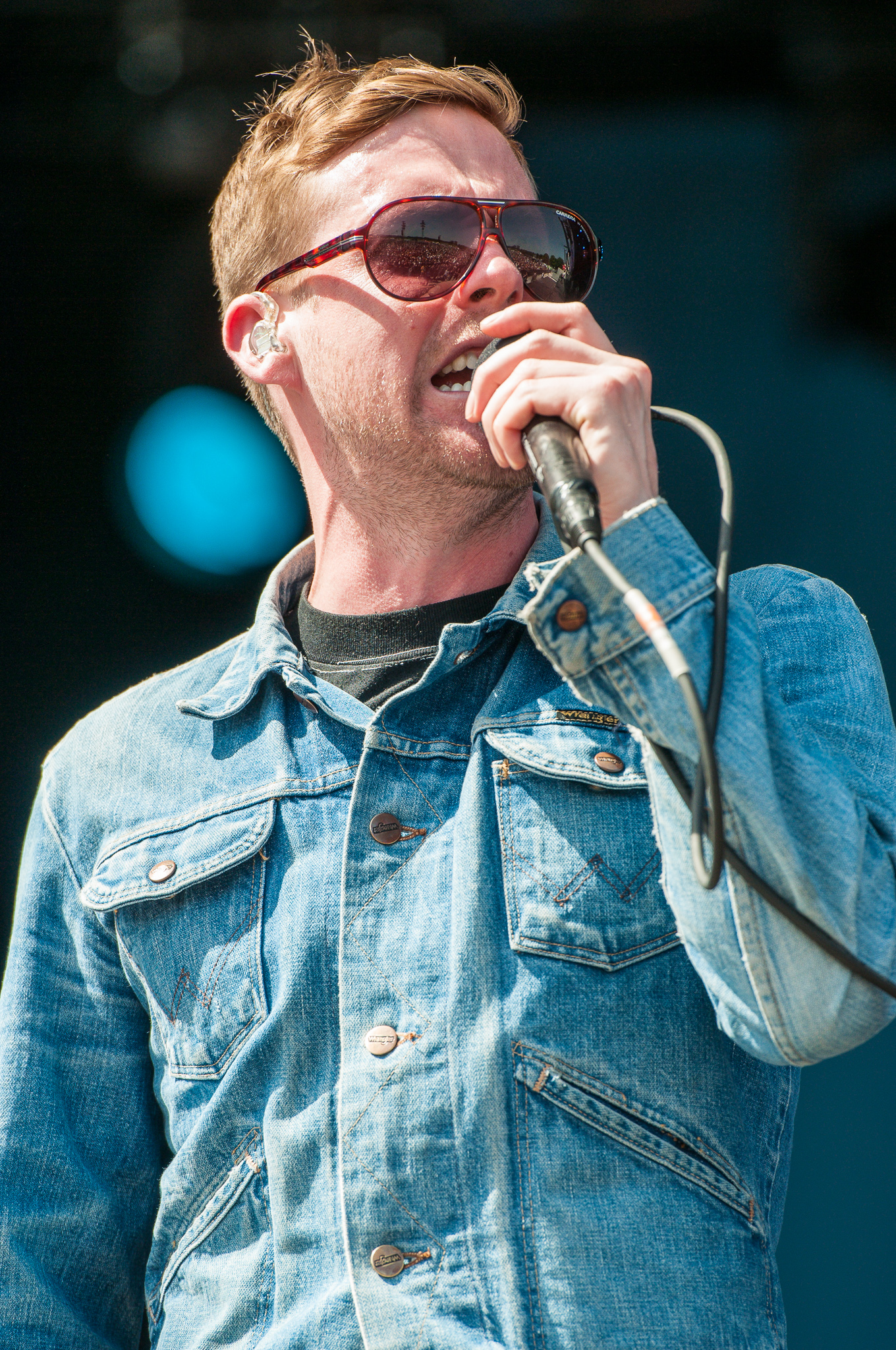
Ricky Wilson

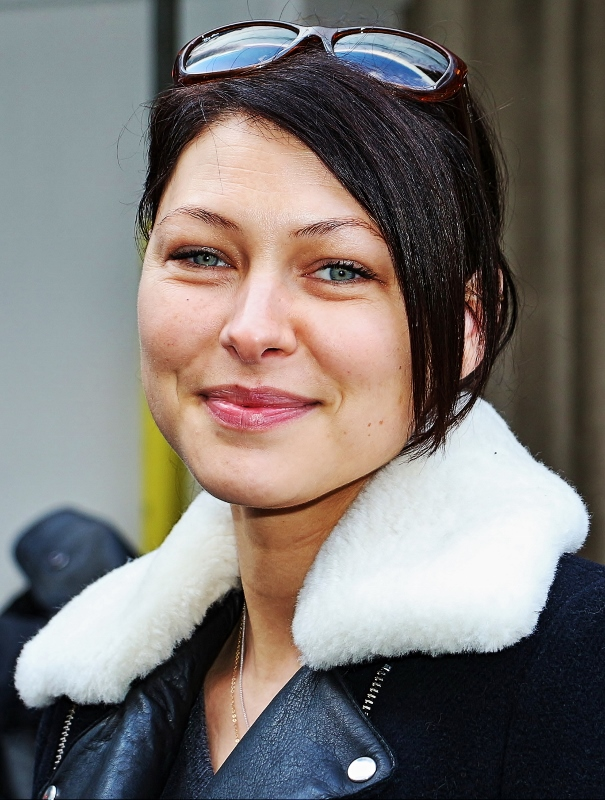
Emma Willis (host)

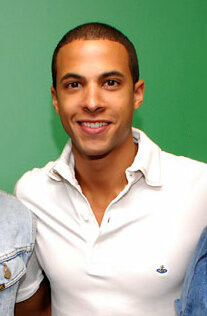
Marvin Humes (host)

On 15 April 2015, the Daily Mirror reported that Simon Cowell said he "saw Rita on The Voice and I thought she was very good. When it comes to asking her over, you know, it's fair game", prompting rumours that Ora was set to join his show, The X Factor. However, these rumours were squashed at the end of April after bosses on The X Factor decided "not to pursue her". On 6 June 2015, it was reported once again that Ora could be leaving the show and taking up a place on The X Factor following weeks of rumours. A week later, Ora broke her silence on the topic, saying that "it is nice to even be rumoured to be in the running". She also said that "watching a bidding war going on makes me feel special". On 16 June 2015, it was officially confirmed that Ora had joined The X Factor alongside new judge Nick Grimshaw, Cheryl Fernandez-Versini and Cowell. It was later confirmed that day that Ora wouldn't be returning to The Voice. During an appearance on BBC One's The Graham Norton Show, Norton teased her about leaving The Voice, asking if this would be her last appearance on BBC One. Ora responded saying "I love the BBC and the BBC love me back. And it was a great experience. [...] But honestly, it was all about time, and when I shoot The Voice, I'm not in the country, and so I technically wouldn't be able to do it anyway. But literally, that's the truth. They knew I couldn't have done it because my second album comes out then."

In May 2014, The Voice UK executive producer Moira Ross said that she was hoping Kylie Minogue would return to the show for its 2016 series: "Kylie's doing her world tour, so she's not available for series four's filming dates, but hopefully we'll have her back for series five. So it's a little hiatus." During an appearance on Alan Carr: Chatty Man in the same month, Minogue said that whilst she "can't go back next season (series four) [...] the season beyond that...it's an open book. Let's see." On 28 May 2015, So You Think You Can Dance judge Jason Derulo told the Daily Star that he was in talks to join The Voice UK: "there's some talk about me doing The Voice here. It's a cool show, there's interest from both parties, myself and them." He also praised will.i.am, saying that he'd "like to sit with will.i.am." Following Ora's exit, Paloma Faith became favourite to join the show on 20 June 2015. On 25 June 2015, The Voice of Ireland coach Rachel Stevens told OK! magazine that "if they [the producers] called, I'd be there in a second". In addition, she commented that due to her experience on the Irish version of the show, she thinks she is the best person to replace Ora. On 1 July it was reported that former X Factor judge Nicole Scherzinger, who has been on both the American and British versions of the show, was entering talks that week to join the show after will.i.am had been "lobbying hard for her to join the panel". However, bosses later claimed they didn't want X Factor castoffs on their show, thus ruling Scherzinger out of the running. On the same day, former member of the Spice Girls and judge on Asia's Got Talent and Superstar, Melanie Chisholm said in an interview that she "would love to do The Voice".

On 14 August 2015, it was announced that Paloma Faith would be replacing Rita Ora on the panel. Upon her appointment on the show, she said “I'm really excited about working with creative people who are there not just to be great singers, but also innovative personalities and performers. I have a long history of helping break artists as in my club nights I booked Kate Nash, Adele and The Noisettes before they hit the big time, and four of my band members have gone on to pursue successful solo careers. I'm really looking forward to getting my teeth into something that cultivates the talents of another person and takes the focus off myself for a bit.”

On 14 August 2015, it was announced that Boy George would be joining the coaching lineup replacing Sir Tom Jones. Charlotte Moore, Controller of BBC One, publicly thanked Jones for "his dedication and commitment to the last four series", whilst Mark Linsey, Controller of Entertainment Commissioning, said that "Jones helped make The Voice UK a success" and thanked him for "his invaluable contribution to the series". George stated he's "he's thrilled and excited to be a coach on The Voice UK. I'm a huge fan of the show and have watched and engaged with it from series one. If I can help someone to win, I will be delighted. What a wonderful opportunity to share my experiences and help someone move forward with their musical career. I can't wait to sit in that chair!"

Following the fourth series final, will.i.am said that he "hopes" to return to the show in 2016 if he was invited back by the BBC. In an interview in NME, Ricky Wilson admitted he had not heard anything from producers about their plans for the show's fifth series: "I don't know if I'd do it again, maybe." With the announcement of Boy George and Paloma Faith joining the show's coaching panel, it was confirmed that both will.i.am and Ricky Wilson would be returning to the show. When discussing his return, Wilson said he's "thrilled to be returning to The Voice as the coach of last season's winning performer, Stevie – but with Paloma Faith and Boy George on board, this series is going to be the hardest one yet. The pressure is definitely on, and I know Will will come out with all generic electronic tablets blazing." This is the final series of The Voice UK to air on BBC One as the show moved to ITV. This is also the final series to feature Marvin Humes as host after 3 series.

== Promotion ==
At the end of the sixth episode of the fourth series, auditions for the 2016 series were advertised. Audition dates in front of the producers were revealed as well, beginning in Belfast on 18 June.

It was announced that the show's blind auditions would be returning to Manchester's dock10 studios in September 2015 on 14 August 2015. The show was taped between 26 and 29 September 2015. Official photos were released on the first day of filming, revealing what the coaches would be wearing during the blind audition process.

== Teams ==
Colour key:

- Winner
- Runner-up
- Third place
- Eliminated in the Live shows
- Eliminated in the Knockouts
- Artist was stolen by another coach at the Battles
- Eliminated in the Battles
- Withdrew

Coach	Top 48 Artists				
will.i.am					
will.i.am	Lydia Lucy	Lyrickal	Lauren Lapsley-Browne	Charley Blue	Tom Rickels
will.i.am	Faheem	Eli Cripps	Theo Llewellyn	~~Aaron Hill~~	Mari Marli
will.i.am	Colleen Gormley	Vivica Jade	Scott and Vicki	Irene Alano-Rhodes	
Boy George					
Boy George	Cody Frost	Vangelis Polydorou	Harry Fisher	Laura Begley	Leighton Jones
Boy George	Chase Morton	Alaric Green	Bradley Waterman	~~Eli Cripps~~	~~Heather Cameron-Hayes~~
Boy George	Melissa Cavanagh	J Sealy	Tobias Robertson	Charley Birkin	
Paloma Faith					
Paloma Faith	Jordan Gray	Heather Cameron-Hayes	Beth Morris	Dwaine Hayden	Deano Boroczky
Paloma Faith	Rick Snowdon	Faith Nelson	Aaron Hill	~~Kevin Simm~~	~~Bradley Waterman~~
Paloma Faith	~~Theo Llewellyn~~	~~Aliesha Lobuczek~~	Steve Devereaux	Megan Reece	JJ Soulx
Ricky Wilson					
Ricky Wilson	Kevin Simm	Jolan	Chloe Castro	Brooklynne Richards	Mia Sylvester
Ricky Wilson	Kagan	Rachel Ann	Aliesha Lobuczek	~~Alaric Green~~	Áine Carroll
Ricky Wilson	Janine Dyer	Dave Barnes	Tom Milner	Efe Udugba	
Note: Italicised names are stolen artists (names struck through within former teams).

== Blind auditions ==
Each coach has the length of the artists' performance to decide if they want that artist on their team. Should two or more coaches want the same artist, then the artist will choose their coach.

Colour key

✔	Coach hit his/her "I WANT YOU" button
	Artist defaulted to this coach's team
	Artist elected to join this coach's team
	Artist eliminated with no coach pressing his or her "I WANT YOU" button
	Artist received an 'All Turn'.

=== Episode 1 (9 January) ===
The series premiere was broadcast on 9 January 2016 from 7.30pm until 9.05pm.

- Group performance: The Voice UK coaches – Medley of "Get On Up" / "You Got the Love" / "Whole Lotta Love"

Order	Artist	Age	Song	Coaches and artists choices			
Order	Artist	Age	Song	will.i.am	Boy George	Paloma	Ricky
1	Beth Morris	25	"Nutbush City Limits"	✔	✔	✔	✔
2	Tom Rickels	22	"Want to Want Me/Love Me like You Do"	✔	✔	—	✔
3	Brooklynne Richards	23	"Cry to Me"	—	✔	—	✔
4	Keri-Ellah	20	"Before He Cheats"	—	—	—	—
5	John Bonham	29	"Can I Play with Madness"	—	—	—	—
6	Reverend John Barron	49	"This Is the Moment"	—	—	—	—
7	Dwaine Hayden	30	"Don't Know Why"	—	✔	✔	—
8	Ryan Willingham	23	"Stars"	—	—	—	—
9	Lyrickal	46	"Virtual Insanity"	✔	—	—	—
10	Áine Carroll	16	"Brokenhearted"	—	✔	✔	✔
11	Bernie Clifton	79	"The Impossible Dream"	—	—	—	—
12	Cody Frost	17	"Lay All Your Love on Me"	—	✔	✔	✔

=== Episode 2 (16 January) ===
This episode aired from 7.45pm until 9.05pm.

Order	Artist	Age	Song	Coaches and artists choices			
Order	Artist	Age	Song	will.i.am	Boy George	Paloma	Ricky
1	Charley Blue	24	"Roll Over Beethoven"	✔	✔	—	✔
2	Chase Morton	30	"If You Want Me to Stay"	—	✔	—	—
3	Divina de Campo	32	"Poor Wandering One"	—	—	—	—
4	Megan Reece	28	"What You Don't Do"	—	✔	✔	—
5	Stevie Calrow	74	"Witchcraft"	—	—	—	—
6	Lydia Lucy	22	"Trouble"	✔	✔	—	✔
7	Janine Dyer	38	"Bridge Over Troubled Water"	—	✔	✔	✔
8	Niamh Breslin	18	"Martha's Harbour"	—	—	—	—
9	Melissa Cavanagh	25	"Blame"	—	✔	—	—
10	Harry Fisher	18	"Let It Go"	—	✔	—	—

=== Episode 3 (23 January) ===
This episode aired from 7.45pm until 9.05pm.

Order	Artist	Age	Song	Coaches and artists choices			
Order	Artist	Age	Song	will.i.am	Boy George	Paloma	Ricky
1	Colet Selwyn	21	"This Ole House"	—	—	—	—
2	Charley Birkin	52	"Rescue Me"	—	✔	—	—
3	Tom Milner	24	"Wait on Me"	—	—	—	✔
4	Stacey Lee	31	"Say Something"	—	—	—	—
5	Cody Lee	17	"Ruby"	—	—	—	—
6	Billy Black	38	"Bad Case of Loving You"	—	—	—	—
7	Lauren Lapsley-Browne	18	"Ain't Nobody"	✔	—	✔	—
8	Olivia Kate Davies	17	"Don't Be So Hard on Yourself"	—	—	—	—
9	Efe Udugba	31	"Jealous"	—	—	—	✔
10	Brooke Waddle	27	"I've Got the Music in Me"	—	—	—	—
11	Deano	27	"You Do Something To Me"	—	—	✔	✔
12	Irene Alano-Rhodes	42	"Wind Beneath My Wings"	✔	—	—	✔

=== Episode 4 (30 January) ===
This episode aired from 7.45pm until 9.10pm.

Order	Artist	Age	Song	Coaches and artists choices			
Order	Artist	Age	Song	will.i.am	Boy George	Paloma	Ricky
1	Aliesha Lobuczek	17	"Break Free"	—	✔	✔	✔
2	The Dublin City Rounders	20-28	"Blank Space"	—	—	—	—
3	Alaric Green	21	"Broken Vow"	✔	—	—	✔
4	Tim Baldwin	20	"I'm Yours"	—	—	—	—
5	Faheem	21	"Marvin Gaye"	✔	—	—	✔
6	Sammy-Jo Evans	17	"Jukebox Blues"	—	—	—	—
7	J Sealy	43	"The First Cut Is the Deepest"	—	✔	—	—
8	Steve Devereaux	60	"The Lady Is a Tramp"	—	—	✔	—
9	Lester Preston	33	"Dancing On My Own"	—	—	—	—
10	Valerie Bacon	70	"You're My World"	—	—	—	—
11	Heather Cameron-Hayes	16	"Life on Mars"	—	✔	—	✔
12	Kevin Simm	35	"Chandelier"	✔	✔	✔	✔

=== Episode 5 (6 February) ===
This episode aired from 7.15pm until 8.30pm.

Order	Artist	Age	Song	Coaches and artists choices			
Order	Artist	Age	Song	will.i.am	Boy George	Paloma	Ricky
1	Vivica Jade	27	"Gravity"	✔	✔	—	✔
2	Marvin The Jazz Man	19	"Sing Sing Sing"	—	—	—	—
3	Chloe Castro	19	"From Eden"	—	—	—	✔
4	Mike Collin	30	"Budapest"	—	—	—	—
5	Gemma Magnusson	32	"Something Inside So Strong"	—	—	—	—
6	Kagan	17	"Take a Bow"	—	—	—	✔
7	Cian Ducrot	18	"One More Night"	—	—	—	—
8	Tobias Robertson	22	"You've Got a Friend in Me"	—	✔	—	—
9	Wett n Wilde	68-74	"Up Where We Belong"	—	—	—	—
10	Dylan Thomas	18	"Like a Rolling Stone"	—	—	—	—
11	Bradley Waterman	19	"Forget You"	—	—	✔	✔
12	Mari Marli	23	"Bang Bang"	✔	—	—	—
13	Vangelis Polydorou	24	"Do You Really Want to Hurt Me"	—	✔	✔	✔

=== Episode 6 (13 February) ===
This episode aired from 7.15pm until 8.30pm.

Order	Artist	Age	Song	Coaches and artists choices			
Order	Artist	Age	Song	will.i.am	Boy George	Paloma	Ricky
1	Mia Sylvester	28	"Ain't No Way"	—	—	—	✔
2	Scott & Vicki	23-24	"Fascination"	✔	—	—	—
3	Paul Phoenix	55	"Chasing Pavements"	—	—	—	—
4	Eli Cripps	28	"Real Love"	—	✔	—	—
5	JJ Soulx *	25	"What's Going On"	—	—	✔	✔
5	Mario Wolfgang	25	"How Deep Is Your Love"	—	—	—	—
7	Theo Llewellyn	26	"Sweet Love"	—	—	✔	—
8	Julie Williams	36	"Love Is a Battlefield"	—	—	—	—
9	Jordan Gray *	26	"Just Like A Woman"	—	—	—	—
10	Mike Berry	73	"True Love Ways"	—	—	—	—
11	Rick Snowdon	29	"I Put A Spell On You"	—	✔	✔	✔
12	Tom Read Wilson	28	"Accentuate The Positive"	—	—	—	—
13	Jolan	21	"Wishing Well"	—	✔	✔	✔

- Although JJ Soulx joined Faith's team in the blind auditions, she later withdrew from the show for personal reasons. As a result, Faith selected Jordan Gray, who had not previously been chosen in the blinds, to take her place for the battle rounds.

=== Episode 7 (20 February) ===
This episode aired from 7.15pm until 8.35pm.

Order	Artist	Age	Song	Coaches and artists choices			
Order	Artist	Age	Song	will.i.am	Boy George	Paloma	Ricky
1	Lisa Wallace	42	"Last Dance"	—	—	—	—
2	Faith Nelson	17	"Earned It"	—	—	✔	✔
3	Rachel Ann	16	"In for the Kill"	✔	—	—N/a	✔
4	Paul Pashley	36	"I Bet You Look Good on the Dancefloor"	—	—	—N/a	—
5	Mike E	42	"You Can Get It If You Really Want"	—	—	—N/a	—
6	Corinne Cooper	22	"Lay Me Down"	—	—	—N/a	—
7	The Land Girls	37-42	"Boogie Woogie Bugle Boy"	—	—	—N/a	—
8	Sam Bloor	19	"Come and Get It"	—	—	—N/a	—
9	Leighton Jones	41	"Heaven Help Us All"	—	✔	—N/a	—
10	Mexican Brothers	32-38	"La Bamba"/"Twist And Shout"	—	—	—N/a	—
11	David Williams	26	"Breakeven"	—	—	—N/a	—
12	Dave Barnes	37	"When a Man Loves a Woman"	—	—	—N/a	✔
13	Rose Farquhar	31	"Anyone Who Had a Heart"	—	—	—N/a	—N/a
14	Laura Begley	22	"Ask"	✔	✔	—N/a	—N/a
15	Kerry O'Dowd	32	"Glitterball"	—	—N/a	—N/a	—N/a
16	Aaron Hill	24	"Never Too Much"	✔	—N/a	—N/a	—N/a
17	Jeffri Ramli	35	"Valerie"	—	—N/a	—N/a	—N/a
18	Colleen Gormley	28	"When You Say Nothing at All"	✔	—N/a	—N/a	—N/a

== Battle rounds ==
The battle rounds will consist of two 2 hour shows on 27 February and 5 March. Like the previous series, each coach is allowed two saves – they may hit their button as many times as they like but may only steal two artists. In a change from previous series, the coaches' chairs will turn around after each performance to face away from the stage so that in the event of steal they turn back around to face the contestants. The First Episode aired from 7.00pm till 9.00pm and the second

Colour key

✔	Coach hit his/her "I WANT YOU" button
	Artist won the Battle and advanced to the Knockouts
	Artist lost the Battle but was stolen by another coach and advances to the Knockouts
	Artist lost the Battle and was eliminated

Episode	Coach	Order	Winner	Song	Loser	'Steal' result			
Episode	Coach	Order	Winner	Song	Loser	will.i.am	George	Paloma	Ricky
Episode 1 (27 February)	will.i.am	1	Lydia Lucy	"Cryin'"	Irene Alano-Rhodes	—N/a	—	—	—
Episode 1 (27 February)	Paloma Faith	2	Dwaine Hayden	"Kiss Me"	Aliesha Lobuczek	—	—	—N/a	✔
Episode 1 (27 February)	Boy George	3	Harry Fisher	"I Just Can't Stop Loving You"	Charley Birkin	—	—N/a	—	—
Episode 1 (27 February)	Ricky Wilson	4	Jolan	"Beat Surrender"	Efe Udugba	—	—	—	—N/a
Episode 1 (27 February)	will.i.am	5	Charley Blue	"Black Magic"	Scott and Vicki	—N/a	—	—	—
Episode 1 (27 February)	Ricky Wilson	6	Chloe Castro	"Hope There's Someone"	Alaric Green	—	✔	—	—N/a
Episode 1 (27 February)	will.i.am	7	Faheem	"Living for the City"	Aaron Hill	—N/a	✔	✔	—
Episode 1 (27 February)	Boy George	8	Laura Begley	"Love Will Tear Us Apart"	Tobias Robertson	—	—N/a	—	—
Episode 1 (27 February)	Paloma Faith	9	Jordan Gray	"This Woman's Work"	Theo Llewelyn	✔	__	—N/a	—
Episode 1 (27 February)	Ricky Wilson	10	Brooklynne Richards	"Tears Dry on Their Own"	Tom Milner	—	—	—	—N/a
Episode 1 (27 February)	Paloma Faith	11	Rick Snowdon	"Something's Got a Hold on Me" / "I'm a Man"	Bradley Waterman	—	✔	—N/a	—
Episode 1 (27 February)	Boy George	12	Cody Frost	"Nothing Compares 2 U"	Heather Cameron-Hayes	—	—N/a	✔	—
Episode 2 (5 March)	Paloma Faith	1	Faith Nelson	"Spotlight"	Kevin Simm	—	Team Full	Team Full	✔
Episode 2 (5 March)	Boy George	2	Chase Morton	"I Can See Clearly Now"	J Sealy	—	Team Full	Team Full	Team Full
Episode 2 (5 March)	will.i.am	3	Lauren Lapsley-Browne	"Love Shack"	Vivica Jade	—N/a	Team Full	Team Full	Team Full
Episode 2 (5 March)	Ricky Wilson	4	Kagan	"King"	Dave Barnes	—	Team Full	Team Full	Team Full
Episode 2 (5 March)	Boy George	5	Vangelis Polydorou	"One"	Melissa Cavanagh	—	Team Full	Team Full	Team Full
Episode 2 (5 March)	Ricky Wilson	6	Mia Sylvester	"Ain't No Other Man"	Janine Dyer	—	Team Full	Team Full	Team Full
Episode 2 (5 March)	will.i.am	7	Tom Rickels	"Everything She Wants"	Colleen Gormley	—N/a	Team Full	Team Full	Team Full
Episode 2 (5 March)	Paloma Faith	8	Deano Boroczky	"I Try"	Megan Reece	—	Team Full	Team Full	Team Full
Episode 2 (5 March)	Boy George	9	Leighton Jones	"If I Were Your Woman"	Eli Cripps	✔	Team Full	Team Full	Team Full
Episode 2 (5 March)	will.i.am	10	Lyrickal	"Like I Can"	Mari Marli	Team Full	Team Full	Team Full	Team Full
Episode 2 (5 March)	Ricky Wilson	11	Rachel Ann	"This Is The Last Time"	Áine Carroll	Team Full	Team Full	Team Full	Team Full
Episode 2 (5 March)	Paloma Faith	12	Beth Morris	"Crazy"	Steve Devereaux	Team Full	Team Full	Team Full	Team Full

== Knockout rounds ==
The Knockout rounds aired on 12 and 20 March 2016. Teams of 8 after the battles were stripped down to 3 for the live shows. First episode aired from 7.30pm until 8.45pm and second episode aired from 7.45pm until 9.00pm.

Colour key:

Artist won the Knockouts and advanced to the Live shows
Artist lost the Knockouts and was eliminated

Episode	Order	Coach	Artist	Song	Result
Episode 1 (12 March)	1	Paloma Faith	Beth Morris	"Jumpin' Jack Flash"	Advanced
Episode 1 (12 March)	2	Paloma Faith	Deano Boroczky	"Georgia on My Mind"	Eliminated
Episode 1 (12 March)	3	Paloma Faith	Jordan Gray	"Real Gone Kid"	Advanced
Episode 1 (12 March)	4	Paloma Faith	Rick Snowdon	"Watch Over You"	Eliminated
Episode 1 (12 March)	5	Paloma Faith	Aaron Hill	"Goin' Up Yonder"	Eliminated
Episode 1 (12 March)	6	Paloma Faith	Heather Cameron-Hayes	"Holding Out for a Hero"	Advanced
Episode 1 (12 March)	7	Paloma Faith	Dwaine Hayden	"Knocks Me Off My Feet"	Eliminated
Episode 1 (12 March)	8	Paloma Faith	Faith Nelson	"Runnin' (Lose It All)"	Eliminated
Episode 1 (12 March)	1	Ricky Wilson	Jolan	"Never Tear Us Apart"	Advanced
Episode 1 (12 March)	2	Ricky Wilson	Brooklynne Richards	"Think"	Eliminated
Episode 1 (12 March)	3	Ricky Wilson	Aliesha Lobuczek	"Unconditionally"	Eliminated
Episode 1 (12 March)	4	Ricky Wilson	Chloe Castro	"Alive"	Advanced
Episode 1 (12 March)	5	Ricky Wilson	Rachel Ann	"Come as You Are"	Eliminated
Episode 1 (12 March)	6	Ricky Wilson	Kagan	"Hotline Bling"	Eliminated
Episode 1 (12 March)	7	Ricky Wilson	Mia Sylvester	"Who's Lovin' You"	Eliminated
Episode 1 (12 March)	8	Ricky Wilson	Kevin Simm	"Wings"	Advanced
Episode 2 (20 March)	1	Boy George	Alaric Green	"Unchained Melody"	Eliminated
Episode 2 (20 March)	2	Boy George	Laura Begley	"Sweet Disposition"	Eliminated
Episode 2 (20 March)	3	Boy George	Harry Fisher	"Hello"	Advanced
Episode 2 (20 March)	4	Boy George	Bradley Waterman	"Sonnentanz (Sun Don't Shine)"	Eliminated
Episode 2 (20 March)	5	Boy George	Leighton Jones	"Feel Like Makin' Love"	Eliminated
Episode 2 (20 March)	6	Boy George	Vangelis Polydorou	"Always on My Mind"	Advanced
Episode 2 (20 March)	7	Boy George	Chase Morton	"If You Let Me Stay"	Eliminated
Episode 2 (20 March)	8	Boy George	Cody Frost	"Another Brick in the Wall"	Advanced
Episode 2 (20 March)	1	will.i.am	Lydia Lucy	"I Knew You Were Trouble"	Advanced
Episode 2 (20 March)	2	will.i.am	Faheem	"We Don't Have to Take Our Clothes Off"	Eliminated
Episode 2 (20 March)	3	will.i.am	Charley Blue	"Frisky"	Eliminated
Episode 2 (20 March)	4	will.i.am	Theo Llewellyn	"Photograph"	Eliminated
Episode 2 (20 March)	5	will.i.am	Tom Rickels	"Problem"	Eliminated
Episode 2 (20 March)	6	will.i.am	Eli Cripps	"Used to Love U"	Eliminated
Episode 2 (20 March)	7	will.i.am	Lauren Lapsley-Browne	"Release Me"	Advanced
Episode 2 (20 March)	8	will.i.am	Lyrickal	"Read All About It"	Advanced

== Live shows ==
The live shows began on 26 March 2016.

=== Results summary ===
Team’s colour key
Team Will
Team George
Team Paloma
Team Ricky

Result's colour key
Artist given 'Fast Pass' by their coach and did not face the public vote
Artist received the fewest votes and was eliminated
Artist won the competition
Artist withdrew from the competition

Weekly results per artist
Contestant	Week 1	Week 2	Week 3	
Contestant	Week 1	Week 2	Round 1	Round 2
Kevin Simm	Fast Pass	Safe	Safe	Winner (week 3)
Jolan	Safe	Safe	Safe	Runner-up (week 3)
Cody Frost	Fast Pass	Safe	Eliminated	Eliminated (week 3)
Lydia Lucy	Safe	Safe	Eliminated	Eliminated (week 3)
Heather Cameron-Hayes	Safe	Eliminated	Eliminated (week 2)	
Jordan Gray	Fast Pass	Eliminated	Eliminated (week 2)	
Lyrickal	Fast Pass	Eliminated	Eliminated (week 2)	
Vangelis Polydorou	Safe	Eliminated	Eliminated (week 2)	
Lauren Lapsley-Browne	Eliminated	Eliminated (week 1)		
Harry Fisher	Eliminated	Eliminated (week 1)		
Beth Morris	Withdrew (week 1)			
Chloe Castro	Withdrew (week 1)			

=== Live show details ===
==== Week 1: Quarter-final (26 March) ====
The first part aired from 7.00pm until 8.40pm, and the second part from 8.50pm until 9.20pm.

- Coaches performance: "Get It On"
- Guest performances: Stevie McCrorie ("My Heart Never Lies") and Years & Years ("Desire")

Order	Coach	Artist	Song	Result
1	will.i.am	Lydia Lucy	"Somebody Else's Guy"	Advanced
2	will.i.am	Lyrickal	"Just Like a Child"	Fast pass
3	will.i.am	Lauren Lapsley-Browne	"Dreamer"	Eliminated
4	Paloma Faith	Heather Cameron-Hayes	"Stitches"	Advanced
5	Paloma Faith	Jordan Gray	"Shake It Out"	Fast pass
6	Ricky Wilson	Kevin Simm	"Kissing You"	Fast pass
7	Ricky Wilson	Jolan	"Yes"	Advanced
8	Boy George	Harry Fisher	"Space Oddity"	Eliminated
9	Boy George	Vangelis Polydorou	"Here Comes the Rain Again"	Advanced
10	Boy George	Cody Frost	"Ordinary World"	Fast pass

On 26 March 2016, it was announced that Chloe Castro and Beth Morris had withdrawn from the competition due to health and personal reasons, respectively. They were not replaced and the elimination went ahead as normal.

==== Week 2: Semi-final (2 April) ====
This episode aired from 7.00pm until 9.05pm.

- Guest performances: Zara Larsson featuring Tinie Tempah ("Lush Life"/"Girls Like") and Birdy ("Wild Horses")
- Group performances: Team Ricky with Ricky Wilson ("The Power of Love"), Team Boy George with Boy George ("Victims"), Team Paloma with Paloma Faith ("Piece of My Heart") and Team Will with will.i.am ("Good Times"/"Rapper's Delight")

With the eliminations of Heather Cameron-Hayes and Jordan Gray, Paloma Faith no longer has any artists remaining on her team.

Order	Coach	Artist	Song	Result
1	Ricky Wilson	Kevin Simm	"Rolling in the Deep"	Advanced
2	will.i.am	Lyrickal	"See You Again"	Eliminated
3	Paloma Faith	Heather Cameron-Hayes	"Sorry"	Eliminated
4	Boy George	Cody Frost	"The Chain"	Advanced
5	will.i.am	Lydia Lucy	"I'll Be There"	Advanced
6	Paloma Faith	Jordan Gray	"Dancing in the Dark"	Eliminated
7	Boy George	Vangelis Polydorou	"Beautiful"	Eliminated
8	Ricky Wilson	Jolan	"Purple Rain"	Advanced

==== Week 3: Final (9 April) ====
This episode aired from 7.00pm until 9.00pm.

- Guest performances: Meghan Trainor ("No") and Shawn Mendes ("Stitches")

Order	Coach	Artist	First song	Order	Second song (duet)	Order	Winner's song	Result
1	Ricky Wilson	Jolan	"I Heard It Through The Grapevine"	5	"Are You Gonna Go My Way" (with Ricky Wilson)	9	"All You Good Friends"	Runner-up
2	will.i.am	Lydia Lucy	"No One"	8	"Boys & Girls" (with will.i.am)	N/A	N/A (already eliminated)	Eliminated
3	Ricky Wilson	Kevin Simm	"Stay"	7	"Mr. Brightside" (with Ricky Wilson)	10	"All You Good Friends"	Winner
4	Boy George	Cody Frost	"Mad World"	6	"Imagine" (with Boy George)	N/A	N/A (already eliminated)	Eliminated

== Reception ==
=== Ratings ===
Series 5 of The Voice UK launched to an audience of 7.87 million viewers, down over 1 million viewers on Series 4. However, ratings remained steady until they then took the usual dip as tougher competition was faced from ITV and Ant and Dec's Saturday Night Takeaway. Series 5 has the lowest average rating of any The Voice UK series for its Blind Auditions.

Episode	Date	Official ratings (in millions)	BBC One weekly rank
Blind auditions 1	9 January	7.87	7
Blind auditions 2	16 January	7.03	11
Blind auditions 3	23 January	7.42	10
Blind auditions 4	30 January	7.69	8
Blind auditions 5	6 February	7.41	10
Blind auditions 6	13 February	7.11	9
Blind auditions 7	20 February	6.57	11
Battle rounds 1	27 February	6.33	11
Battle rounds 2	5 March	6.05	10
Knockout rounds 1	12 March	6.18	8
Knockout rounds 2	20 March	6.73	8
Live show 1	26 March	5.52	10
Live results 1	26 March	5.10	15
Live show 2	2 April	5.22	12
Live Final	9 April	5.12	13
Series average	2016	6.49	10 (10.2)

=== Controversy ===
==== Tom Jones' exit ====
On 14 August 2015, it was announced that Boy George would be joining the show alongside Paloma Faith, will.i.am and Ricky Wilson. Later that day, Sir Tom Jones posted a message to his fans on Facebook which said the following: "About The Voice UK: In good faith, as part of the team, I'd put the time in my schedule to be involved in Series 5, as I’ve done so for the last 4 years. I’ve supported the show and the BBC since the beginning. I was told yesterday, with no consultation or conversation of any kind, that I would not be returning. Having been through plenty of transformations throughout the years, I support and admire creative change. But being informed, as a matter of duty and respect, is an important part of creative relationships. This sub-standard behaviour from the executives is very disappointing. I will always admire the courage of the performers who participate in the show, as well as all the production staff who worked tirelessly to make a great family viewing experience for the audience at home. I wish the show well."

This sparked outrage with the show's viewers, with many of them venting their frustration via Twitter. Will.i.am, and hosts Marvin Humes and Emma Willis also expressed their disappointment during interviews. The BBC responded to this backlash by stating "The final decision on the coaches line up for series five of The Voice was only taken on Wednesday [12 August] and Tom's team was informed early yesterday [13 August] morning. We then announced it to the press so that it didn't leak. This has been the same every year and no role was ever promised. The chemistry between the coaches is extremely important and that they all represent different musical genres and we feel the new line up is exactly what the show needs. We look forward to seeing Tom on BBC One in October with his Children in Need concert. Tom hasn't been axed or fired from The Voice. He was out of contract once series four ended in April and that contract has not been renewed."

On 17 August, George posted the following the message on Twitter: "I have absolute respect for Tom Jones. The man is an absolute legend. Huge fan!" The following day, Jones uploaded a new song on his YouTube channel entitled "Why Don't You Love Me Like You Used To Do?", with the accompanying message on Facebook: "This is a song I recently recorded, just happens to fit the bill! I'd like to thank everyone who's been so kind to me lately, except for those few, this is dedicated to them".

==== Technical issues ====
Around 40,000 people applied to be on this series of The Voice. A month before the blind auditions were due to begin, the 200 artists that would be auditioning in front of the coaches were contacted and told that they were not successful, leaving no one to actually be performing on the show. The producers noticed the error hours later and had to contact all the singers to inform them that they would still be performing on the show. A spokesperson for the show said "We can confirmed this unfortunate incident was caused by a technical glitch and was rectified immediately."

==== Faith and George ====
On 30 September 2015 The Mirror reported that the two new coaches, Faith and George, had been involved in a heated pitch for an artist they both turned around for on the third day of auditions (Monday 28th). The argument arose when Faith pretended to snore and fall asleep during George's pitch. George responded by saying "You said you weren't going to be bitchy and you're being bitchy. You've probably got PMT or something, you were extremely rude. If you choose Paloma she will probably fall asleep while you sing." On a separate occasion, he had told an artist that they had more number one hits in America than Faith did as well as telling her "don't give it if you can't take it". Fellow coach will.i.am later commented "that was super intense, I don't think I want to go backstage anymore, I'll stay out here instead." A spokesperson for the show said that the row arose because "all four coaches are fighting hard to get the best talent on their teams. Competition and banter may be lively on camera but professional rivalries are left at the studio doors at the end of every recording. We think viewers are going to love the genuine passion that our new line-up brings to The Voice in 2016." In the early hours of the morning on 30 September, George posted a photo of himself and Faith on Twitter with the caption "Ha. Love you Paloma Faith it's just 'banter-mime!", to which Faith replied "[the] feeling is mutual baby!". The pitch in question was over former Liberty X singer and the season's eventual winner, Kevin Simm, which aired during episode 4 of the Blind Auditions.

==== Contestants pulling out ====
Over the course of the series, a total of three contestants pulled out from the competition for various reasons. The first instance of this was when JJ Soulx pulled out after her blind audition for "personal reasons", leading her to be replaced by formerly eliminated contestant Jordan Gray. However, the issue was again raised when two contestants – Beth Morris and Chloe Castro – pulled out before the quarter-final only hours before it was due to be aired. Viewers complained about this as both had been considered favourites to win, and their departure was put very abruptly. Though it was revealed Castro quit for health reasons, many online tabloids and newspapers speculated that Morris had left due to drug allegations, something she had kept hidden from producers.

Morris revealed that the drug allegations were in fact true, stating to Digital Spy, "Two years ago I realised I had a problem with drugs. I made the decision myself to seek treatment and checked into the Priory clinic. It gave me strength and helped me face the world. It changed me for the better. But addiction is tough. And I am sorry to say that I have relapsed on a few occasions since I left. When this has happened I have immediately sought help. I'm truly sorry I've let everyone down but I'm determined to put this behind me." Once released to the producers of the show, both them and Morris agreed that the best course of action would be to withdraw from the competition.
