= Cody Frost =

British Singer Songwriter

- Origin: Burnley, UK
- Genre: alternative rock
- Occupations: Musician; Songwriter; Tattoo artist
- Years active: 2016–present
- Member of: Cody Frost and The Sweethearts
- Website: https://www.cody-frost.com/

Cody Frost is a British singer/songwriter who writes and performs alternative music.

== Background ==
Frost's mother was also a singer, and performed in an ABBA tribute band. Frost attended Blessed Trinity Roman Catholic College in Burnley, UK, for secondary education.

Before the release of their mixtape "Teeth" in 2022, Frost completed an apprenticeship as a tattoo artist. They have also worked at a bar in the past.

== Music career ==
In 2015, Frost was a contestant on The Voice UK series 5, which was aired starting January 2016. They performed a cover of "Ordinary World" and were eliminated in the final round of live shows.

In 2021, they began releasing their own music, releasing the EP "It's Not Real" that year.

In May 2022, they released a mixtape, "Teeth".

In November 2024, they released a second EP, titled "Anatomy".

In November 2025, they released their third EP, "Mechaeval".

== Personal life ==
Frost has ADHD, a condition which is a key lyric in their song "Chaos".

Frost is non-binary, and lists they/she/he pronouns on their Instagram page.
