= Jolan (singer) =

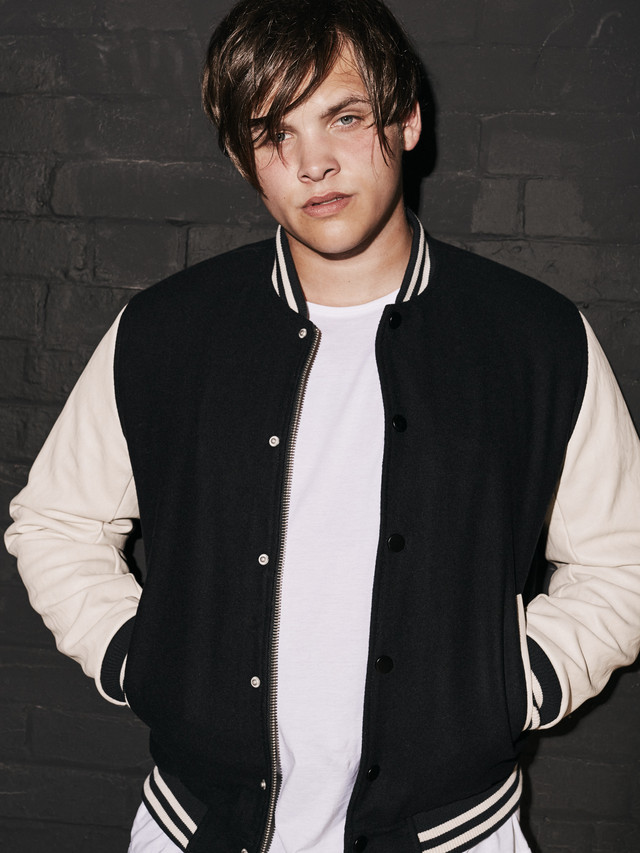

Background information
- Born: Jolan Gidney-Craigen; 12 November 1993 (age 32); Bolton, England
- Genres: Rock, Soul, Pop
- Occupation: Singer–songwriter
- Instruments: Vocals, guitar, piano, bass guitar
- Years active: 2014, 2016–present

Jolan Gidney-Craigen (born 12 November 1993), mononymously known as Jolan, is an English singer. He is best known for placing second in the fifth series of The Voice UK.

== Early life ==
Jolan Gidney-Craigen was born on 12 November 1993 in Bolton, England. His mother died in 2014, which convinced him to re-audition for The Voice UK in 2016.

== Career ==
=== 2014–16: The Voice UK ===
Jolan had previously performed a blind audition in the third series of The Voice UK, singing Labrinth and Emeli Sandé's "Beneath Your Beautiful", but failed to make any of the coaches turn for him and he was therefore eliminated straight away. In 2016, he auditioned again, performing Terence Trent D'Arby's "Wishing Well". Three out of the four coaches – Boy George, Paloma Faith and Ricky Wilson – turned for him and he elected to join Team Ricky. He went on to reach the final where he was defeated by Kevin Simm, who was also on Wilson's team.

The Voice UK 2016 performances and results
Show	Song choice	Original artist	Result
Audition	"Wishing Well"	Terence Trent D'Arby	Advanced; joined Ricky Wilson's team
Battle Rounds	"Beat Surrender" (against Efe Udugba)	The Jam	Won the battle; advanced
Knockouts	"Never Tear Us Apart"	INXS	Advanced
Live Show 1	"Yes"	McAlmont & Butler	Advanced
Live Show 2	"Purple Rain"	Prince	Advanced
Live Show 2	"The Power of Love" (with Ricky Wilson and Kevin Simm)	Huey Lewis and the News	Advanced
Live Show 3	"Heard It Through The Grapevine"	Marvin Gaye	Runner-up
Live Show 3	"Are You Gonna Go My Way" (with Ricky Wilson)	Lenny Kravitz	Runner-up
Live Show 3	"All You Good Friends"	Kevin Simm	Runner-up

=== 2016–: Later career ===
Following The Voice UK, Jolan announced that he would be continuing his music career and had gone out to find a record label.
