= Johnny Dole & the Scabs =

- Origin: Sydney, New South Wales, Australia
- Genre: Punk rock
- Years active: 1976–1979, 2013
- Labels: Aberrant Records, Brain Salad Surgery, Buckwheat Headlock Productions, Murder Punk Inc, Shock Records
- Past members: Terry Walsh (Johnny Dole); Peter Mullany; Dave Berry; Greg Morris; Phil Walsh; Mike Couples; Paul Cosgrove

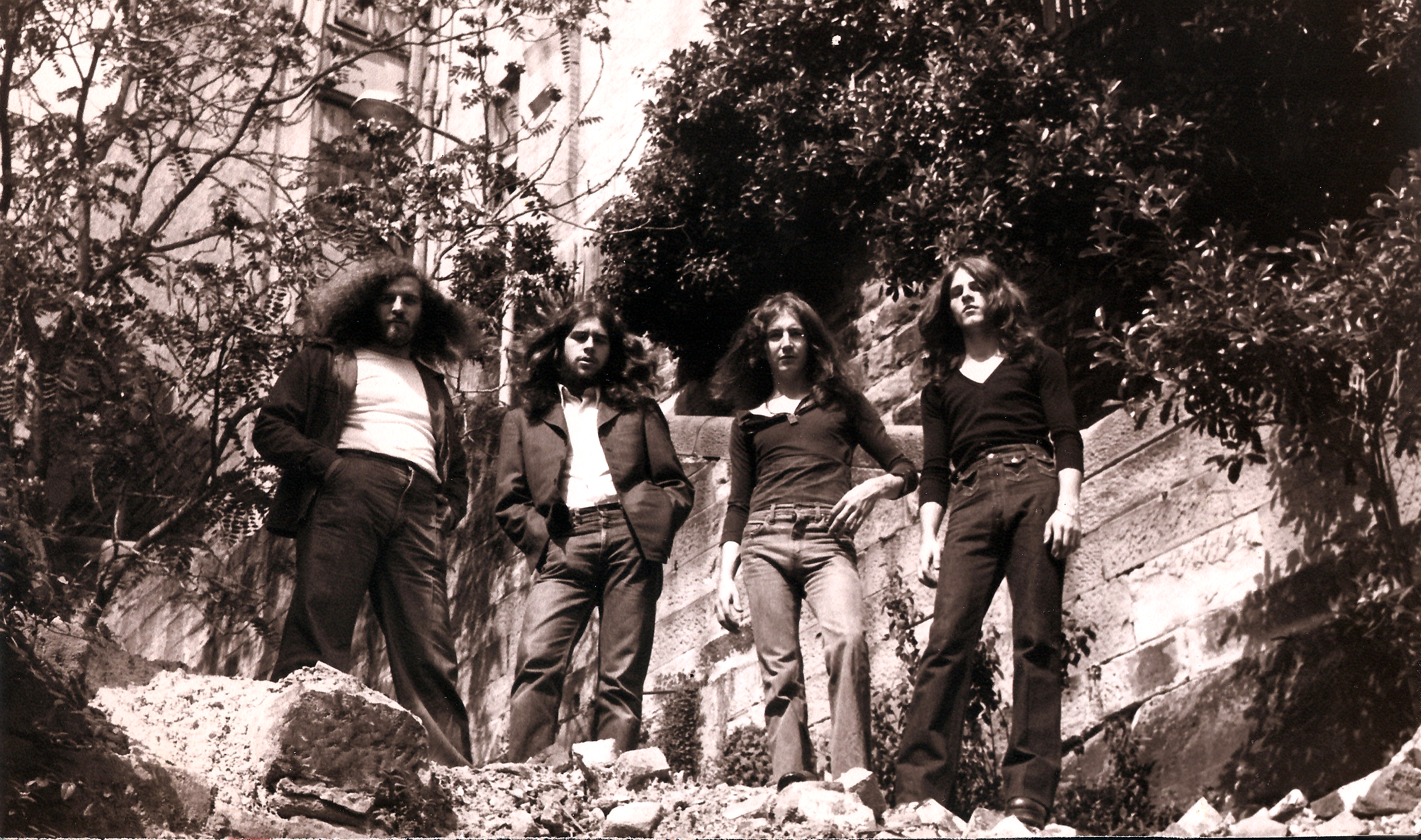
Johnny Dole & The Scabs

Johnny Dole & the Scabs were an Australian punk rock band formed in 1976 by Terry Walsh (a.k.a. Johnny Dole) on lead vocals, Dave Berry on bass guitar and vocals, Peter Mullany on guitar and Greg Morris on drums and vocals. They were one of the first punk rock bands from Australia. Thee band disbanded in mid-1979 before briefly reuniting in 2013. A compilation album, Scab Animal 1977, was released in 1996. Terry Walsh died on 9 August 1987, aged 33.

== History ==
The four founding members of Johnny Dole & the Scabs had all been members of a Sydney-based covers band, the Strays. By early 1977 that group were playing some original material including punk rock tracks. Their guitarist, Mark Wong See, left and Johnny Dole & the Scabs were formed by Terry Walsh (a.k.a. Johnny Dole) on lead vocals, Dave Berry on bass guitar and vocals, Peter Mullany on guitar and Greg Morris on drums and vocals. Most of the group's original tracks were co-written by Mullany and Walsh.

Punk rock was not welcomed at most venues, so they approached ones that supported the genre. George Kringus, the manager of Radio Birdman, booked them at the Oxford Funhouse, Taylor Square, Sydney, with their first gig on 15 April 1977. According to Australian musicologist, Ian McFarlane, "Alongside the Hellcats and Johnny Dole and the Scabs, Psycho-Surgeons were one of the first bands to become associated with the scene that grew up around the Oxford Funhouse, the legendary venue in inner-city Sydney."

Ray Walsh, Terry's brother, managed them. He had gathered contacts whilst a professional wrestler, under the stage name, Butcher Brown, and secured interviews with newspapers, including The Daily Mirror, The Daily Telegraph and The Sydney Morning Herald. A recording session with Sydney radio station, 2JJ's producer, Keith Walker led to interviews and songs being played. An interview on Channel 9's TV programme, A Current Affair, with Mike Carlton aired in January 1978. They supported the Saints at the Refectory, Sydney University.

Peita Letchford, a student at the Australian Film, Television and Radio School (AFTRS), made a music video for their track, "Aggro". It was shot in Woolloomooloo in old factories, due to be demolished, it was not shown publicly at that time. Letchford died of cancer in the late 1990s, but the video was located in the AFTRS archives 30 years after it was made.

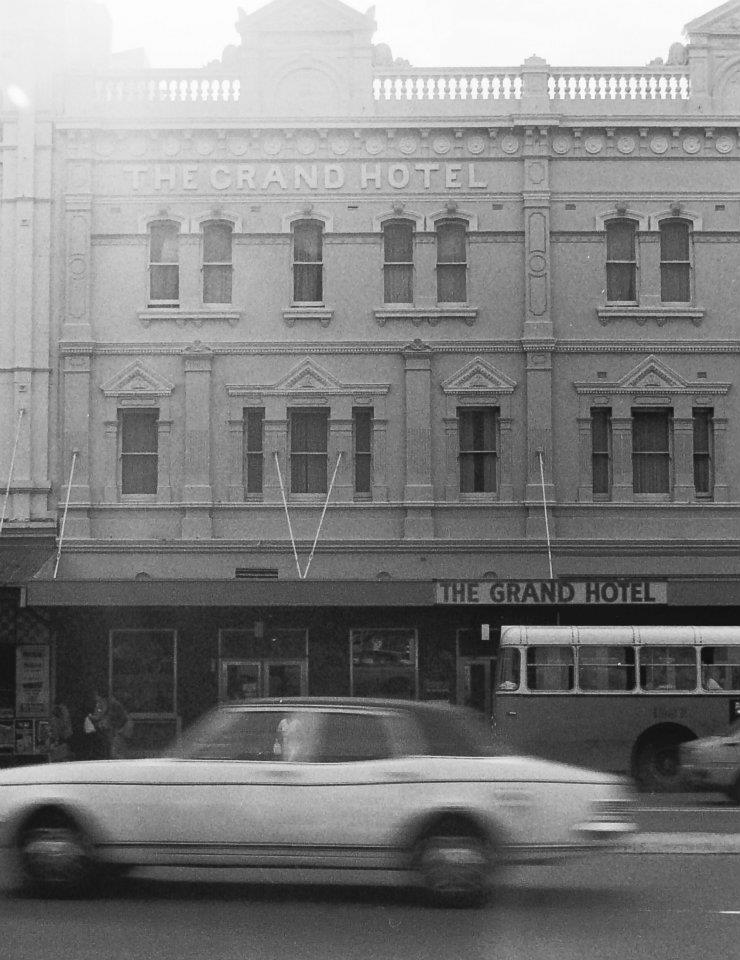
Grand Hotel, Broadway, Sydney, circa 1970s

After the closure of the Oxford Funhouse Johnny Dole & the Scabs approached publicans at other pubs. The owner of the Grand Hotel, Broadway agreed to let them use the back room. On 16 September 1977, Johnny Dole & the Scabs opened the venue. Other bands which played there including Rocks, Tommy & the Dipsticks, Blackrunner (with Danny Rumour later a member of Sekret Sekret and then the Cruel Sea), Shock Treatment, Society Blitz, Subversion, Psychosurgeons, the Press, Mental As Anything, the Mangrove Boogie Kings, and World War IV.

Johnny Dole & the Scabs' last gig with the original line-up was at the Bondi Lifesaver, Bondi Junction, on 9 February 1978, supporting Cold Chisel. Not long after Greg Morris was asked to leave, and Dave Berry also left. The band did not last much longer but did a few gigs with new personnel. Dole and Mullany later joined with Tommy & the Dipsticks to form the Crooked Hearts.

After the Crooked Hearts, Mullany formed Sekret Sekret with David Virgin and released a number of singles. He is no longer involved in punk rock and lives in the north coast. Dave Berry moved down the south coast and was playing in a covers band, the Nashberries. After Johnny Dole & the Scabs, Morris joined another punk band, Rocks, and soon after recorded the EP You'r So Boring. Later he played in a covers band, Mad Cow Party Band. Terry Walsh died on 9 August 1987, aged 33.

In 1997 the group issued a compilation, Scab Animal 1977, via Brain Salad Surgery. Eight tracks had been recorded at ABC Studios 201 in 1977 with Keith Walker producing. Col Gray of Vicious Kitten, described the band as, "Australia's answer to the Pistols... [providing] more a backlash against established and commercially dominant rock artists... [the tracks] sound vital and relevant, oozing with energy and conviction. Eight songs of raw edged aggression, as menacing and snarling as any other punk sound around at that time. The songs are an exercise in hi-energy, structurally sound, with copious amounts of originality in the song writing department." Bonus material for the CD version include four live tracks and an unlisted track providing various radio interviews.

== Reunion ==
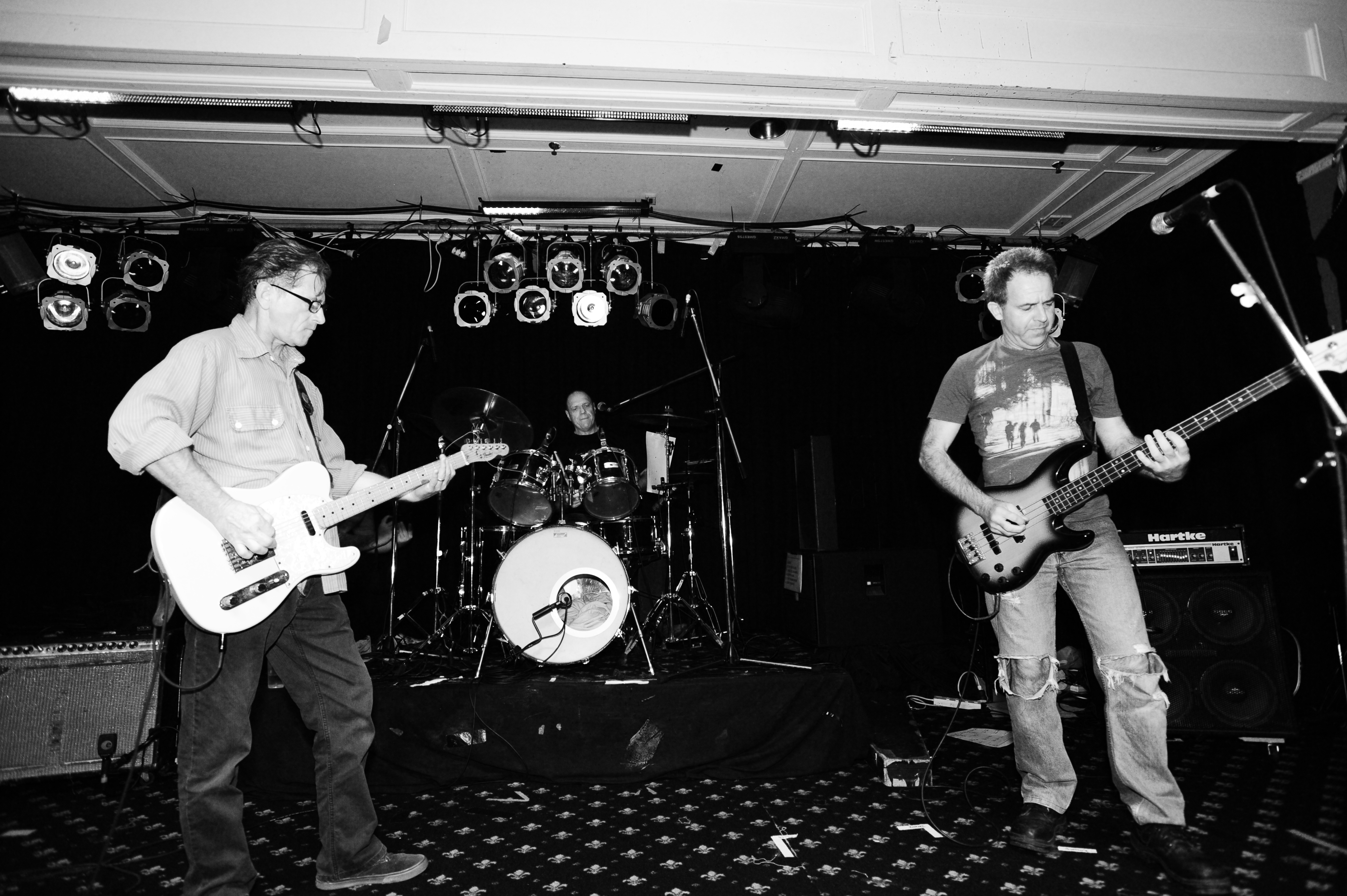
Reunion Gig Bald Faced Stag Hotel Leichhardt 2013

With the release of a documentary, Distorted: Reflections on Early Sydney Punk (2013), by Des Devlin (of Sekret Sekret), the surviving members of the original line-up: Berry, Morris and Mullany, reformed for a one-off gig. Billed as A Grand Night of Original Punk, on 19 April 2013, at the Bald Faced Stag Hotel, Leichhardt. It was the first time they had appeared together on stage since 1978. Other bands that had played at the Grand Hotel in the late 1970s also performed: Tommy & the Dipsticks, Rejex, the Urban Guerillas, the Crooked Hearts and Rocks.

== Former Members ==
- Terry Walsh (a.k.a. Johnny Dole) – lead vocals (1976 - 1979)
- Peter Mullany – guitar (1976 - 1979)
- Dave Berry – bass guitar, vocals (1976 - 1979)
- Greg Morris – drums, vocals (1977 - 1978)
- Phil Walsh - drums (1978)
- Mike Couples - drums (1978)
- Paul Cosgrove - drums (1978 - 1979)

== Albums ==
- Scab Animal 1977 (CD, 1996) – Brain Salad Surgery (BSS05)
  - Scab Animal 1977 (re-issue LP Album, 1997) – Buckwheat Headlock Productions (BHP 03)

== Original Songs ==
- "Aggro"* (Walsh/Mullany)
- "All That's Going On"* (Walsh/Mullany)
- "Blow My Nose"* (Berry)
- "Getting Desperate" (Walsh/Mullany)
- "Halfwit Rock 'N' Roll" (Walsh/Mullany)
- "Hurts My Brain" (Walsh/Mullany)
- "I Don't Wanna Work" (Walsh/Mullany/Berry/Morris)
- "Little Lord Punk"* (Walsh/Mullany)
- "Living Like An Animal"* (Walsh/Mullany)
- "Lucky Country"* (Walsh/Mullany)
- "Psycho Analyst"* (Walsh/Mullany)
- "Stuff Your Rules"* (Walsh/Mullany)

(*Recorded at ABC Studio 221 Forbes Street, Darlinghurst NSW Australia produced and engineered by Keith Walker – released on both Scab Animal 1977 LP and CD)

== Known Performances ==
- Bondi Lifesaver - Bondi Junction - 1 gig supporting Cold Chisel
- Chequers Night Club – Town Hall – 1 gig as Johnny Dole & the Strays, asked to leave after one set
- Governor Bourke Hotel - Camperdown - 2 gigs
- Journey's End Wine Bar – Woolloomooloo – 1 gig
- The Last Resort - Darlinghurst - 1 gig
- Manly Vale Hotel - Manly Vale – 1 gig supporting Karl Taylor & Huntress
- Refectory, Sydney University – 1 gig supporting The Saints
- Stage Door Tavern – Central – 1 gig
- Stagecoach Tavern – Sydney – 3 gigs as the Strays
- The Grand Hotel – Broadway – 21 gigs
- The Oxford Funhouse – Taylor Square – 4 gigs
- The Paris Theatre – Sydney – 6 gigs
- Bald Faced Stag Hotel - Leichhardt (Reunion gig)
