= David Virgin =

Musician, songwriter and producer

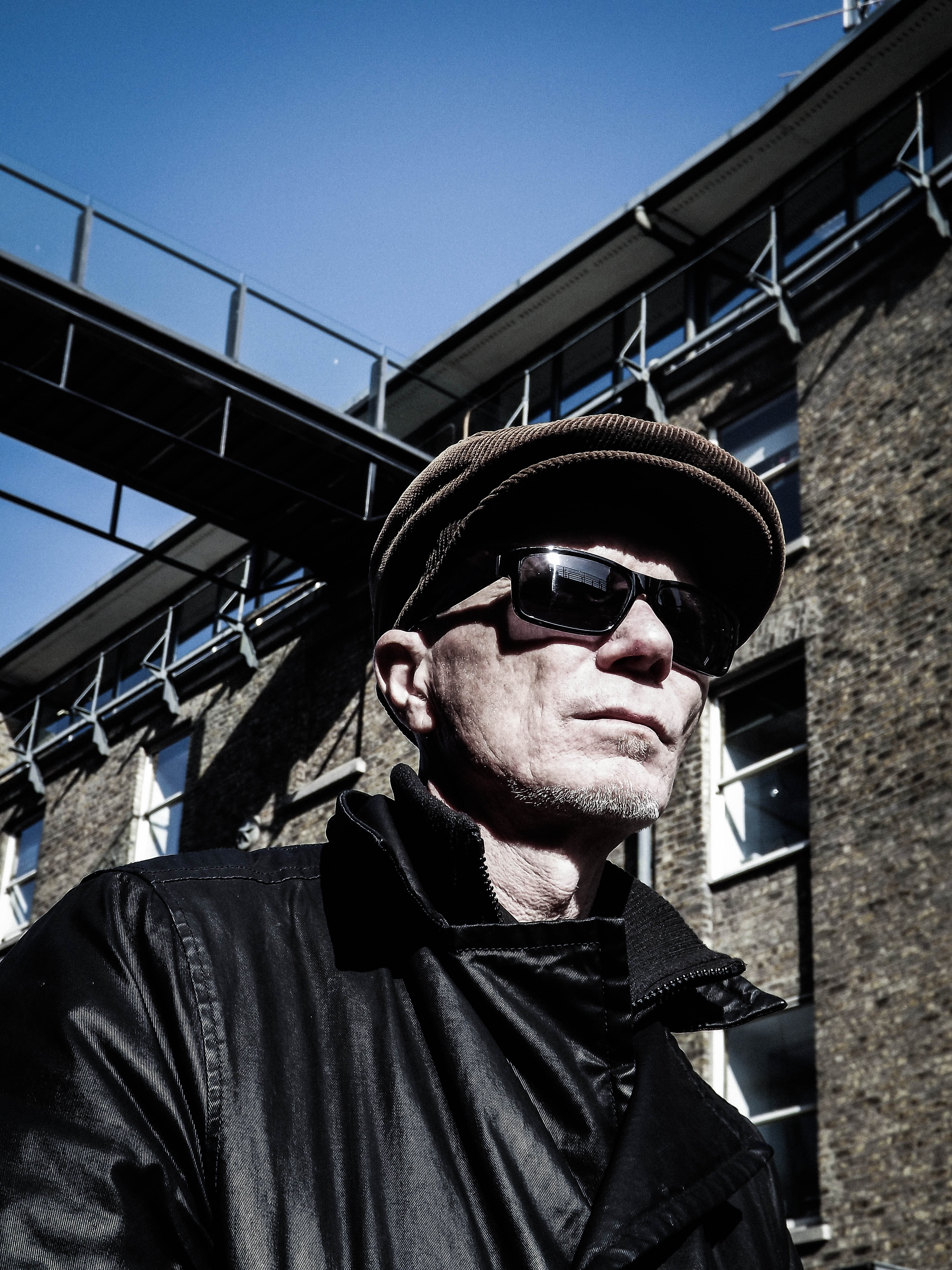
- Virgin in 2014

Background information
- Also known as: David Verjin
- Born: David Anthony Healy; 14 January 1962 (age 64); Dublin, Ireland
- Origin: Sydney, Australia
- Genres: Industrial; classic rock; alt-country; psychedelic; punk
- Occupations: Musician; writer; record producer
- Instruments: Vocals; guitar; bass guitar
- Years active: 1978–present
- Labels: Mute; Basilisk; Waterfront; Industrial; Side Effects; The Grey Area; Universal; Beardfire; EMI
- Formerly of: SPK; Sekret Sekret; Broken Toys; Virgin & Rumour
- Website: beardfire.com/pages/artists/david_virgin.html

David Anthony Healy (born 14 January 1962), who performs as David Virgin, is an Irish-born Australian musician, songwriter and record producer. In the 1980s he was a member of punk industrial noise group SPK, and later formed a post-punk band, Sekret Sekret. He was active in the 1990s and 2000s touring Australia and Europe. He performed and recorded both as a solo artist and as a member of numerous bands. Virgin is the owner of Beardfire Recording Studios in Dublin, Ireland where he has produced music for artists including Ailsha, All The Queen's Horses, RUNAH, Patricia Lalor, and SPK.

== History ==
=== Early career - Broken Toys ===
David Virgin was born in North Dublin on 14 January 1962. As a child he emigrated to Australia with his family. He grew up in Sydney and attended Christian Brothers College, Burwood. In 1978, at the age of 16, Virgin formed his first band The Broken Toys as bass player and main songwriter. He was joined by Peter Mullany (of Johnny Dole & The Scabs) on lead guitar, Andrew Campbell on rhythm guitar and vocals and Virgin's brother John on drums, who was later replaced by Paul Cosgrove. The Broken Toys played 60's pop inspired melodic punk in the style of the Buzzcocks and performed regularly at the Grand Hotel, Broadway, Sydney.

=== Early career - SPK ===
In 1979 Virgin joined Graeme Revell, Neil Hill and guitarist Dan Rumour as bassist for the industrial noise group SPK, where he co-wrote and produced the early 7" records "No More", "Kontakt", "Factory", "Germanik", "Retard", "Slogun" and "Mekano". In a 2018 interview with Pantograph Punch magazine Graeme Revell acknowledged the original SPK lineup, and their contribution "'Over all these years, I would never correct any rumour that developed. But now I know there are some people who were in the band early on that wanted a bit of credit for what they did, so I’ll give it to them.' Revell took the name Operator, and Steven Hill the name Ne/H/il. In Sydney, they met a couple of younger guys who completed the live setup (Danny Rumour and David Virgin, each who went on to be successful musicians in their own right)." In 1984 a compilation album was released called The Industrial Records Story and featured SPK (band)'s 1979 recording "Mekano" alongside Throbbing Gristle, William S. Burroughs, Cabaret Voltaire (band), Leather Nun and Elisabeth Welch. The early SPK recordings that featured Virgin were also referenced in the landmark publication RE/Search #6/7: Industrial Culture Handbook

In 2006, the SPK song Slogun was sampled in the song Hakai (Deathtroy) by Kyono, and DJ Starscream (real name Sidney George Wilson of the band Slipknot (band)). The song appeared on the official tribute album 'The Songs for Death Note the movie～the Last name Tribute～' which was released alongside the film Death Note 2: The Last Name and published by Sony Music Distribution (Japan)

=== Early career - Sekret Sekret ===
The Broken Toys disbanded in 1979 and shortly after that Virgin formed The Ugly Mirrors with Dan Rumour, Des Devlin and Peter McGregor. The Ugly Mirrors quickly became Sekret Sekret with the final line up including Colin Ellis on drums and Peter Mullany on second guitar who came over from Johnny Dole & The Scabs. Sekret Sekret performed and recorded for six years earning 5 number one singles on the Australian independent charts including the "noted underground classic New King Jack". Sekret Sekret gained national exposure performing live on the likes of Seven Network's Sounds and interviewed by host Donnie Sutherland, and were played on high rotation on Australian Broadcasting Corporation's Double J and performed a live to air concert on Triple J, some of which appears on 2008 record Sekret Sekret – Happy Town Sounds (Singles, Live & Rare). Sekret Sekret's final line up included Ken Gormley (The Cruel Sea) on bass and James Elliot (The Cruel Sea) on Drums with Des Devlin moving to share the lead guitar duties with Dan Rumour. In 1985 Sekret Sekret released their last single "Just to Love You", disbanding shortly after. Three of the members of Sekret Sekret went on to form Australian rock band The Cruel Sea with singer Tex Perkins.

=== Solo career to present ===
In 1984, Virgin recorded and released a split single with Leonard Samperi titled "Possession/Give It Up" through Waterfront Records. The single was co-produced and engineered by Clive Shakespeare of Australian pop, rock group Sherbet who also engineered a number of Sekret Sekret singles including "Girl With a White Stick/Chimes" and "Just To Love You/Waterbirds".

In 1991, Virgin reunited with SPK and Sekret Sekret band-mate Dan Rumour to record the David Virgin solo album "Landlord Green" before touring Europe in 1992. Since then Virgin has maintained a presence on the underground music scenes of Europe and Australia recording seven more solo albums; "No Fun Sessions", "Dublin 7", "Rock N Roll Meditations", "Posing As A Sodomite", "International Treasure", "Boots 'N' Tooths" and "The Beautiful Album". He also recorded a second album with Dan Rumour in 2004 titled "Virgin & Rumour". Over his live career Virgin has shared the stage with musicians and acts such as Nick Cave, John Cooper Clarke, Jonathan Richman, Mary Black, INXS, The Church, The Triffids, The Go Betweens, Cat Power, Lloyd Cole, Billy Bragg and Tim Freedman.

In 2009, Virgin was featured on the front cover of alternative LA publication Punk Globe, the issue contained an interview with Virgin conducted by Joe Dallesandro, actor, model and star of Andy Warhol films including Flesh, Trash and Heat.

In 2012, Virgin released a book titled Potato Mashi: The Underground Non-Dualist Sensation.

David Virgin now lives in Dublin, Ireland and continues to write, record and perform music solo and with his two sons Rohan Healy and Alex "Al Quiff" Healy, of The Dublin City Rounders, in the vintage, western swing and blues act David Virgin & The Stanley Knife Brothers. In November 2013, Virgin released a 23-song best-of album titled "Three Decades of David Virgin" through Beardfire Music and in January 2014 Virgin released solo album "Boots 'N' Tooths".

Virgin released an album titled The Beautiful Album in September 2017. The Beautiful Album is a selection of mainly duets by Virgin featuring Leslie Dowdall (of In Tua Nua), Leila Jane, Kate Dineen, Klara McDonnell and Elga Fox. The songs on the album were backed instrumentally by the Dublin City Rounders, Rohan Healy on guitar, Al Quiff on double bass, Adam Byrne on drums and Caoimhe O’Farrell on Irish harp. Virgin is also involved with the Dublin City Rounders as co-songwriter, producer and additional performer on their recordings.

As of 2024, Virgin continues to produce records at the Beardfire Production Studio in Dublin. Releases from the studio have included Leila Jane's 2017 EP "Decision Maker", Ailsha singles "Enemy", "Sucker", "Red Flags" and "Sleep", C.C. Cooper's single "He Wants Me Back", RUNAH's "Ghosts" EP and album "Strange", Patricia Lalor's debut single "Anymore", Martin McDonnell's single "Hold Me Tight", and All The Queen's Horses debut album The Dark Below and The Isle of Dogs, winner of the 2021 International Songwriting Competition with the song 'Jocelyn'. Virgin wrote and produced the soundtrack for Canadian/Irish documentary Portrait of the Milliner as Yer Man Himself which won Best International Short Documentary at the 17th annual Garden State Film Festival in 2019. Beardfire Studios co-produced 2024 Irish Eurosong finalist Go Tobann by Ailsha; The song came joint second in the selection process.

== Discography ==
=== Albums ===
- SPK Auto-Da-Fé (1983)
- Landlord Green (1992)
- Virgin & Rumour (2004)
- Dublin 7 (2006)
- Sekret Sekret – Happy Town Sounds (Singles, Live & Rare) (2008)
- Rock N Roll Meditations (2008)
- Posing As A Sodomite (2009)
- International Treasure (2012)
- No Fun Sessions (2013)
- Three Decades of David Virgin (2013)
- David Virgin & The Stanley Knife Brothers – Party Like It's 1899 (2014)
- Boots 'N' Tooths (2014)
- The Beautiful Album (2017)

=== Compilation albums ===
- The Industrial Records Story - Illuminated Record - 1984
- Tales From The Australian Underground Vol. 1 - Feel Presents (2003)
- Tales From The Australian Underground Vol. 2 - Feel Presents (2006)
- The Beardfire Music Cafe Mix Tape (2013)

=== Collaborations ===
- The Dublin City Rounders - On Track (2014) (writer/arranger/producer/performer)
- The Dublin City Rounders - Dis Am The Dublin City Rounders (2014) (writer/arranger/producer/performer)
- The Dublin City Rounders - Decent Folk (2014) (writer/arranger/producer/performer)
- The Dublin City Rounders - The Work of Two Men (2014) (writer/arranger/producer/performer)
- The Dublin City Rounders - It Used to Be About the Money (2016) (writer/arranger/producer)

=== Singles ===
- "Charity" (1980)
- "New King Jack" (1981)
- "Girl with a White Stick" (1984)
- "Give It Up" (1984)
- "Just To Love You" (1985)
- "Landlord Green" (1992)
- "Rock N Roll Man" (2008)
- "White Trash" (2009)
- "International Treasure" (2012)
- "At The Waning of the Moon" (2014)
- "Notre Dame" (2014)
- "The Weir" (feat. Leslie Dowdall) (2017)
- "Everything I Ever Wanted" (feat. Leila Jane) (2017)

=== Select production discography ===
- SPK - No More - 1979
- SPK - Mekano - 1979
- The Thought Criminals - "La Mer" - from the album You Only Think Twice - 1981
- Virgin & Rumour - Virgin & Rumour (album) - 2004
- The Dublin City Rounders - It Used To Be About The Money (album) - 2016
- Kate Dineen - Great Escape (ep) - 2017
- Leila Jane - Decision Maker (ep) - 2017
- Marie Conniffe - Love Madness (album) - 2018
- Aaron Nestor - Good Enough (ep) - 2018
- RUNAH - Ghosts EP - 2018
- Weekend Special - In The Heart of The Castle (album) - 2018
- Klara McDonnell - Trapped Within (ep) - 2018
- Ciaran Moran - & I Haven't Even Started Yet (ep) - 2019
- RUNAH - Strange (album) - 2019
- KTG - Searching for Magpies (mini album) - 2019
- Moylan - For the Birds (ep) - 2019
- All The Queen's Horses - The Dark Below & The Isle of Dogs (album) - 2021
