= Bernie Clifton =

British comedian and entertainer (born 1936)

- Born: Bernard M. Quinn; 22 April 1936 (age 90); St Helens, Lancashire, England
- Occupations: Entertainer; comedian; actor; singer
- Years active: 1971–present
- Spouse: Marjorie Hancock (m. 1961; died 2000)
- Children: 4

Bernard M. Quinn (born 22 April 1936), known professionally as Bernie Clifton, is a British comedian and entertainer, known for his work with his orange ostrich puppet costume Oswald the Ostrich.

== Early life ==
Clifton was born on 22 April 1936 in St Helens, Lancashire, where he also grew up. He left grammar school without any qualifications at 15 and became an apprentice plumber. Aged 21, he was called up for national service and became a radar mechanic at the Bomber Command Bombing School (BCBS) at RAF Lindholme. He has been based in South Yorkshire ever since.

== Career ==
Clifton's first performing job was as a singer with a dance band, but he was fired after a month. His first television performance was on the light-entertainment show The Good Old Days in 1971, where he was inspired by Les Dawson.

He performed in the 1979 Royal Variety Performance. He subsequently appeared on several further occasions, including the 2016 show.

He made regular appearances on Crackerjack!. During the 1980s, he appeared on The Keith Harris Show, and in 1982, Clifton ran the London Marathon with Oswald the Ostrich.

In 1993, Clifton featured very briefly in the Silence of the Lambs spoof by French & Saunders. S4 ep2. He was with his ostrich, in one of the asylum cells along with The Krankies.

In 2002, Clifton featured on the BBC Two documentary series The Entertainers, which followed 1970s and '80s entertainers who had dropped out of the limelight. In 2005, Clifton and Oswald appeared in Peter Kay's and Tony Christie's music video for the Comic Relief charity re-release of "(Is This the Way to) Amarillo".

In 2005, Clifton appeared as himself in an episode of the David Renwick sitcom Love Soup having previously been mentioned by Renwick in an early episode of his sitcom One Foot in the Grave.

Clifton made his Edinburgh Festival Fringe debut in 2006 at the Udderbelly venue. Writing in The Guardian, Brian Logan gave it 3 out of 5 stars and called it an "exercise in retro comedy", but "also unrepentantly funny".

Clifton was a contestant on Series 5 of The Voice UK, applying under his birth name. He performed "The Impossible Dream (The Quest)" from Man of La Mancha, and did not advance past the blind auditions. Following his appearance on the show he released an album of covers called The Impossible Dream, which included "The Lady in Red" and "Wind Beneath My Wings". After a death metal band's song titles were printed on his album cover by mistake, Clifton presented an award at the Kerrang! Awards in June 2016.

In 2018, he starred in ITV's Last Laugh in Vegas, a documentary following eight "showbiz legends" as they prepared a show in Las Vegas.

In January 2020, Clifton appeared as a guest on the first episode of the new series of Crackerjack! on CBBC. In February that year, he played himself in the first episode of Meet The Richardsons on Dave. Within the episode, he is a family friend of Jon Richardson and teaches him how to operate a monkey puppet similar to his ostrich.

Clifton has starred in several pantomimes, playing the father of Cinderella at the Hull New Theatre in 2018 and at Northampton's Royal & Derngate in 2019. He has also presented shows on BBC Radio Sheffield, and BBC Radio 4. In 2018, Inside No. 9 titled an episode "Bernie Clifton's Dressing Room"; while Clifton himself didn't appear in the episode, he was mentioned as part of a key plot point occurring in the titular room. On 10 March 2022, he made an unplanned telephone appearance on the Chris Moyles Show on Radio X, having been referenced by comedian, Jon Richardson, who appeared on the radio show earlier that morning. On 6 January 2026, he was the guest star in the final show of Inside Number 9: Stage/Fright at the Hammersmith Apollo.

== Personal life ==
In 1961 Clifton married Marjorie Hancock (b. 1932). They went on to have four children together. Clifton was widowed on 9 September 2000. He lives in Barlow, Derbyshire.

== Filmography ==
Year	Title	Role	Notes	Ref.
1979	Royal Variety Performance	Himself		
2002	The Entertainers	Himself		
2005	Love Soup	Himself	series 1 episode 4	
2016	The Voice UK	Himself	series 5, episode 1	
2016	Royal Variety Performance	Himself		
2018	Last Laugh in Vegas	Himself	5 episodes	
2020	Crackerjack!	Himself	1 episode	
2020	Meet The Richardsons	Himself	1 episode	
