= The Dublin City Rounders =

Irish music duo founded 2013

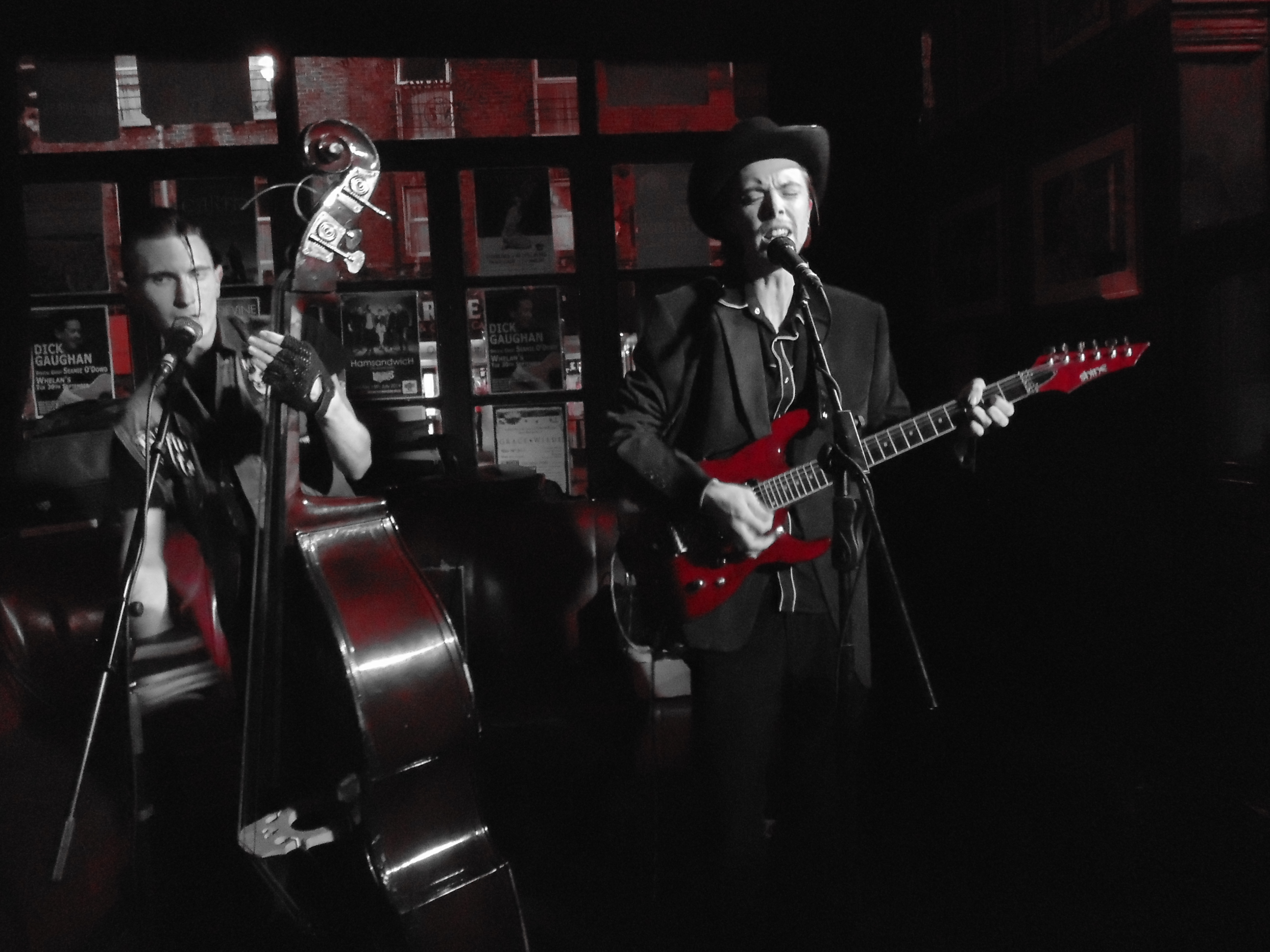
- The Dublin City Rounders playing "Folk Club" at Whelans in 2014

Background information
- Origin: Dublin, Ireland
- Genres: Western Swing, Ragtime, Bluegrass, Alt-Country, Rock N Roll
- Years active: 2013–present
- Label: Beardfire Music
- Members: Rohan Healy; Alex "Al Quiff" Healy

The Dublin City Rounders are an old timey, Americana, blues, ragtime and western swing duo from Dublin, Ireland.

== Formation ==
The act consists of brothers Rohan Healy (guitar and vocals) and Al "Quiff" Healy (upright bass, banjo and vocals), and was formed in 2013. In 2014 and 2015 the duo received national radio airplay on RTÉ Radio 1, and local radio airplay on Sunshine 106.8, Near FM and FM104 with their single "Best Boots on the Bus", a collaboration with their father David Virgin, who writes, produces and performs on a number of the band's recordings. They have shared the stage with acts including Grammy Award winning artist Jim Lauderdale, The Boxcar Preachers (Texas) and Canadian alt-country group Petunia & The Vipers. In July 2014, The Dublin City Rounders were invited to perform at Áras an Uachtaráin.

In July 2014, Kathy Sheridan stated in The Irish Times that: "The Healys’ “rootsy, country-meets-punk, antique blues, vaudevillian thing” perfectly encompasses the bewilderingly numerous threads that make up the cooler end of “country” music".

Between March and May 2015 the group took part in the televised musical talent contest Busker Abú on TG4. They won the first round and semi-final, and placed as runners-up in the final to contest winners Mahoo.

A 2015 Classic Hits 4FM radio advertising campaign by M Kelly Interiors features the song "Hey Buddy" which was written and recorded by The Dublin City Rounders. They also performed a number of shows and festivals in 2015 including four dates at the Kilkenny Roots Festival, the Creative Minds US Economic Conference and Youbloom Dublin 2015.

In January 2016, the Dublin City Rounders performed during the blind audition stage of The Voice UK with an alternative rendition of Blank Space by Taylor Swift, but did not progress to the next round.

In October 2016, the group organised an alt-country song contest in association with Irish Music Rights Organisation.

Since forming, the band have released 5 albums; "On Track" and "Dis Am The Dublin City Rounders" consisting mostly of traditionally arranged rag time and vaudeville songs, while "Decent Folk" and "The Work of Two Men" are original albums. In December 2015 they released "Best Boots Forward: The Best of The Dublin City Rounders Past, Present & Future", a compilation album. In December 2016, the group released their 5th album "It Used to be About The Money", with the single "Johnny's Last Ride" receiving national airplay on RTÉ Radio, and a "Song of The Week" listing in the Irish Times.

During 2017, members of the Dublin City Rounders performed live and on radio, including an appearance on Today with Sean O'Rourke on RTÉ Radio 1. They also performed on David Virgin's The Beautiful Album.

== Other ventures ==
In mid-2017 Rohan and Al Healy of The Dublin City Rounders began airing a weekly radio show, 'Rhythm & Roots' on Dublin City FM. In September 2018 the show was re-branded, before moving to Near FM in January 2019. The show covers genres including ragtime, country blues, western swing and music hall.

The show is filmed and recorded at Beardfire Studio, Dublin, which is owned by the group and their father David Virgin. The studio is also used for recording and production of other artists' work, and is home to the Beardfire Music record label.

== Line-up ==
The current line-up is;

- Rohan Healy – Guitar, vocals
- Alex "Al Quiff" Healy – Upright bass, banjo, percussion, vocals

== Discography ==
- On Track (2014)
- Dis Am The Dublin City Rounders (2014)
- Decent Folk (2014)
- The Work of Two Men (2014)
- Best Boots Forward (2015)
- It Used to be About The Money (2016)
