= Grand Hotel, Broadway =

Former pub in Sydney, Australia

Grand Hotel
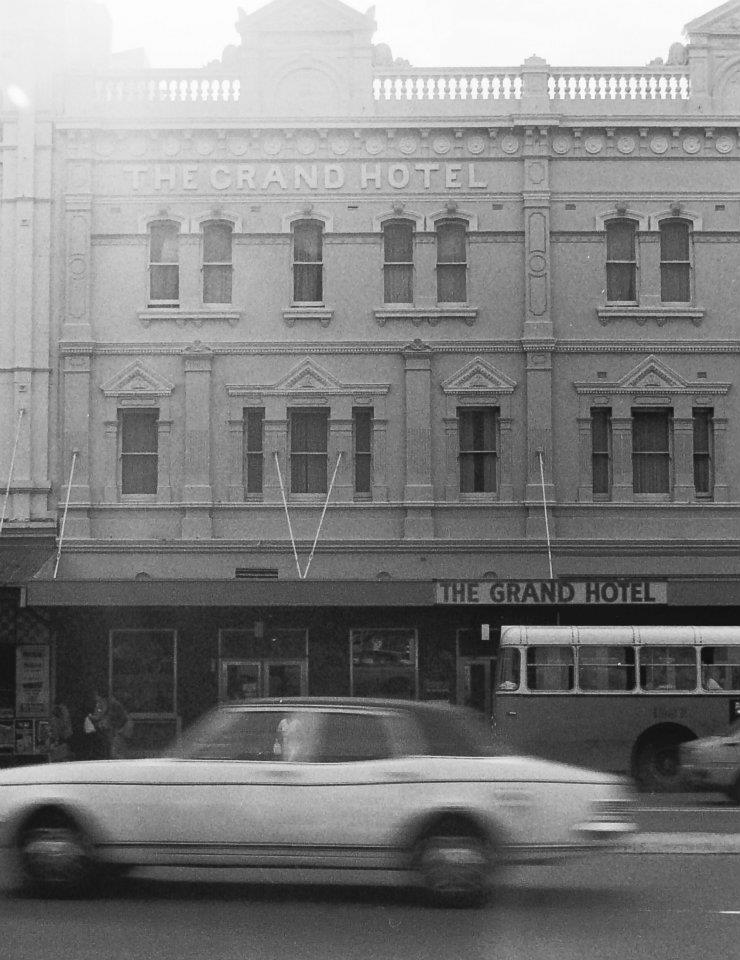
- The Grand Hotel at Broadway Sydney Photo: Joy Cornish taken 1980
- Interactive map of the Grand Hotel area

General information
- Status: Demolished
- Type: Australian pub
- Location: 815-821 George Street, Broadway, Railway Square, Haymarket, New South Wales, Australia
- Coordinates: 33°52′59″S 151°12′12″E
- Opened: 1849
- Demolished: 1983

The Grand Hotel was a pub located at Broadway, Railway Square, in the suburb of Haymarket, Sydney in the state of New South Wales, Australia.

The hotel was established in 1849 and demolished in 1983, where it was situated at 815-821 George Street, Haymarket and backed onto Bijou Lane as its rear entrance. The Grand Hotel was later replaced by a $3.6 million motel development complex which included retail shops. Some of the original structure remains at the back but from the front it is totally unrecognisable from its original look.

== History ==
Primarily its history was the same as many hotels of the time but in September 1977 its publican Dennis (last name unknown) opened its doors to the new music craze of the time, punk rock. At first the bands were booked by the manager and lead singer of Johnny Dole & The Scabs, Ray Walsh and Johnny Dole and the first bands to play there were Johnny Dole & The Scabs supported by Tommy & The Dipsticks.

Opening the Grand Hotel to punk rock coincided with the Oxford Funhouse at Taylor Square closing its doors to the bands that played there, which included punk rock bands such as Radio Birdman, Psycho Surgeons and also Johnny Dole & The Scabs. Because of this the Grand Hotel would gain the reputation of "the" place to play for a punk rock band and for starting the career of some of Australia’s most well known bands including Mental As Anything.

The Grand Hotel as a venue for punk rock was short lived and stopped the bands around 1979 but during this time most of the bands that played there have gone on to be the origins of what would soon be called new wave, which spawned many well known bands that still play into the present including Rocks, and The Thought Criminals.

== See also ==
- List of public houses in Australia
