= Powell Clayton =

American politician (1833–1914)

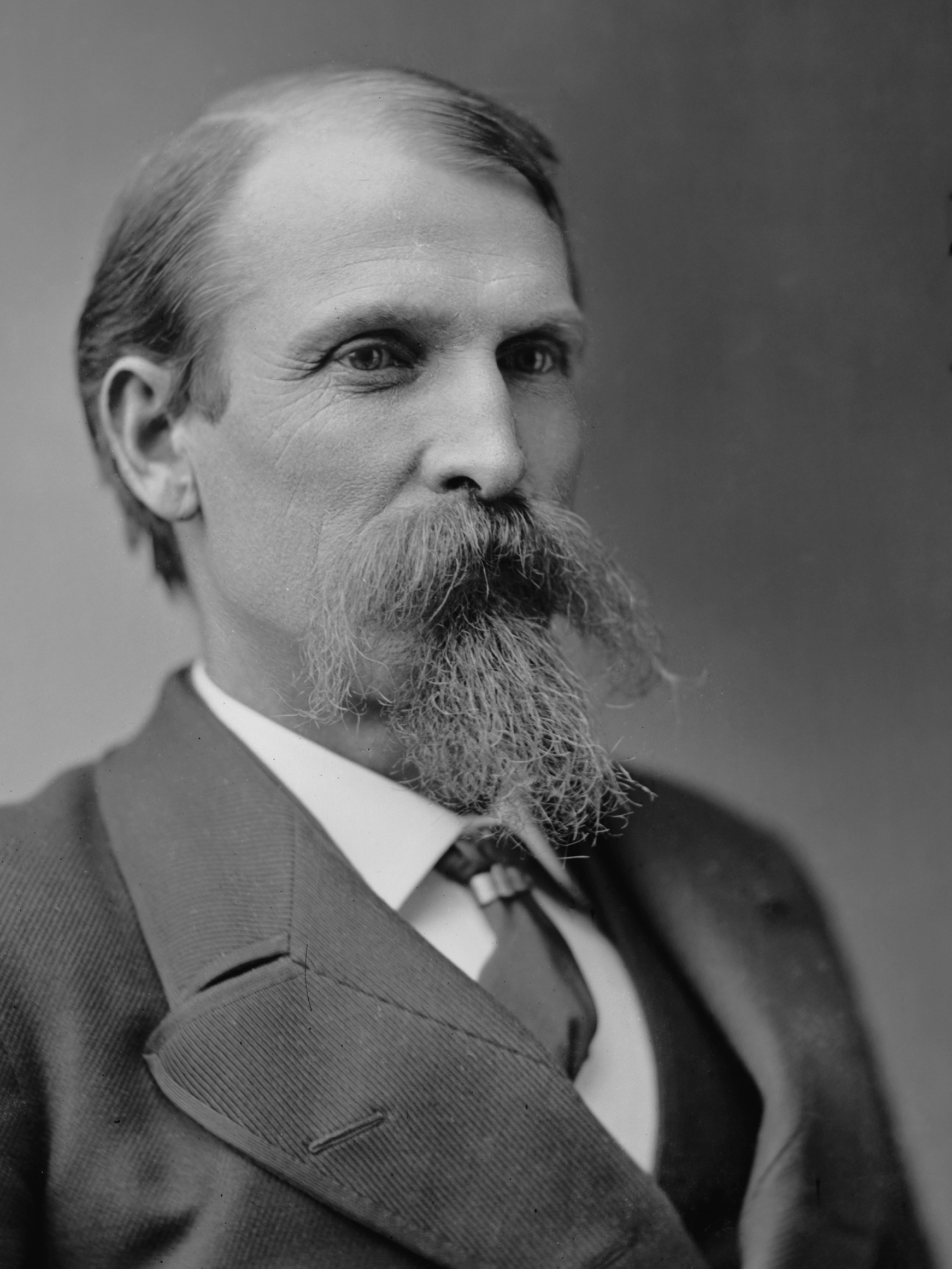
- Official portrait, c. 1871–1877

1st United States Ambassador to Mexico
- In office January 3, 1897 – May 26, 1905
- President: William McKinley; Theodore Roosevelt
- Preceded by: Position established
- Succeeded by: Edwin Conger

United States Senator from Arkansas
- In office March 4, 1871 – March 3, 1877
- Preceded by: Alexander McDonald
- Succeeded by: Augustus Garland

9th Governor of Arkansas
- In office July 2, 1868 – March 4, 1871
- Lieutenant: James M. Johnson
- Preceded by: Isaac Murphy
- Succeeded by: Ozra Hadley (acting)

Republican National Committeeman for Arkansas
- In office 1877–1898

President of the Eureka Springs Railroad
- In office 1883–1899
- Preceded by: Railroad established*
- Succeeded by: Railroad re-named*

Personal details
- Born: Powell Foulk Clayton; August 7, 1833 Bethel Township, Pennsylvania, U.S.
- Died: August 25, 1914 (aged 81) Washington, D.C., U.S.
- Resting place: Arlington National Cemetery; 38°52′45.1″N 77°04′19.8″W
- Party: Republican
- Spouse: Adaline McGraw (m. 1865)
- Children: 5
- Relatives: John M. Clayton (brother); Thomas J. Clayton (brother); W. H. H. Clayton (brother)
- Education: Forwood School, Wilmington, Delaware; Pennsylvania Literary, Scientific, and Military Academy

Military service
- Allegiance: United States
- Branch/service: United States Volunteers
- Years of service: 1861–1865
- Rank: Brigadier–General
- Commands: 5th Kansas Cavalry; Post of Pine Bluff; Cavalry Division, Seventh Army Corps
- Battles/wars: American Civil War; Battle of Wilson's Creek; Battle of Helena; Battle of Pine Bluff; Camden Expedition

Powell Foulk Clayton (August 7, 1833 – August 25, 1914) was an American politician, diplomat, and businessman who served as the 9th governor of Arkansas from 1868 to 1871, as a Republican United States Senator for Arkansas from 1871 to 1877 and as United States Ambassador to Mexico from 1897 to 1905.

During the American Civil War, he served as a senior officer of United States Volunteers and commanded cavalry in the Trans-Mississippi Theater. After the war, he married a woman from Arkansas, purchased a plantation and settled in Jefferson County. He was active in the Arkansas Republican Party and became governor after military rule was lifted and the Arkansas state constitution was ratified by Congress. He was viewed as a carpetbagger and implemented martial law in Arkansas for four months due to the rise of the Ku Klux Klan and violence against African-Americans and Republicans. The Arkansas Republican Party splintered during Clayton's governorship. Clayton and his followers were known as Minstrels and a more conservative faction led by Joseph Brooks were known as Brindletails. The power struggle between the groups resulted in the impeachment of Clayton in 1871 and the Brooks-Baxter War.

Clayton was elected to the U.S. Senate for Arkansas in March 1871. A U.S. Senate Joint Select Committee investigated him for claims made by his political rivals that he issued fraudulent election credentials during his time as governor. He was acquitted of these charges. In 1877, the legislature came under the control of Democrats after Reconstruction, who voted to replace Clayton. He returned to Arkansas from Washington, D.C., where he remained active in the Republican National Committee. He helped William McKinley receive the Republican nomination for president in 1896. After McKinley's victory, Clayton was rewarded for his support with an appointment as Ambassador to Mexico.

In 1882, Clayton established a home in the developing resort town of Eureka Springs, Arkansas. He was president of the Eureka Springs Improvement Company and worked to develop commercial and residential properties. In 1883, he became president of the Eureka Springs Railroad, which provided rail service to the developing community. He died in Washington, D.C., in 1914 and was interred at Arlington National Cemetery.

== Early life and career ==
Powell Foulk Clayton was born in Bethel Township, Pennsylvania, to John and Ann (Clarke) Clayton. The Clayton family was descended from early Quaker settlers of Pennsylvania. Clayton's ancestor William Clayton emigrated from Chichester, England, was a personal friend and associate of William Penn, and was appointed as one of nine justices who sat at the Upland Court in 1681.

Clayton attended the Forwood School in Wilmington, Delaware and the Pennsylvania Literary, Scientific, and Military Academy in Bristol, Pennsylvania. He later studied civil engineering in Wilmington.

In 1855, he moved to Kansas to work as a surveyor. He speculated in land in Kansas. He entered politics when he successfully ran for the office of city engineer in Leavenworth, Kansas, in either 1859 or 1860.

== American Civil War ==
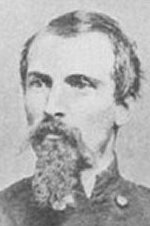
Clayton in uniform

In May 1861 Clayton was formally mustered into the U.S. Volunteers as a captain of Company E in the 1st Kansas Infantry. During the war he served primarily in Arkansas and Missouri and fought in several battles in those states. In August 1861, Clayton received a commendation for his leadership when his unit saw action in the Battle of Wilson's Creek in Missouri. He was promoted to lieutenant colonel of the 5th Kansas Cavalry in December 1861 and to colonel in March 1862.

At the Battle of Helena in Arkansas on July 4, 1863, Clayton was in charge of the cavalry brigade on the right flank of the Union forces. He received commendations for his actions during the battle. In August and September 1863, Clayton's regiment accompanied Major General Frederick Steele's troops in the campaign against Little Rock.

In October 1863, Clayton commanded federal troops occupying Pine Bluff, Arkansas, using the Boone-Murphy House as his headquarters. During the Battle of Pine Bluff, he successfully repulsed a three-pronged Confederate attack of the forces of Brigadier General John S. Marmaduke. During the battle, his troops piled cotton bales around the Jefferson County Courthouse and surrounding streets to make a barricade for the Union defenders. He also made several forays around Little Rock, including to support Steele during the Camden Expedition in the spring of 1864.

Clayton was idolized by his men and respected by his enemies. John Edwards, a Confederate officer in Joseph O. Shelby's command wrote: "Colonel Clayton was an officer of activity and enterprise, clear-headed, quick to conceive, and bold and rapid to execute. His success in the field has caused him...to be considered the ablest Federal commander of Cavalry west of the Mississippi."

Clayton was appointed a brigadier general of volunteers on August 1, 1864. When he was mustered out of the service in August 1865, he commanded the cavalry division of the Seventh Army Corps. While still in command at Pine Bluff, Clayton invested in cotton. He acquired enough funds to purchase a plantation in Jefferson County, Arkansas, where he resided after the war.

After the war, Clayton became a Companion of the First Class of the Missouri Commandery of the Military Order of the Loyal Legion of the United States.

== Political career ==
=== Governor of Arkansas: 1868–1871 ===
In 1867, Clayton participated in the formation of the Arkansas Republican party. He entered Arkansas politics due his belief that Unionists needed additional protection after several confrontations with ex-Rebels on his plantation.

In 1866, Democrats took control of the state legislature and nominated two U.S. Senators. However, the Republican-controlled Congress refused to seat them. In March 1867, Congress passed the Reconstruction Acts of 1867 declaring the governments of Arkansas and nine other former Confederate states illegal and requiring those states to adopt new constitutions providing civil rights to freedmen. Military rule was established across the South during Congressional Reconstruction. General Edward Ord was appointed military governor of the Fourth Military District which included Arkansas. The Arkansas legislature was disbanded and Ord called for a constitutional convention.

Most of the delegates to the 1868 constitutional convention were Republican since few Democrats could take the "ironclad oath" that they had not served in the Confederacy, or provided aid or comfort to the enemy. Although Clayton was not a delegate to the constitutional convention, he did participate in the Republican state nominating convention which was meeting at the same time.

Clayton was selected as the Republican gubernatorial nominee and James M. Johnson as the candidate for lieutenant governor.

The ratification of the 1868 constitution, providing civil rights and the vote to freedmen, produced a furor among Democrats, who adhered to white supremacist beliefs. That Spring the Ku Klux Klan arose in Arkansas, and was responsible for more than 200 murders leading up to the 1868 election.

On April 1, 1868, the state board of election commissioners announced ratification of the constitution and Clayton's election as Governor of Arkansas. Congress accepted the Arkansas constitution of 1868 as legal. Democratic President Andrew Johnson (who had succeeded to office following Lincoln's assassination) vetoed it, but the Republican-dominated Congress overrode his veto. The state was readmitted to representation in Congress when Clayton was inaugurated as Governor on July 2, 1868. The new legislature unanimously accepted the Fourteenth Amendment, and Congress declared Arkansas reconstructed.

As governor, Clayton faced fierce opposition from the state's conservative political leaders and violence against blacks and members of the Republican party led by the Ku Klux Klan. During this time Arkansas Republican Congressman James Hinds was attacked and killed while on his way to a political event, and Clayton survived an attempt on his life. An agent of Clayton was killed by a group of men led by Dandridge McRae and Jacob Frolich, the leaders of the White County, Arkansas chapter of the Ku Klux Klan. Clayton responded aggressively to the emergence of the Klan in Arkansas by declaring martial law in fourteen counties for four months in late 1868 and early 1869. Clayton organized the state militia and placed General Daniel Phillips Upham in charge to help suppress violence throughout the state.

During his three-year term as governor, Clayton and the Republicans in the legislature passed many laws. Money was borrowed to fund the construction of several railroads throughout the state. The first ever free public school system in Arkansas was initiated during Clayton's governorship. The Clayton administration also established Arkansas Industrial University, the Arkansas School for the Deaf, and relocated the Arkansas School for the Blind.

=== Brooks-Baxter War ===
During Clayton's Reconstruction governorship, the Arkansas Republican party splintered in the face of serious opposition from conservatives. Clayton and his supporters were known locally as "Minstrels", they dominated the Republican party and were able to secure recognition from the National Republican organization and control the federal patronage in the state. This position garnered Clayton few friends at the state Republican party level and he faced repeated challenges to his leadership. The affair has become known as the Brooks-Baxter War.

In 1868, Joseph Brooks who had been a partner with Clayton in the formation of the Arkansas Republican party, broke with Clayton and formed a faction known as the "Brindletails". Brooks' opposition to Clayton developed partly due to Clayton's increasingly moderate stance toward ex-Confederates but also due to Clayton's displacement of Brooks as leader of the Arkansas Republican party.

In 1869, Lieutenant Governor James M. Johnson charged Clayton with corruption in the issuance of railroad bonds and misuse of power in his program to suppress violence. The supporters of Johnson, mostly white Republicans from Northwest Arkansas called themselves Liberal Republicans. The Brindletails impeached Clayton in 1871; however, the legislature never heard the case against him and he withstood the challenge.

=== U.S. Senator: 1871–1877 ===
In January 1871, the Arkansas legislature elected Clayton to the United States Senate which initiated another controversy of Clayton's administration. Clayton did not want to accept the Senate seat and have his political opponent and lieutenant governor James M. Johnson succeed him as governor. Instead, Clayton refused the Senate position and negotiated Johnson's appointment as Secretary of State of Arkansas and replaced Johnson with Ozra Hadley. In March 1871, the legislature again elected Clayton to the U.S. Senate which he accepted this time.

He served as chairman on the Committee on Enrolled Bills and on the Committee on Civil Service Retrenchment.

In January 1872, the U.S. Senate Joint Select Committee to Inquire into the Condition of the Late Insurrectionary States heard testimony raising questions about Clayton's behavior and integrity as governor. A United States district attorney testified that in April 1871, after Clayton became U.S. Senator, a grand jury had indicted him on charges that as governor Clayton issued fraudulent election credentials for the U.S. House of Representatives election to John Edwards.

In response to these allegations, Clayton contended that in eight precincts, there had been two separate sets of polls. One set was overseen by authorized judges and the other under the unauthorized control of opposing political factions. The Arkansas Supreme Court ruled that the legal election had been held at the authorized polling places and that returns from the others were fraudulent. As governor, Clayton discarded the returns from the fraudulent polling places and certified the candidate who won from the genuine votes. The opposing candidate, Thomas Boles, contested the election and replaced John Edwards in the U.S. House of Representatives in February 1872.

The committee judged the issue to be beyond its jurisdiction and turned the matter over to the Senate. At Clayton's request, the Senate appointed a special three-member committee to investigate the charges. In June 1872, after interviewing thirty-eight witnesses and generating five thousand pages of transcript, the committee issued a partial report indicating that the testimony appeared to not sustain the charges against Clayton. The committee noted that the charges came from Clayton's bitter political rivals and that the indictment against Clayton had been dropped due to lack of evidence. However, the committee members stated that they required additional time and would issue a final report in the next session of the Senate.

In February 1873, the committee issued its final report declaring that the testimony failed to sustain the charges against Clayton and that there was no evidence that he had any fraudulent intent in certifying the election of Edwards as directed by the state supreme court. The Senate voted 33 to 6 to accept the committee's findings. Nine senators, mostly Democrats, abstained from voting on the grounds that they were not given enough time to sufficiently review all of the testimony.

While in the Senate, Clayton appealed to his brother, W. H. H. Clayton, the US Attorney in Arkansas, and President Ulysses S. Grant to have Judge Isaac C. Parker reassigned from Utah to Fort Smith, Arkansas, a frontier area with a high rate of violence and crime. Parker, the legendary "Hanging Judge," along with U.S. Attorney Clayton, are credited with bringing law and order to the region.

In 1877, Clayton lost his Senate seat since the legislature, now dominated by Democrats elected one of their own to the Senate. Clayton moved back to Little Rock, Arkansas where he resumed his law practice and supported economic development.

== Later life and death ==
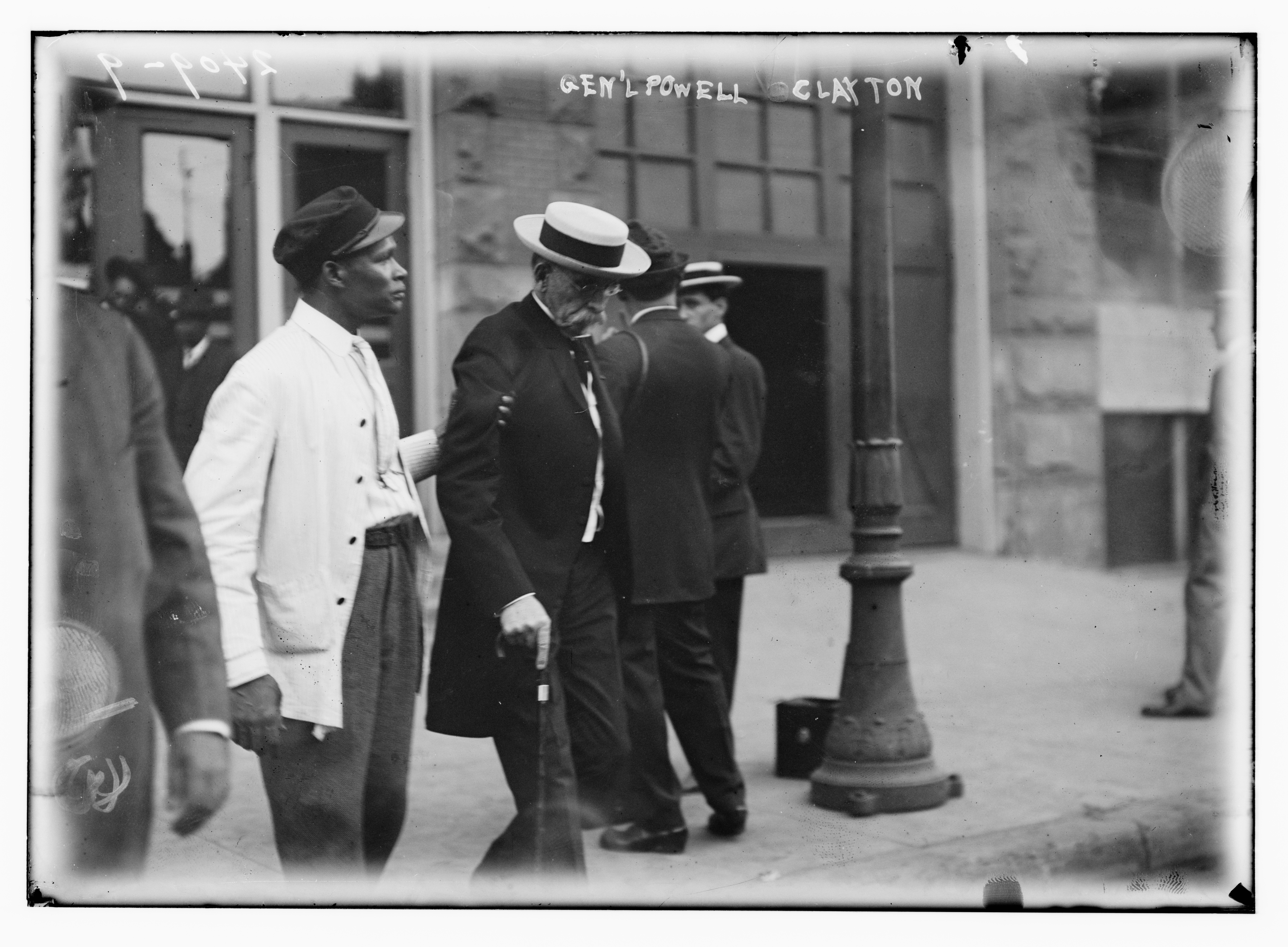
Clayton at the 1912 Republican National Convention held at the Chicago Coliseum, Chicago, Illinois

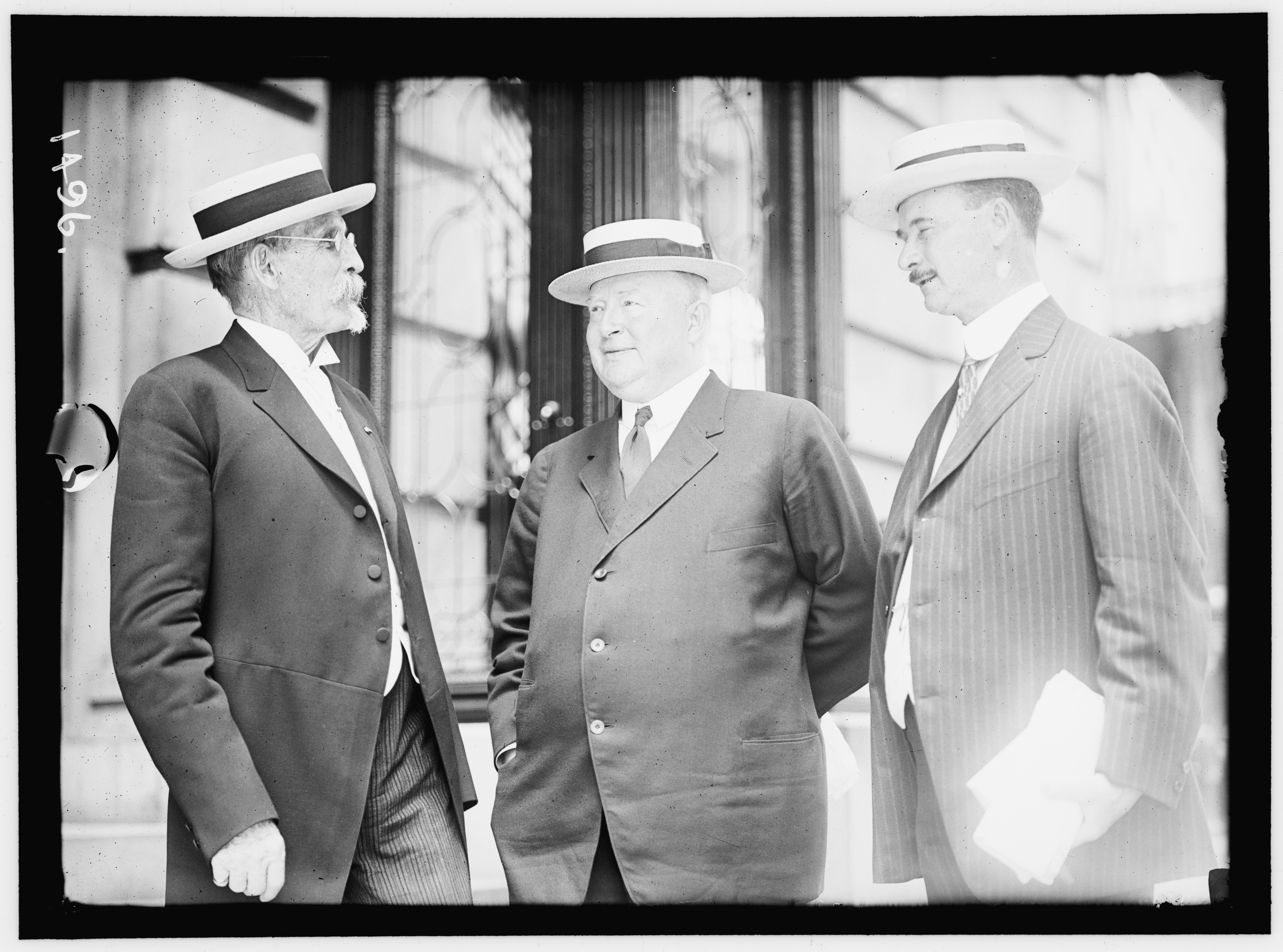
Members of the Republican National Committee: Clayton, T. K. Niedrughaus of Missouri and Alvah H. Martin of Virginia

In 1882, Clayton established a home at the developing resort town of Eureka Springs in Carroll County in northwestern Arkansas. He and his wife lived in what is now the Crescent Cottage Inn. As president of the Eureka Springs Improvement Company (ESIC), Clayton worked to develop commercial and residential structures, many which still exist. ESIC sponsored the development of the Eureka Springs Railroad which was key to making the resort accessible to tourists. The ESIC also built the Crescent Hotel, now one of Eureka Springs' most notable landmarks. A poem on the fireplace in the lobby of the Crescent Hotel is attributed to Clayton. In 1883, Clayton became the president of the Eureka Springs Railway, which provided service to the resort community until 1889, when it was merged into what became the Missouri and North Arkansas Railroad. The now-defunct railroad line provided passenger and freight service from Joplin, Missouri, to Helena in Phillips County in eastern Arkansas.

Clayton remained active in the Republican Party. He became a member of the Republican National Committee in 1872 and was still consulted to fill federal patronage positions through 1912. In 1896 and 1897, as a member of the Republican National Committee, he was instrumental in delivering votes from the entire Arkansas delegation for William McKinley's Republican nomination as president. Clayton also led the Republican speakers' bureau for the East Coast. He was appointed as the first ambassador to Mexico by President McKinley when that post was elevated to an embassy post and served until 1905. After resigning as Ambassador of Mexico, he lived in Washington, D.C. but was still able to manage multiple businesses and enterprises in Arkansas. He continued to do this, as well as preserving his status in the Republican party. He died in Washington, D.C., on August 25, 1914, and was interred at Arlington National Cemetery in Arlington, Virginia.

== Personal life ==
On December 14, 1865, Clayton married Adaline McGraw of Helena, Arkansas. Together they had three daughters and two sons although one son died in early infancy. Their son, Powell Clayton Jr., became a major in the 16th United States Cavalry and is also buried in Arlington National Cemetery. Two of Clayton's daughters married diplomats from Belgium and England. On September 9, 1868, Clayton lost his left hand while hunting outside Little Rock when his rifle discharged.

Clayton had two twin brothers, W. H. H. Clayton and John M. Clayton. These three men made their careers in Arkansas. William was appointed as the U.S. Attorney for the Western District of Arkansas and served as the chief prosecutor in the court of "hanging judge" Isaac C. Parker for 14 years. John was elected as an Arkansas Congressman, Arkansas State Senator and U.S. Congressman-elect. John was assassinated in 1889 in Plumerville, Arkansas. He had disputed the election results of a Congressional race with Democrat Clifton R. Breckinridge and was shot through the window of the boarding-house where he was staying. Clayton's brother Thomas J. Clayton, became a prominent Philadelphia lawyer and a Judge of the Court of Common Pleas of Pennsylvania for Delaware County, serving for 25 years.

== Bibliography ==
- The Aftermath of the Civil War, in Arkansas (1915)

== See also ==
- Brooks-Baxter War
- Clayton family
- List of American Civil War generals (Union)
- List of governors of Arkansas

== Sources ==
- Christ, Mark K. (2012). Civil War Arkansas, 1863: The Battle for a State. The University of Oklahoma Press. ISBN 978-0-8061-4087-2.
- Donovan, Timothy B. (1981). The Governors of Arkansas. The University of Arkansas Press. ISBN 0-938626-00-0.

Political offices
Preceded by Isaac Murphy	Governor of Arkansas; 1868–1871	Succeeded by Ozra Hadley; Acting
U.S. Senate
Preceded by Alexander McDonald	U.S. senator (Class 2) from Arkansas; 1871–1877; Served alongside: Benjamin Rice, Stephen Dorsey	Succeeded by Augustus Garland
Diplomatic posts
Preceded by Position established	United States Ambassador to Mexico; 1899–1905	Succeeded by Edwin Conger
