= John M. Clayton (Arkansas politician) =

American politician (1840–1889)

John Clayton
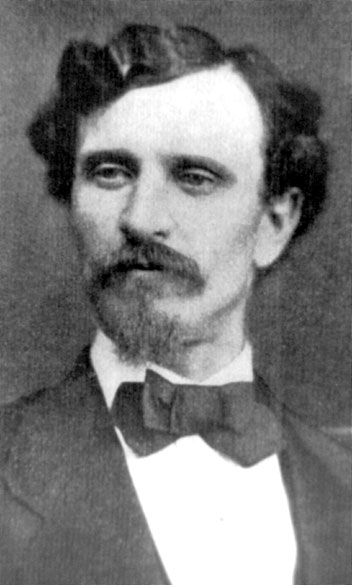

Member-elect of the U.S. House of Representatives from Arkansas's 2nd district
- Died before taking office
- Preceded by: Clifton R. Breckinridge
- Succeeded by: Clifton R. Breckinridge

Personal details
- Born: John Middleton Clayton; October 13, 1840 Bethel Township, Pennsylvania, U.S.
- Died: January 29, 1889 (aged 48) Conway County, Arkansas, U.S.
- Party: Republican
- Spouse: Sarah Ann
- Children: 6
- Relatives: Powell Clayton (brother); Thomas J. Clayton (brother); W. H. H. Clayton (twin)

John Middleton Clayton (October 13, 1840 – January 29, 1889) was an American politician who served as a Republican member of the Arkansas House of Representatives for Jefferson County from 1871 to 1873 and the Arkansas State Senate for Jefferson County. In 1888, he ran for a seat in the United States House of Representatives but lost to Clifton R. Breckinridge. Clayton challenged the results and was assassinated in 1889 during the challenge to the election. He was declared the winner of the election posthumously. The identity of his assassin remains unknown.

He was the brother of Arkansas Governor and U.S. Senator Powell Clayton, President Judge of the Thirty-Second Judicial District of Pennsylvania Thomas J. Clayton and twin-brother to U.S. Attorney W.H.H. Clayton.

== Early life ==
Clayton was born on a farm in Bethel Township, Pennsylvania, to John and Ann Glover Clayton. The Clayton family was descended from early Quaker settlers of Pennsylvania. Clayton's ancestor William Clayton emigrated from Chichester, England, was a personal friend of William Penn, one of nine justices who sat at the Upland Court in 1681, and a member of Penn's Council.

At birth, Clayton was named John Tyler Clayton by his father, who was a strong Whig party supporter. However, after the death of President William Henry Harrison and what he described as "John Tyler's treacherous abandonment of the party", Clayton's father renamed him John Middleton Clayton.

During the Civil War, he served as a Colonel in the Army of the Potomac where he engaged in several campaigns in the east. In 1867, he and his family moved to Arkansas, where he managed a plantation owned by his older brother, Powell Clayton, who would become the governor of Arkansas the next year.

== Career ==
In 1871, Clayton was elected to the Arkansas House of Representatives representing Jefferson County. In 1873, he served in the Arkansas Senate representing Jefferson, Bradley, Grant and Lincoln Counties, also serving as Speaker of the Senate pro tempore for part of his term. He served on the first board of trustees of Arkansas Industrial University, today the University of Arkansas, when it was chartered in 1871. Two years later, Clayton helped Pine Bluff, Arkansas, secure the Branch Normal College, today the University of Arkansas at Pine Bluff.

Clayton became involved in the Brooks-Baxter War of 1874, which was fought over the disputed election for the governor's office between Joseph Brooks and Elisha Baxter. Clayton, a supporter of Brooks's, raised troops in Jefferson County and marched them to Little Rock, Arkansas, where they fought Baxter supporters. He remained loyal to Brooks to the end of the conflict when President Ulysses S. Grant declared Baxter the rightful governor.

Clayton remained involved in Arkansas politics in the years after Reconstruction. With the support of black Republican voters, he became sheriff of Jefferson County in 1876, being reelected to five successive, two-year terms.

== Federal election and death ==
In 1888, he ran to represent Arkansas's 2nd congressional district in the United States House of Representatives, going up against incumbent Democrat Clifton R. Breckinridge. The election became one of the most fraudulent in Arkansas's history. Clayton lost the election by a narrow margin of 846 out of over 34,000 votes cast. However, in one case in Conway County, four masked and armed white men stormed into a predominantly black voting precinct and, at gunpoint, stole the ballot box that contained a large majority of votes for Clayton. Losing under such circumstances, Clayton decided to contest the election and went to Plumerville, Arkansas to start an investigation into the matter. On the evening of January 29, 1889, an unknown assailant shot through the window of the room he was staying in at a local boardinghouse and killed him instantly. He was later declared the winner of the election, Breckinridge was unseated, and the seat was declared vacant. His assassin was never found.

== Personal life ==
Clayton married Sarah Ann, and together they had six children. Clayton is interred in Bellwood Cemetery in Pine Bluff, Arkansas.

== See also ==
- List of assassinated American politicians
- Clayton family
- List of unsolved murders
- List of United States representatives-elect who never took their seats

U.S. House of Representatives
| Preceded by Clifton R. Breckinridge | Member-elect of the U.S. House of Representatives from Arkansas's 2nd congressional district 1888–1889 | Succeeded by Clifton R. Breckinridge |
