= Thomas J. Clayton =

American lawyer and judge (1826–1900)

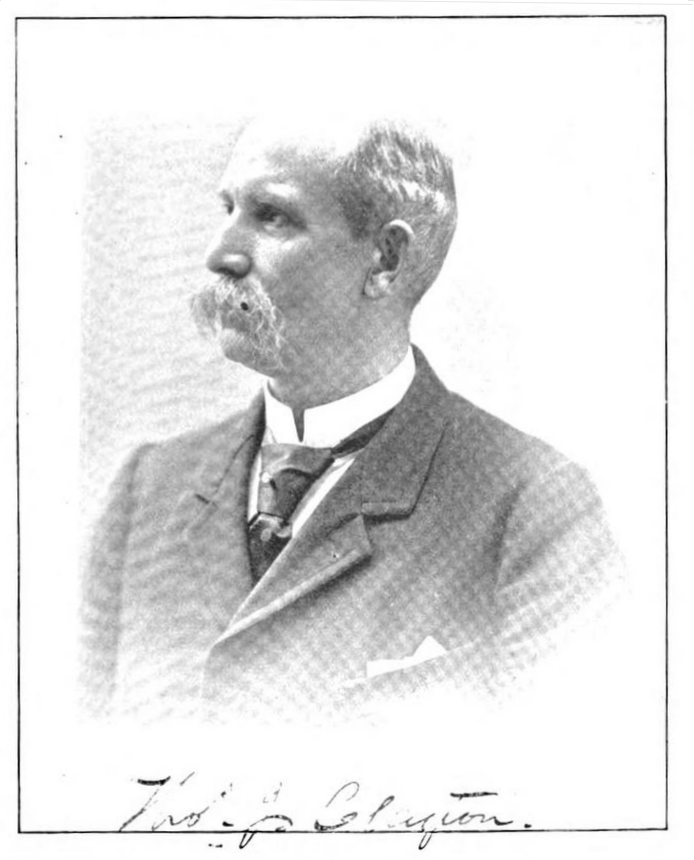

President Judge of the Thirty-Second Judicial District of Pennsylvania
- In office November 3, 1874 – January 30, 1900
- Preceded by: John Martin Broomall
- Succeeded by: Isaac Johnson

Personal details
- Born: July 20, 1826 Bethel Township, Pennsylvania
- Died: January 30, 1900 (aged 73)
- Resting place: Chester-Bethel Church Cemetery, Wilmington, Delaware
- Party: Republican
- Relatives: John M. Clayton (brother); Powell Clayton (brother); W. H. H. Clayton (brother)

Thomas Jefferson Clayton (July 20, 1826 – January 30, 1900) was an American lawyer from Pennsylvania who served as the first elected President Judge of the Thirty-Second Judicial District of Pennsylvania from 1874 to 1900. Clayton was an author of several letters to the Delaware County Republican newspaper based on his travels throughout Europe, Asia and Africa which were turned into a book.

He was the brother of Arkansas Governor and U.S. Senator Powell Clayton, U.S. Attorney W.H.H. Clayton and U.S. Congressman elect John Middleton Clayton.

== Early life and education ==
Clayton was born in Bethel Township, Pennsylvania, to John and Ann Glover Clayton. The Clayton family was descended from early Quaker settlers of Pennsylvania. Clayton's ancestor William Clayton emigrated from Chichester, England, was a personal friend of William Penn, one of nine justices who sat at the Upland Court in 1681, and a member of Penn's Council.

Clayton studied law under Daniel M. Bates, the Chancellor of the Delaware Court of Chancery and under Edward Darlington who became a U.S. Congressman for Pennsylvania's 4th Congressional district. He was admitted to the Delaware County bar in 1851 and to the Philadelphia bar in 1852.

== Career ==
Clayton practiced law mainly in Philadelphia but lived in Delaware County in Thurlow which is now a part of the city of Chester. He was a skilled politician who never held office until being elected judge and built up a strong political machine in Delaware County.

In 1856, Clayton was appointed by Pennsylvania Governor James Pollock as a member of his personal staff with the rank of Colonel.

In 1868, he traveled to Europe and contributed a series of letter to the Delaware County Republican newspaper which were subsequently published in a book titled "Rambles and Reflections".

Pennsylvania amended the state constitution in 1852 changing the position of President Judge from an appointed one to an elected position. In 1874, Governor John F. Hartranft appointed Judge John Martin Broomall to the interim position of President Judge for the newly created Thirty-Second Judicial District. However, Clayton defeated Broomall in the election for President Judge of the Thirty-Second Judicial District on an independent ticket which had support from the Democratic Party against Broomall who was the nominee of the Republican Party. He was re-elected on the Republican Party ticket after his first ten year term was completed in 1884 and again in 1894. He served until his death in 1900.

During his career, Clayton faced accusations of fraudulent election practices and the use of liquor licenses for political leverage.

== Bibliography ==
- Clayton, Thomas Jefferson, Rambles and Reflections, Press of the Delaware County Republican, Chester, Pennsylvania, 1892.

== Personal life ==
In 1854, Clayton married Sarah J. McCay and together they had four children. Clayton is interred at the Chester-Bethel Church cemetery in Wilmington, Delaware.

== Legacy ==
The Clayton School on 7th and Harwick Street in Chester, Pennsylvania was named in honor of Clayton.

In 1920, the Reverend Augustine L. Ganster purchased Clayton's mansion at Ninth and Wilson streets in Chester, Pennsylvania for the purpose of converting it into a hospital. The property eventually became Community Hospital, part of the Crozer Keystone Health System.

== See also ==
- Clayton family
