= W. H. H. Clayton =

American judge (1840–1920)

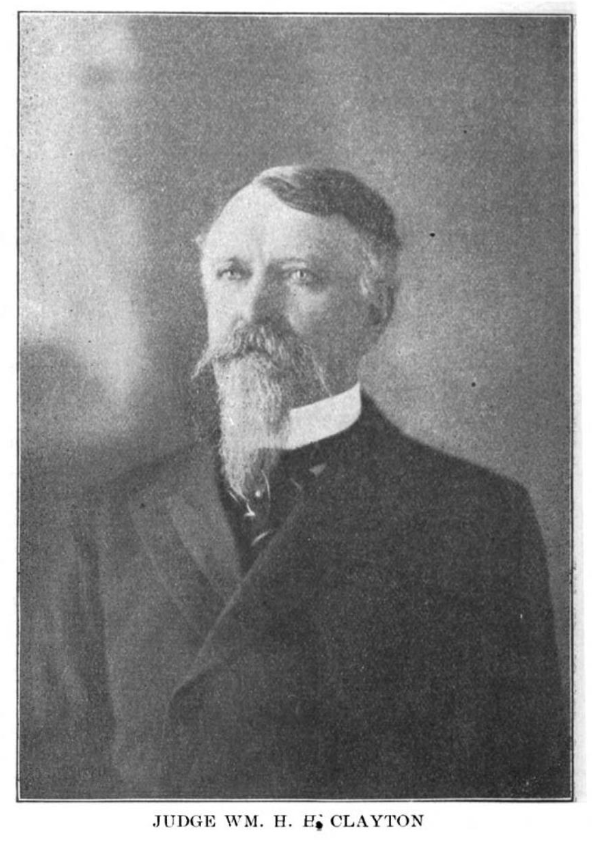
- Clayton in 1898

Judge for Central District of the United States Court for the Indian Territory
- In office 1897 – November 16, 1907
- Appointed by: William McKinley
- Preceded by: William Yancey Lewis
- Succeeded by: Position disestablished

Personal details
- Born: William Henry Harrison Clayton; October 13, 1840 Bethel Township, Delaware County, Pennsylvania, U.S.
- Died: December 14, 1920 (age 80) McAlester, Oklahoma, U.S.
- Resting place: Fort Smith National Cemetery, Fort Smith, Arkansas, U.S.
- Relatives: John M. Clayton (twin); Powell Clayton (brother); Thomas J. Clayton (brother)
- Occupation: Soldier, attorney, judge,
- Known for: U.S. Attorney for the United States District Court for the Western District of Arkansas (1874–1893); United States Federal Judge in the Central District of the Indian Territory (1896–1907)

William Henry Harrison Clayton (October 13, 1840 – December 14, 1920) was an American lawyer and judge in post-Civil War Arkansas and Indian Territory, Oklahoma. He served as the United States Attorney for the United States District Court for the Western District of Arkansas, as chief prosecutor in the court of "hanging judge" Isaac C. Parker for 14 years and as a federal judge in the Central District of the Indian Territory that became the state of Oklahoma.

He served as a lieutenant in the Union Army during the U.S. Civil War and fought in some of the key battles of the war.

He was the brother of Arkansas Governor Powell Clayton, President Judge of the Thirty-Second Judicial District of Pennsylvania Thomas J. Clayton and twin-brother of U.S. Congressman-elect John Middleton Clayton.

== Early life and education ==
Clayton was born in Bethel Township, Pennsylvania, to John and Ann Glover Clayton. The Clayton family was descended from early Quaker settlers of Pennsylvania. Clayton's ancestor William Clayton emigrated from Chichester, England, was a personal friend of William Penn, one of nine justices who sat at the Upland Court in 1681, and a member of Penn's Council.

Clayton was raised on his father's farm and received his early education at the Village Green Seminary.

== Civil War ==
In 1862, pursuant to proclamations from President Abraham Lincoln and Governor Andrew Gregg Curtin, he raised a company in Delaware County—this company became Company H of the 124th Regiment, Pennsylvania Volunteers. The 124th Regiment served a nine-month enlistment, commencing in August 1862, and ending in May 1863, during a critical period in the American Civil War. Clayton served as a lieutenant in Company H, while his twin brother John M. Clayton served as the first sergeant in the same Company. The 124th Regiment was under the command of Colonel Joseph W. Hawley.

The 124th Regiment was in reserve during the Battle of Second Bull Run and, on September 9, 1862, became part of the Twelfth Corps of the Army of the Potomac under the command of General Joseph K. Mansfield. In that capacity, the 124th maneuvered on the field but did not participate in the Battle of South Mountain, as General Robert E. Lee began his advance into Maryland. The Twelfth Corps marched further into Maryland and, on September 17, 1862—less than six weeks after being commissioned—Clayton and the 124th Regiment were involved in the most violent one day conflict in American history—the Battle of Antietam.

During Antietam, the 124th Regiment engaged in the furious fighting in Miller's cornfield. Early in this combat, Colonel Hawley was shot in the neck, while General Mansfield was shot off his horse and mortally wounded as he led other Regiments of the Twelfth Corps into battle (his successor, General Samuel W. Crawford was also carried from the field). The 124th Regiment suffered 64 casualties during the battle. The next day, Clayton and his colleagues in the 124th Regiment had burial duty and had to clean up the carnage and slaughter of America's bloodiest day.

The 124th Regiment was involved in the Fredericksburg campaign of General Ambrose Burnside but was not part of the disastrous Battle of Fredericksburg. After the battle, the 124th, along with the rest of the Army of the Potomac, meandered through Virginia as part of Burnside's miserable "Mud March." While in camp, on April 10, 1863, President Lincoln reviewed the Twelfth Corps. The 124th was then involved in the spring campaign of the newest leader of the Union Army—General Joseph Hooker—and saw combat again in the Battle of Chancellorsville. The 124th returned to its old camps after Chancellorsville.–They had completed their enlistment and were discharged and mustered out of service on May 17, 1863.

Just over one month after the discharge of the 124th, General Lee again attempted to invade the Union States, this time making it to Pennsylvania. Governor Curtin declared another state of emergency, and Clayton and most of the members of the 124th were hastily assembled into the newly formed 29th Emergency Regiment, Pennsylvania Volunteer Militia. The new 29th remained in Chester and Delaware counties during the Battle of Gettysburg, but, after the battle, Colonel Hawley led a brigade consisting of the 29th and two New York regiments in pursuit of the defeated Confederate troops. This ended Clayton's active involvement in the Civil War. After his service, he took a position as a teacher of military tactics and other subjects at the Village Green Seminary in Delaware County, Pennsylvania.

== Career in Arkansas ==
When the Civil War ended, Clayton followed his brother Powell to Pine Bluff, Arkansas, and with John M. Clayton, the three brothers purchased 2,000 acres (8 km^{2}) of land on the Arkansas River. Like his brother Powell, W. H. H. Clayton married a southern woman, Florence Barnes. In 1868, Powell Clayton was elected Governor of Arkansas, and W. H. H. Clayton, while studying law, was appointed circuit superintendent of public instruction for the Seventh Judicial Circuit of Arkansas and helped organize an education system for the newly freed slaves.

In 1871, he was admitted to the bar and was appointed prosecuting attorney for the First Judicial Circuit of Arkansas. In 1873, Governor Elisha Baxter appointed him a judge of the same Circuit Court, but in July 1874 he resigned this position to accept an appointment, offered by President Ulysses Grant as United States Attorney for the Western District of Arkansas.

The United States District Court for the Western District of Arkansas had recently moved to Fort Smith, Arkansas, and W. H. H. Clayton moved to Fort Smith when he took the U.S. Attorney position. In 1882, Clayton purchased an old house in the downtown area of Fort Smith, which he enlarged and renovated. Clayton and his family lived in this house until he left Fort Smith for McAlester, Oklahoma in 1897 and owned it until 1912. The "Clayton House" has been restored by the Fort Smith Heritage Foundation and is a historical home that is open to the public.

Clayton's twin brother John Middleton Clayton enjoyed a political career of distinction after moving to Arkansas. John M. Clayton served in both houses of the Arkansas General Assembly and also served three terms as sheriff of Jefferson County, Arkansas. In 1888, John M. Clayton ran for U.S. Representative as the Republican candidate against Democratic Party candidate Clifton R. Breckinridge. The election was hotly contested and replete with charges of serious voter fraud and illegality. John M. Clayton was assassinated on January 29, 1889, before a winner of the election could be declared. Despite an investigation by Pinkerton detectives that had been financed by Powell and W. H. H. Clayton, the assassin was never found.

== Service in Judge Parker's court ==
In 1875, the United States District Court for the Western District of Arkansas had jurisdiction over one-third of the state of Arkansas and all of the Indian Territory to the west that eventually became the state of Oklahoma. This area comprised over 74,000 square miles (190,000 km^{2}) of some of the most wild and violent lands in the postbellum United States. At the request of Powell Clayton and other prominent Arkansas Republicans, President Grant appointed Isaac Charles Parker, a Republican office holder from Missouri with an impeccable reputation, to the Court in order to clean up the prior stain of corruption and to bring law and order to the Western District. At the time of his appointment, Judge Parker (35 years old) was the youngest judge on the federal bench and served on the court from 1875 until his death in 1896. During this period, the Western District of Arkansas was one of the busiest federal courts in the entire country.

In Judge Parker's 21 years on the bench, 13,490 felony charges were docketed, including 344 charges carrying the death penalty. Since there were no state courts in the Indian Territory (only tribal courts), the United States District court had original jurisdiction over murder charges, an oddity for the federal courts Judge Parker sentenced 160 defendants to the Fort Smith gallows, and 79 of these defendants were actually hanged to death. In another oddity, no federal court had appellate jurisdiction over Judge Parker, and the only avenue for relief from a death sentence in his court was through presidential pardon; Congress remedied this in 1889 and gave the United States Supreme Court appellate jurisdiction over death sentences from Judge Parker's court.

Clayton served as the United States Attorney in Judge Parker's court from 1874 until 1893, with the exception of the four years comprising the first non-consecutive term of Democratic President Grover Cleveland. During his 14 years in this position, Clayton had charge of over 10,000 cases (including misdemeanors) tried before the court and, during that time, he convicted 80 men of murder—a number greater than any other prosecutor in the United States—and 40 of these men were executed. Clayton was known as "the ablest prosecutor in the Southwest." During Judge Parker's eventful first year with the Court, Clayton obtained capital convictions in 15 out of 18 murder cases. On September 3, 1875, Judge Parker ordered a mass hanging of six men at once on the Fort Smith gallows.

During his time with Judge Parker, Clayton had many interesting cases involving some of the most notorious criminals of the time. Clayton sent the infamous Belle Starr and her husband to federal prison for horse theft, and, upon her release, Starr plotted but failed to carry out an assassination attempt on Clayton during a Wild West Show at the Sebastian County, Arkansas Fair. This incident was later dramatized in 1961 on the television show Death Valley Days in an episode entitled "A Bullet for the D.A." Clayton was also the original prosecutor in the famous case of United States v. Allen, which was reported in the United States Supreme Court reporters as Allen v. United States, 164 U.S. 492, 17 S.Ct. 154 (1896). The Allen case is well-known to present-day trial attorneys for its discussion of the Allen charge, given to deadlocked juries in an attempt to avoid a hung jury.

Clayton also enjoyed a very successful legal career in Fort Smith during the years that he was not serving as United States Attorney. He handled both civil and criminal cases while in the private practice of law, including cases in front of the United States Supreme Court. One of Clayton's most famous cases involved his defense of legendary U.S. Marshal Bass Reeves against charges of murdering his posse cook. Reeves, one of the only black U.S. Marshals in the United States, had worked closely with Clayton while Clayton was still the U.S. Attorney, and Clayton was able to convince a jury to acquit Bass in a trial in front of Judge Parker.

== Career in the Indian Territory and Oklahoma ==
When William McKinley was elected President in 1896, he appointed Clayton as a United States federal judge for the newly created federal court for the Central District of the Indian Territory. Clayton moved to McAlester, the site of the new federal court for the Central District. Congress had created this court in an effort to relieve the overworked Western District of Arkansas of some of its huge caseload, although Judge Parker was upset with this stripping of his authority. When Oklahoma became a state in 1907, Congress created a new set of federal District Courts and dissolved the old Indian Territory District Courts, causing Clayton to lose his federal judgeship. During his 10 years as a federal judge, Clayton had issued important decisions defining Indian rights, which had long-term effects on the future history of Oklahoma.

Clayton had been involved in a scandal related to an alleged Oklahoma land grab in 1889. The charges were made by Democrats in 1889, after President Benjamin Harrison had nominated Clayton for re-appointment to his United States Attorney position, following the Grover Cleveland interregnum period. No formal action was ever taken on the charges, and the United States Senate confirmed President Harrison's nomination of Clayton. Former Oklahoma governor and supreme court Justice, Robert L. Williams, wrote a biography of Clayton, saying that Clayton's motto as a judge was, "Neither shall an innocent man be punished, nor shall one guilty man go free."

In 1907, President Theodore Roosevelt appointed Clayton to serve on the Oklahoma Districting and Canvassing Board. Clayton had also been a delegate selected to write the new constitution for the State of Oklahoma. After his retirement from the federal bench, Clayton resumed the practice of law in McAlester with his son. Clayton died in McAlester on December 14, 1920 and was interred at the Fort Smith National Cemetery.

== In popular culture ==
The actor Don Haggerty was cast as Clayton in the 1961 episode, "A Bullet for the D.A.", on the syndicated television anthology series, Death Valley Days, hosted by Stanley Andrews. Carole Mathews played as Belle Starr recently released from federal prison, who unsuccessfully plots the revenge assassination of Clayton during a Wild West show in Fort Smith.

== See also ==
- Clayton family
