= Brindletails =

The Brindletails (alternatively spelled "Brindle Tails" or "Brindle-tails") were a Reconstruction era faction of the Republican Party of Arkansas. A liberal faction, it was aligned with the national Liberal Republican movement. It was by Joseph Brooks, with its monicker was derived by a description of Brooks's voice as sounding like a "Brindletail bull".

The faction were rivals to the so-called Minstrel faction of the Arkansas state Republican Party, who were backed by national "regular" (mainstream) Republican leadership. In 1874, the Brooks-Baxter War saw a power struggle between opposing claims to the governorship by Brooks and Elisha Baxter, during which leading Minstrel politicians supported Brooks's unsuccessful attempt to assume the governorship (ending the Brindletail–Minstrel schism in the state's Republican party).

== History ==
=== Break with Governor Clayton and 1870 state election ===
Joseph Brooks broke with Arkansas Governor Powell Clayton (a fellow Republican) criticizing Clayton and Clayton's political machine for taking moderate positions. Brooks pushed for the state government to take a direct role in shaping the state's economy and society. Brooks had previously been one of the most outspoken delegates of the 1868 convention that wrote the new state constitution, at the time a proponent of Reconstruction policies.

During the course of the 1870 Arkansas legislative session, Powell assembled an anti-Clayton slate for that year's elections. Brooks himself ran for a state senate seat in Pulaski County, Arkansas. He was initially certified the winner of his state senate race, but the Senate reversed its certification of his win and instead seated his Democratic opponent Wilshire Riley. Coalescing in support of Clayton and aligning themselves with the national "Regular" (mainstream) Republican leadership were the Minstrels. This Republican schism led to Arkansas having three major political factions in its electoral politics: the Brindletails, the Minstrels, and the Democratic Party.

Brooks was a newcomer to Arkansas ("carpetbagger", as newcomers were often were derided), as were many of the Brindletail faction's early supporters.

=== 1872 election ===
In May 1872, the Brindletails held a convention to nominate their own candidates for the 1872 state elections. Brooks was nominated in the gubernatorial election. Brooks and the Brindletails ultimately organized into their own political party for the election ("Reform").

The Brindletails and their Reform party aligned with the national Liberal Republican Party, which ran its own ticket (led by Horace Greeley) in that year's presidential election. The Liberal Republicans had initially sought to organize an affiliated state party in Arkansas, but found this difficult due to the Reform Party having already been organized and seeking the same voters that the Liberal Republicans were hoping to court in the presidential election. They initially founded a state party that, despite having few members, sent a full delegation to the Liberal Republican National Convention, before the Brindletails's Reform Party became affiliated with the national Liberal Republicans

In the gubernatorial election, Brooks faced Republican nominee Elisha Baxter, aligned with the Minstrel/Regular Republican faction. There was no candidate nominated by the Democratic Party or Conservative Republicans in the gubernatorial election, leaving the election a two-man race between Brooks and Baxter. The state's Democratic Party (at the time branded the "Democratic–Conservative Party") decided in mid-1872 not to run a statewide ticket in the interest of there being undivded opposition against "Regular" Republicans. The decision by Democrats to not run a statewide ticket came after significant debate among leading Democrats, some of whom had objected to supporting Brooks as much as they objected to the Clayton-aligned Baxter.

In an effort to win the 1872 elections, Brooks and the Brindletails worked to garner the support of Scalawags (who had been loyalists to the cause of the Confederacy) by promising the re-enfranchisement of all who had been disenfranchised as voters due to their support of the Confederacy during the American Civil War. Brooks established positive relations with the state Democratic Party in order to earn Democratic voter support. Brooks also pivoted from his previous backing of Reconstruction policies in an effort to win support for his election. He centered much of his campaign rhetoric on lambasting Clayton's administration as being rife with corruption. In the elections, Brooks and the Brindletails received strong support from many African Americans, Democrats, and scalawags.

The machine headed by Clayton (by then no longer governor, having become a U.S. senator) used the powers of the governorship –still held by a Clayton ally– (such as the appointment of election registrars and election judges) to ensure the election would be administrated in a manner more favorable to the Minstrels ticket.

Brooks lost, receiving 38,415 votes to Baxter's 41,681. Brooks attempted to challenge the election results through the state legislature, but with Minstrels having control of both chambers of the Arkansas General Assembly this proved fruitless.

=== Brooks–Baxter War ===
After Baxter took office in March 1873, Brooks attempted to undo Baxter's victory through litigation, initially without success. J. R. Montgomery (the Attorney General of Arkansas) filed a challenge to Baxter's governorship in June 1873, filing a lawsuit requesting that the Arkansas Supreme Court issue a quo warranto writ requiring that Baxter to prove the validity of his claim to the governorship. The Chief Justice of the court was John McClure, a former ally of Clayton (who Clayton had appointed to the court), who re-aligned himself with Brooks after Governor Baxter, in an effort to win over support of moderate Democrats, removed the state printing contract from McClure's Daily Republican newspaper and awarded it to the Arkansas Gazette). Those aligned with Brooks hoped that McClure might be able to deliver a court decision in his favor, but the court instead denied the requested writ in a ruling which McClure dissented to. Also in June, Baxter filed a complaint against Baxter (Brooks v. Baxter) in the Pulaski County Circuit Court claiming Baxter had usurped his office without proper claim to it. Baxter responded by filing a demurrer. No further action on the complaint occurred for months thereafter, with the case remaining buried in the court's docket.

As his governorship went on, Baxter lost a sizable number of his previous political allies after he appointed a number of conservative Democrats to state offices as governor. This and other actions Baxter took in aims of growing his popularity with voters beyond his political base of support ultimately upset and distanced many that had previously been base supporters of his. Some disaffected allies joined forces with Brooks and the Brindletails to attempt to depose Baxter from the governorship.

In 1874, after Democrats saw successes in special elections, calls arose for a convention to re-write the state's constitution. Despite such a convention being likely to result in the abandonment of Reconstruction principles included in the 1868 constriction, Baxter voiced support for a convention, alarming many of his political allies. Among those alarmed were the state's U.S. Senators: Powell Clayton (the former governor) and Stephen W. Dorsey. Later that month, Baxter declared that the previous issuing of railroad bonds by the Clayton administration (including $400,000 he personally held) had violated the state's constitution, and that his administration would not issue any further bonds. This threatened to upend the Republicans' previous plans for the state's economic reconstruction, and also would harm railroad companies that Senator Dorsey was linked to. This motivated Clayton, Dorsey, and the entire remainder of the state's Republican leadership to break away from Baxter and realign themselves in support of Brooks's claim to the governorship.

Brooks and his newfound allies sought to try legal claims before a friendlier judge, and persuaded a friendly judge to take up Brooks's Brooks v. Baxter lawsuit (which had been filed ten months prior). On April 15, 1874, the court ruled that Baxter had been the rightful winner of the election and legal governor of the state. Brooks declared that this ruling made him governor. Both those supporting Brooks's claim and those supporting Baxter's claim to the governorship assembled militia's in the days that followed, and combat broke-out between these rival camps in what has been dubbed the "Brooks–Baxter War". Fighting occurred across the state, but state capital of Little Rock and surrounding Pulaski County was the epicenter of these hostilities. Both Brooks loyalist and Baxter loyalist for President Ulysses S. Grant to have the federal government assist them in settling the matter. After a month of hostilities, President Grant intervene on May 15, 1874, siding with Baxter. To appease Brooks and his allies, he appointed Brooks to the then-important office of Little Rock postmaster.

With leading former Minstrel politicians having united with Brindletails to support Brooks's claim to the governorship, and with Baxter having effectively become a Republican in name only (even being offered the Democratic nomination in the 1874 Arkansas gubernatorial election), the Republican schism between these two camps had ended.

== Notable figures ==
Notable figures who aligned themselves with the Brindletail faction included:

- Joseph Brooks
- Edward Allen Fulton
- D. J. Smith –1872 nominee for Lieutenant Governor
