= 1872 Arkansas gubernatorial election =

- November 5, 1872
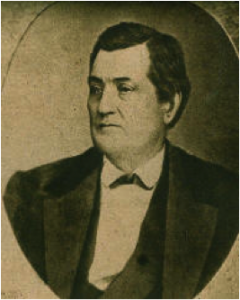

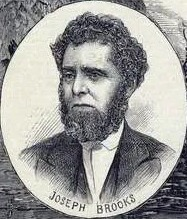
Nominee	Elisha Baxter	Joseph Brooks
Party	Republican	Reform
Popular vote	41,775 (Note: Baxter is stated as receiving 41,808 votes, however, the total number of votes in every county adds up to 41,775.) (Note: Pulaski County reports votes separately for variations of the candidates' names. These have been combined.)	38,909
Percentage	51.77%	48.22%
- Baxter: 50%-60% 60%-70% 70%-80% 80%-90% Brooks: 50%-60% 60%-70% 70%-80% 80%-90% 90%-100% Tie; No data
Governor before election
Powell Clayton
Republican
Elected Governor
Elisha Baxter
Republican

The 1872 Arkansas gubernatorial election was held on November 5, 1872, in order to elect the Governor of Arkansas. Republican nominee Elisha Baxter defeated Joseph Brooks, who was nominated by the Liberal Republican-affiliated state Reform Party. The results of the election led to the Brooks-Baxter War, in which Brooks unsuccessfully attempted to take control of the state government with force.

== Democratic primary ==
=== Declined ===
- Augustus Garland, attorney who had served as delegate to the Arkansas Secession Convention, Provisional Confederate Congress, and in the Congress of the Confederate States

== General election ==
On election day, November 5, 1872, Republican nominee Elisha Baxter won the election by a margin of 2,866 votes against his opponent Liberal Republican nominee Joseph Brooks, thereby retaining Republican control over the office of Governor. Democrats did not nominate a candidate and many supported Baxter. Baxter was sworn in as the 10th Governor of Arkansas on January 6, 1873. The results in Greene and Poinsett Counties were not counted and the results in Richland Township, Yell County were rejected. Scott County did not hold an election after the poll and registration books were stolen from the County Clerk's office.

=== Results ===
1872 Arkansas gubernatorial election
Party	Candidate	Votes	%
Republican	Elisha Baxter	41,775	51.77
Liberal Republican	Joseph Brooks	38,909	48.22
Write-in	Scattering	4	0.00
Total votes		80,688	100.00
Republican hold			

==== Results by county ====
Results by county
County	Elisha Baxter		Joseph Brooks		Scattering		Total
County	Votes	%	Votes	%	Votes	%	Total
Arkansas	658	51.77%	613	48.23%	0	0.00%	1271
Ashley	730	48.60%	772	51.40%	0	0.00%	1502
Benton	241	17.28%	1154	82.72%	0	0.00%	1395
Boone	202	21.89%	721	78.11%	0	0.00%	923
Bradley	403	35.20%	742	64.80%	0	0.00%	1145
Calhoun	275	35.99%	489	64.01%	0	0.00%	764
Carroll	277	46.09%	324	53.91%	0	0.00%	601
Chicot	1657	85.59%	279	14.41%	0	0.00%	1936
Clark	1329	62.42%	800	37.58%	0	0.00%	2129
Columbia	761	39.05%	1188	60.95%	0	0.00%	1949
Conway	151	39.32%	233	60.68%	0	0.00%	384
Craighead	146	22.19%	512	77.81%	0	0.00%	658
Crawford	932	61.36%	587	38.64%	0	0.00%	1519
Crittenden	1911	86.63%	295	13.37%	0	0.00%	2206
Cross	303	35.86%	542	64.14%	0	0.00%	845
Dallas	322	31.54%	699	68.46%	0	0.00%	1021
Desha	764	64.75%	416	35.25%	0	0.00%	1180
Drew	482	27.85%	1249	72.15%	0	0.00%	1731
Franklin	528	67.43%	255	32.57%	0	0.00%	783
Fulton	152	26.12%	430	73.88%	0	0.00%	582
Grant	204	32.69%	420	67.31%	0	0.00%	624
Greene	No results (Note: Green and Poinsett counties had their results rejected and Scott County did not hold an election.)						
Hempstead	1356	67.23%	661	32.77%	0	0.00%	2017
Hot Spring	268	26.83%	731	73.17%	0	0.00%	999
Independence	818	57.69%	600	42.31%	0	0.00%	1418
Izard	200	24.42%	619	75.58%	0	0.00%	819
Jackson	424	55.57%	339	44.43%	0	0.00%	763
Jefferson	2860	73.58%	1027	26.42%	0	0.00%	3887
Johnson	128	62.75%	76	37.25%	0	0.00%	204
Lafayette	1601	73.34%	582	26.66%	0	0.00%	2183
Lawrence	122	17.89%	560	82.11%	0	0.00%	682
Lincoln	1000	56.05%	784	43.95%	0	0.00%	1784
Little River	505	65.93%	261	34.07%	0	0.00%	766
Sarber	792	74.30%	274	25.70%	0	0.00%	1066
Madison	497	48.44%	529	51.56%	0	0.00%	1026
Marion	162	19.85%	654	80.15%	0	0.00%	816
Mississippi	386	48.68%	407	51.32%	0	0.00%	793
Monroe	862	54.11%	731	45.89%	0	0.00%	1593
Montgomery	173	30.73%	390	69.27%	0	0.00%	563
Nevada	511	36.16%	902	63.84%	0	0.00%	1413
Newton	332	66.27%	169	33.73%	0	0.00%	501
Ouachita	1073	50.00%	1073	50.00%	0	0.00%	2146
Perry	167	67.89%	79	32.11%	0	0.00%	246
Phillips	3959	80.91%	934	19.09%	0	0.00%	4893
Pike	233	67.15%	114	32.85%	0	0.00%	347
Poinsett	No results						
Polk	121	26.30%	339	73.70%	0	0.00%	460
Pope	531	62.84%	314	37.16%	0	0.00%	845
Prairie	589	34.67%	1110	65.33%	0	0.00%	1699
Pulaski	3041	48.29%	3253	51.65%	4	0.06%	6298
Randolph	289	57.80%	211	42.20%	0	0.00%	500
Saline	9	1.19%	745	98.81%	0	0.00%	754
Scott	No results						
Searcy	380	78.19%	106	21.81%	0	0.00%	486
Sebastian	1009	63.10%	590	36.90%	0	0.00%	1599
Sevier	265	38.52%	423	61.48%	0	0.00%	688
Sharp	124	19.02%	528	80.98%	0	0.00%	652
St. Francis	792	48.41%	844	51.59%	0	0.00%	1636
Union	1347	61.65%	838	38.35%	0	0.00%	2185
Van Buren	138	50.36%	136	49.64%	0	0.00%	274
Washington	723	39.92%	1088	60.08%	0	0.00%	1811
White	335	16.94%	1642	83.06%	0	0.00%	1977
Woodruff	688	58.55%	487	41.45%	0	0.00%	1175
Yell	537	34.07%	1039	65.93%	0	0.00%	1576
Total	41775	51.77%	38909	48.22%	4	0.00%	80688
