= Dorothy Burr Thompson =

American archaeologist (1900–2001)

Dorothy Burr Thompson in 1923

Dorothy Burr Thompson (August 19, 1900 – May 10, 2001) was an American classical archaeologist and art historian at Bryn Mawr College and a leading authority on Hellenistic terracotta figurines.

== Early life ==
Thompson was the elder of two daughters of a prominent Philadelphia family. Her father was attorney Charles Henry Burr Jr. and her mother was novelist and biographer Anna Robeson Brown. Her grandfather was noted orator and lawyer Henry Armitt Brown. Early in life Thompson studied the Classics, attending Miss Hill's School in Center City, Pa., and The Latin School in Philadelphia. She began her study of Latin at age 9 and ancient Greek at 12.

At age 13, she took a Grand Tour of Europe, visiting museums and monuments of Europe. In 1919 she began her studies at Bryn Mawr College where she took courses with Rhys Carpenter and Mary Hamilton Swindler. She graduated summa cum laude in 1923, the first graduate with a major in Greek and archaeology, and was awarded the college's European Fellowship. She used the fellowship to study at the American School of Classical Studies at Athens, working on excavations with Carl Blegen at Phlius.

== Career ==
In 1925 Thompson discovered a beehive tomb that proved to be the burial place of the king and queen of Midea. She completed her Ph.D. at Bryn Mawr College in 1931; it entailed a study of the 117 Hellenistic terracotta figures from Myrina in the Museum of Fine Arts, Boston.

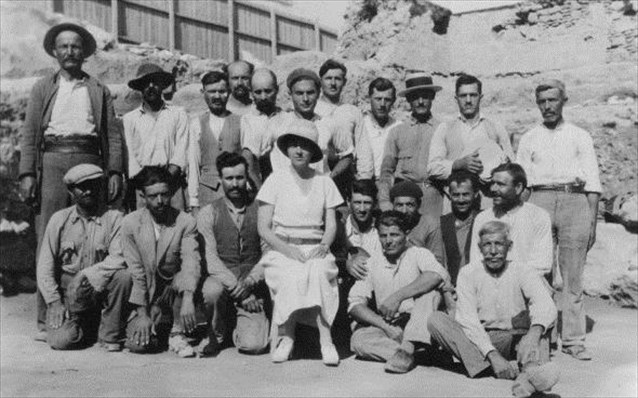
Dorothy Burr Thompson with her excavation crew at the Athenian Agora, 1933

In 1932 Thompson was appointed the first female Fellow of the Athenian Agora excavations.

The dig's assistant director of field work was the Canadian archaeologist Homer Thompson; the two married in 1934. Homer Thompson accepted positions as curator of the classical collection at the Royal Ontario Museum of Archaeology and assistant professor in fine arts at the University of Toronto. Burr Thompson had three daughters between 1935 and 1938, but found time to remain involved during the same period in the Athenian Agora excavations, where she discovered the garden of the Temple of Hephaistos in 1936.

In 1946 her husband accepted a chair at the Institute for Advanced Study in Princeton, New Jersey, and Burr Thompson served as acting director of the Royal Ontario Museum until she moved to Princeton, New Jersey in 1947. At Princeton she continued to publish and carry out her research. She published the book An Ancient Shopping Center: The Athenian Agora in 1971. In 1987 she was awarded the Gold Medal for distinguished achievement by the Archaeological Institute of America. She died in Hightstown, New Jersey and is buried in West Laurel Hill Cemetery.

== Publications ==
- Dissertation: Terra-cottas from Myrina in the Museum of Fine Arts, Boston, Bryn Mawr College, 1931; [issued as book of same title] Vienna: A. Holzhausens Nachfolger, 1934.
- with Davidson, Gladys R. and Talcott, Lucy: Small Objects from the Pnyx, 2 vols, Baltimore: American School of Classical Studies at Athens, 1943–56.
- with Frantz, Alison: Miniature Sculpture from the Athenian Agora, Princeton, NJ: American School of Classical Studies at Athens, 1959.
- Three Centuries of Hellenistic Terracottas, in: "Hesperia" 31, 1962, 244–262.
- with Griswold, Ralph: Garden Lore of Ancient Athens, Princeton, NJ: American School of Classical Studies at Athens, 1963.
- Troy: the Terra-Cotta Figurines of the Hellenistic Period, 1963.
- An Ancient Shopping Center: the Athenian Agora, Princeton, NJ: American School of Classical Studies at Athens, 1971.
- Ptolemaic Oinochoai and Portraits in Faience: Aspects of the Ruler-Cult, Oxford: Clarendon Press, 1973.
- with Homer Thompson and Susan Rotroff: Hellenistic Pottery and Terracottas, Princeton, NJ: American School of Classical Studies at Athens, 1987.

== See also ==
- Mary Hamilton Swindler
