= Bridgeford House =

Historic building in Eureka Springs, Arkansas

Bridgeford House is a historic building in Eureka Springs, Arkansas that now is a five-room bed and breakfast.

== History ==
The Bridgeford House was built after the American Civil War by Captain John Bridgeford. John Bridgeford was married to Mary Bridgeford and they were both prominent members of the community. They managed the Pence House, a small hotel located on Main Street which later burned down. The historic home is located on Spring Street in the largest historic district in the United States. Eureka Springs was inducted into the National Register of Historic Places in 1970 and then the house itself is also listed on the registry. The historic home has been operating as one of the most popular bed and breakfasts in Eureka Springs since the 1980s.

== The locale ==
The town of Eureka Springs was formed in 1879 and became a well known destination and a sign of economic prosperity because of the building of the Eureka Springs Railroad. The town also gained notoriety because of the supposed healing powers of the natural springs nearby for which Eureka Springs was named. The people of Eureka Springs have worked to maintain the historical integrity of the town as a popular visitor destination. The area of Eureka Springs has a number of tourist destinations like the Christ of the Ozarks statue, the Thorncrown Chapel, Eureka Springs Historical District tours, The Great Passion Play, and Belle of the Ozarks.
