= William Clayton (colonist) =

William Clayton (December 9, 1632 – 1689) was a settler of the Pennsylvania colony, one of the first councilors of Pennsylvania and a judge of the city of Philadelphia.

== Early life ==
Clayton was baptized on December 9, 1632, in Boxgrove, England, the son of William Clayton and Joan Smith.

His mother died before he was a teenager, and in 1653 he married Prudence Lanckford, a daughter of William Lanckford, in St Pancras, London. Clayton became a carpenter by trade and a follower of the Quaker religion.

== Pennsylvania ==
Clayton was a founder of the Pennsylvania colony, serving as an original commissioner for William Penn, as well as one of Philadelphia's first judges. He was appointed to the provincial Council in 3 Aug 1681, and later was elected to the council in 1683, serving until 30 Mar 1686. On 19 Aug 1684, he was commissioned as a JP in Philadelphia County.

=== Penn Company Commissioner ===
In 1677, Clayton set sail for America, arriving in New York after being selected by Penn to serve as a commissioner. He oversaw the clearance of Indian land titles acquired by Penn in the West Jersey colony near present day Burlington, New Jersey. In 1678, he purchased 1000 acres in Marcus Hook, Pennsylvania. In 1681, his family removed to Chichester, Pennsylvania, where Clayton had secured a 500-acre land patent.

=== Chester and Philadelphia judge ===
In 1681, he presided over the first Upland Court in Chester, Pennsylvania and eventually was one of the first judges of nearby Philadelphia.

== Notable American relations ==
Notable descendants of Clayton are:

- Henry Armitt Brown, author and orator
- John Middletown Clayton, Republican congressman elect in Arkansas
- Powell Clayton, 9th governor of Arkansas
- Thomas J. Clayton, President Judge of the Thirty-Second Judicial District of Pennsylvania
- W.H.H. Clayton, United States federal judge
