= Governor Brooks =

Governor Brooks may refer to:

- Bryant Butler Brooks (1861–1944), 7th Governor of Wyoming
- John Brooks (governor) (1752–1825), 11th Governor of Massachusetts
- Joseph Brooks (politician) (1812–1877), self-declared Governor of Arkansas in 1874, following the disputed 1872 election
- Ralph G. Brooks (1898–1960), 29th Governor of Nebraska
