= W.H.H. Clayton House =

Historic house in Arkansas, United States

- W. H. H. Clayton House
- U.S. National Register of Historic Places
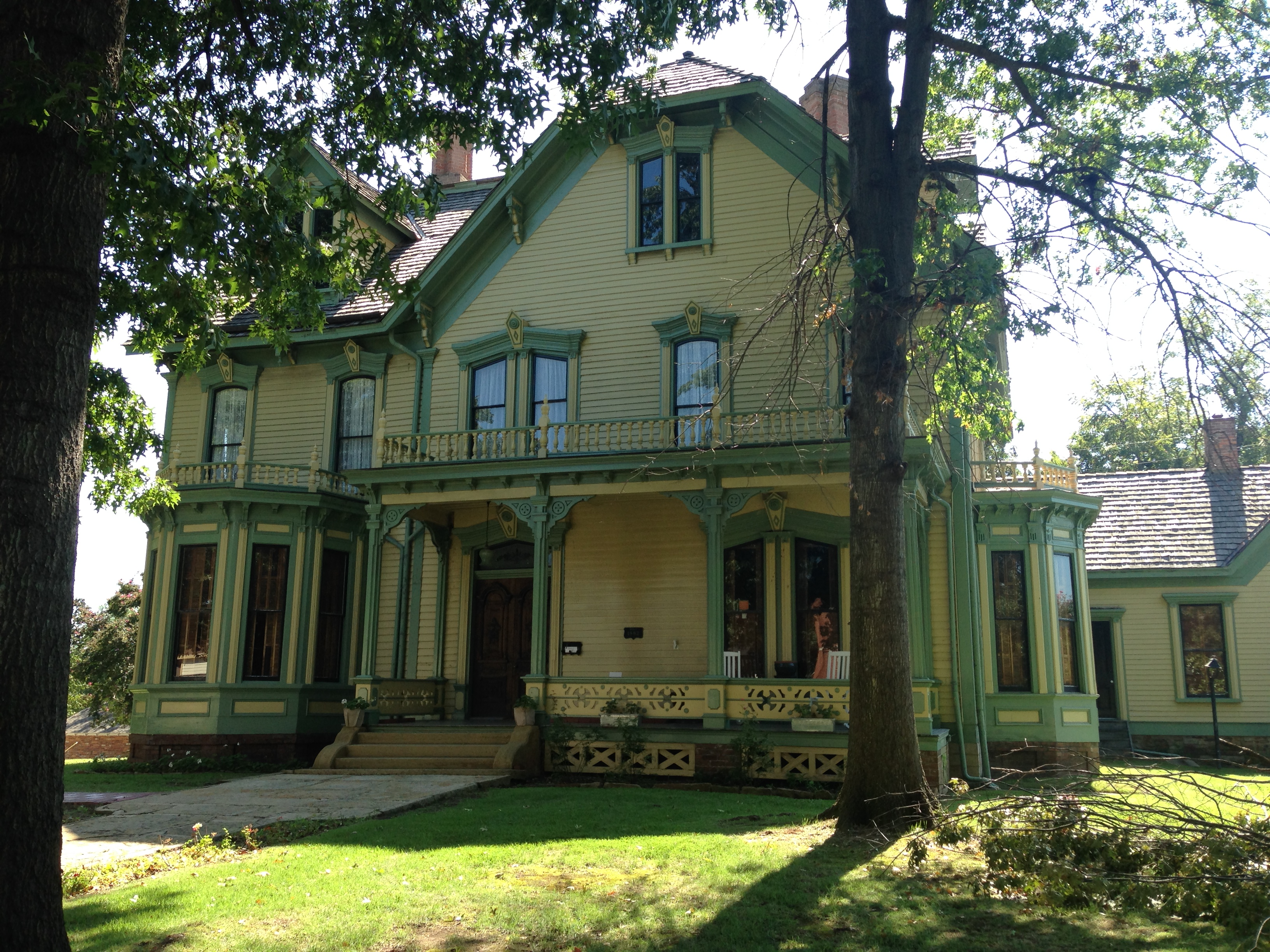

- Location within Arkansas Location within the United States
- Location: 514 N. 6th St., Fort Smith, Arkansas
- Coordinates: 35°23′30″N 94°25′15″W
- Area: less than one acre
- Built: 1874
- NRHP reference No.: 70000130
- Added to NRHP: September 4, 1970

The W.H.H. Clayton House, now the Clayton House Museum, is a historic house museum at 514 North 6th Street in Fort Smith, Arkansas. It is a 2 1/2-story L-shaped wood-frame structure, with a projecting front clipped-gable section. It has elaborate Victorian trim, including detailed window surrounds, paneled projecting bays on the front and side, and a porch with carved columns and brackets, and delicately turned balusters ringing the porch roof. The house was built in 1882 for W. H. H. Clayton, who served as a local prosecutor and was member of family prominent in state politics, and is one of the few high-quality houses of the period to survive. It is now a museum.

The house was the home of W.H.H. Clayton, United States Attorney for the United States District Court for the Western District of Arkansas and chief prosecutor in the court of "hanging judge" Isaac Parker.

The house was listed on the National Register of Historic Places in 1970.

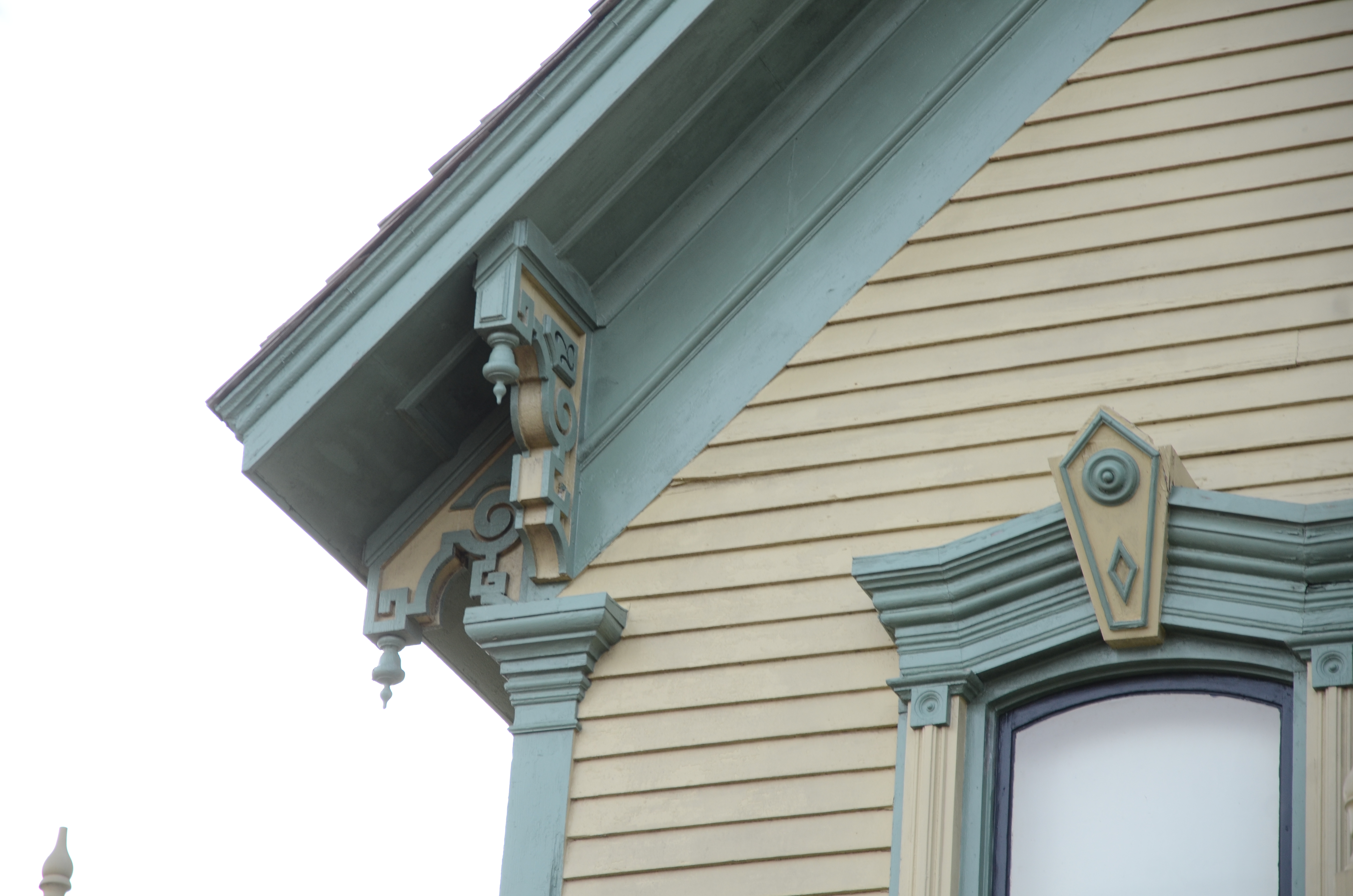
Cornices

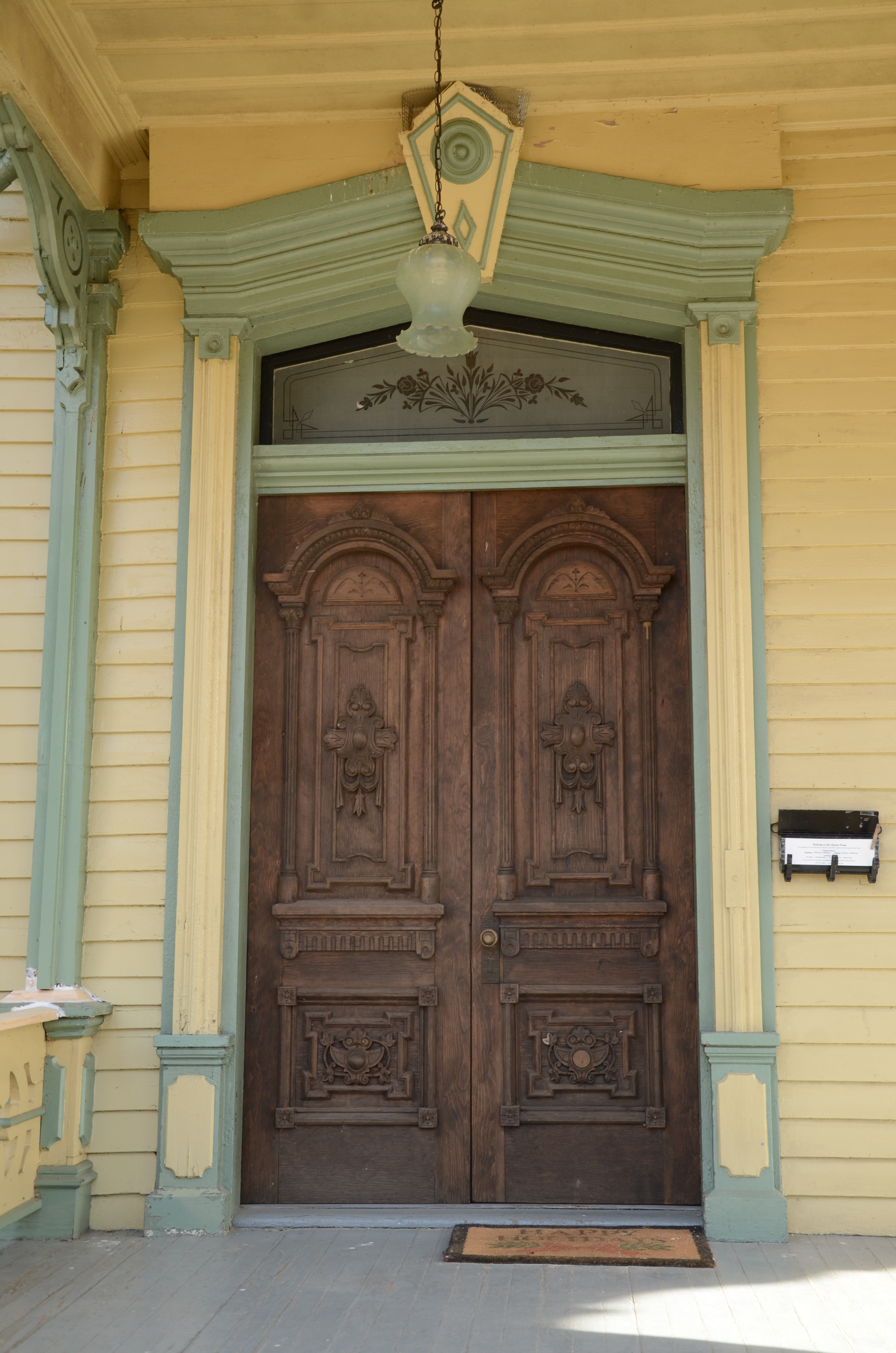
Front Entry

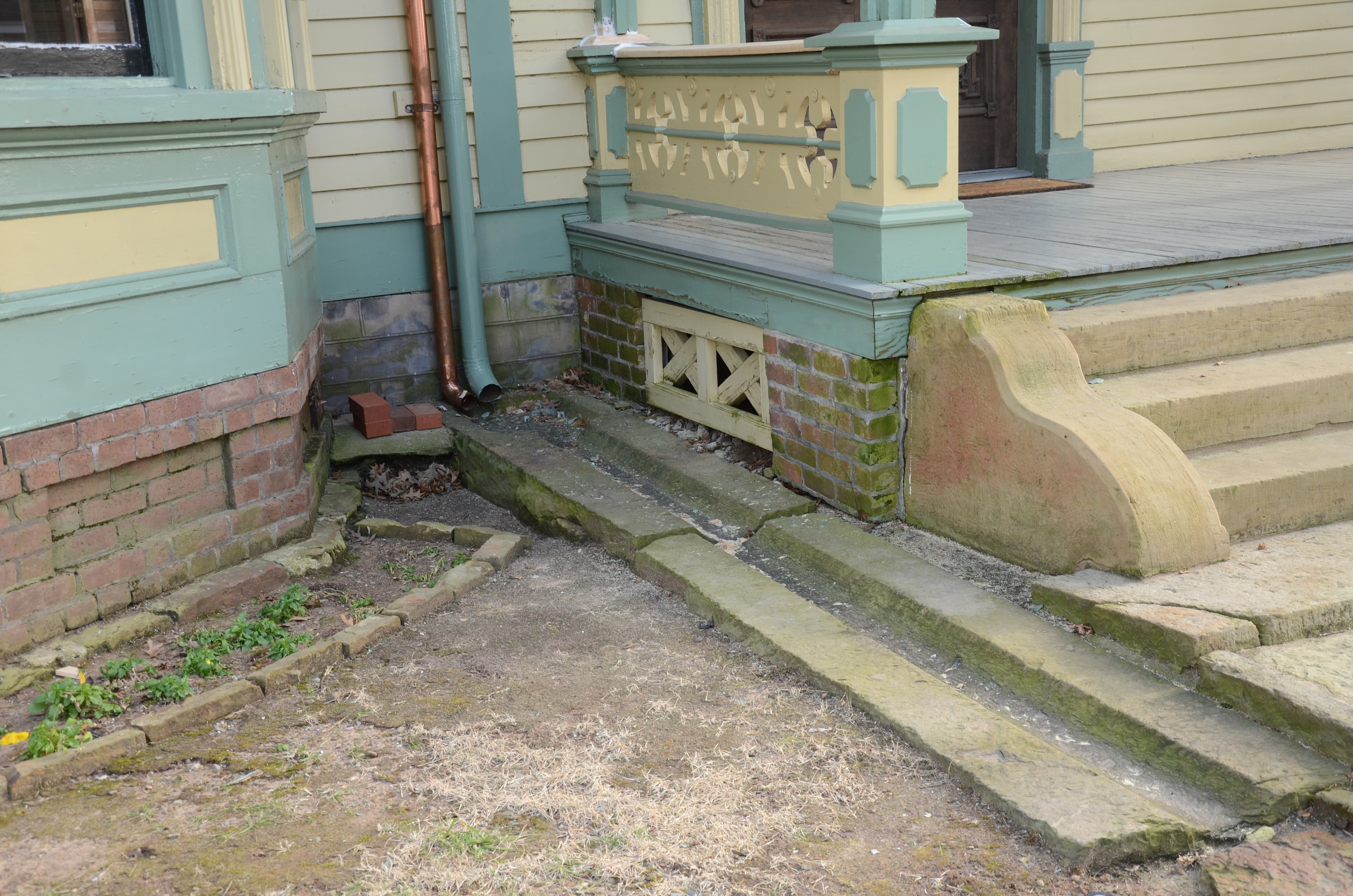
Hand Carved Limestone Guttering

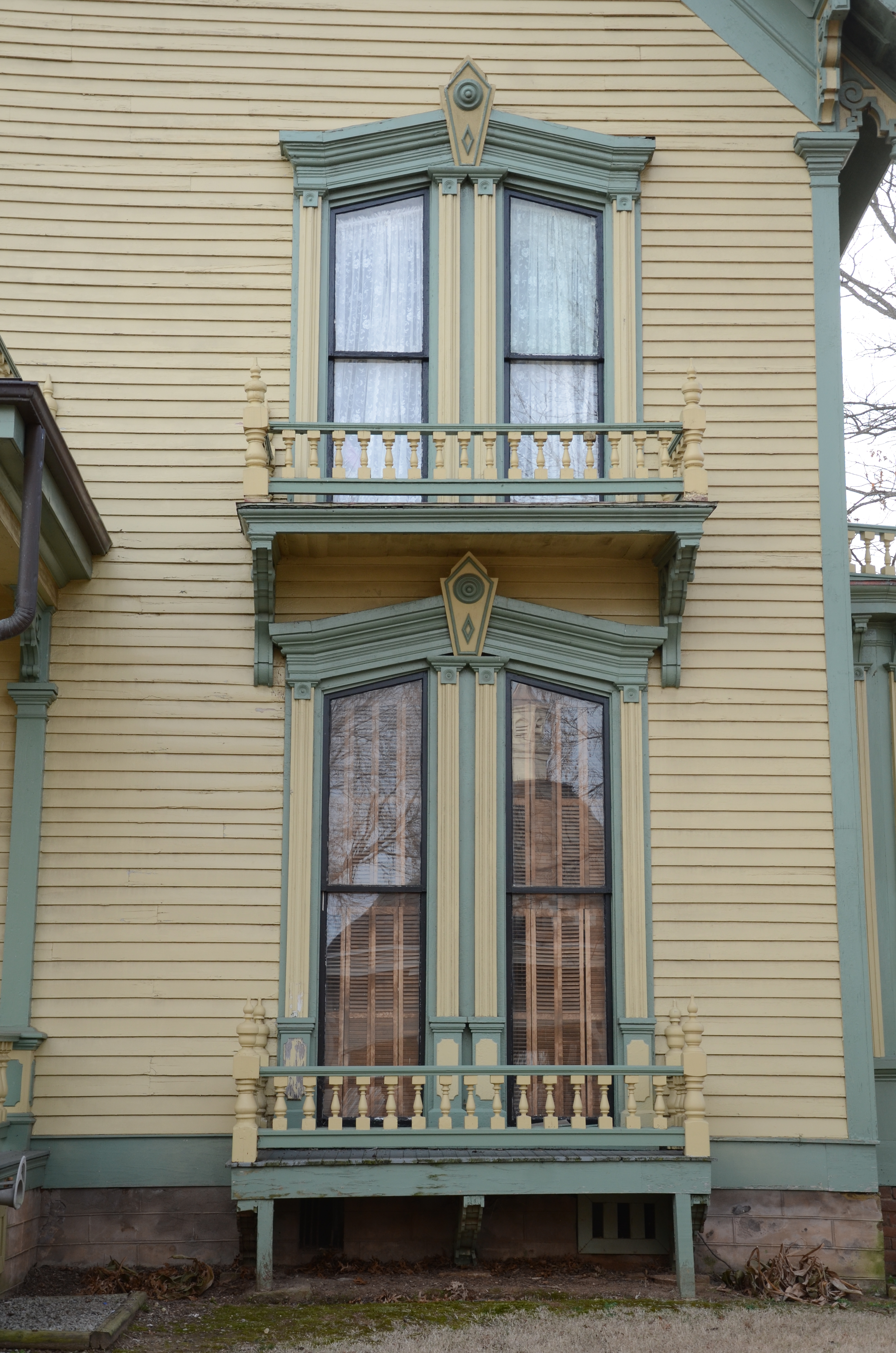
North Side

== See also ==
- National Register of Historic Places listings in Sebastian County, Arkansas
