= Anna Robeson Brown =

American writer (1873-1941)

Ann Robeson Brown
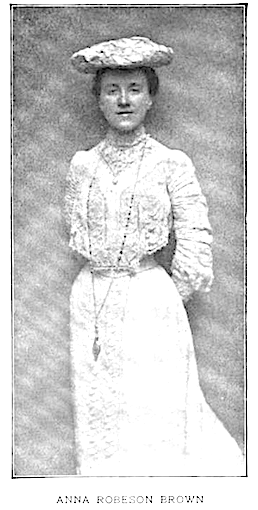
- Born: May 26, 1873
- Died: September 10, 1941 (aged 68)
- Resting place: West Laurel Hill Cemetery, Bala Cynwyd, Pennsylvania, U.S.
- Occupation: Writer
- Relatives: Henry Armitt Brown (father); Dorothy Burr Thompson (daughter)

Anna Robeson Brown Burr (May 26, 1873 – September 10, 1941) was an American writer of novels, poetry, stories, essays, and biographies. Her The Autobiography: A Critical and Comparative Study (1909), was the first book on the subject.

== Early life ==
Brown was born in 1873, to Josephine Baker and Henry Armitt Brown. She was a descendant of Charles Brockden Brown, who was also a writer.

== Career ==
Her novels include: Alain of Halfdene (1895); The Black Lamb (1896); A Cosmopolitan Comedy (1899); The House of Pan: A Romance (1899); The Immortal Garland (1900); The Millionaire's Son (1903); Truth and a Woman (1903); The Wine Press (1905); The Jessop Bequest (1907); The House on Charles Street (1921); The Wrong Move: A Romance (1923); The Great House in the Park (1924); Palludia (1928); Wind in the East (1933); and The Golden Quicksand: A Novel of Santa Fé (1936).

She also wrote non-fiction books, among them, The Autobiography: A Critical and Comparative Study (1909), "the first book on the subject"; Religious Confessions and Confessants (1914); The Portrait of a Banker: James Stillman, 1850-1918 (1927); and Weir Mitchell: His Life and Letters (1929).

Brown also wrote for periodicals including Ladies' Home Journal, Godey's Magazine, Lippincott's Magazine, and St. Nicholas Magazine.

== Personal life ==
Brown married lawyer Charles Henry Burr Jr. in 1899. They had two daughters, the elder being archaeologist Dorothy Burr Thompson. During World War I, Anna moved herself and her daughters to London to be closer to Charles who was doing work there. Charles Henry Burr Jr. died in 1925. She died in 1941, aged 68 years, from pneumonia. She is interred at West Laurel Hill Cemetery in Bala Cynwyd, Pennsylvania.

== Publications ==
- The House of Pan. A Romance., Philadelphia: J.B. Lippincott Company, 1899
- The Autobiography - A Critical and Comparative Study, Boston: Houghton Mifflin Company, 1909
- Religious Confessions and Confessants With a Chapter on the History of Introspection, Boston: Houghton Mifflin Company, 1914
- The Portrait of a Banker: James Stillman, 1850-1918, New York: Duffield & Company, 1927
- The City We Visit - Old Philadelphia, Philadelphia: J.B. Lippincott Company, 1926
