= Mary Hamilton Swindler =

American archaeologist (1884–1967)

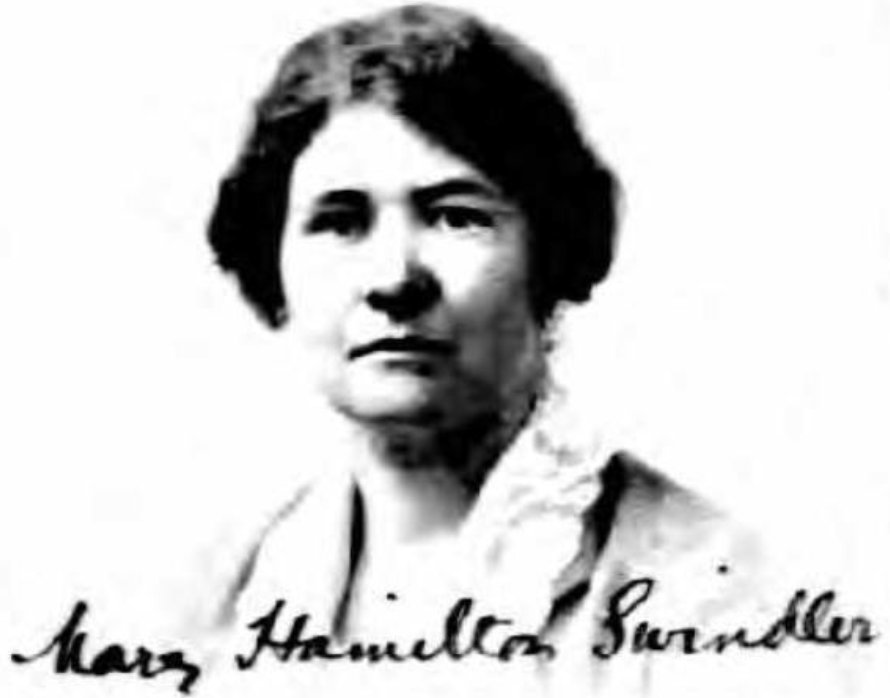
- Born: January 2, 1884; Bloomington, Indiana
- Died: January 16, 1967 (aged 83); Haverford, Pennsylvania
- Occupation: Archaeology educator
- Parent(s): Harrison T. Swindler; Ida M. Hamilton

Mary Hamilton Swindler (January 2, 1884 – January 16, 1967) was an American archaeologist, classical art scholar, author, and professor of classical archaeology, most notably at Bryn Mawr College, the University of Pennsylvania, and the University of Michigan. Swindler also founded the Ella Riegel Memorial Museum at Bryn Mawr College. She participated in various archaeological excavations in Greece, Egypt, and Turkey. The recipient of several awards and honors for her research, Swindler's seminal work was Ancient Painting, from the Earliest Times to the Period of Christian Art (1929).

== Early life and education ==
Mary Hamilton Swindler, nicknamed "Mayme", was born in Bloomington, Indiana, on January 2, 1884. Her parents were Harrison T. and Ida Hamilton Swindler. Swindler attended public school in Bloomington and described her youth as filled with activity: "playing football, doing circus stunts, riding a bicycle violently and expending surplus energy on athletics of various kinds."

Upon graduation from high school, Swindler attended Indiana University Bloomington, where she received a Bachelor of Arts degree in 1905 and a master's degree in 1906. She specialized in Greek, Latin, and archaeology studies.

Swindler continued her education at Bryn Mawr College. The college awarded Swindler a Greek fellowship in 1906–07. She was also the recipient of the Mary E. Garrett European Fellowship in 1909–10, which allowed her to pursue graduate studies at the University of Berlin and the American School of Classical Studies at Athens, Greece, before returning to Bryn Mawr. Swindler earned a doctoral degree from Bryn Mawr College in 1912 and joined the Bryn Mawr faculty.

== Career ==
Swindler began her teaching career as an instructor of Latin and archaeology at Bryn Mawr College in 1912. From 1931 until her retirement in 1949, she was a professor of classical archaeology at Bryn Mawr. In addition to her teaching responsibilities, Swindler founded the Ella Riegel Memorial Museum for Archaeology, also known as the Classical and Near Eastern Archaeology Collection, in 1940 and the Ella Riegel Study Collection at Bryn Mawr College. Dorothy Burr Thompson, a renowned student of Bryn Mawr, was influenced by Swindler. Swindler worked with Thompson on studies of ancient vases at the Bryn Mawr College Museum's Mediterranean Section. Swindler also organized Bryn Mawr's participation in archaeological expeditions to Cilicia in Tarsus, Turkey (1934–38).

From 1932 to 1936, Swindler was the first female editor-in-chief of the American Journal of Archaeology (its first issue was published in 1885). She also served as a consulting editor for the Encyclopædia Britannica.

Swindler wrote several books on early ancient art. Her seminal work, Ancient Painting, from the Earliest Times to the Period of Christian Art (1929), offered a comprehensive review the subject for scholars as well as students.

== Later years ==
In her later years, Swindler was appointed a research fellow at the University of Pennsylvania and taught archaeology at the University of Michigan, Ann Arbor, as well as Bryn Mawr College. After her retirement from Bryn Mawr College in 1949, Swindler continued to be involved with different archaeological sites. During the late 1940s and early 1950s, Swindler went on excavations to Greece, Egypt, and Turkey. She worked at the Gordium archaeology site in 1951.

Swindler was often called upon for consultation by the American Council of Learned Societies, Archaeological Institute of America, American School of Classical Studies, and the American Association of University Women.

== Death and legacy ==
Swindler died on January 16, 1967, in Haverford, Pennsylvania, of bronchopneumonia.

Swindler, who joined the faculty at Bryn Mawr College in 1912, was a noted professor of classical archaeology at the college and a scholar of ancient painting. She also founded the Ella Riegel Memorial Museum at Bryn Mawr. In addition, Swindler was the first woman editor of the American Journal of Archaeology (1932–46). In 1941, when she was awarded an honorary degree from Indiana University, Swindler became the first woman to deliver a commencement address at Indiana University.

== Awards and honors ==
Swindler was regarded as an authority on ancient Greek paintings and received numerous honors and awards, including the following:

- 1941 – honorary LL.D. degree from Indiana University.
- 1943 – elected member of the American Philosophical Society.
- 1951 – American Association of University Women (Achievement Award of $2,500).
- 1959 – American Council of Learned Societies (Special Award of $10,000).

== Affiliations ==
- Fellow of the Royal Society of Arts, London.
- Fellow of the German Archaeological Institute.

== Selected published works ==
- Another Vase by the Master of the Penthesilea Cylix (1909)
- Cretan Elements in the Cults and Ritual of Apollo (1913)
- The Bryn Mawr Collection of Greek Vases (1916)
- Ancient Painting from the Earliest Times to the Period of Christian Art (1929)
