= Edward Allen Fulton =

American politician

Edward Allen Fulton (c. 1833 - 1906) was an American newspaperman, abolitionist, postmaster, farmer, and politician. He represented Drew County, Arkansas in the Arkansas House of Representatives in 1871. After being enslaved in Missouri, he became an abolitionist and lived in Chicago. He returned to the south after the American Civil War. He was an advocate of civil rights for African Americans. He campaigned to be Arkansas Secretary of State. He survived an assassination attempt.

In 1884, after the Reconstruction era had ended, he launched an "independent Republican" newspaper called The Sun in Little Rock, Arkansas that offered allegiance to the Democrats then in power. Fulton was described as "Colored". He had been editor of the Arkansas Herald which became the merged to become the Herald-Mansion. He and editor Julian T. Bailey published The Sun newspaper. They were sued for libel by an official at Southland College near Helena.

An image of him was printed in the Cleveland Gazette December 3, 1887. He served in the Arkansas House of Representatives in 1871. He was the only African American to represent Drew County, Arkansas in the state legislature during Reconstruction.

== See also ==
- African American officeholders from the end of the Civil War until before 1900
