= Boone–Murphy House =

Historic house in Arkansas, United States

- U.S. National Register of Historic Places
- U.S. Historic district – Contributing property
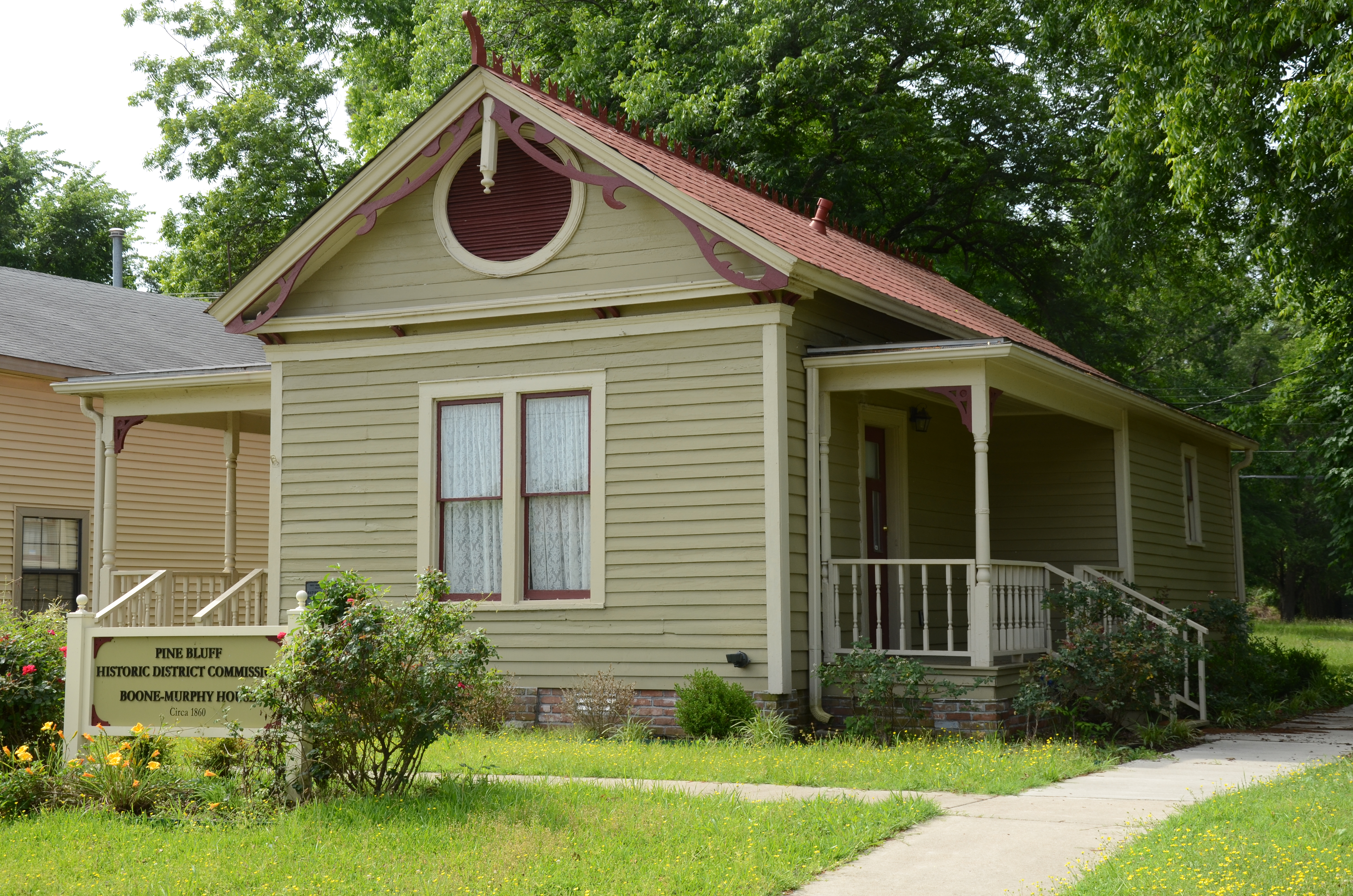
- Main façade of the Boone–Murphy House

- Location within Arkansas Location within the United States
- Location: 714 W. 4th Avenue, Pine Bluff, Arkansas
- Coordinates: 34°13′32″N 92°0′39″W
- Area: less than one acre
- Built: c. 1860
- Built by: Thomas A. Boone
- Architectural style: Central hall plan
- Restored: 2010 – 2013
- Restored by: Pine Bluff Historic District Commission
- Part of: Fifth Avenue Historic District
- NRHP reference No.: 79000442
- Added to NRHP: February 18, 1979

The Boone–Murphy House (also known as the Boone–Murphy–Moore House) is a historic house located in Pine Bluff, Arkansas.

== Description ==
It is a single-story, single-pile, wood-framed structure, with a front gable roof and weatherboard siding. Shed-roof additions extend to either side, and there is bargeboard trim on the gables.

== History ==
The house was built c. 1860 by Thomas A. Boone and was originally located at 702 W. Second Avenue.

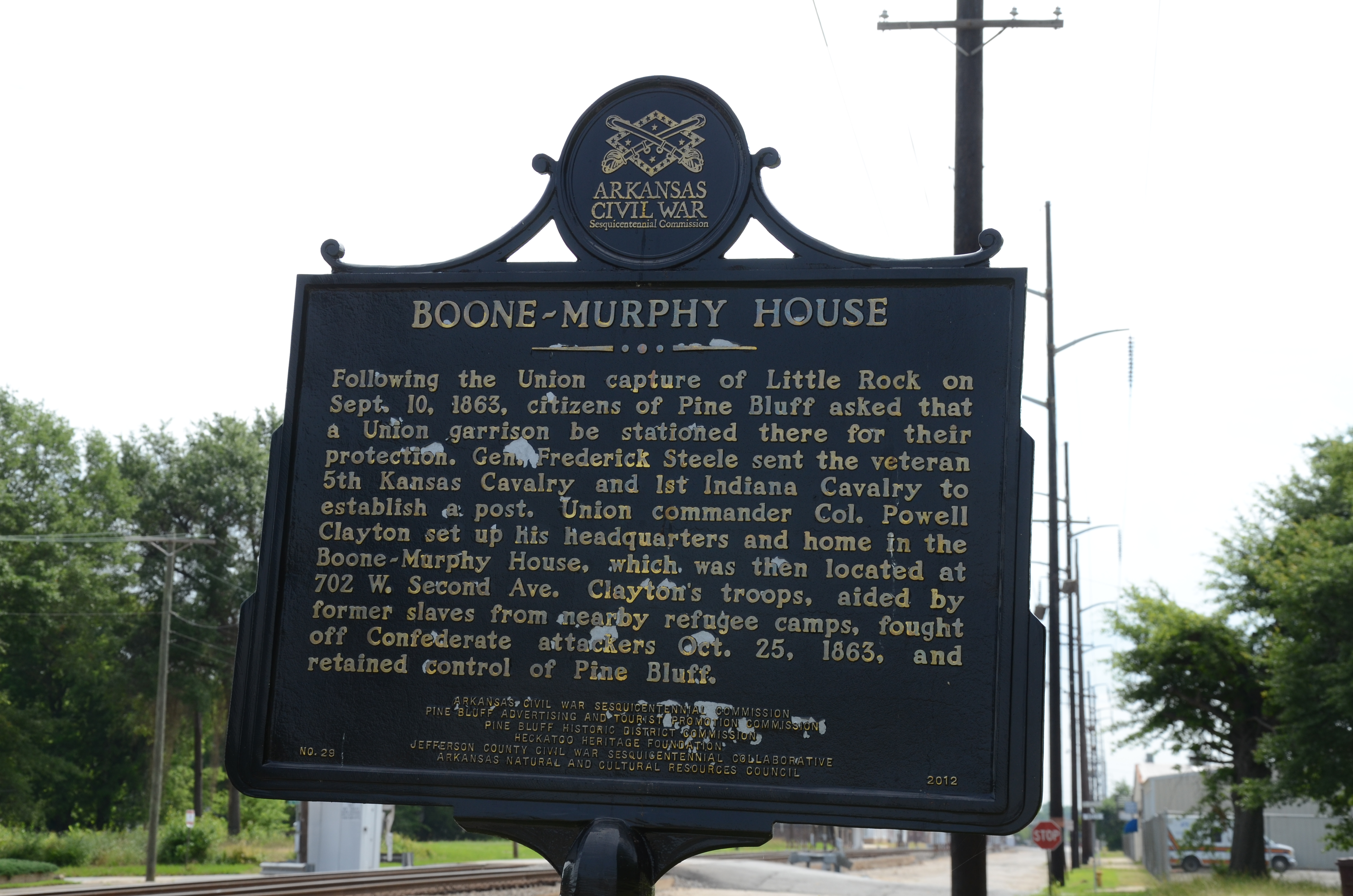
Civil War Sesquicentennial Marker

Following the evacuation of Little Rock by Confederate forces on September 10, 1863, the citizens of Pine Bluff asked that a Union garrison be stationed there for their protection. Union Army Major-General Frederick Steele sent the 5th Kansas Cavalry and 1st Indiana Cavalry to Pine Bluff to establish a garrison. Colonel Powell Clayton established his headquarters and home in the Boone-Murphy house. in 1863. In October 1863 a band of Confederate spies raided Clayton's headquarters. They were able to secure intelligence on Union army activities but failed to capture Clayton.

During Reconstruction, Clayton mortgaged the house to Robert S. Thompson and William H. Dupuy, and when the loan was not paid the house was sold to John P. Murphy. The Murphy's lived in the house until 1892. Following John Murphy's death, his widow remarried Charles F. Moore.

The Boone–Murphy House has been restored to a 1920s appearance and is owned and operated by the Heckatoo Heritage Foundation. In 2014, the house was used by a Pine Bluff Community Watch program. In 1977, the home was relocated to West 4th Avenue to ensure that it would be located in a historic district.

The house was listed on the National Register of Historic Places on February 18, 1979.

== See also ==
- National Register of Historic Places listings in Jefferson County, Arkansas
