= Southland College =

Private college in Negros Occidental, Philippines

- Motto: Dominus Fortitudo Nostra
- Motto in English: "The Lord is our Strength"
- Type: Private, non-sectarian, coeducational
- Established: March 24, 2009
- Affiliations: NOPSSCEA, PACUCOA
- Chairman: Annette Zayco-Villaluz
- President: Juan Antonio Z. Villaluz, RN, PHD
- Location: Kabankalan City, Negros Occidental, Philippines; 9°59′1.86″N 122°49′13.75″E
- School Hymn: Light At The South
- Colors: Purple and gold
- Website: www.southlandcollege.edu.ph
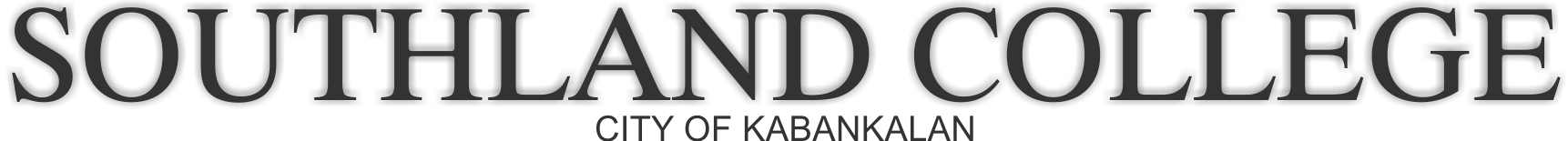

- Location in the Visayas Location in the Philippines

Southland College (SC), officially the Southland College of Kabankalan City, Inc., is a private, non-sectarian coeducational institution located in the second most progressive city in the province of Negros Occidental, Philippines, Kabankalan City. Established in March 2009, it is one of the newest educational institutions in Negros Occidental.

Southland College offerings include levels from pre-school, grade school, junior high school and senior high school all the way up to the college level.

== See also ==
- List of universities and colleges in the Philippines
