= Henry Armitt Brown =

American lawyer

Henry Armitt Brown (December 1, 1844 – August 21, 1878) was an American writer and orator.

== Life ==
Brown was born in Philadelphia, December 1, 1844, the second son of Frederick and Charlotte A. (Hoppin) Brown. Brown is a lineal descendant of William Clayton, the acting Governor of the Pennsylvania Colony. He was also a lineal descendant of Quaker merchant Elijah Brown, one of the seventeen pacifist Quakers of Philadelphia who were arrested without any criminal charges and on September 11, 1777, were forcibly exiled by the Continental Congress and the State of Pennsylvania as suspected Tories just before the occupation of the city by the British Army under General Sir William Howe. They were confined at Winchester, Virginia, where POWs were imprisoned, for over seven months before the Quakers were discharged (without, however, the exoneration they desired) in April 1778.

Henry Armitt Brown graduated from Yale College in 1865. He spent a year after graduating at the Columbia College Law School, New York City. After travels abroad, he resumed the study of the law in the office of Daniel Dougherty, Esq., of Philadelphia, and was admitted to the bar of that city in December, 1869 (Daugherty became a famous political orator). He was attracted to literature, and in spite of success in his profession, he made little effort to increase his practice. He wrote extensively for current periodicals, and began to be widely known as a public speaker. An oration delivered in Philadelphia on the 100th anniversary of the assembling of the Continental Congress of 1774 was followed by a succession of public addresses, especially in connection with the centennial celebrations of revolutionary events. It was after a long day at Valley Forge, on June 19, 1878, where he had delivered an oration, that he returned to Philadelphia to complete his preparation for a similar engagement at Monmouth. His illness gradually developed into typhoid fever. About the first of August he rallied, and seemed likely to recover; but successive relapses ensued, and he died on the 21st of that month at the age of 34.

He was married, Dec. 7, 1871, to Miss Josephine L., daughter of Mr. John Baker, of Philadelphia, who survived him with his only child, a daughter Anna Robeson Brown. Another daughter, Henrietta Armitt Brown, was born posthumously, a week after Brown's death.

He was elected as a member to the American Philosophical Society in 1877. Poignant words from his last oration are found engraved on the National Memorial Arch at Valley Forge National Park.

A public elementary school in Philadelphia is named after him.
