= Eureka Springs and North Arkansas Railway =

Passenger tourist railway in Arkansas, US

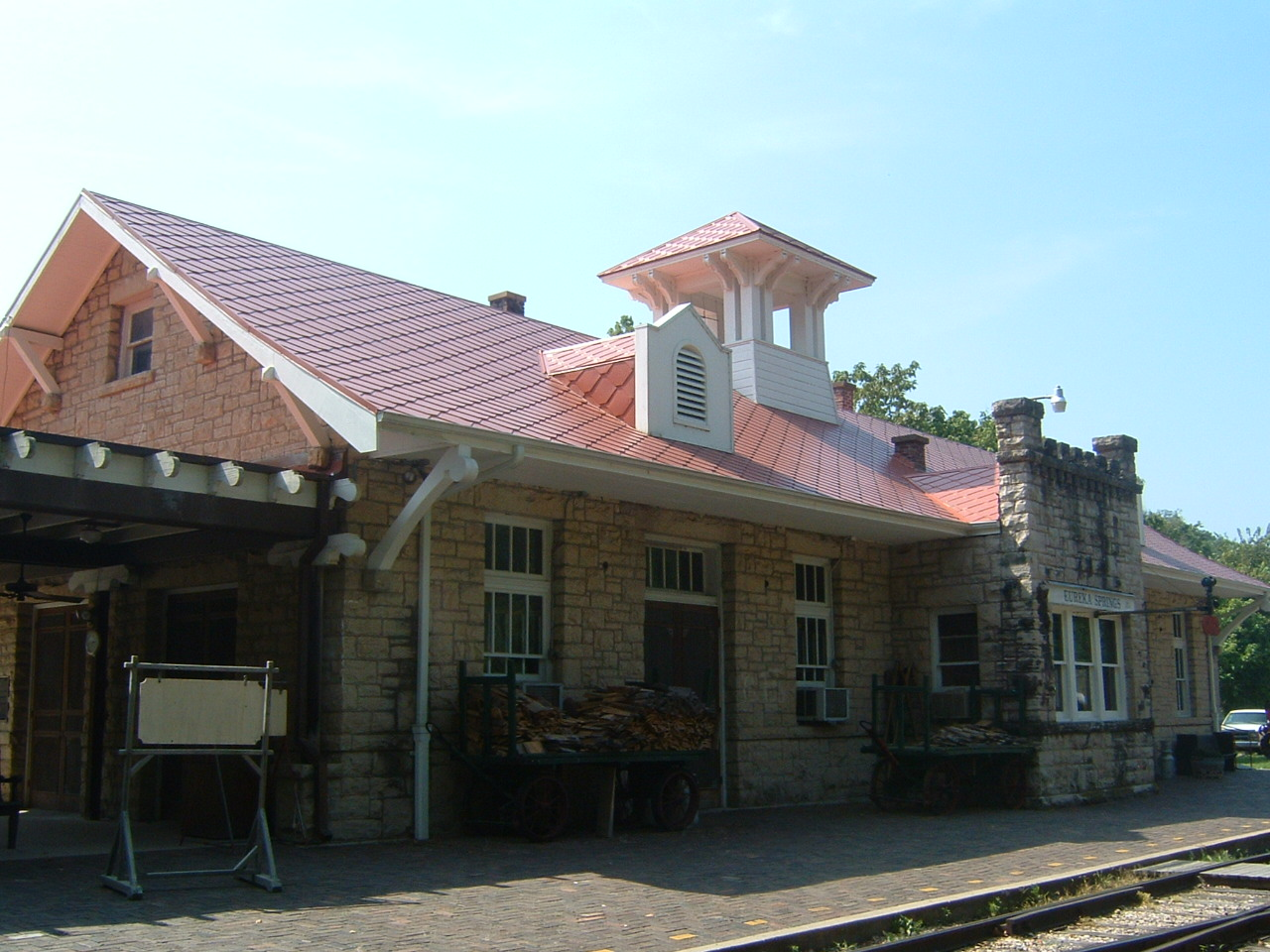
- Depot of the Eureka Springs & North Arkansas Railway, originally built in 1912-13.
- Locale: Carroll County, Arkansas
- Terminus: Eureka Springs
- Coordinates: 36.413573°N 93.733871°W

Commercial operations
- Name: Eureka Springs Railway

Preserved operations
- Owned by: Eureka Springs and North Arkansas Railway Company
- Stations: 1
- Length: 2.5 miles (4.0 km)

Commercial history
- Opened: 1882
- 1899: Becomes St. Louis and North Arkansas Railroad
- 1906: Becomes Missouri and North Arkansas Railroad
- 1913: Current depot built.
- 1922: Becomes Missouri and North Arkansas Railway
- 1935: Becomes Missouri and Arkansas Railway
- 1949: Becomes Arkansas and Ozarks Railway
- Closed: 1961

Preservation history
- 1978: Preservation begins.
- 1982: Filming of The Blue and the Gray.
- 2007: Demolition of engine shed.
- Headquarters: Eureka Springs

Website
- http://www.esnarailway.com/

The Eureka Springs & North Arkansas Railway is a for-profit passenger tourist railway established by the late Robert Dortch, Jr. and his wife Mary Jane in 1981 in Eureka Springs, Arkansas. The railway offers one-hour excursion tours, a catered luncheon train and a catered dinner train - each lasting a little more than one hour, from April through October. It operates along 2.5 miles (4.0 km) of restored track right-of-way formerly belonging to the defunct Arkansas & Ozarks Railway Co - the last incarnation of the North Arkansas Line.

== History ==
The original railway chartered at the site in 1882 was the Eureka Springs Railway, extending from Seligman, Missouri, to Eureka Springs. In 1899, it became the St. Louis & North Arkansas Railroad Co.; in 1906, the Missouri & North Arkansas Railroad Co.; in 1922, the Missouri & North Arkansas Railway Co.; in 1935, the Missouri & Arkansas Railway Co.; in 1949, the Arkansas & Ozarks - which closed in 1961. In 2011, the ES&NA became the road name attached to this trackage for the longest period of time in its existence. At the height of the North Arkansas Line's career, it extended 360 miles (580 km) from Joplin, Missouri to Helena, Arkansas.

Robert Dortch, Jr. had established the Scott and Bearskin Lake Railroad as part of the Plantation Agriculture Museum near Scott, Arkansas, in the 1960s and after his death in 1978, his son closed it and began moving steam locomotives, rolling stock and trackage to the Victorian tourist destination Eureka Springs. He and his wife, Mary Jane, and sons David, John, and Robert set about restoring the historic stone depot, and re-building several trestles over Leatherwood Creek on the pike. A steel water tank was added, as well as a few outbuildings and a commissary adjacent to the old ice house/electric plant building to prepare meals for the luncheon and dinner trains. A 20-hp turntable from the Frisco railroad was installed near the original location of one used by the North Arkansas Line; a wye at "Junction, Arkansas" enables the turning of a locomotive at the far end of the route.

== Locomotives ==
Former:

1. No. 1, a 2-6-0 (Mogul), built 1906, Baldwin Locomotive Works, Philadelphia, PA; Serial No. 29588; wood-burner; 75,000 lb (34,000 kg); 200 psi (1,400 kPa); 12,000 lb (5,400 kg) tractive effort. Retired in the late 1990s because of the expense of burning 1½ to 2 cords of wood each workday. An expensive boiler re-build was also mandated by the state boiler inspector. In early 2011, the loco was moved to the Reader Railroad in Reader, Arkansas for evaluation and possible repair.
2. No. 8, a two-truck Shay engine (Serial No. 2977) built by the Lima Locomotive Works in 1918. It now resides as a static display at the Railway Historical Society of Northern New York, Croghan, NY, awaiting a boiler re-build.
3. No. 201, a 2-6-0 (Mogul), built 1906, American Locomotive Company, Paterson, NJ; coal-burner converted to oil; 185 psi (1,280 kPa); 21,000 lb (9,500 kg) tractive effort. It is one of three known surviving locomotives that worked on the Panama Canal; originally built to 5-foot gauge. Retired early in the 21st century because a boiler re-build was mandated by the state boiler inspector. No. 201 has been donated to the city of Anna, Texas and has been cosmetically restored. It was moved to Sherley Heritage Park late December 2022.

Current:

1. No. 226, a 2-8-2 (Mikado), built 1927, Baldwin Locomotive Works, Philadelphia, PA; coal-burner converted to oil; 180 psi (1,200 kPa) (superheated); 200,000 lb (91,000 kg) with tender. Has always been a "display" engine at the ES&NA, and was never restored to operating condition.
2. No. 4742, an EMD SW1 first-generation diesel-electric switcher, built 1942, Electro-Motive Division of General Motors, LaGrange, IL; Serial No. 1379; diesel; 34,000 lb (15,000 kg) tractive effort. For many years it was the only remaining functional locomotive on-site; now handles both passenger excursion and luncheon/dinner trains.
3. (un-numbered), an 0-4-0 narrow-gauge (24-inch) switcher, built 1935, Buescher & Sons, Berlin, Germany; coal-burner converted to oil. Used atop a sometimes-rotating sign to advertise the railway.
4. No. 700, Oscar, a GE 25-ton switcher, built 1950, Construction No. 30977; 15,000 lb (6,800 kg) tractive effort. Originally powered by a 150 hp Cummins engine; upgraded to a 260 hp engine in 2006. Ballasted to weigh 30 tons. Served at the Holcim Cement Co., New Orleans, LA and others. Delivered to the railway, 12/28/18.

== Rolling stock ==
Six arch-roofed former Rock Island P-70 passenger coaches are used on-site. They are 80 feet (24 m) long and weigh 92,000 pounds (42,000 kg), originally designed to seat 100 people. Two are static displays (a light-gray one - No. 2515 - used as a snack bar; a Tuscan red one -No. 2523 - used as an office). Two Kelly-green coaches - No.1, The Eurekan; and No. 2 - are dining cars. Two are excursion coaches; one maroon - No. 2560 - and the other Kelly-green - No. 2585 (formerly cream with dark red trim). Another 80 ft Tuscan red clerestory-roofed combine is used for storage.

Three cabooses, one wooden, are displayed. There are two tank cars, a pair of flat cars, a coal hopper, a cage car suitable for transporting and displaying circus or zoo animals, and five box cars - one of which is used as a commissary car on the luncheon/dinner trains.

There are at least three motorized yellow speeder maintenance cars (one still functional) on-site, as well as a 1951 Chevrolet track inspector's car.

== Facilities ==
The working yard - with many switches, lights, outbuildings, a functional electric-powered 75-foot (23 m) turntable and water tower - is punctuated with dozens of static displays: two steam-powered tractors, early gas-powered tractors, compressors, pumps, wheelsets, and assorted railroad paraphernalia - a two-man handcar, "tricycle"-type one-man handcar, bells, signals, and luggage carts. An engine house was planned and never built; a shed built to shelter the restoration of Engine No. 226 was dismantled in 2007.

The owners have long had hopes to extend the line east 3 miles (4.8 km) to the old Missouri & North Arkansas tunnel and/or west 5 miles (8.0 km) to Beaver, Arkansas through the Narrows, a gap in the rocky ridge short of the old railroad river bridge there.

Built in 1913, the depot is a repository for dozens of railroadiana items, including props which helped disguise the two Moguls as 1860s 4-4-0 American engines for the filming of scenes from the 1982 television mini-series The Blue and the Gray.

== Gallery ==
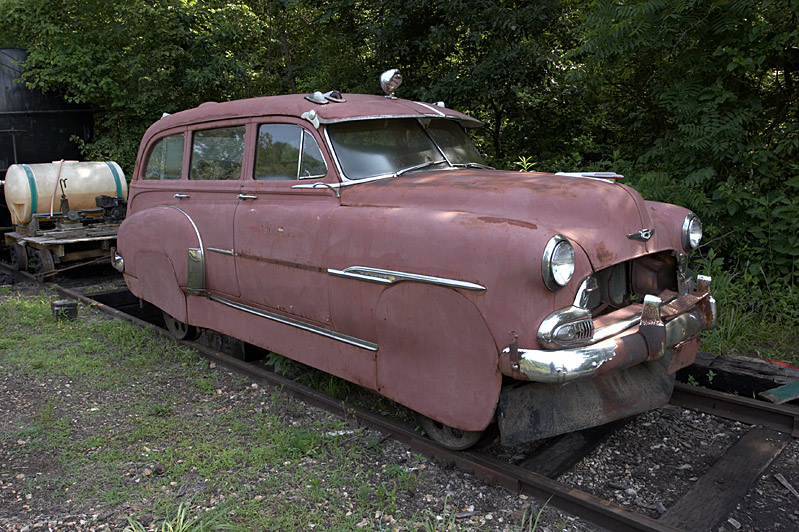
Track Inspection Car, a converted 1951 Chevrolet wagon, is among the exhibits at the Eureka Springs & North Arkansas Railway.

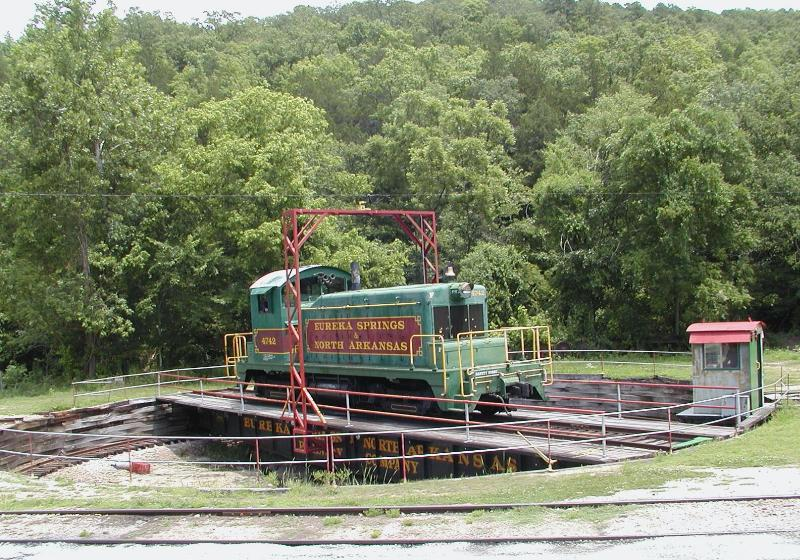
ES&NA Diesel Engine No. 4742 is turned on this former Frisco turntable.

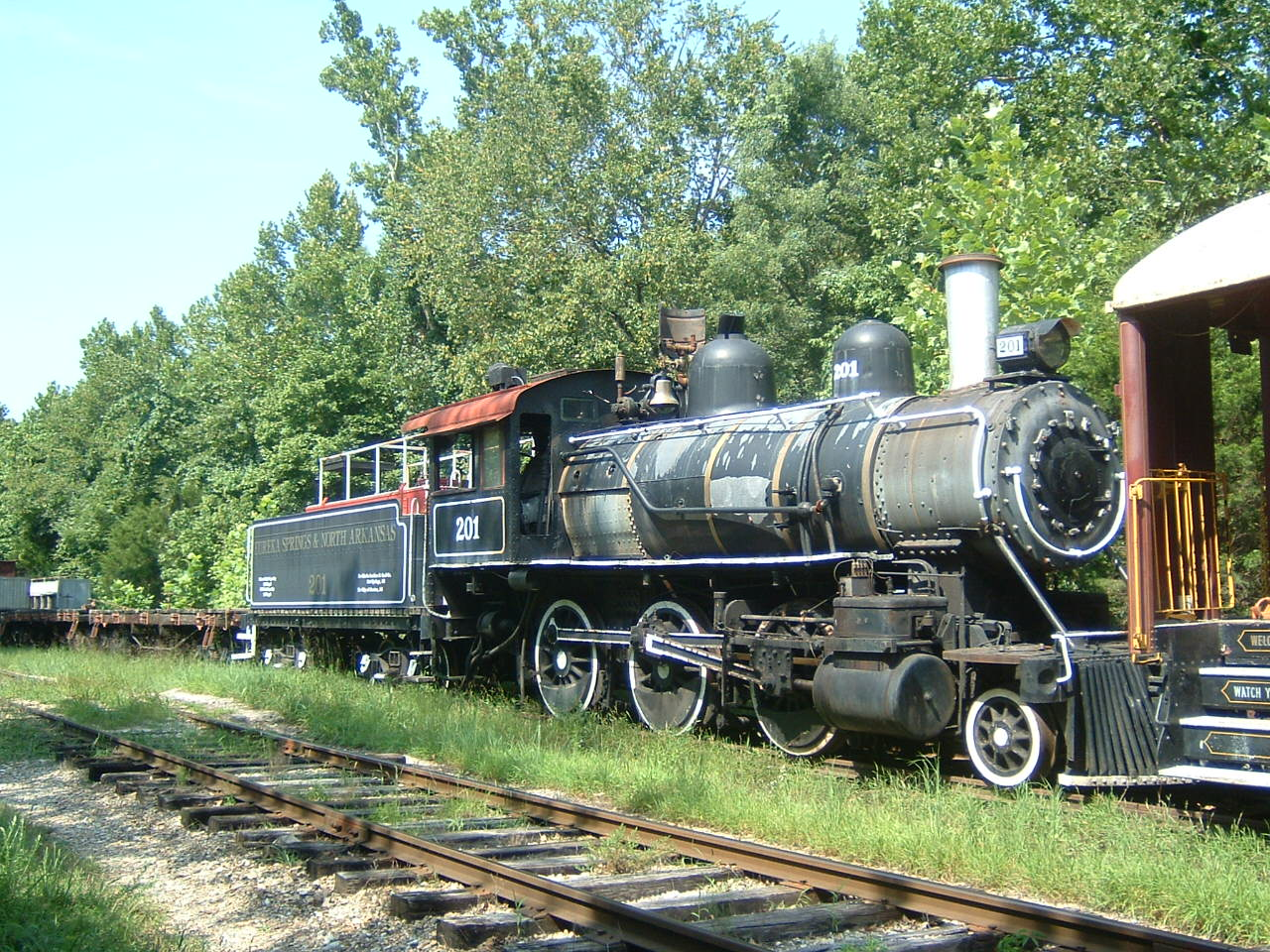
ES&NA No. 201 is displayed on a siding in the railyard; she was formerly the iron workhorse of the excursion trains. Depot of the Eureka Springs & North Arkansas Railway, originally built in 1912–13 to replace a wooden depot built in the 1880s.

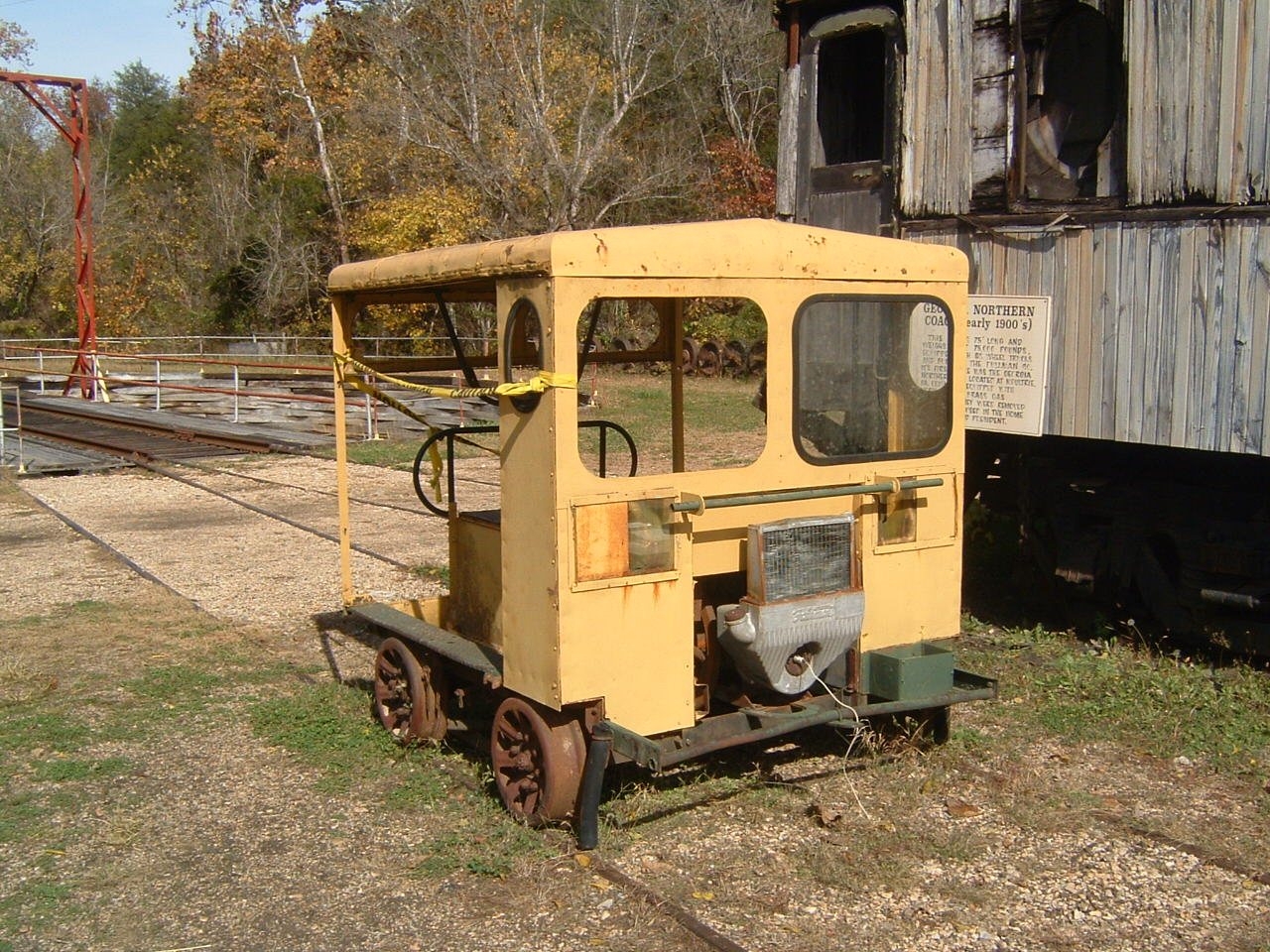
ES&NA Speeder, still operational, assists in the yard.
