= Joseph Brooks (politician) =

American politician

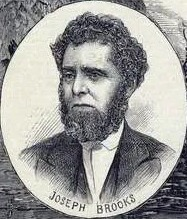

19th Postmaster of Little Rock, Arkansas
- In office March 19, 1875 – April 30, 1877
- Nominated by: Ulysses S. Grant
- Preceded by: James S. Pollock
- Succeeded by: Ozro A. Hadley

Personal details
- Born: November 1, 1812 Cincinnati, Ohio, U.S.
- Died: April 30, 1877 (aged 64) Little Rock, Arkansas, U.S.
- Resting place: Bellefontaine Cemetery, St. Louis, Missouri, U.S. 38°41′29.2″N 90°13′49.4″W
- Party: Republican
- Spouse: Ellen Brooks
- Education: Indiana Asbury University

Military service
- Allegiance: United States
- Branch/service: United States Volunteers
- Years of service: 1862–1865
- Rank: Chaplain
- Unit: 1st Missouri Light Artillery; 11th Missouri Infantry; 33d Missouri Infantry; 56th U.S. Colored Infantry
- Battles/wars: American Civil War

Joseph Brooks (November 1, 1821 – April 30, 1877) was a Methodist minister, newspaper editor, and politician who served as the 19th postmaster of Little Rock, Arkansas, from 1875 to 1877. During the Reconstruction Period in Arkansas (1864–74), Brooks and the "Brindletails" faction of the state's Republican Party led a coalition group in an attempt to overthrow Republican governor Elisha Baxter. The Spring 1874 coup d'état attempt came to be known as the Brooks–Baxter War.

Brooks was wounded during the assassination of James M. Hinds, a former Democrat who supported Reconstruction, by a member of the Ku Klux Klan.

== Early life and military service ==
Joseph Brooks was born in Cincinnati, Ohio, and worked as a minister, preacher, and Methodist church official in Illinois and Missouri from 1840 to 1862. He also worked as a newspaper editor for the Central Christian Advocate in St. Louis. In 1862, he joined the United States Volunteers as a chaplain. In 1863 Brooks, an ardent abolitionist since the 1850s, became chaplain of the 56th United States Colored Infantry. Brooks resigned from the U.S. Volunteers on February 1, 1865.

== Reconstruction era ==
Brooks leased a cotton plantation near Helena, Arkansas, after the American Civil War. He helped organize freedmen and tried to recruit them to the Republican Party. He was a delegate to the Arkansas Constitutional Convention of 1868. During Reconstruction, Joseph Brooks was the leader of the "Brindle Tails" faction of the state's Republican Party. The faction was nicknamed "Brindle Tails", because it was said that when Brooks spoke he sounded like a Brindle-Tailed Bull. In the 1872 gubernatorial campaign, both Brooks and Baxter ran as Republicans.

In 1874, continued disputes about the validity of the 1872 election prompted the Brooks–Baxter War. Brooks put together a militia of more than six hundred men and took control of the state house in Little Rock. He declared himself governor. Baxter gathered about two thousand to fight the supporters of Brooks. Federal troops were stationed between the two forces, After an armed conflict and intervention from U.S. president Ulysses S. Grant, Brooks was removed from office. That same year, however, Grant appointed him as the postmaster of Little Rock, Arkansas, a patronage position.

Political offices
Preceded by James S. Pollock	Postmaster of Little Rock, Arkansas; 1875 – 1877	Succeeded by Ozro A. Hadley
