= Clayton family =

The Clayton family is an old Quaker family that came to America with William Penn in 1682 and has been prominent politically, particularly in Pennsylvania and Delaware.

In 1682 William Penn sailed for America with a large fleet of ships carrying immigrants. Perhaps most of these people were Quakers, but many were not. William Penn himself landed at New Castle, but at least one of his fleet made its way into Chesapeake Bay: the Submission, out of Liverpool and Bristol. The Submission arrived at Choptank, on the Choptank River in Dorchester County on the Eastern Shore of Maryland in November 1682. The "ship's log" lists her passengers, among them James and Jane Clayton and their six children. They were from Middlewich, in the Cheshire County, England.

Many or most of the passengers of the Submission disembarked at Choptank and traveled overland to Bucks County, Pennsylvania, on the west side of the Delaware River a few miles above Philadelphia. It may be assumed that James Clayton and his family were in this number. Neither is it difficult to imagine that some of the party found desirable home sites along the way. Each of the three Clayton sons of James Clayton, as he reached his majority, appeared in the records of Kent County, Delaware.

The listing below is not a genealogy of the family, and is missing many branches of a very large posterity. It is rather intended to an index, providing a guide for the relationships among the many members who are notable and are mentioned in other articles. Presently it is focused on the family in the state of Delaware. As with many family histories, attempts have been made to trace the lineage in the past based on incomplete or inaccurate information, and so therefore, older sources may have information inconsistent with later research.

== Family members ==
James Clayton (1632–1684), m. Jane, to America with Penn’s fleet, 1682

- James (1666–1697), m. Mary Bedwell Webb, res. Kent County, DE
  - John (c1692- 1759)
    - John Clayton
      - John Edmund Clayton
    - James Clayton (c1720- ), m. Grace, miller near Wyoming, Delaware
      - Dr. Joshua Clayton (1744–1798), m. Rachel McCleary
        - James Lawson Clayton 1769-1833), m. Elizabeth Polk
        - Richard Clayton (1774–1836), m. Mary Richardson, Sarah Lawrenson & Araminta Lewis
        - Thomas Clayton (1777–1854), m. Jennette Macomb
      - John Clayton (1749–1802), Judge, m. Mary Manson Manlove
        - James Clayton, m. Sarah Medford
        - Edward Clayton, m. Rachel H. Manlove
      - Thomas Clayton, m. Elizabeth Wharton
        - Charles Clayton
        - John Clayton
      - Lydia Clayton, m. Joseph Hanson
        - James Hanson
      - Grace Clayton
      - Miriam Clayton
      - Amelia Clayton
      - James (George) Clayton (1761–1820), m. Sarah Middleton
        - Lydia Clayton, m. John Kellum
        - John M. Clayton (1796–1856), m. Sallie Ann Fisher
          - James Clayton (1823–1851)
          - Charles McClyment Clayton (1825–1849)
        - Harriet M. Clayton, m. Walter Douglass & Harry W. Peterson
          - John Clayton Douglass (1817–1875), m. Ellen
            - Clayton Douglass (died at 18)
            - Constance Margaret Douglass (1852–1926), m. Francis Nixon Buck (1842–1926)
              - Clayton Douglass Buck (1890–1965), m. Alice du Pont (Wilson) (1891–1967)
                - Clayton Douglass Buck Jnr. ( -1986), m. Mary Biddle Sinclair ( -2009)
        - Elizabeth Clayton, unmarried
        - Mary Anne Clayton, m. George T. Fisher
          - James Clayton Fisher
          - John Clayton Fisher
        - James H. M. Clayton, unmarried
  - James (1695–1761) to North Carolina 1738
- Sarah (1668- )
- John (1671-c1718 ), m. Mary Smith & Mary Wilson
  - Mary (1)
  - Joshua (1)
  - Susanna, m. Abraham Vanhoy
  - Hannah, m. John Levick, & Henry Stevens
  - Elizabeth, m. Mark Manlove, Jr)
  - Daniel
  - Jonathan
  - John
- Mary (1674- )
- Joshua (1677-c1760), m. Mary & Sarah
  - Sarah, m. Thomas Cowgills
  - Lydia, m. John Cowgills
  - Lewis
  - Jordan
- Lydia (c1677- )

- John Clayton
- Joe Clayton
- Francesca Clayton
