= Upland Court =

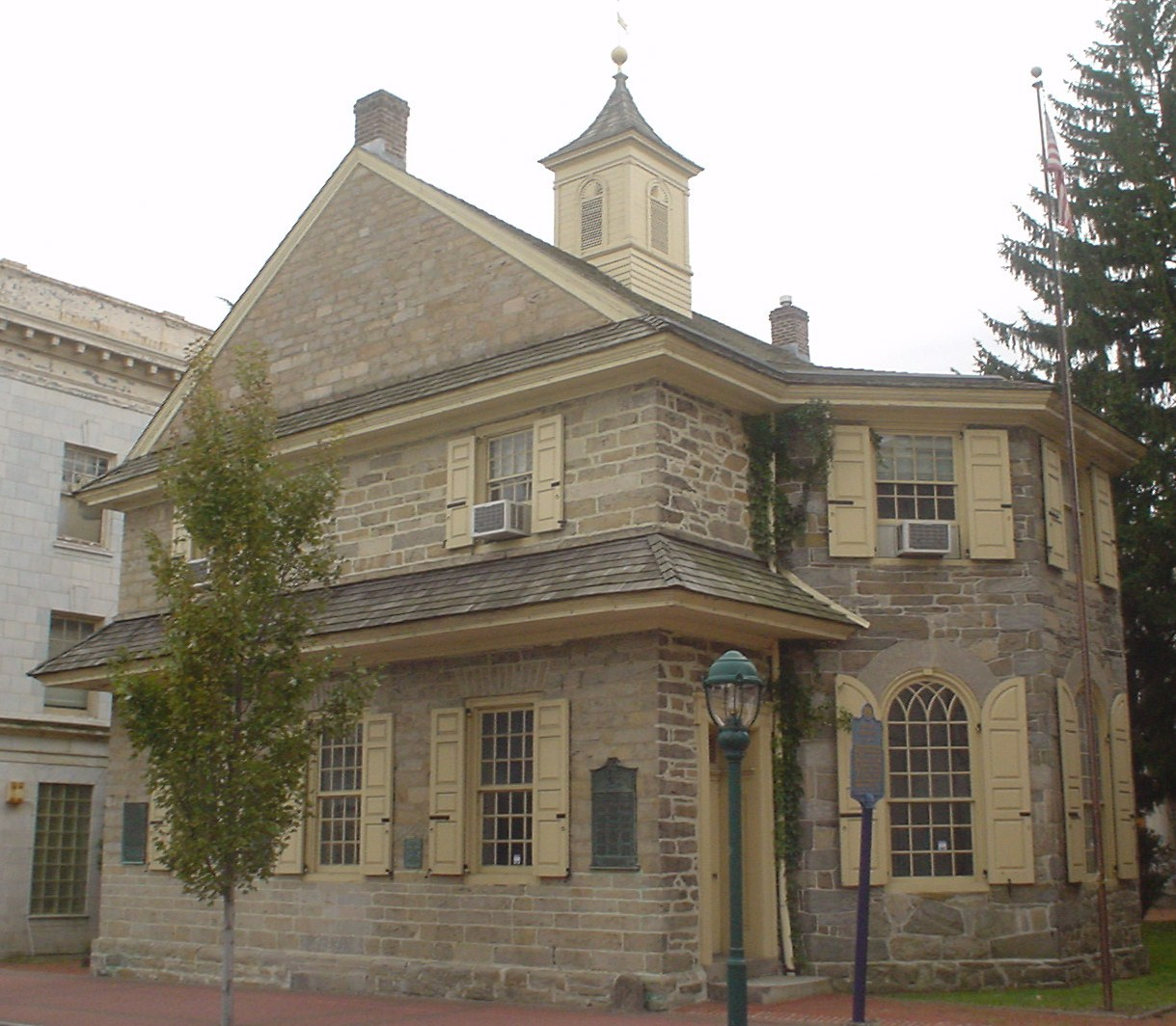
Chester Court House

Upland Court was the governing body of the New Sweden colony following Dutch West India Company annexation from Swedish colonial rule. In 1655, Peter Stuyvesant, governor of the Dutch colony, allowed the colonists to remain an independent Swedish nation through Upland Court, allowing freedom of religion, organization of their own militia, while maintaining their land and trading rights. The court typically met at Upland, now known as Chester, Pennsylvania. This location should not be confused with the current borough of Upland, which adjoins Chester. The Upland Court dealt with legal matters on both sides of the Delaware River.

In November 1674, under the terms of the Treaty of Westminster, Dutch interests ceded New Netherland to the English. The operation of the Upland Court was continued following the establishment of English rule by order of James Stuart, Duke of York. The Upland Court was dissolved by William Penn in 1681 with the charter of Pennsylvania. It was replaced by Philadelphia, Chester and Bucks County courts.

== Other sources ==
- Historical Society of Pennsylvania (1860). The record of the court at Upland: in Pennsylvania. 1676 to 1681. And a military journal, kept by Major E. Denny, 1781 to 1795, Volume 7 of Memoirs, Historical Society of Pennsylvania. Lippincott.
- E. Denny The Record of the Court at Upland in Pennsylvania, 1676 to 1681 (Kessinger Pub Company. 2007) ISBN 0548292493
