= Marie Odee Johnson =

Marie Odee Johnson (July 23, 1897 – September 25, 2004) was an American who was one of the last surviving female veterans from the First World War. As a Yeoman (F), Johnson was among the first group of women to serve in the United States Navy in a non-nursing capacity.

== Biography ==
Marie Odee Johnson was born in Quincy, Illinois, but her family moved to Dallas, Texas, when she was an infant. She was serving as a secretary with the Federal Bureau of Investigation (FBI) in Dallas when the United States entered World War I. Two of her brothers joined the Armed Forces and her sister was a Red Cross Nurse. The Navy recruiting office was near her office and the men who worked there convinced her that she would have a better job in the Navy. Johnson joined up at age 20. She didn't tell her "single parent father" that she joined at first. However, when she told her father that "he'd have to put a fourth star in the window" he congratulated her.

Johnson was one of 12,000 women (other than nurses) who worked for the Navy "handling clerical duties in the United States to free men for fighting." Johnson was stationed in New York City and Washington, D. C. during the war. She recalls that there were no facilities or barracks for women in the Navy at the time and so she and the other Yeomen were given $90 a month for room and board on top of their $30 a month salary.

She returned to her job with the FBI in Dallas afterwards. In 1926, she married Edward C. Johnson, a World War I veteran of the Army, and they had one daughter, Marilyn, together. Edward Johnson died in 1948. In 1997, she was interviewed for Life Magazine.

Johnson moved into the Transitional Care Unit in the Dallas Veterans Affairs Medical Center in 1998. She was "the acknowledged 'queen bee' of the veterans' facility. Johnson died in her sleep in at the age of 107. She was the last female World War I Veterans in North Texas when she died.

== See also ==
- Alice Baker
- Gladys Powers
- Alice Strike
- Charlotte Winters
