= Charlotte Winters =

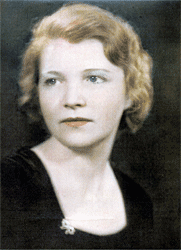
Portrait of Charlotte Winters

Charlotte Louise Berry Winters (November 10, 1897 – March 27, 2007) was, at age 109, the last surviving female American veteran of The First World War.

== Biography ==
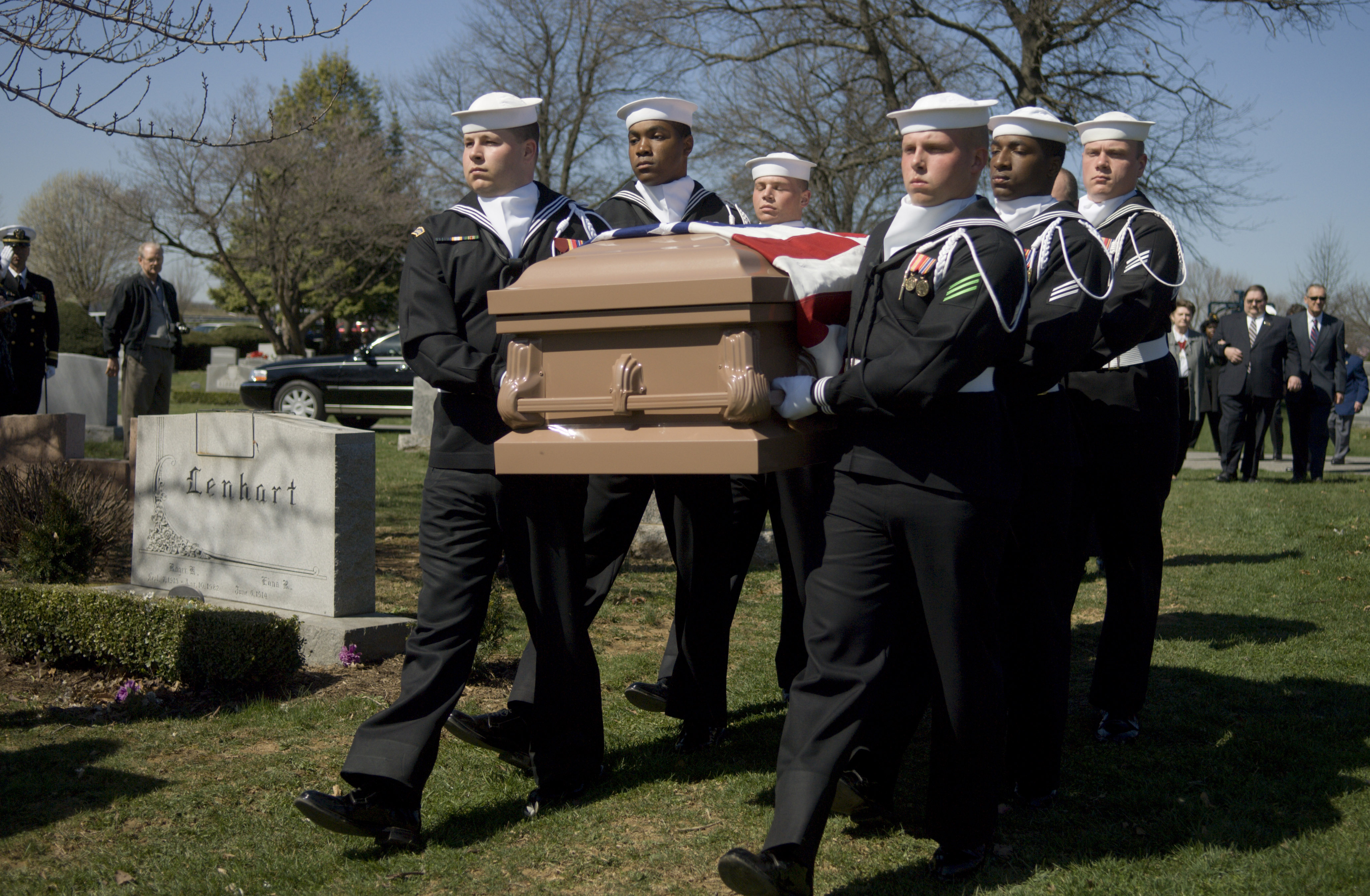
A United States Navy honor guard bears the casket of Charlotte Winters, March 30, 2007

She was born Charlotte Louise Berry in Washington, D.C., to Mackell and Louise Bild Berry. When the Navy opened support roles to women, Charlotte and her sister, Sophie, joined in 1917. She served from 1917 to 1919 at the Naval Gun Factory in the Washington Navy Yard as a clerk. By December 1918, more than 11,000 women had enlisted and were serving in support positions. In 1919, most of the Yeoman (F) were released from the service. At that time she had attained the rank of Yeoman (F) Second Class in the U.S. Naval Reserve. Winters was able to return to the same position as a civil servant. Winters served as a secretary, and retired in 1953.

Winters helped to found the National Yeoman (F) Association in 1926 and served as its eighth commander in 1940 and 1941. She was active in the American Legion for 88 years.

She died, aged 109, in a nursing home in Boonsboro, Maryland, and was buried with full military honors at Mount Olivet Cemetery in Frederick, Maryland. At the time of her death, she was the oldest living World War I veteran in the US, leaving only three living World War I female veterans left in the world, then-108-year-old Gladys Powers, 107-year-old Ivy Campany and 106-year-old Florence Green, who served for the United Kingdom.

== See also ==
- Women In Military Service For America Memorial
- Marie Odee Johnson
- Loretta Perfectus Walsh
