= Mary Johnson =

Mary Johnson may refer to:

== Writers ==
- Mary F. Johnson (1779–1863), English Romantic poet
- Mary Theresa Vidal (born Johnson, 1815–1873), English novelist
- Mary Coffin Johnson (1834–1928), American activist and writer
- Mary Johnson (writer) (born 1958), American writer and director

== Others ==
- Mary Johnson (first lady) (c. 1830–1887), first lady of California
- Mary Johnson Stover (1832–1883), née Mary Johnson, daughter of U.S. president Andrew Johnson
- Mary J. Johnson Woodlen (1870–1933), American influential suffragist
- Mary C. Johnson (c. 1880–?), one of the first three women to practice law in Georgia
- Mary Johnson (actress) (1896–1975), Swedish silent film performer
- Mary Johnson (singer) (1898–1983), African American blues singer
- Mary Johnson Lowe (1924–1999), née Mary Johnson, American jurist
- Mary Johnson (cricketer) (born 1924), English cricketer
- Mary Lea Johnson (1926–1990), American theatrical producer, entrepreneur and philanthropist
- Mary Johnson, American advocate for disability rights; founded Ragged Edge magazine
- Mary Johnson (politician) (active since 2014), member of the North Dakota House of Representatives
- Mary Elizabeth Wieting Johnson (1843–1927), American opera house manager and philanthropist
- Mary Johnson Bailey Lincoln (1844–1921), née Johnson, Boston cooking teacher and cookbook author

== See also ==
- Nathan and Mary (Polly) Johnson properties, American National Historic Landmark in New Bedford, Massachusetts
- Mary Johnston (disambiguation)
- Marie Johnson (disambiguation)
- Johnson (surname)
