= Marie Johnson =

Marie Johnson may refer to:

- Marie Odee Johnson (1897–2004), American who was one of the last surviving women veterans from the First World War
- Marie Johnson (suffragist) (1874–1974), Irish trade unionist, suffragist and teacher
- Marie Johnson-Calloway (1920–2018), American artist

== See also ==
- Mary Johnson (disambiguation)
