= Bernice Tongate =

American Yeomanette (1897–1990)

- Tongate was one of the models for a 1917 poster illustrated by Howard Chandler Christy
- Born: Bernice Duncan Smith; 14 December 1897; Pueblo, Colorado, US
- Died: 16 January 1990 (aged 92)
- Allegiance: United States
- Branch: US Navy; US Army
- Service years: 1917–1920 (Navy)
- Rank: Chief petty officer

Bernice Tongate (née Smith) (14 December 1897 – January 16, 1990) was an American yeomanette who served in the United States Navy during World War I. The first time Tongate tried to enlist, she was rejected, prompting her to say that she wished she was a man. Howard Chandler Christy, a portrait painter, overheard this interaction and asked her to pose for a poster in a sailor's uniform. She was then allowed to enlist as a yeoman ten days later, becoming the first Californian woman to do so.

== Early life ==
Bernice Smith was born on December 14, 1897, in Pueblo, Colorado. She had an older sister named Lucile and a younger sister named Damaris. Their father died of pleurisy in 1915.

== Career ==
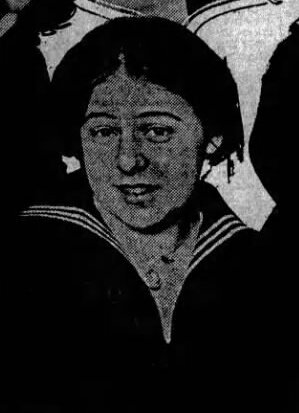
Bernice Tongate (then Smith) in 1917

In 1917, at the beginning of the United States' involvement in World War I, Tongate, aged twenty, was employed as an office worker in Los Angeles. Hearing of the war and that the Navy had opened up recruitment to women, and as her family "had no sons to send", she made up her mind to enlist. Upon arriving at the recruiting office, she was told by an officer that they did not accept women. Tongate questioned him, declaring that the newspapers said Washington was accepting women and further saying:

Sir, if I were a man, I would join the Navy. This is the first time in history that my family hasn't been represented in an American war, and you've just got to take me.

While at the office, she was spotted by illustrator Howard Chandler Christy. On Christy's suggestion, Tongate was lent a white hat, middy blouse, and neckerchief; he sketched her; that sketch later formed the part of the basis of a recruiting poster that became symbolic of the war effort. Blazoned with the words "Gee!! I wish I were a man. I'd join the Navy", the poster depicts a woman wearing a sailor outfit. Though the model's exact identity is unknown, according to US Navy records, the woman on the poster is a composite of three women: Smith, E. Leroy Finch, and Christy's wife, but, in the words of a Navy Recruiting Command spokesperson, "[u]ndoubtedly, Mrs. Tongate is probably a primary model for that poster". It was common for wartime propaganda during this era to encourage men to enlist through featuring "alluring and romanticized images of women". The poster is widely considered to be one of the most well-known recruiting posters of the era; M. Margaret McKeown described Tongate as "perhaps the most famous WWI poster girl".

Tongate was allowed to enlist as a Yeoman ten days later alongside Amy F. M. Norberg and Merlee Adams. Their applications were accepted by the government on May 14. The first Californian woman to join, Smith was initially assigned to the recruiting station. After a few weeks she was re-assigned to do clerical work at the Naval Base San Pedro. While on base, the chief petty officer she worked for was resistant to the idea of women in the Navy and attempted to force her out by making her, and only her, work all night at the base on Thanksgiving. Smith did as she was instructed, but was interrupted by the captain of the base. He gave her the rest of the day off and sent her home in his car; the next day he scolded the chief petty officer, who apologized to Smith. She made him cookies in return.

Tongate was discharged in February 1920, having acquired the rank of chief petty officer. She attempted to re-enlist in the Navy in World War II, and the Marines, but was turned down by both organizations on account of her age. She was accepted by the Army. She was assigned to work as a postal clerk on bases in California and Michigan, but also worked alongside nurses in the amputee hospital in Battle Creek, Michigan. After the war's end, she worked in veteran's hospitals in California.

== Later life ==
Tongate had two grandsons who served in the Vietnam War. She died at the age of 92 on January 16, 1990.

== See also ==
- United States Navy operations during World War I
- Women in the United States Navy
- Pin-up model
