= Alice Strike =

Last surviving female Canadian World War I veteran

Alice Mary Strike (31 August 1896 – 22 December 2004) was the last surviving female Canadian military First World War veteran. She was so designated as she lived in Canada after the war, but had actually served in the British armed forces. Canada did not allow females to serve in the military until the Second World War.

Strike was born in Godalming, Surrey, England. In 1914, she enlisted in the RFC as a pay clerk. She married her first husband, a Canadian man named James Stobie Sr., whom she met in Woking, England, during World War I, and later relocated to Winnipeg, Manitoba, where she had four children with him over forty years.

After Stobie retired, they moved to Vancouver, British Columbia, Canada and, after her husband had died, she met George Strike on Haida Gwaii in British Columbia. At the age of 90, when she was single again, she moved to Nova Scotia, where her daughter Buzza would care for her. She also had a son, James Stobie Jr., of Victoria, British Columbia, four grandchildren, seven great-grandchildren and three great-great-grandchildren at the time of her death.

Strike died, aged 108, at Camp Hill Veterans Hospital, Halifax, Nova Scotia.

She was one among 46,000 people to receive the Jubilee medal in February 2003. Queen Elizabeth had also sent congratulations every year since Strike turned 100.

Strike was a member of the Royal Canadian Legion as well.

== See also ==
- Gladys Powers
