= Joy Bright Hancock =

US Navy officer (1898-1986)

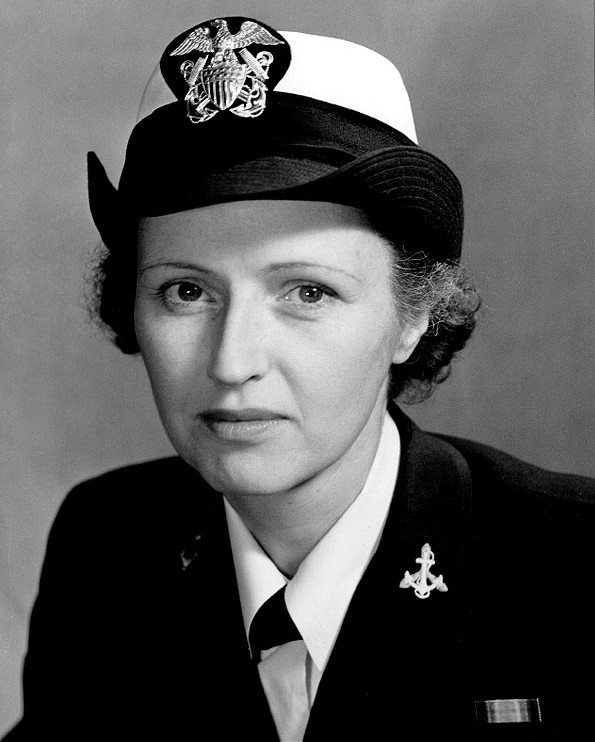
- LCDR Joy Bright Hancock, c.1943
- Born: 4 May 1898; Wildwood, New Jersey
- Died: 20 August 1986 (aged 88); Bethesda, Maryland
- Burial place: Arlington National Cemetery
- Spouse(s): LT Charles G. Little USN (?–1921); LT Lewis Hancock, Jr. USN (1924–1925); VADM Ralph A. Ofstie USN (1954–1956)
- Military career
- Allegiance: United States of America
- Branch: (United States Navy) United States Naval Reserve
- Service years: 1918, 1942–1953
- Rank: Captain
- Unit: WAVES
- Conflicts: World War I World War II

Joy Bright Hancock (4 May 1898 –20 August 1986), a veteran of both the First and Second World Wars, was one of the first women officers of the United States Navy.

== Biography ==
Joy Bright was born in Wildwood, New Jersey on 4 May 1898. During World War I, after attending business school in Philadelphia, Pennsylvania, she enlisted in the Navy as a Yeoman (F), serving at Camden, New Jersey and at Naval Air Station Wildwood.

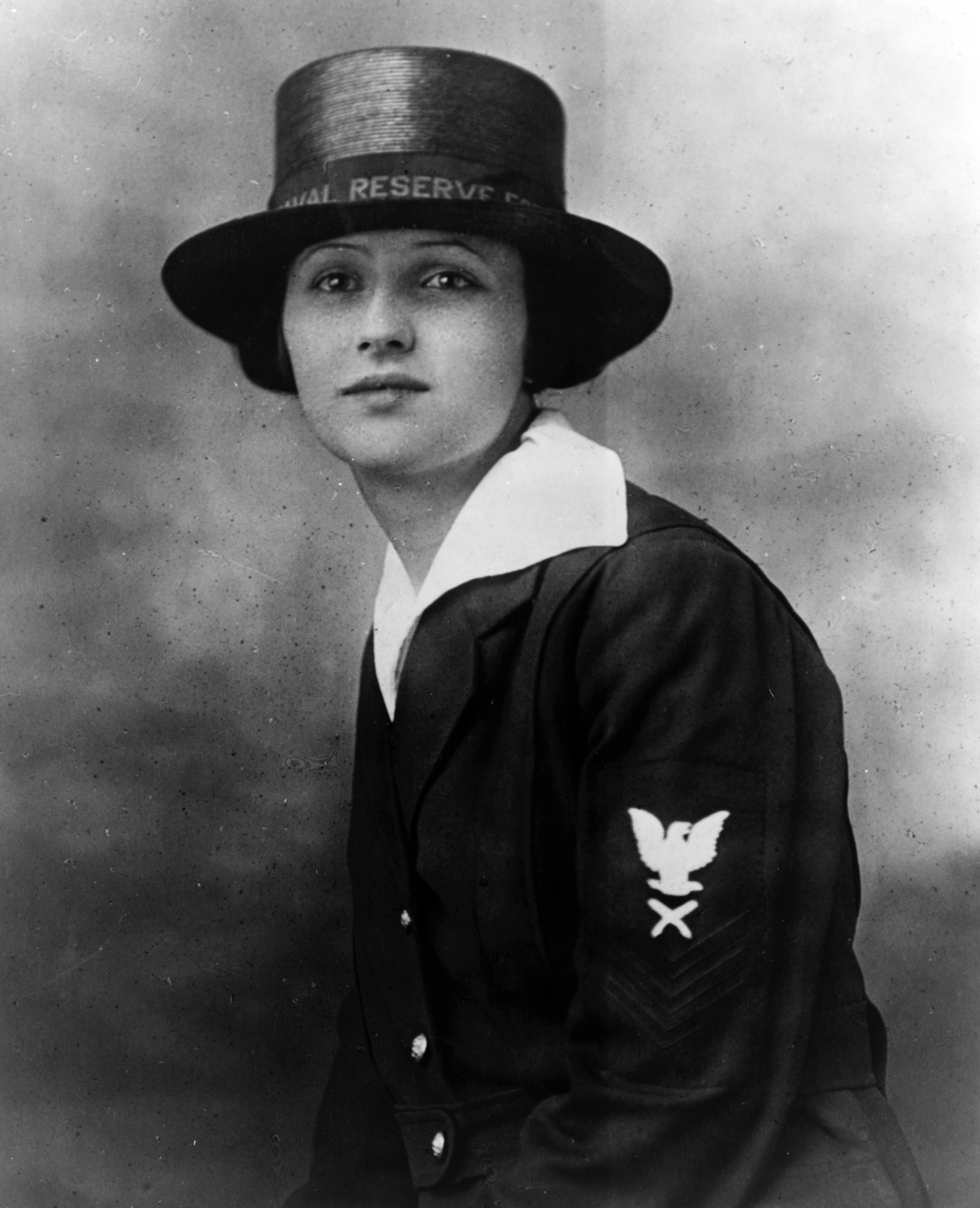
Joy Bright Hancock, February 1918

Following the war, she married Lieutenant Charles Gray Little, who was killed in the crash of the airship ZR-2 in 1921. A year later, she obtained employment with the Bureau of Aeronautics, where her duties including editing the Bureau's News Letter, which later evolved into the magazine Naval Aviation News. In 1924, she left the Bureau to marry Lieutenant Commander Lewis Hancock, Jr., who lost his life when airship USS Shenandoah (ZR-1) crashed in September 1925.

Joy Bright Hancock returned to the Bureau after attending Foreign Service School and obtaining a private pilot's license. For more than a decade before World War II and into the first year of that conflict, she was responsible for the Bureau's public affairs activities.

On 15 October 1942, she was commissioned as a lieutenant in the newly formed Women's Reserve, commonly known as Women Accepted for Volunteer Emergency Service (WAVES). She initially served as WAVES representative in the Bureau of Aeronautics and later in a similar position for the Deputy Chief of Naval Operations (Air). She was promoted to lieutenant commander on 26 November 1943 and to the rank of commander by the end of the War.

At the end of the war, she was awarded a Letter of Commendation, with Ribbon, by the Secretary of the Navy. The commendation reads:

“…Discharging with zeal, leadership and judgment her many responsibilities, Commander Hancock assumed an important role in the development, expansion and administration of the comprehensive program designed to integrate women in the Naval Service and utilize their various skills. Maintain close liaison with the office of the Director of the Women’s Reserve, she aided in formulating policies governing the Women’s Reserve…Her recommendation concerning living standards and working conditions of Naval shore establishments in this country and Hawaii were essential factors in the increased efficiency of Women’s Reserve members in these activities…”

In February 1946, Commander Hancock became the Assistant Director (Plans) of the Women's Reserve and was promoted to WAVES' Director in July of that year. She was promoted to the rank of captain on 15 October 1948. Her promotion to captain after only 6 years of service was one of fastest progressions to that rank in the Navy's history.

She guided the WAVES through the difficult years of Naval contraction in the later 1940s and the expansion of the early 1950s, a period that also saw the Navy's women achieve status as part of the Regular Navy. Captain Hancock retired from active duty in June 1953.

Upon her retirement, she was again recognized for her contributions to the Armed Forces and received the Legion of Merit “For exceptionally meritorious conduct…as Director of the Women’s Reserve of the Naval Reserve from July 1946 to October 1948, and as Assistant Chief of Naval Personnel for Women from October 1948 to June 1953…” The citation continues in part:

“Exercising organizational and administrative ability of the highest caliber, Captain Hancock served with distinction throughout the transition period in which women became a regular component of the United States Navy and was eminently successful in initiating the basic plans and in overcoming the many varied and complex problems which confronted her during the inaugural stages incident to establishing the women as an integral part of the naval service…She was directly instrumental in the formulation of plans and policies affecting the selection and training of the women, together with their utilization, administration, welfare and housing. Skillfully welding the personnel under her leadership into a high efficient unit, she maintained a coordinated and effective command and contributed immeasurably to the success achieved by women in the various fields to which they were assigned throughout the naval service…”

The next year, she married Vice Admiral Ralph A. Ofstie and accompanied him on his 1955–56 tour as Commander, Sixth Fleet. Following her husband's death in late 1956, she lived in the Washington, D.C., area and in the Virgin Islands.

Hancock published her autobiography, Lady in the Navy: A Personal Reminiscence, in 1972.

She died on 20 August 1986, aged 88, in Bethesda, Maryland. She was buried with her husband, Admiral Ofstie, at Arlington National Cemetery.

On 16 December 2024, it was announced that a future Constellation-class frigate, FFG-69, will be named after her.

== Awards ==
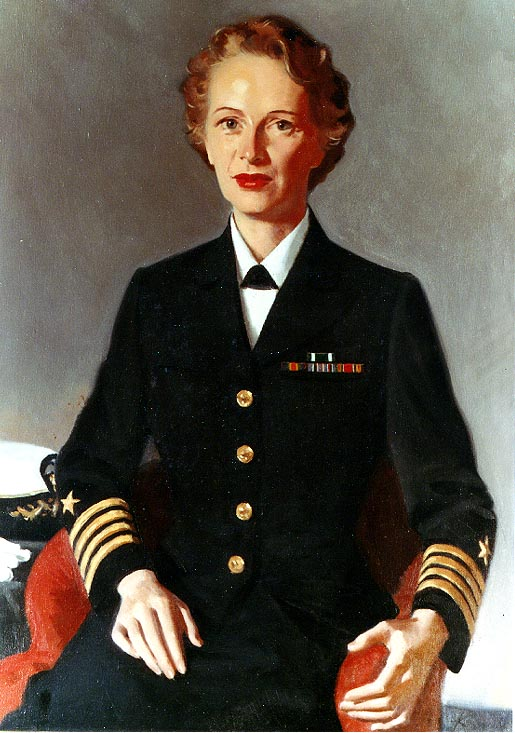
Captain Joy Bright Hancock, USN; portrait by David Komuro, c. 1953.

- Legion of Merit
- Navy Commendation Medal
- World War I Victory Medal
- American Campaign Medal
- World War II Victory Medal
- National Defense Service Medal

== See also ==
- Women in the United States Navy
- WAVES
- Yeoman (F)
