= Daisy May Pratt Erd =

United States Navy sailor

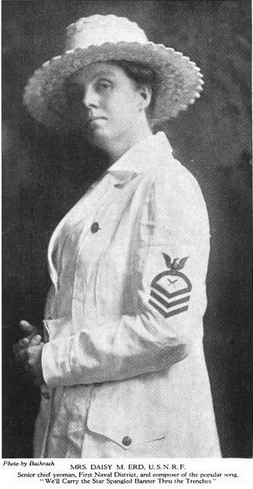
- Daisy Pratt Erd, from a 1918 publication.
- Born: 1882; Canada
- Died: 1925 (aged 42–43)
- Spouse: Louis Erd
- Military career
- Allegiance: United States
- Branch: United States Navy Reserve
- Rank: Yeoman (F)
- Other work: musician

Daisy May Pratt Erd USNR (1882-1925) was a Canadian-born American songwriter and composer, and a naval Yeoman (F) in Boston, Massachusetts during World War I. After the war, she advocated for the recognition of women veterans.

== Early life ==
Daisy May Pratt was born in Canada and raised in Chicago, Illinois, where she taught music.

== Career ==
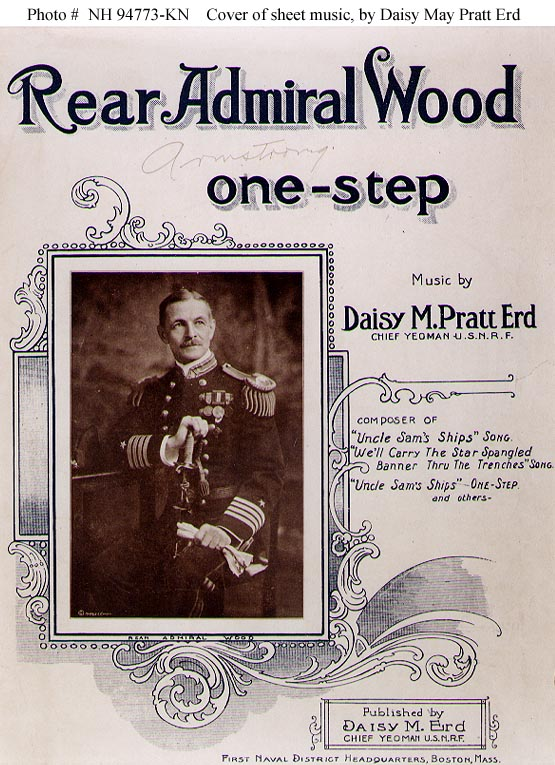
Cover sheet for the "Rear Admiral Wood One-Step," ca. 1918

Erd was a young mother of two and a piano teacher, when she enlisted in the United States Navy Reserve in 1917. Soon she was the chief yeoman in charge of all the enlisted women working in the Boston Navy Yard. She opened a lunch room for the naval yard's employees, and created the Hingham Naval Training Station Band, for the recreation of recruits with musical skills. Compositions by Erd included "We'll Carry The Star Spangled Banner Thru The Trenches", "Uncle Sam's Ships" (a tribute to the USS Melville), "Welcome Home", and "The Rear Admiral Wood One-Step" (written in honor of Spencer S. Wood). She donated thousands of dollars in profits from these songs to the Naval Reserve Fund and the Naval Relief Society. She was awarded a gold medal in 1918 by William R. Rush, commandant of the naval yard, "for merit, war service".

After her active service, she helped to found the first women's post of the American Legion, in Boston, and was elected as commander of the post. She successfully persuaded the American Legion's national executive committee in Washington D. C. to maintain the unique post's charter and Charlestown location, against some local opposition. She advocated for a state bonus of $100 for women in Massachusetts who served in the Navy, and began a union to improve the women veterans' job prospects. "We did a man's job, and why shouldn't we be treated like the men are treated in the matter of bonuses?" she asked. As a show of appreciation, the women of her American Legion post bought her ringside seats to a boxing match in Boston in 1921, assuring a reporter that "she will be tickled foolish when we tell her that she is going to the fight."

== Personal life ==
Daisy May Pratt married Louis Erd, a barber. They had two daughters, Norma and Georgia. Georgia also served in the military, rising to the rank of Major in the Army.

Daisy Pratt Erd died in 1925, from tuberculosis that she contracted during her naval service.
