= Mary Johnston (disambiguation) =

Mary Johnston (1870–1936) was an American novelist and women's rights advocate.

Mary Johnston may also refer to:

- Mary Helen Johnston (born 1945), American NASA scientist and astronaut
- Mary Johnston School of Nursing, see Philippine Christian University

== See also ==
- Mary Johnson (disambiguation)
- Mary Johnstone, pianist
