= We'll Carry The Star Spangled Banner Thru The Trenches =

Song
- Language: English
- Published: 1917
- Songwriter: Daisy May Pratt Erd

We'll Carry The Star Spangled Banner Thru The Trenches is a World War I song written by Daisy May Pratt Erd. The song was first published in 1917 by Lang & Mendelsohn in Boston MA. The sheet music cover depicts soldiers advancing over barbed wire with a flag waving.

The sheet music can be found at the Pritzker Military Museum & Library.
