= Thelma Bendler Stern =

Thelma Bendler Neubauer (née Stern, December 7, 1923 – November 27, 2015) was the first woman assigned to perform duties aboard a United States Navy ship as part of her official responsibilities. Stern was a civilian employee at the Norfolk Naval Shipyard during World War II, working in the engineering department. Her job as a ship's draftsman included taking measurements of ship features as required by her engineer colleagues to allow them to designate the placement of upgrades such as new anti-aircraft guns. Stern’s first assignment aboard ship occurred June 29, 1943, aboard the USNS Escalante, a tanker (hull number AO70). This was followed by assignments aboard a further 229 ships before her career at the Navy yard ended in January 1946.

== Early life ==
Stern was born December 7, 1923, in Norfolk, Virginia, the second of seven children of Milford Josiah Stern, a real estate and life insurance agent, and Thelma Georgia Bendler Stern, who served as a yeomanette during World War I. Prior to the Great Depression, the Stern family enjoyed a prosperous upper-middle-class lifestyle, frequently traveling between their homes in New York and Norfolk. During the Depression, a series of events dominated by the failure of Mr. Stern’s stock market investments resulted in the family’s poverty. In the early 1930s they settled into a home in Norfolk, where Mr. Stern found work to provide for the family. His death by pneumonia in 1934 left Mrs. Stern raising seven children alone, ranging in age from two to thirteen years. Mrs. Stern worked for the Virginia Statistical Bureau and often had to travel to other cities around the state for weeks at a time, leaving Thelma, the eldest daughter, largely in charge of overseeing the younger children and running the household.

With the Japanese attack at Pearl Harbor occurring on the morning of her 18th birthday, an outraged Thelma Stern yearned to do whatever she could to help the US war effort. Still a junior in high school, she signed up for the mechanical drawing class at her high school, a course that had previously been open only to male students.

== World War II career ==
Upon graduating high school, Stern immediately applied for work in the Engineering division at the Norfolk Naval Shipyard. With the available able-bodied young men being called upon to serve in the armed forces, the navy leadership needed to be creative in their approach to meeting the demanding schedules involved in upgrading the fleet with modern weapon and defensive systems. This led to opportunities for non-traditional members of the work force, and many women were ready and willing to answer the call. Stern started work in the naval shipyard’s engineering department on June 7, 1943, assigned to the weights and stability section of the hull department.

Many of her civilian male colleagues were either retired from service in the Navy, or were unfit for military service – disabled in ways that limited their ability to maneuver aboard ships, which required climbing ladders and stepping through narrow passageways. In order to accomplish work at the necessary pace, the chief engineer of the hull department used some of his female employees to obtain the precise measurements from ships as needed to engineer their defense system updates, such as placement of 40mm anti-aircraft guns.

Stern was employed as a civilian. All of her duties aboard ships were performed while the ships were docked or in drydock, and never while underway. At the direction of the chief engineer, she was accompanied by an armed guard whenever performing duties aboard any vessel. The guard was always a member of the crew of the vessel being surveyed, appointed by its captain. Because of superstitions that persisted during the first half of the twentieth century, some ship captains refused to allow a female to board their ship. In those instances, the work schedule was adjusted to swap the ship that Stern had been assigned to with that of a male colleague.

== Post-war life ==
As part of the demobilization program, Stern was released from her employment at the Norfolk Naval Shipyard in January 1946. She moved to Baltimore, Maryland, to accept a position as a draftsman with the Glenn L. Martin Company. There she met a fellow draftsman named Clarence Neubauer. They married in 1947 and raised five children together in Baltimore.

Stern died on November 27, 2015, at the age of 91.
