= USS Lewis Hancock =

Fletcher-class destroyer

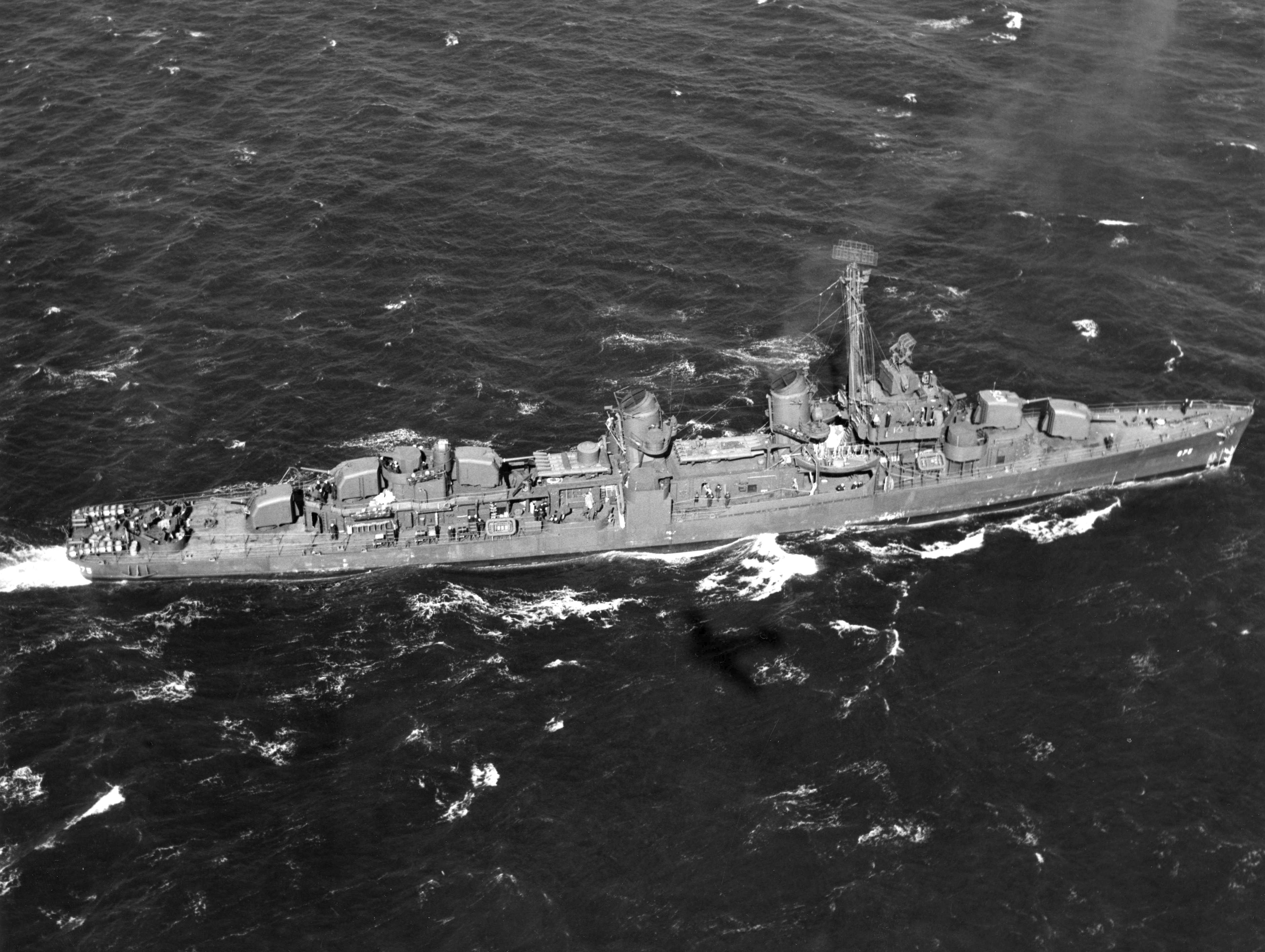

History

United States
- Name: Lewis Hancock
- Namesake: Lewis Hancock, Jr.
- Builder: Federal Shipbuilding & Drydock Co., Kearny, N.J.
- Laid down: 31 March 1943
- Launched: 1 August 1943
- Commissioned: 29 September 1943
- Decommissioned: 18 December 1957
- Stricken: 15 March 1973
- Fate: Transferred to Brazil, 1 August 1967

History

Brazil
- Name: Piaui (D 31)
- Acquired: 1 August 1967
- Commissioned: 1 August 1967
- Stricken: 1989
- Fate: Scrapped, 1989

General characteristics
- Class & type: Fletcher-class destroyer
- Displacement: 2,050 tons
- Length: 376 ft 5 in (114.7 m)
- Beam: 39 ft 7 in (12.1 m)
- Draft: 17 ft 9 in (5.4 m)
- Propulsion: 60,000 shp (45 MW); geared turbines; 2 propellers
- Speed: 35 knots (65 km/h; 40 mph)
- Range: 6,500 nautical miles at 15 kt; (12,000 km at 30 km/h)
- Complement: 329
- Armament: 5 × 5 in (130 mm)/38 guns, 14 × 40 mm AA guns, 12 × 20 mm AA guns, 5 × 21 inch (533 mm) torpedo tubes, 6 × depth charge projectors, 2 × depth charge tracks

USS Lewis Hancock (DD-675) was a Fletcher-class destroyer of the United States Navy, in service from 1943 to 1946 and from 1951 to 1957. She was sold to Brazil in 1967, where she served as Piaui (D31) until being scrapped in 1989.

== Namesake ==
Lewis Hancock Jr. was born on 15 October 1889 in Austin, Texas. He was appointed to the United States Naval Academy from that state in 1906 and graduated in June 1910. He served on the battleship USS Vermont before being commissioned as an ensign in March 1912, then underwent submarine instruction and served in the new submarine USS G-1. Between 1913 and 1915 Ensign Hancock commanded the submarine USS C-2. Promoted to Lieutenant (junior grade) in 1915, he was Commanding Officer of the submarine USS L-4 between 1916 and 1918, receiving the Navy Cross for "distinguished service" during World War I combat operations against German U-boats. Later in 1918 Lieutenant Commander Hancock commanded another submarine, USS L-7. He also had wartime and post-war tours as a machinery inspector.

During the first years of the 1920s, Hancock served on the battleships USS Georgia and USS Wyoming, commanded the destroyer USS Sloat and had shore duty with the Navy Department and the Department of Commerce.

Assigned to airship duty in 1922, he was designated a Naval Aviator in 1924, while serving with the dirigible Shenandoah (ZR-1). Lieutenant Commander Hancock was the airship's Executive Officer and was killed when it crashed near Caldwell, Ohio on 3 September 1925. He was buried with full military honors in Arlington National Cemetery.

== Construction and commissioning ==
Lewis Hancock was laid down 31 March 1943 by Federal Shipbuilding & Drydock Co., Kearny, N.J.; launched 1 August; sponsored by Lt. Joy Hancock, USNR, widow of Lieutenant Commander Hancock, and the first Wave officer to christen a U.S. combatant ship; and commissioned 29 September 1943.

== World War II ==
Following shakedown out of Bermuda, Lewis Hancock in company with Langley (CVL-27) sailed from New York 6 December for the Pacific; arrived Pearl Harbor on Christmas Day 1943; and joined Vice Admiral Marc A. Mitscher’s Fast Carrier Task Force (then 5th Fleet's TF 58, later 3rd Fleet's TF 38), a mighty naval weapon organized to neutralize Japanese airpower and forward bases in advance of leapfrogging American amphibious operations. On 16 January 1944 Lewis Hancock sortied from Pearl Harbor with Task Group 58.2 (TG 58.2) for the invasion of the Marshall Islands. Assigned the task of neutralizing enemy airpower on Kwajalein Atoll, the flattops in Lewis Hancock’s group smashed the airdrome at Roi on the 29th, destroying every Japanese plane. The next day a second carrier strike hit defensive positions softening enemy emplacements in preparation for landings on the 31st. For the next 3 days planes from the carriers provided close tactical support for the marines who wrested the atoll from the Japanese Emperor. The destroyer returned to Majuro Lagoon on the 4th.

The destroyer accompanied the task force on the first strike against Truk, the major Japanese naval base in the Central Pacific, 16 and 17 February. In this operation Mitscher's ships and planes destroyed several enemy warships, some 200,000 tons of merchant shipping, and about 275 planes.

Lewis Hancock departed the Hawaiian Islands 15 March for 5 months of action in the forward areas. After rejoining TG 58.2, she screened the heavies during a strike on the Palaus late in March and during the capture of Hollandia in April. In May they hit the Marcus-Wake area. On 11 June planes of the task force began the softening-up process against Saipan, Tinian, Guam, and other islands of the Marianas. Normally assigned antiaircraft and antisubmarine duties. Lewis Hancock also bombarded Saipan on the 13th.

The Japanese attempted to counter the American thrust, into the Marianas by striking at the invading task force with their full naval strength. The U.S. carriers, guarded by Lewis Hancock, smashed the enemy fleet in the Battle of the Philippine Sea 19 and 20 June, and thus saved the forces which were conquering the Marianas. Thereafter, the giant flattops continued to support operations in the Marianas and in July raided the Bonins and the Palaus.

Following 2 weeks at Pearl Harbor, Lewis Hancock joined TF 38. Attacks on airstrips in the Philippines, Okinawa, and Formosa followed in rapid succession. On 13 September, during her first raid against the Philippines, Lewis Hancock splashed her first enemy plane. These airstrikes helped to neutralize Japan's airpower and soften up her defenses for General Douglas MacArthur’s long-awaited return to the Philippines. The U.S. troops landed on the beaches of Leyte, and Japan struck back with her full fleet in effort to stem the American advance. In the ensuing Battle of Leyte Gulf, while acting as a picket ship, Lewis Hancock assisted in sinking an enemy destroyer.

Joining the 5th Fleet in February 1945, she participated in a series of raids against the Japanese home islands striking Tokyo on the 16th and 25th and the Kobe-Osaka area 19 March. During the later raid, DD-675 splashed her final enemy planes, numbers 5 and 6.

On 1 April the Navy placed the American flag on the doorstep of Japan with the landings on Okinawa. Lewis Hancock supported the struggle for that bitterly contested island until heading for home 10 May.

Miraculously undamaged and having suffered only four casualties during 16 months in the Pacific, this veteran steamed into San Francisco 6 July. Released from drydock overhaul 30 August, Lewis Hancock was girding herself to return to the war when the Japanese surrendered. She arrived San Diego 7 September and decommissioned 10 January 1946. Hugh Joseph Hannity, the father of political commentator and author, Sean Patrick Hannity, served on Lewis Hancock from 1943 to 1946, with a final rate of radarman third class.

== 1951 – 1957 ==
The Korean War ended her retirement. On Armed Forces Day, 19 May 1951, she recommissioned at the Naval Station, Long Beach, Calif. On 11 October she departed San Diego for the east coast and arrived Newport, R.I. on the 27th for modernization.

Lewis Hancock departed Newport 6 September 1952, sailed through the Panama Canal, and reached Yokosuka, Japan 20 October. After additional training, she entered Korean waters early in December. Following brief service on the east coast of Korea, she steamed to the embattled peninsula's west coast 18 December and operated with the carrier HMS Glory for the remainder of the year. This Far Eastern deployment ended late in January 1953 when she departed Tokyo Bay for Newport via Southeast Asia, the Middle East, the Suez Canal and the Mediterranean. Her arrival at Newport completed a circumnavigation of the world.

Lewis Hancock now began a pattern of service alternating operations along the east coast with European deployments. In October she sailed for 4 months in European waters. She sailed for home 24 January 1954 and operated along the Atlantic coast until heading back toward Europe in May 1955 for 4 months of joint operations with the British Home Fleet and operations with the Spanish Navy, before returning to Newport late in August.

The destroyer operated in the western Atlantic until the rising tension in the Middle East called her back to the volatile Mediterranean. The destroyer got underway 15 April 1956, transited the Suez Canal 9 May and operated in the Red Sea and Persian Gulf. She returned to the Mediterranean, one of the last ships to pass through the Suez Canal before it closed, and arrived home 14 August.

Following a period of refresher training and plane guard duty, Lewis Hancock departed Newport 6 May 1957, again heading east. In between 6th Fleet exercises the destroyer operated for 5 weeks in the Red Sea, Gulf of Aden, and Indian Ocean. Lewis Hancock concluded this last foreign cruise at Newport 31 August. She arrived at Philadelphia 24 September, decommissioned there 18 December 1957, and entered the Atlantic Reserve Fleet.

== CT Piaui (D 31) ==
Brought out of mothballs and modernized, Lewis Hancock was transferred to the government of Brazil on 1 August 1967, and was commissioned on the same day in the Brazilian Navy as CT Piaui (D 31).

Piaui was stricken and broken up for scrap in 1989.

== Awards ==
Lewis Hancock received nine battle stars for World War II service, and two for Korean service.
