= Elise Ford =

American painter (1912–1963)

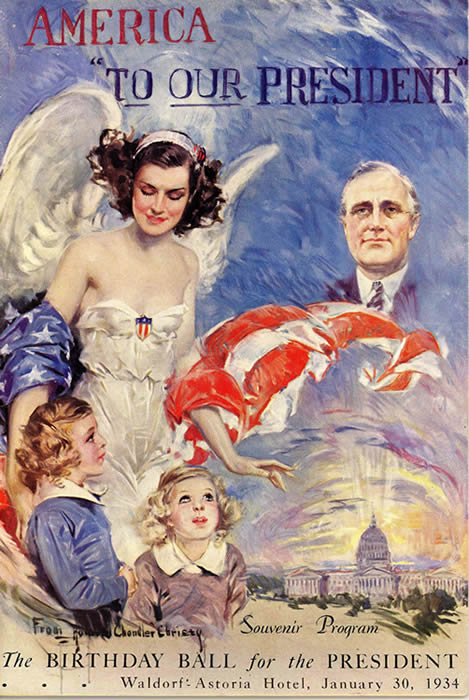
Elise Ford on the poster for the 1934 FDR Birthday Ball.

Elise Ford née Sophie Elise Forsberg (November 27, 1912 – July 23, 1963) was an American painter, who was a student and a favorite model of Howard Chandler Christy. She posed for many of Christy's well-known patriotic posters, including 1941 "I am An American" personifying America "rushing forward to give the touch of the contagion of liberty and democracy to the rest of the world" in the words of then New York Mayor Fiorello H. La Guardia. In mid-1930s she posed for Christy's posters for the annual Franklin D. Roosevelt charitable birthday balls to raise funds to fight infantile paralysis. Elise Ford, 40 years younger than Christy, was his companion for over 20 years until his death in 1952, and she is the mother of Christy's out-of-wedlock daughter Holly.

Sophie Elise Forsberg was born in New Rochelle, New York as the fourth child of Carl Theodore Forsberg, an engineer, and Sophia L. Maxmann. She went to Montclair, New Jersey High School where "she has won many medals for swimming, running and public speaking". She then studied singing and acting at Alvienne Theater and Dramatic Arts school in New York City. She also finished a two-year night course in textile design and printing processes at Pratt Institute.

She died in St. Petersburg, Florida.
