= Yeoman (F) =

Enlisted rate for women in the U.S. Naval Reserve during World War I

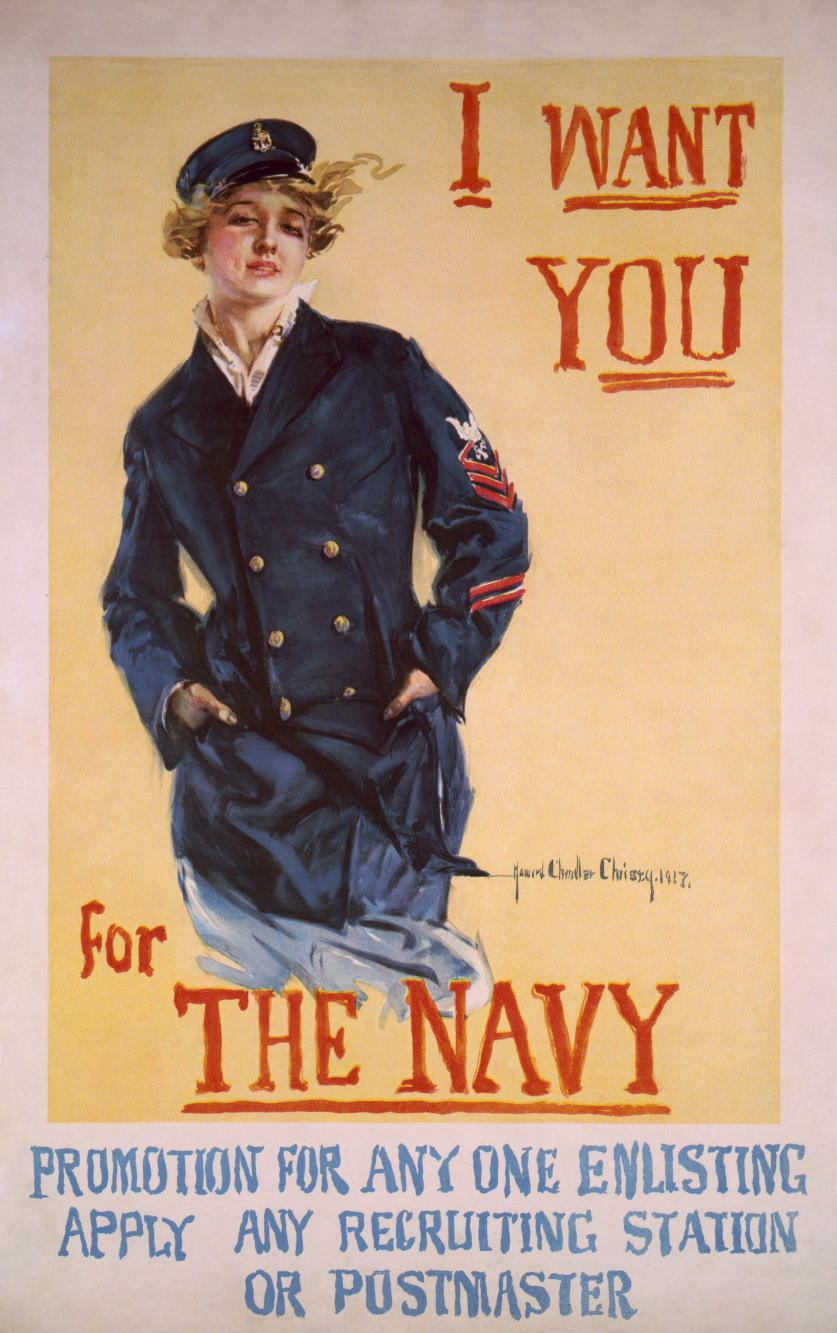
A 1917 recruitment poster illustrated by Howard Chandler Christy

Yeoman (F) was an enlisted rating for women in the U.S. Naval Reserve during World War I. The first Yeoman (F) was Loretta Perfectus Walsh. At the time, the women were popularly referred to as "yeomanettes" or even "yeowomen", although the official designation was Yeoman (F).

The U.S. Naval Reserve Act of 1916 permitted the enlistment of qualified "persons" for service; Secretary of the Navy Josephus Daniels asked, "Is there any law that says a Yeoman must be a man?" and was told there was not. He began enlisting women as Yeoman (F), and in less than a month the Navy officially swore in the first female sailor in U.S. history.

Typically, female Yeoman reservists performed clerical duties such as typing, stenography, bookkeeping, accounting, inventory control, and telephone operation. A few became radio operators, electricians, draftsmen, pharmacists, photographers, telegraphers, fingerprint experts, chemists, torpedo assemblers and camouflage designers. Female Yeomen did not attend boot camp. A large number were stationed in Washington, D.C., while others served in naval stations, hospitals, shipyards and munitions factories around the country. Many recruiting stations employed the women who volunteered there as very effective recruiters, and as many as forty women served in England, France, Puerto Rico, the Virgin Islands, the Canal Zone, Guam, and the Territory of Hawaii.

Without new technologies, the Navy would never have had enough jobs to employ 11,274 female Yeomen. Also, having women in uniform was a positive image for the Navy to project. As well as their many military duties, the women were taught to march and drill at public rallies, recruiting campaigns, war bond drives, and troop send-offs.

== The military's first enlisted women ==
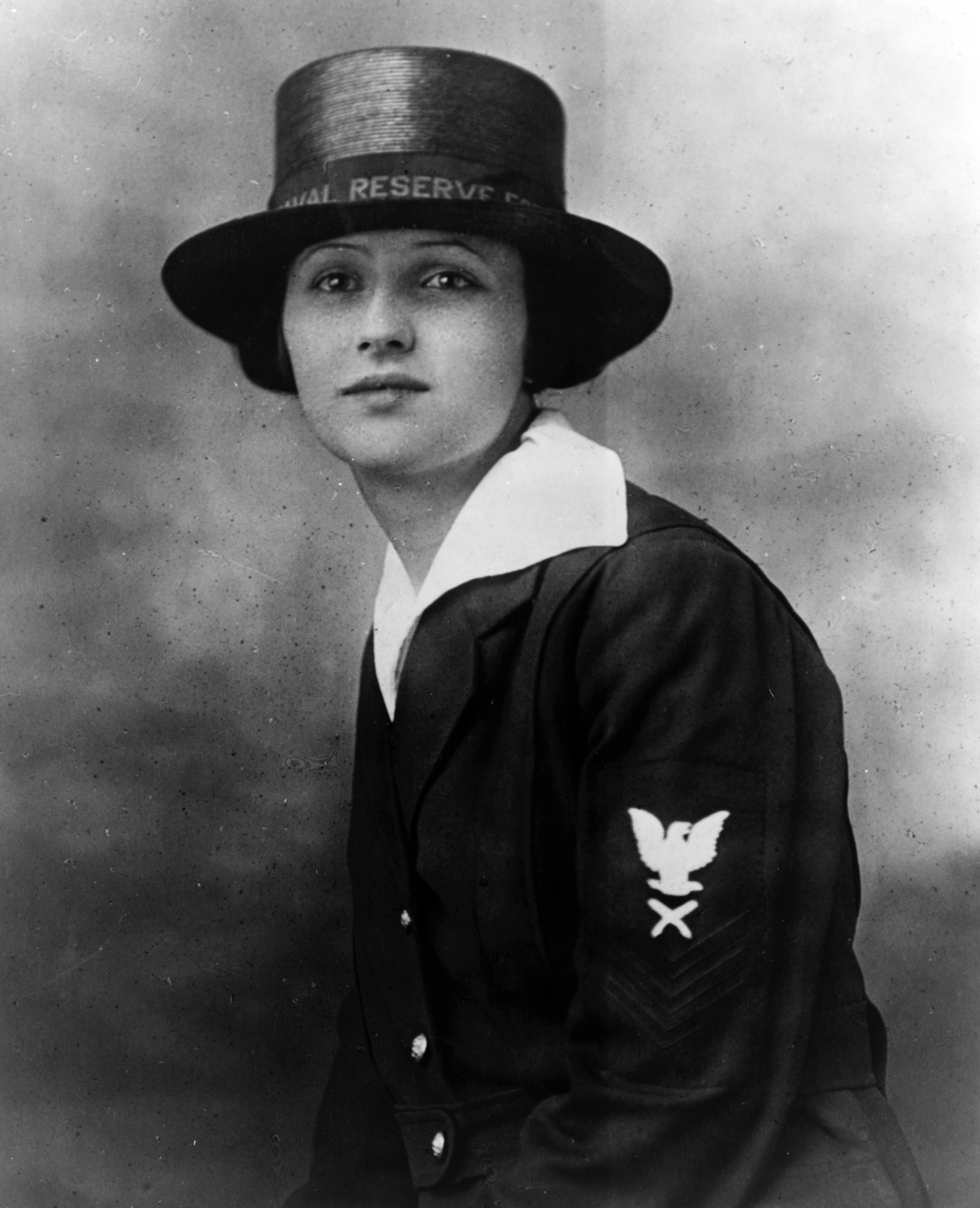
Joy Bright as a Reservist in 1918

Women had served in the United States military before World War I. In 1901, a female Nurse Corps was established in the Army Medical Department, and in 1908 a Navy Nurse Corps was established. However, despite their uniforms the nurses were civilian employees with few benefits. They slowly gained additional privileges, including "relative ranks" and insignia in 1920, a retirement pension in 1926, and a disability pension if injured in the line of duty in 1926. Edith Nourse Rogers, one of the first women to serve in Congress, voted to support the pensions.

The first American women enlisted into the regular armed forces were 13,000 women admitted into active duty in the Navy and Marines during World War I, and a much smaller number admitted into the Coast Guard. The Yeoman (F) recruits and women Marines primarily served in clerical positions. They received the same benefits and responsibilities as men, including identical pay (US$28.75 per month), and were treated as veterans after the war. These women were quickly demobilized when hostilities ceased, and aside from the Nurse Corps, the soldiery became once again exclusively male.

Some black women served as Yeomen (F) and were the first black women to serve as enlisted members of the U.S. armed forces. These first black women to serve in the United States Navy were 16 Yeomen (F)—the total would rise to 24—from some of "Washington's elite black families" who "worked in the Muster Roll division at Washington's Navy Yard...."

== Uniforms ==
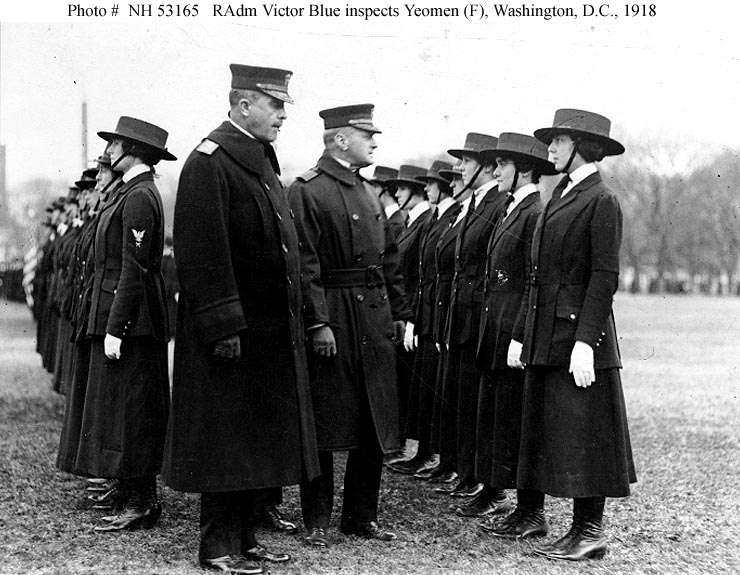
Yeomen (F) being inspected by Rear Admiral Victor Blue (left center), Chief of the Bureau of Navigation, on the Washington Monument grounds, Washington, D.C., in 1918

Two uniforms were prescribed for women in the USNRF. A winter uniform of navy blue serge alternated with a summer uniform of white drill. Both consisted of a single-breasted Norfolk style coat with gilt buttons and a rating badge on the left sleeve, worn over a skirt of the same fabric and shirt waist. The coat had patch pockets on each hip and a belt. The skirt was hemmed to four inches above the ankle, and the shirt waist was designed to be worn either open at the neck or buttoned. Hats were to be flat-brimmed sailor hats of navy blue felt or straw. Shoes, hose, gloves and a standard Navy neckerchief completed the outfit. Capes were also prescribed for cold weather.

Bids on the contract for the new uniforms closed on June 18, 1917. The first woman, Loretta Perfectus Walsh, had enlisted in March 1917, with no uniform specified, so various uniforms had been devised from interpretations of existing men's uniforms. Local adaptations were also made to accommodate those working in non-clerical jobs.

== Post-World War I ==
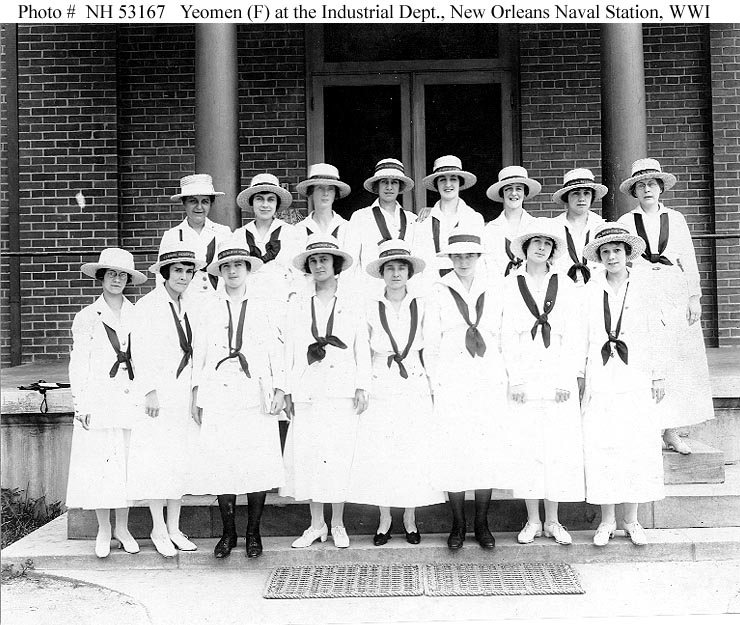
Yeomen (F) attached to the Industrial Department, U.S. Naval Station, New Orleans, Louisiana, during World War I

Initially offered general discharges, the women veterans successfully lobbied for honorable discharges in recognition of their service. Many continued in government service as civilians. Women veterans joined the newly created American Legion in large numbers, forming posts that were all female or overwhelmingly female in larger cities or joining "mixed" units in other areas. The first all-woman American Legion post was formed in Boston, Massachusetts, with Daisy May Pratt Erd as its first commander.

The National Yeoman (F) Association began in 1926 and was chartered in 1936 under Title 36 of the United States Code with Pub. L. 676–74 (menu; GPO has not yet published law).

The last surviving Yeoman (F) was Yeoman Second Class (F) Charlotte Winters, who died on March 27, 2007, in Boonsboro, Maryland.

== See also ==
- Edith Nourse Rogers
- Joy Bright Hancock
- Bernice Tongate
- History of the United States Navy
- History of women in the military
- Women in the United States Navy
