= Mary F. Johnson =

English Romantic poet (1779–1863)

- Born: Mary Fitchett Johnson; 25 October 1779; Newport, Isle of Wight
- Died: 1 March 1863 (aged 83); Bridge of Earn, Perth, Scotland
- Occupation: Poet
- Spouse: George Moncrieff
- Children: 1

Mary Fitchett Johnson (25 October 1779 – 1 March 1863) was an English Romantic poet.

== Biography ==
Mary Fitchett Johnson was born on 25 October 1779, in Newport, Isle of Wight. She published Original Sonnets, and Other Poems in 1810 when she was living in Wroxall, Isle of Wight. She describes the poems as "the first attempt of a secluded, unknown and inexperienced female", and written for amusement and the relief of pressure. The poems treat conventional Romantic subjects such as the moods and the natural world, and one of them responds to the poetry of Mary Robinson. The collection received generally favourable reviews for its taste and feeling. According to Johnson's cousin, who submitted her last poem "A Dream of the Isle of Wight" to the Gentleman's Magazine soon after her death, "for some mysterious reason, she suppressed the sale of the book."

Johnson married George Moncrieff in 1814 and they had a daughter, Georgiana. Johnson died on 1 March 1863, in Bridge of Earn, Perth.
