= Gladys Powers =

- Born: 10 May 1899; Lewisham, London, England
- Died: 15 August 2008 (aged 109); Abbotsford, British Columbia, Canada
- Military career
- Allegiance: United Kingdom
- Branch: Women's Army Auxiliary Corps; Royal Air Force; the Women's Royal Air Force
- Service years: 1915–1920
- Conflicts: World War I

Gladys Stokes Luxford Powers (10 May 1899 – 15 August 2008) was thought to be, at age 109, the last female veteran of the First World War following the 27 March 2007 death of fellow 109-year-old Charlotte Winters from the United States. However the subsequent discovery of fellow Britons Ivy Campany, who died on 19 December 2008, and Florence Green has disproved this. Regardless, Powers was the last veteran living in Canada, following the death of Dwight Wilson on 9 May 2007, the day before Powers' 108th birthday. The last Canadian-born veteran, 109-year-old John Babcock, later moved to the United States where he lived until his death on 18 February 2010.

== Biography ==
Powers was born in Lewisham, County of London, the daughter of Frederick Charles Stokes. During her childhood she lived in both Turkey and Australia. In 1915, she volunteered as a barracks waitress for the WAAC despite the minimum age being 17. Later she transferred to the Royal Air Force; the WRAF. In 1920, she married Edward Luxford, a Canadian soldier, whom she had met while visiting her older brother, Cyril, in hospital, where the latter was recovering from shell shock incurred during the war.

The Luxfords moved to Calgary that year, and walked almost 1000 kilometres along the Canadian Pacific Railway tracks to British Columbia in 1925. They later divorced and Powers remarried and was widowed twice, before meeting and marrying Andrew Powers in 1973, whom she also outlived. She lived in Abbotsford from 1992 until her death in 2008.

It is locally said that Cyril Street and Gladys Avenue in Abbotsford are named after the siblings.

Powers died in Abbotsford on 15 August 2008, at the age of 109.
