= Howard Chandler Christy =

American illustrator and painter (1872–1952)

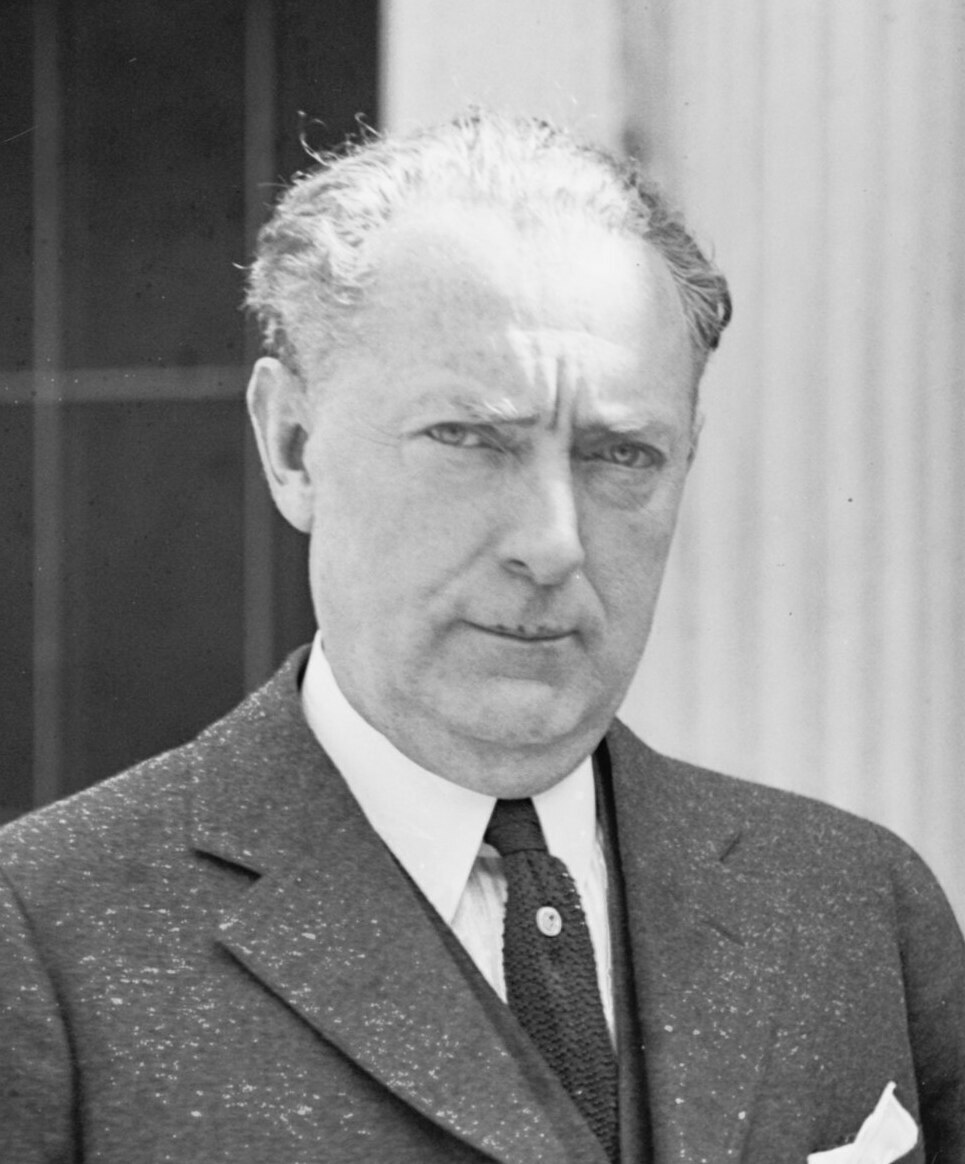
- Christy in 1922
- Born: January 10, 1872; Morgan County, Ohio, U.S.
- Died: March 3, 1952 (aged 80); Manhattan, New York City, New York, U.S.
- Occupations: artist and illustrator
- Years active: 1890–1952
- Notable work: Gee I wish I were a Man I'd Join the Navy, Portrait of Dorothy Barton Thomas, Scene at the Signing of the Constitution of the United States, The Christy Girl

Howard Chandler Christy (January 10, 1872 – March 3, 1952) was an American artist and illustrator. Famous for the "Christy Girl" – a colorful and illustrious successor to the "Gibson Girl" – Christy is also widely known for his iconic WWI military recruitment and Liberty loan posters, along with his 1940 masterpiece titled, Scene at the Signing of the Constitution of the United States, which is installed along the east stairwell of the United States Capitol.

From the 1920s until the early 1950s, Christy was active as a portrait painter whose sitters included presidents, senators, industrialists, movie stars, and socialites. He painted Lt. Col. Theodore Roosevelt, and Presidents Warren G. Harding, Calvin Coolidge, Herbert Hoover, Franklin Delano Roosevelt, and Harry Truman. Other famous people he painted include William Randolph Hearst, Edward VIII, Eddie Rickenbacker, Benito Mussolini, Prince Umberto, and Amelia Earhart. By 1938, Time magazine described Christy as "the most commercially successful U.S. artist."

== Early life and education ==
Christy was born in Morgan County, Ohio into a family that traced its lineage back to the Mayflower Compact. He attended early school in Duncan Falls, Ohio.

He then attended the Art Students League of New York in New York City from 1890 to 1891 and then at the National Academy under William Merritt Chase, first at Chase's summer retreat at Shinnecock Hills, New York on Long Island, and then at his 10th Street Studio. Christy's tutelage under Chase ended when he was inspired by the work of Charles Dana Gibson and decided to pursue illustration as a career instead of portrait painting.

== Early work ==
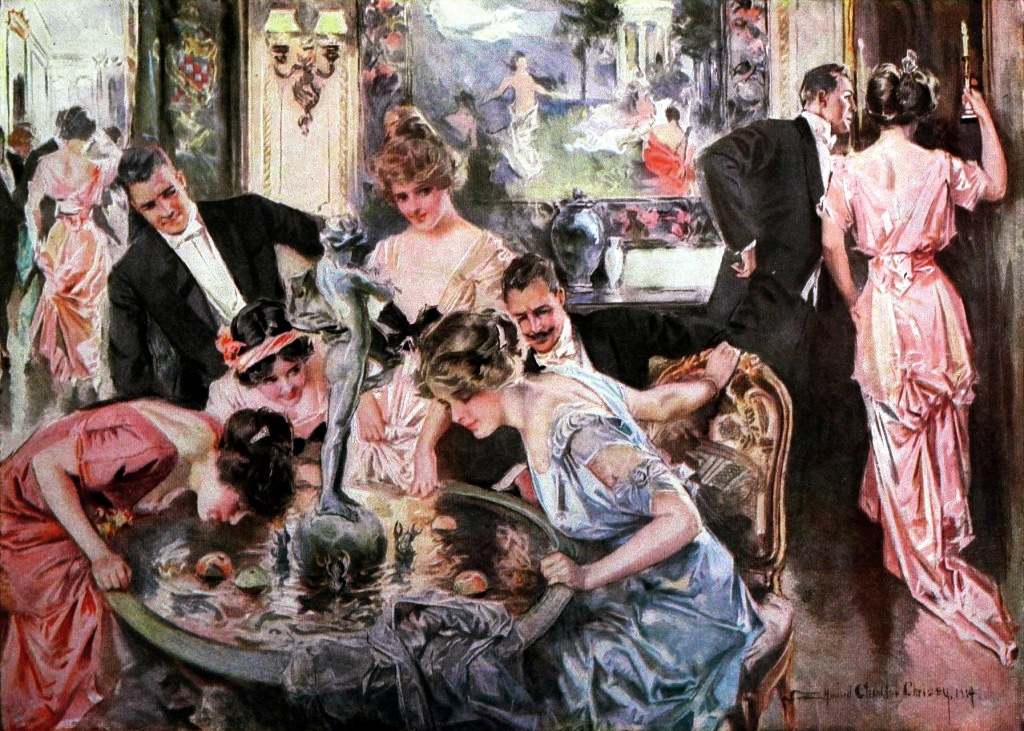
Christy's 1915 painting Halloween, published in the January 1916 issue of Scribner's Magazine

The first book he illustrated was In Camphor, published in 1919.

== National recognition ==
Christy first attracted national attention with his realistic illustrations and several articles as a combat artist during the Spanish–American War that included the Battle of Las Guasimas, the Battle of El Caney, and the Battle of San Juan Hill, published in Scribner's, Harper's, and Leslie's Weekly magazines, and in Collier's Weekly. Christy gained especial prominence with the series, Men of the Army and Navy, and a portrait of Colonel Roosevelt that appeared on the cover of his Rough Riders series published in Scribner's.

From this, he decided to turn away from war and painting men in uniform. Instead, he yearned for beauty and created the "Christy Girl", redefining the portrayal of women in America through his illustrations and portraits. Christy was inspired by his first wife Maebelle Gertrude (née Thompson) to create the character "The Christy Girl.". He captured the modern American woman – tall, confident, elegant, witty, and athletic.

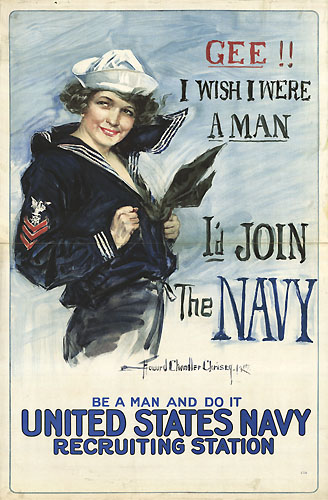
"Gee!! I wish I were a man, I'd join the Navy Be a man and do it" - United States Navy recruiting station. Made by Christy in 1917 featuring Bernice Tongate

Christy’s work was so popular in the early 1900s that it often appeared in magazines. Many of the women Christy captured were real women found in everyday life. There were competitions held in magazines such as the Washington Herald section "Where is She? The Christy Girl of Washington!" The magazine called for women of Washington to send pictures of themselves or someone they knew to be chosen by Christy. There was an award of $25 for the woman's photograph that was chosen, which is about $861.64 in today's value.

But when WWI started Christy shifted to more patriotic imagery. “The Christy Girls” became part of the WWI poster propaganda. Christy used Christy Girls during World War I as part of the Committee on Public Information in the Department of Pictorial Publicity, which Woodrow Wilson established to mobilize America's support for joining the war. During the war Christy produced 40 posters towards the war efforts each showcasing a Christy Girl and Danielle Mullan, a writer at The Lafayette, said that Christy’s most effective poster was Gee!! I Wish I Were a Man! which he credited to help enlist 25,000 men.

He painted patriotic posters for the US Navy and US Marine Corps. He is also known for his illustrations of the works of such as the well-known war correspondent, Richard Harding Davis.

He illustrated books during this period as well.

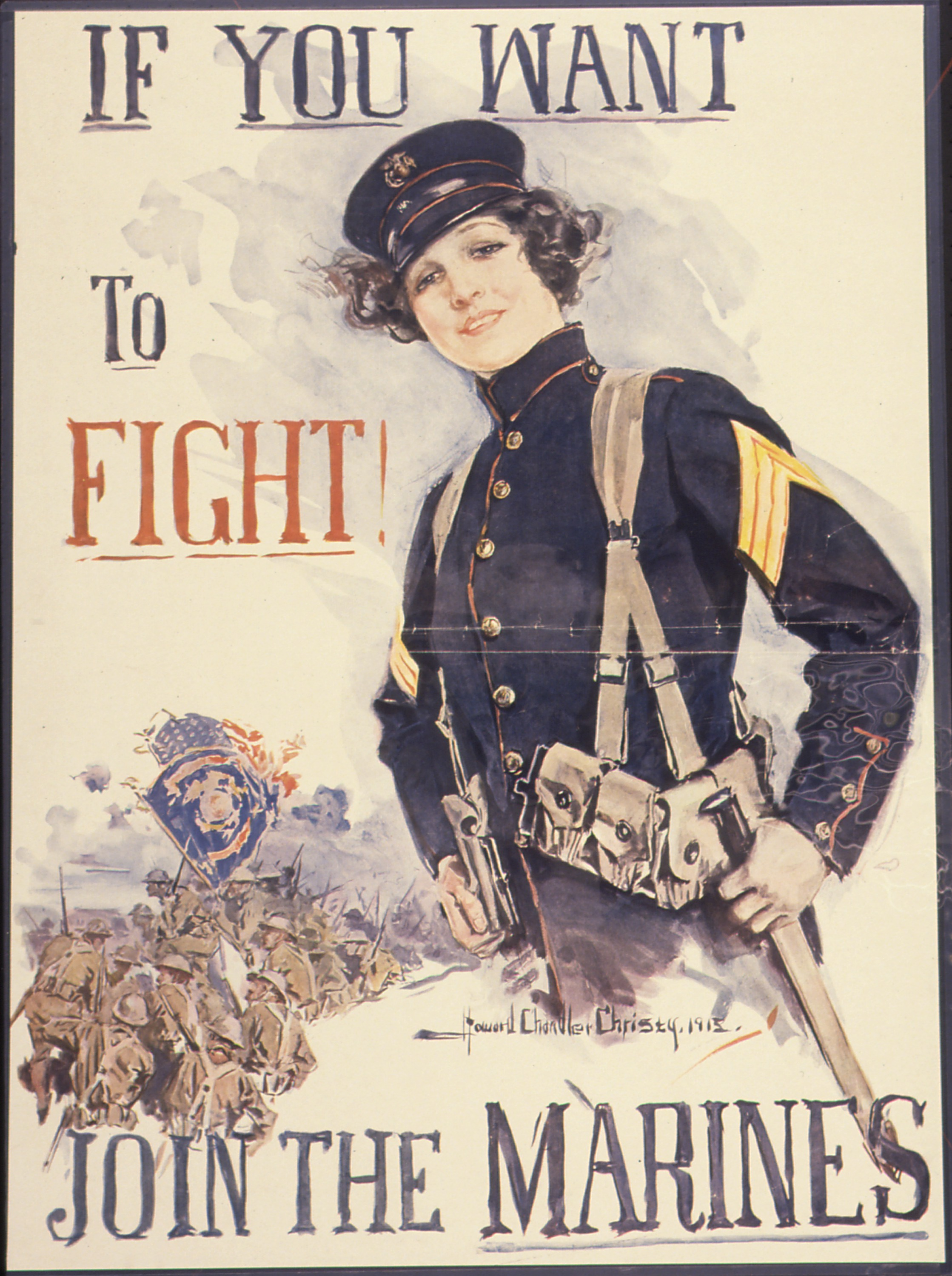
If You Want to Fight! Join the Marines, c. 1915

Having made his reputation for his work as a combat artist and in support of America's World War I effort, Christy soon was illustrating for numerous magazine covers. He became famous for the "Christy Girl", a picturesque and romantic type of society women uniquely his own. His work, whether in watercolor, oils, or pen-and-ink, is characterized by great facility, a dashing but not exaggerated style and a strong sense of values. Together with fellow artists Harrison Fisher and Neysa McMein he constituted the Motion Picture Classic magazine's "Fame and Fortune" contest jury of 1921–22, that discovered the It girl, Clara Bow.

In 1924, Christy painted the official portrait of First Lady Grace Coolidge featuring her white collie Rob Roy, that was hung in the Red Room of the White House and has been displayed in the China Room since the Kennedy administration.

During the Great Depression, Christy found new success as a muralist and painter of historical events. In 1934 he painted a series of female nudes to decorate the New York City restaurant Café des Artistes. Some of Christy's works, newly cleaned, are on display at The Leopard at des Artistes restaurant, the successor to the Café des Artistes. They include six panels of wood nymphs and paintings such as The Parrot Girl, The Swing Girl, Ponce De Leon, Fall, Spring, and the Fountain of Youth.

In 1940, he painted the Scene at the Signing of the Constitution of the United States, which was installed in the House of Representatives wing in the United States Capitol.

Christy's Portrait of Dorothy Barton Thomas is in the permanent collection at the Zanesville Museum of Art in Zanesville, Ohio, along with other Christy posters, prints and paintings in their collection. Another of Christy's paintings was displayed at the Gettysburg Museum and Visitor Center. The National Museum of American Illustration in Newport, RI, has a large collection of works by Christy.

A Christy hangs above a desk and typewriter in Jack London's cottage, located in Jack London State Historic Park, Glen Ellen, California.

== Personal life ==
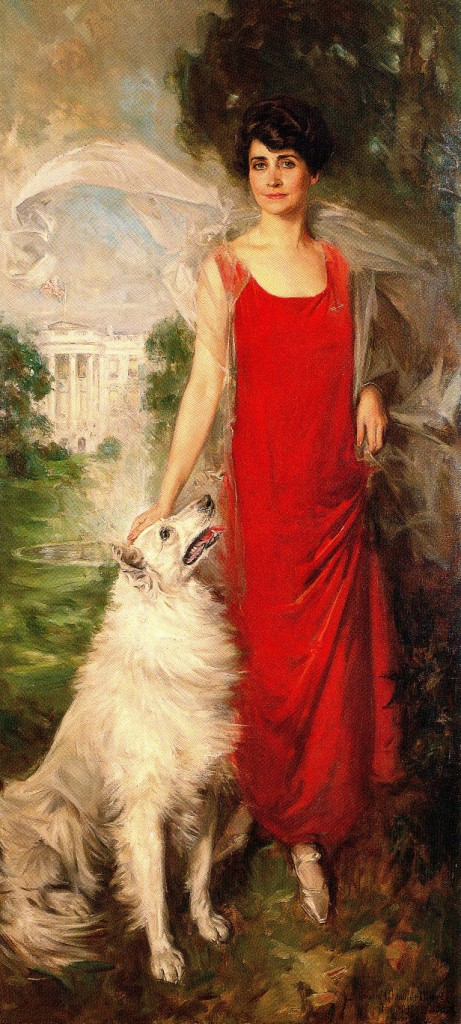
Official portrait of First Lady Grace Coolidge, 1924

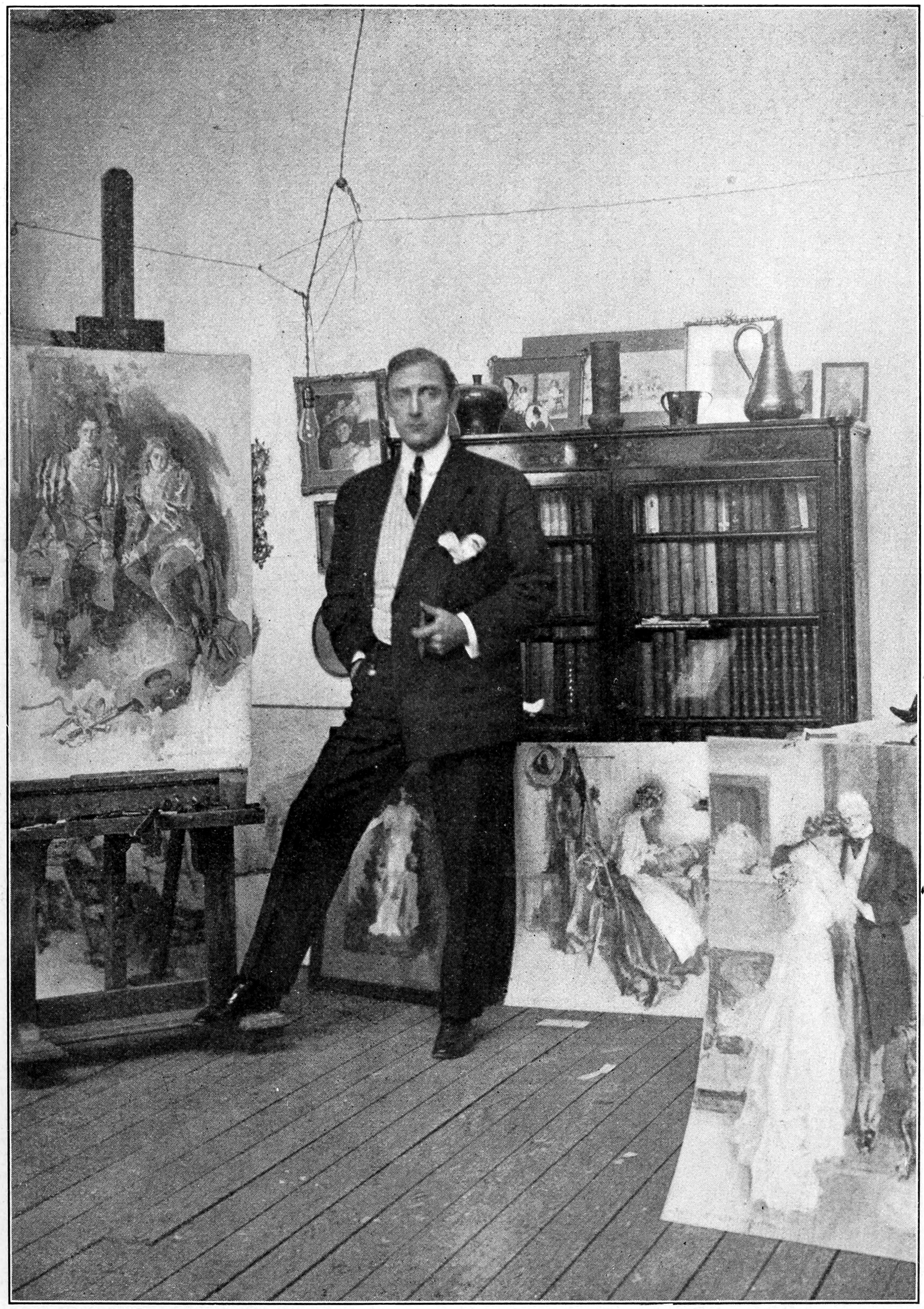
Christy in his studio

Christy was married twice, both times to women who had modeled for him as one of his "Christy Girls". The first was Maebelle Gertrude Thompson, whom he married on October 15, 1898, shortly after his return from the Spanish–American War. They had a daughter named Natalie Chandler Christy. They finally divorced in May 1919, after over ten years of periodic separation, bitter divorce, and custody battles.

His second marriage was to Nancy Mae (née Coone) Palmer, a widow who had modeled for and lived with him for over eight years prior to their marriage.

In the early 1930s, he met Elise Ford who became his model for the murals on Café des Artistes wall. Elise Ford was also Christy's model for the 1941 I Am An American poster personifying America "rushing forward to give the touch of the contagion of liberty and democracy to the rest of the world" in the words of then New York Mayor Fiorello H. La Guardia. Forty years his junior, she became Christy's companion until his death at age 80. They had a daughter named Holly (Holly Christina Longuski née Holly Ford) born in 1939 while he was painting Scene at the Signing of the Constitution of the United States.

Christy was the cousin of actor Chick Chandler.

== Legacy ==
Attorney and author James Philip Head wrote a novelistic biography of Christy, The Magic of Youth, published in 2016. It is the first book in a projected trilogy titled An Affair with Beauty - The Mystique of Howard Chandler Christy. Romantic Illusions, the second installment in the trilogy, was released in March 2019.

Helen Frances Copley (1935–2021) documented her research in finding the location of many of Christy in her 1999 book "The Christy Quest". Copley's viewing of Christy's painting of "The Christ". - also known as "The Head of the Christ" - - led her to ten years of research to better understand the man behind the unusual portrayal of Jesus. In 2017, Copley donated her substantial collection of items related to Christy's career as a book and magazine illustrator and the Christy Girl to Laffayette College in Easton, Pennsylvania.

== Gallery ==
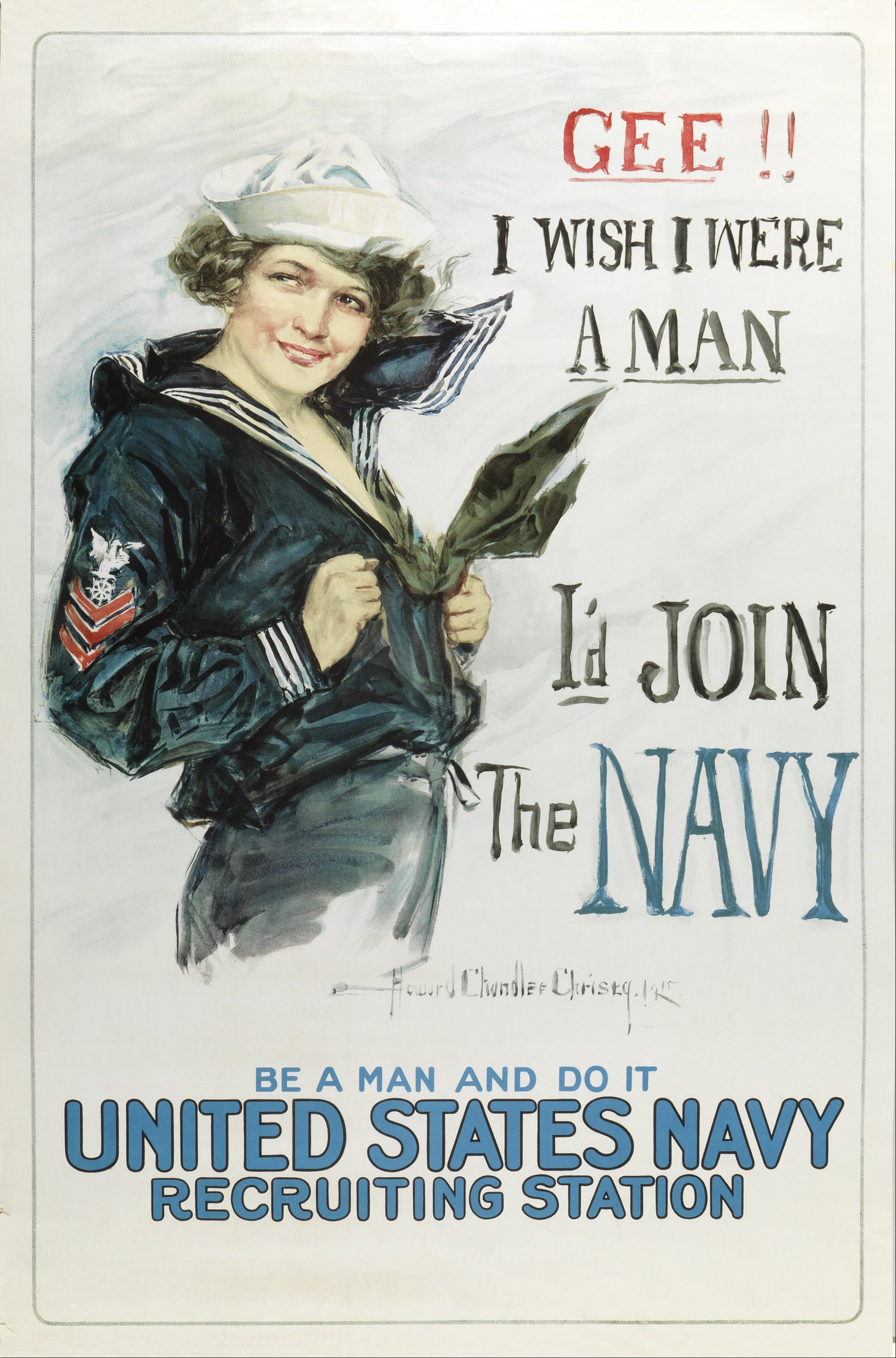
Gee I wish I were a Man, I'd Join the Navy, 1917

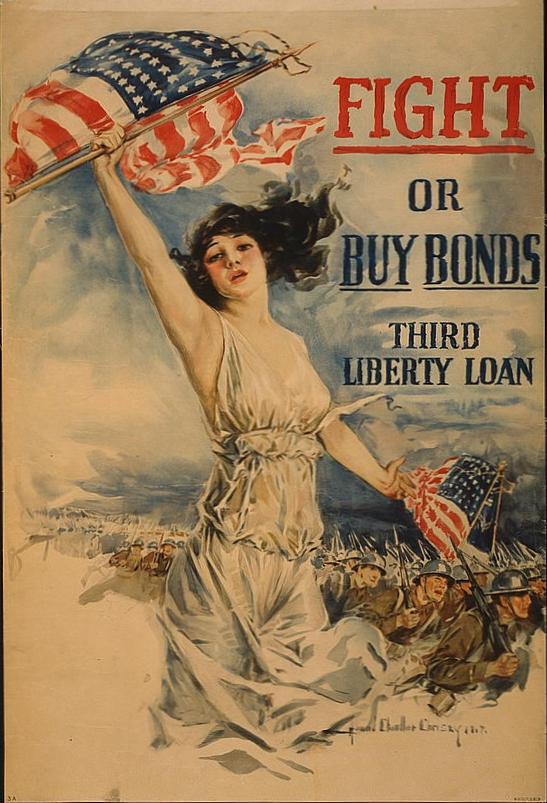
Fight or buy bonds. Third Liberty Loan, 1917

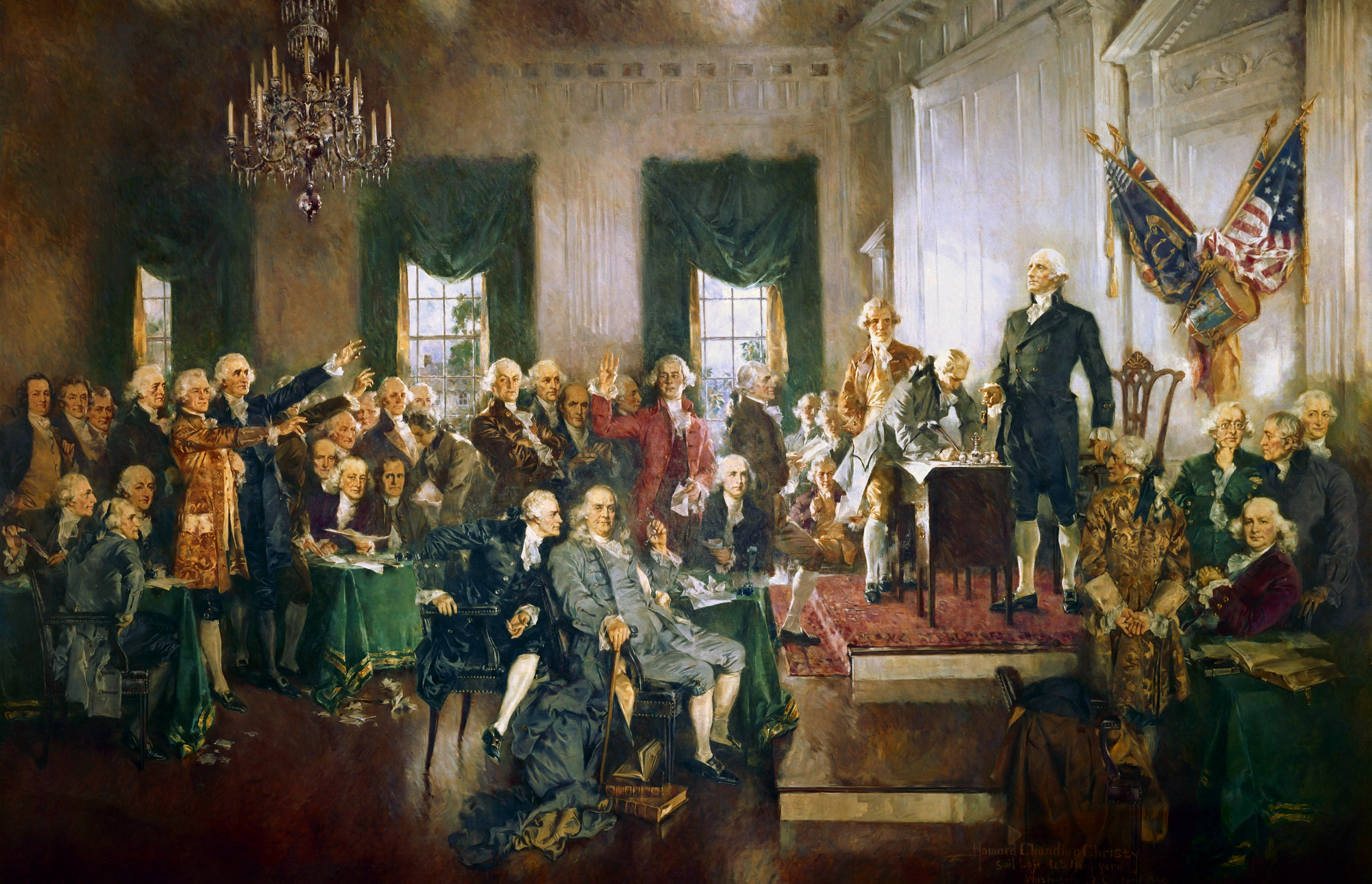
Scene at the Signing of the Constitution of the United States, 1940

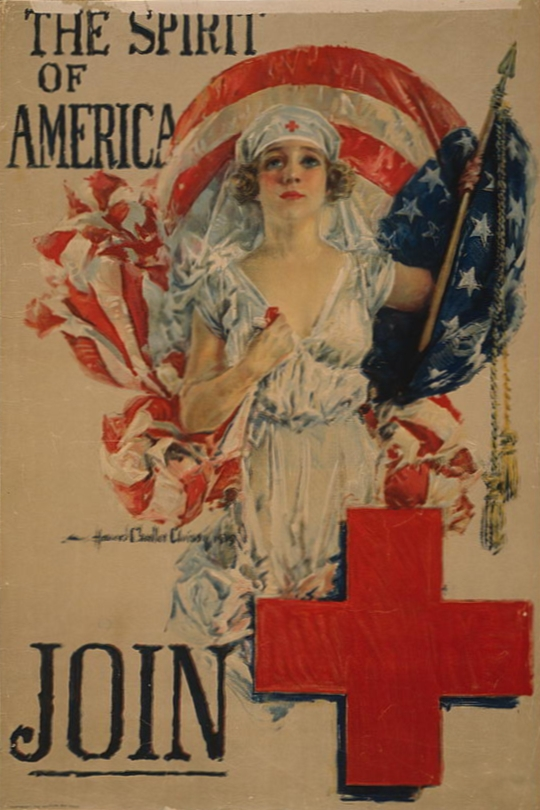
The Spirit of America, 1919

== Selected publications ==
- Baskind, Samantha, “Allegory vs. Authenticity: The Commission and Reception of Howard Chandler Christy's The Signing of the Constitution of the United States,” Winterthur Portfolio 46, no. 1 (Spring 2012): 63-92.
- Christy, Howard Chandler. The American Girl. New York: Moffat, Yard and Co, 1906. OCLC 732893
- Christy, Howard Chandler, and E. Stetson Crawford. The Christy Girl. Indianapolis: The Bobbs-Merrill Co, 1906. OCLC 543943
