= Loretta Perfectus Walsh =

United States Navy sailor

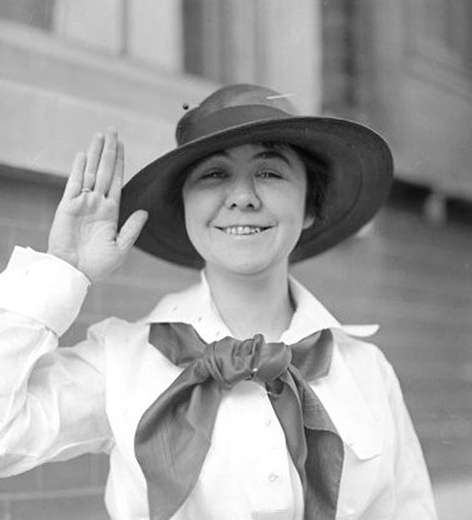
- Walsh in 1917
- Born: April 22, 1896; Philadelphia, Pennsylvania, U.S.
- Died: August 6, 1925 (aged 29); Olyphant, Pennsylvania, U.S.
- Military career
- Allegiance: United States
- Service years: 1917–1921
- Rank: Chief yeoman
- Unit: Naval Reserve Force

Loretta Perfectus Walsh (April 22, 1896 – August 6, 1925) was an American sailor and the first woman to officially serve in the United States Armed Forces in a non-nursing capacity. She joined the United States Naval Reserve on March 17, 1917, and subsequently became the first female petty officer in the Naval Reserve when she was sworn in as Chief Yeoman on March 21, 1917.

== Early life ==
Loretta Walsh was born in 1896 in Philadelphia, Pennsylvania. Her given name may have been "Loretto" rather than "Loretta," as both her Navy records and her signature in a prayer book use this spelling.

== Career ==
War events quickly led up to Walsh's decision to enlist in the United States Navy. World War I was in its fourth year when, on January 31, 1917, the Germans announced they would resume unrestricted submarine warfare on all ships, including those sailing under the United States flag. On February 23, 1917, American opinion further was angered when America learned of Berlin's proposal to Mexico to join the war as Germany's ally against the U.S. Over the next few weeks, four American ships fell victim to German U-boats, causing the death of fifteen Americans.

On March 12, 1917, all American merchant ships were ordered to be armed in war zones. On March 13, 1917, these armed merchant ships were authorized to take action against German U-boats. It was in the face of this adversity challenging the United States that Walsh made her decision to enlist in the United States military.

At age 20, on March 17, 1917, Walsh engaged in a four-year enlistment in the U.S. Navy, becoming the first active-duty Navy woman, the first woman to enlist in the Navy, and the first woman to serve in any of the armed forces in a non-nurse occupation. On March 19, 1917, the Navy Department authorized enrollment of women in Naval Reserve with ratings of yeoman, radio electrician, or other essential ratings, becoming the first branch of the United States armed forces to allow enlistment by women in a non-nursing capacity. Walsh subsequently became the first woman Navy petty officer when she was sworn in as Chief Yeoman on March 21, 1917.

12 days after Walsh was sworn in as Chief Yeoman, President Woodrow Wilson went before the U.S. Congress late on April 2 to ask for a declaration of war, which Congress did on April 6, 1917.

The war ended on November 11, 1918. Walsh and other female yeomen, all of whom held enlisted ranks, continued in service during the first months after the November 1918 Armistice was signed. However, as a result of the post-World War I Naval reductions, the number of Yeomen (F) declined steadily, reaching just under four thousand by the end of July 1919, when Walsh and the remaining Yeomen (F) were all released from active duty. Walsh continued on inactive reserve status, receiving modest retainer pay, until the end of her four-year enlistment on March 17, 1921.

=== Death ===
Walsh fell victim to influenza in the fall of 1918, later contracting tuberculosis. She died on August 6, 1925, at the age of 29 in Olyphant, Pennsylvania. She was buried in Olyphant's St. Patrick's Cemetery, under a monument that reads:

Loretta Perfectus Walsh
April 22, 1896–August 6, 1925
Woman and Patriot
First of those enrolled in the United States Naval Service
World War 1917–1919
Her comrades dedicate this monument
to keep alive forever
memories of the sacrifice and devotion of womanhood

== Legacy ==
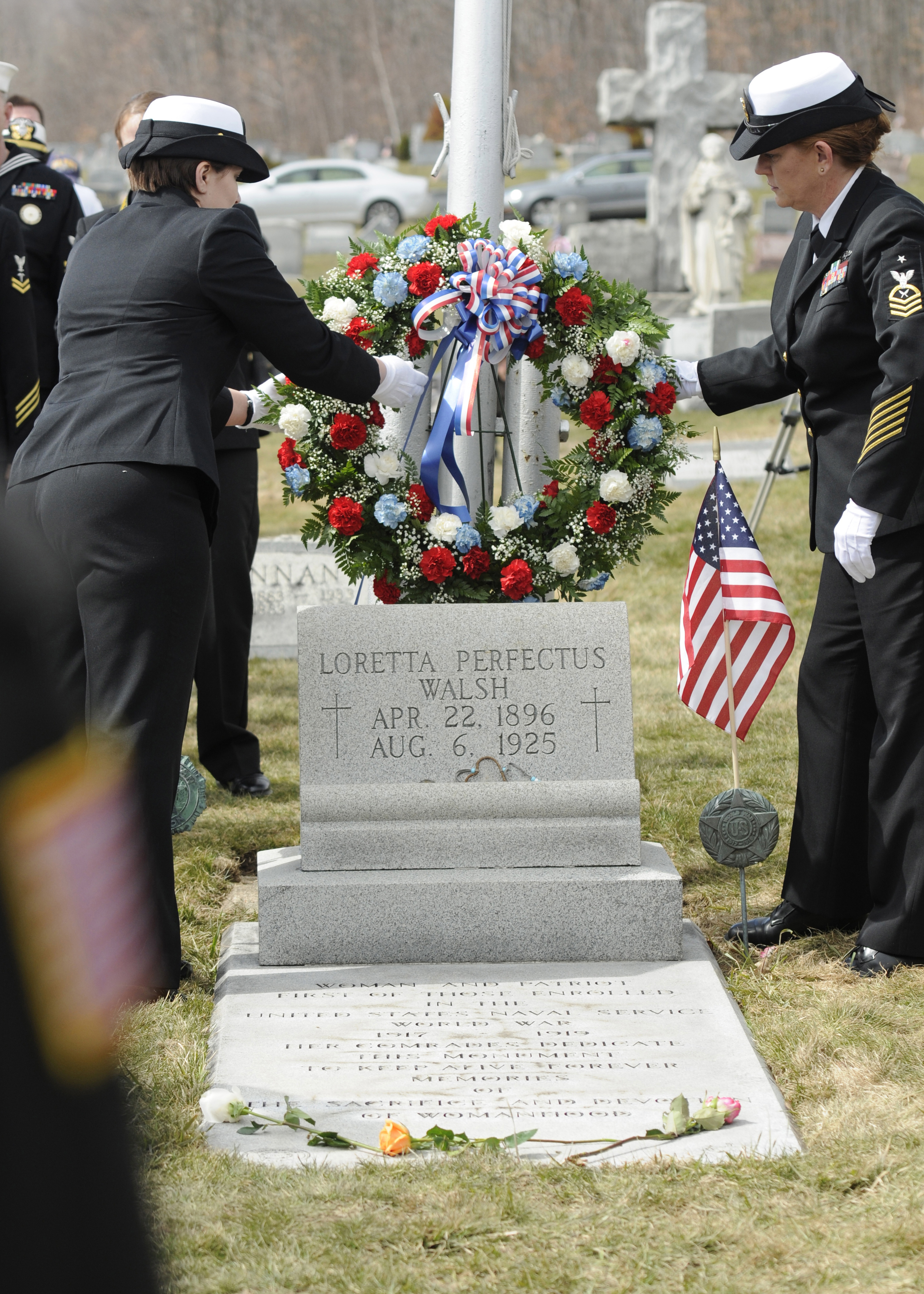
U.S. Navy chief petty officers holding a wreath-laying ceremony at Walsh's resting-place.

In 1917, women had served in the United States military as nurses since 1901. However, despite their uniforms, Army and Navy nurses were civilian employees with few benefits. For example, women lacked "relative ranks" and insignia, retirement pension, disability pension if injured in the line of duty. On enlisting in the Navy in early 1917, Walsh became a Yeoman (F), commonly called Yeomanettes. Yeomanettes primarily served in clerical positions. As a non-nurse, Walsh was the first of 13,000 World War I yeoman females entitled to receive the same benefits and responsibilities as men, including identical pay.

In memory of Walsh and her bold actions on March 21, 1917, the official history program of the Department of the Navy, the Naval Historical Center, identifies March 21, 1917 as a date in American naval history.

There have been some efforts to document Walsh's story. For example, in 1982, former U.S. Navy lieutenant, Jean Ebbert and Mary-Beth Hall set out to document the story of Walsh as the first Navy woman to serve outside the nursing profession. The resulting book, Crossed Currents: Navy Women from WWI to Tailhook, was published in December 1994. It was followed by a second book by the same authors devoted to Navy and Marine Corps women in World War I, The first, the few, the forgotten: Navy and Marine Corps Women in World War I, containing additional information about Walsh.

In 2021, one of the USS Constitution's 24-pound long guns was named "Perfectus" in honor of Walsh's service.

== See also ==
- History of the United States Navy
- History of women in the military
- Women in the United States Navy
- Yeoman (F)
