= Ivy Campany =

British World War I veteran

- Born: 23 September 1901; Hackney, London
- Died: 19 December 2008 (aged 107); Margate, Kent, England, UK
- Military career
- Allegiance: United Kingdom
- Branch: Queen Mary's Army Auxiliary Corps
- Service years: unknown
- Conflicts: World War I World War II

Ivy Lillian Campany (23 September 1901 – 19 December 2008) was, at the age of 107, the penultimate World War I female military veteran of any country. The last was Florence Green (1901–2012), who was not identified as a veteran of the conflict until January 2010. This meant that Campany was believed to be the conflict's last surviving female veteran by the time of her death in December 2008.

== Biography ==
Ivy Lillian Dixon was born in Hackney, London, on 23 September 1901. She had two younger brothers, Leslie and Joseph. By 1911, the family were living in Ramsgate, Kent. She joined the Queen Mary's Army Auxiliary Corps during World War I.

Ivy Dixon married Frederick William Campany in 1922 and had a child, Eric William Campany in 1923. Eric worked in an estate agent‟s office before joining the RAF in 1942. He spent a year at a training school in Canada and was a Flight Sergeant in the RAF's 99 Squadron during the Second World War and died of tropical disease in service age 21 on 15 July 1945 in India and is buried in Bhowanipore Cemetery, Kolkata, Plot O. Row C. Grave 49.

Ivy Campany would later serve as a fire watcher in World War II. She lived in Margate, Kent at the time of her death.
