= Clay (surname) =

Clay is a surname, and may refer to:

== A ==
- Adam Clay (rugby league) (born 1990), English rugby league footballer
- Agnes Muriel Clay (1878–1962), English historian and writer
- Alan Clay (born 1954), New Zealand film director, writer and clown teacher.
- Albert T. Clay (1866–1925), American professor, historian and linguist
- Alex Clay (born 1992), American soccer player
- Alexa Clay (born 1984), American writer and researcher
- Alexander Clay (rugby union) (1863–1950), Scotland rugby union footballer
- Alexander S. Clay (1853–1910), American politician
- Alf Clay (1914–1995), Australian rules footballer
- Alfred Borron Clay (1831–1868), British artist
- Allyson Clay (born 1953), Canadian artist
- Amy Clay (born 1977), American-Australian rower
- Andrew Dice Clay (born 1957), American stand-up comedian and actor
- Angela Clay, American politician and activist from Chicago
- Arlene Clay (1912–2016), American musician, air traffic controller and judge

== B ==
- Barnaby Clay (born 1973), British film and music video director
- Barry Clay (born 1955), Alaskan gold miner
- Beatrice Clay (fl.1886–1925), British educator and children's author
- Bert Clay (1915–1972), Australian rules footballer
- Bertha M. Clay, literary pseudonym used by Charlotte Mary Brame (died 1884) and then her daughter
- Betty Clay (1917–2004), English scout movement figure
- Bill Clay (1931–2025), American politician
- Bill Clay (baseball) (1874–1917), American baseball player
- Billy Clay (born 1944), American football player
- Bob Clay (born 1946), British politician
- Boyd Clay (1915–1978), American football player
- Brian Clay (1935–1987), Australian rugby league footballer
- Brutus J. Clay (1808–1878), American politician from Kentucky, son of Green Clay
- Brutus J. Clay II (1847–1932), American businessman, political figure and diplomat.
- Bryan Clay (born 1980), American decathlete
- Buddy Clay (1894–1967), American baseball player

== C ==
- Caleb Clay (born 1988), American baseball pitcher
- Cassius Clay, later Muhammad Ali (1942–2016), American boxer
- Cassius Marcellus Clay (politician) (1810–1903), American politician and abolitionist
- Cassius Marcellus Clay Sr. (1912–1990), American painter and musician, father of the boxer Muhammad Ali
- Cautious Clay (born 1993), American singer, songwriter and record producer
- Cecil Clay (1842–1903), American Union Army officer
- Charles Clay (American football) (born 1989), American football player
- Charles Clay (patriot) (1745–1820), American minister and politician, brother of Green Clay and Matthew Clay]
- Charles Clay (surgeon) (1801–1893), English surgeon
- Charles Travis Clay (1885–1978), English antiquarian and librarian
- Chuck Clay (born 1950), American politician
- Clarence S. Clay Jr. (1923–2011), American geophysicist and oceanographer
- Clement Claiborne Clay (1816–1882), American politician, son of Clement Comer Clay
- Clement Comer Clay (1789–1866), Governor of Alabama
- Craig Clay (born 1992), English footballer

== D ==
- Dain Clay (1919–1994), American baseball player
- Danny Clay (born 1961), American baseball pitcher
- Darcy Clay (1972–1998), New Zealand singer, songwriter and musician
- Dick Clay (born 1945), Australian rules footballer

== E ==
- Edmund de Clay (died after 1389), English lawyer and judge in Ireland
- Edward Clay (born 1945), British diplomat
- Edward Sneyd Clay (c.1768–1846), British naval officer
- Edward Williams Clay (1799–1857), American artist, illustrator and political cartoonist
- Elisabeth Clay (born 2000), American submission grappler and Brazilian jiu-jitsu practitioner
- Elizabeth Campbell Fisher Clay (1871–1959), American artist and painter
- Eric Clay (1922–2007), British rugby league referee
- Eric L. Clay (born 1948), American judge
- Ethel Clay, later Ethel Clay Price (1874–1943), American nurse and socialite
- Ezekiel F. Clay (1840–1920), Confederate colonel of the American Civil War

== F ==
- Francis Clay (1923–2008), American jazz and blues drummer
- Frank Butner Clay (1921–2006), United States Army officer
- Frank White Clay, American Crow politician from Montana
- Freddie Clay (1927–1983), Indigenous Australian activist on Palm Island, Queensland, husband of Iris Clay
- Frederic Clay (1838–1889), British composer

== G ==
- Genevieve Clay-Smith (born 1988), Australian writer and director
- George H. Clay (1911–1995), American airline executive and banker
- Governor Clay (born 1945), American songwriter and performer
- Grady Clay (1916–2013), American journalist
- Green Clay (1757–1828), American businessman, planter, military officer and politician

== H ==
- Harold Clay (1886–1961), British trade union leader
- Harry Clay (1881–1964), English footballer
- Hayward Clay (born 1973), American football player
- Henry Clay (1777–1852), American statesman and orator
- Henry Clay Jr. (1811–1847), American soldier and statesman, son of Henry Clay
- Henry Clay (economist) (1883–1954), British economist and Warden of Nuffield College, Oxford
- Henry Robinson Clay (1895–1919), American World War I flying ace
- Sir Henry Clay, 6th Baronet (1909–1985), English engineer
- Henry Clay (rower) (born 1955), British rower
- Herbert Clay (1881–1923), American politician
- Herbert Spender-Clay (1875–1937), English soldier and politician

== I ==
- Ivor Clay (1915–1958), Australian rules footballer

== J ==
- Jabez William Clay (1852–1880), American founder of the Phi Sigma Kappa fraternity
- Jack Clay (1926–2019), American actor, acting teacher and director
- Jacob Clay (1882–1955), Dutch physicist
- James Clay (author) (1804–1873), English politician and writer about the game of whist
- James Clay (musician) (1935–1994), American jazz tenor saxophonist and flutist
- James Clay (Pennsylvania politician), member of the Pennsylvania House of Representatives
- James Brown Clay (1817–1864), American politician and diplomat
- James F. Clay (1840–1921), United States Representative from Kentucky
- Jenny Strauss Clay, American ancient politician
- Jo Clay (born 1977), Australian politician
- Joe Clay (1938–2016), American rockabilly musician
- John Clay (Wars of the Roses) (fl.1471), English soldier
- John Clay (chaplain) (1796–1858), English prison chaplain
- John Clay (Nottinghamshire cricketer) (1924–2011), English cricketer
- John Clay (offensive tackle) (born 1964), American football player
- John Clay (running back) (born 1988), American football player
- John Cecil Clay (1875–1930), American illustrator
- John Granby Clay (1766–1846), British general
- John Morrison Clay (1821–1887), American horse breeder
- John P. Clay (1934–2013), American investment banker and founder of the Clay Sanskrit Library
- John Randolph Clay (1808–1885), American diplomat
- Johnnie Clay (1898–1973), Welsh cricketer
- Jon Clay (born 1963), British track and road racing cyclist
- Jonathan Clay (musician), American singer-songwriter
- Joseph Clay (1769–1811), American politician
- Joseph Clay (Georgia soldier) (1741–1804), American military officer and politician from Georgia
- Joseph Clay Jr. (1764–1811), American judge
- Josephine Russell Clay (1835–1920), American horse breeder
- Juanin Clay (1949–1995), American actress
- Judy Clay (1938–2001), American soul and gospel singer

== K ==
- Kaelin Clay (born 1992), American football player
- Keith Clay (1968–2003) of Keith Clay and Shannon Thomas, American duo of murderers
- Ken Clay (born 1954), American baseball pitcher

== L ==
- Lacy Clay (born 1956), American politician
- Landon T. Clay (1926–2017), American businessman
- Laura Clay (1849–1941), American suffragist leader
- Lauren Clay (born 1982), American artist
- Lawrence Clay-Bey (born 1965), American professional boxer
- Lionel Clay (1900–1965), Australian politician
- Liz Clay (born 1995), Australian hurdler
- Lucius D. Clay (1897–1978), American general and military governor
- Lucius D. Clay Jr. (1919–1994), American general

== M ==
- Marcy Clay (died 1665), English thief and highway robber
- Marie Clay (1926–2007), New Zealand researcher
- Marshall Clay, American naval officer and politician from West Virginia
- Mary Barr Clay (1839–1924), American suffragist leader
- Mary Jane Warfield Clay (1815–1900), American abolitionist and suffragist
- Matthew Clay (1754–1815), American lawyer, Continental Army officer and politician
- Matthew Clay (swimmer) (born 1982), English swimmer
- Michael Clay (born 1991), American football coach
- Michael Clay (rower), English rower

== N ==
- Neville Bertie-Clay (1864–1938), British army officer
- Nicholas Clay (1946–2000), English actor
- Noble Clay, American college basketball coach
- Norman Clay (1922–1950), Australian motorcycle speedway rider

== O ==
- Odessa Grady Clay (1917–1994), mother of the boxer Muhammad Ali
- Otis Clay (1942–2016), American R&B and soul singer
- Ozzie Clay (1941–2005), American football player

== P ==
- Paffard Keatinge-Clay (1926–2023), British architect in the United States
- Pauline Spender-Clay (1880–1972), American-English socialite
- Philippe Clay (1927–2007), French singer
- Phillip Clay (born 1946), American housing policy academic

== R ==
- Ramon Clay (born 1975), American sprinter
- Randy Clay (1928–2006), American football player
- Raven Clay (born 1990), American hurdler
- Ray Clay, American announcer
- Robert E. Clay (1875–1961), American educator
- Robyn Clay-Williams, Australian academic and Royal Australian Air Force pilot
- Rosa Clay, later Rosa Lemberg (1875–1959), Finnish American teacher, singer and choral conductor
- Rotha Mary Clay (1878–1961), British historian and social worker
- Roy Clay (1929–2024), American computer scientist and inventor
- Rudy Clay (politician) (1936–2013), American politician
- Rudolph Valentino Clay (born 1943), American boxer Rahaman Ali, brother of Muhammad Ali
- Ruth Murray-Clay, American astrophysicist.

== S ==
- Sam Clay (born 1993), American baseball player
- Shirley Clay (died 1951), American jazz trumpeter
- Sonny Clay (1899–1973), American jazz musician
- Stanley Bennett Clay (born 1950), American actor, writer, director and producer

== T ==
- Tangimoe Clay, New Zealand weaver and textile artist
- Tettje Clay-Jolles (1881–1972), Dutch physicist
- Theresa Clay (1911–1995), English entomologist
- Thomas Clay (1892–1949), English footballer
- Thomas Hart Clay (1803–1871), American diplomat
- Tom Clay (1929–1995), American radio personality and disc jockey
- Tony Clay (born 1991), English actor
- Trevor Clay (1936–1994), English nurse and General Secretary of the Royal College of Nursing

== V ==
- Virginia Clay-Clopton (1825–1915), American political hostess and activist

== W ==
- Walt Clay (1924–2013), American football player
- Wendy Arlene Clay (born 1942), Canadian surgeon general
- William Clay (footballer) (born 1883), Irish association footballer
- Willie Clay (born 1970), American football player
- William Clay (cyclist) (born 1973), American track cyclist
- William Keatinge Clay (1797–1867), English cleric and antiquarian
- Sir William Clay, 1st Baronet (1791–1869), English merchant and politician
- Willie Clay (born 1970), American football player

== Z ==
- Zach Dockar-Clay (born 1995), New Zealand rugby league footballer
- Zachary Clay (born 1995), Canadian artistic gymnast

== See also ==
- Claye (surname)
- Paul Jean Clays
- Claes (surname)
- Clary (surname)
