= William Clay =

William Clay, Willie Clay, Bill Clay, or Billy Clay may refer to:

== Politicians ==
- Bill Clay (William Lacy Clay, Sr., 1931–2025), politician from the state of Missouri
- Lacy Clay (William Lacy Clay, Jr., born 1956), politician from the state of Missouri
- Sir William Clay, 1st Baronet (1791–1869), English merchant and MP for Tower Hamlets

== Sports ==
- William Clay (footballer) (born 1883), footballer
- Willie Clay (born 1970), former American football player
- Billy Clay (born 1944), American football cornerback
- William Clay (cyclist) (born 1973), American track cyclist
- Bill Clay (baseball) (1874–1917), American baseball player

== Others ==
- William Clay (industrialist), early user of the Bessemer process in Liverpool
- William Keatinge Clay (1797–1867), English cleric and antiquary
- Bill Clay, an alias of Hans Gruber, the main antagonist of Die Hard

== See also ==
- William Clay Ford (disambiguation)
- Will Claye (born 1991), American athlete
- Clay (disambiguation)
