= William Foord =

William Foord is the name of:

- William Foord-Kelcey (1854–1922), English barrister, academic and cricketer
- Bill Foord (1924–2015), cricketer
- William Ford (divine) (1559–?), Church of England clergyman

== See also ==
- William Ford (disambiguation)
