= Clay (name) =

Clay is both an English surname, and a masculine given name. It may be short for Clayton.

- Clay (surname)

== People with the given name ==
- Clay Aiken (born 1978), American popular music singer
- Clay Lucas Bryce (born 1999), pseudonym Dream, American YouTuber and Minecraft gamer
- Clay Buchholz (born 1984), Major League Baseball pitcher for the Boston Red Sox
- Clay Calvert American lawyer and academic
- Clay Counts, American politician
- Clay Martin Croker (1962–2016), American voice actor and animator
- Clay Dalrymple (born 1936), former American professional baseball player
- Clay Dreslough, American video game designer
- Clay Felker (1925–2008), American magazine editor and journalist
- Clay Fuller (born 1981), American politician and attorney
- Clay Guida (born 1981), American mixed martial artist
- Clay Hensley (born 1979), American baseball player
- Clay Higgins (born 1961), American politician
- Clay Iles (1942–2026), British tennis player and coach
- Clay Jenkins (born 1964), American politician and lawyer
- Clay S. Jenkinson (born 1955), American Rhodes Scholar and popular historical re-enactor
- Clay Johnston (academic), American neurologist and university administrator
- Clay Johnston (American football) (born 1996), American football player
- Clay Kaytis (born 1973), American animator and director
- Clay Matthews Sr. (1928–2017), American football player
- Clay Matthews Jr. (born 1956), American football player, son of the above
- Clay Matthews III (born 1986), American football player, son of the above
- Clay Middleton (born 1981 or 1982), American politician and military leader
- Clay Riley, American politician
- Clay Milner Russell (born 1999), English actor
- Clay Shaw (1913–1974), charged by Jim Garrison with conspiracy to murder John F. Kennedy
- Clay V. Spear (c. 1914 – 1974), American associate justice of the Idaho Supreme Court
- Clay Spohn (1898–1977) American visual artist, educator
- Clay Sweeting, Bahamian politician
- Clay Travis (born 1979), American sports journalist
- Clay Walker (born 1969), American country music singer
- Clay Webb (born 2000), American football player

== People with the nickname ==
- Clay Cook (born 1978), American guitarist, keyboardist, mandolinist, steel guitarist, and vocalist in Zac Brown Band
- Clay Regazzoni (1939–2006), Swiss racing car driver

== Fictional characters ==
- Clay Bailey, in the American animated television series Xiaolin Showdown
- Clay Davis, in American TV series The Wire
- Clay Jensen, in the novel and Netflix series 13 Reasons Why
- Clay Kaczmarek, from the Assassin's Creed games
- Clay Moorington, a character in Nexo Knights
- Clay Morrow, from American TV series Sons of Anarchy
- Clay Terran, from the game series Ace Attorney: Dual Destinies

== See also ==
- Claye
