= Clay (disambiguation) =

Clay is a material primarily composed of a grouping of clay minerals, and can be used as an art medium.

Clay may also refer to:

== Places ==
=== United States ===
- Clay, Alabama, a city
- Clay, California, a census-designated place
- Clay, Kentucky, a home rule-class city
- Clay, Missouri, an unincorporated community
- Clay, New York, a town
- Clay, Ohio, an unincorporated community
- Clay, Texas, a census-designated place
- Clay, West Virginia, a town
- Clay, Wisconsin, a ghost town
- Clay Center (disambiguation)
- Clay County (disambiguation)
- Clay Township (disambiguation)
- Mount Clay, a peak in New Hampshire

=== Elsewhere ===
- Clay, a townland in County Armagh, Northern Ireland
- Clay, a townland in County Down, Northern Ireland
- Clay, a townland in County Fermanagh, Northern Ireland
- Clay Island, Nunavut, Canada

== People and fictional characters ==
- Clay (name), a list of people and fictional characters with the given name, surname or nickname

== Arts, entertainment, and media ==
=== Films ===
- Clay (1965 film), an Australian film
- Clay (2008 film), based on the novel by David Almond
- Clay (2028 film), an American animated film

=== Literature ===
- Clay (novel), by David Almond
- "Clay" (short story), by James Joyce

=== Music ===
- "Clay", a song by Grace VanderWaal from Perfectly Imperfect
- Clay Records, a record label
- "Clay", a song by Goldfrapp from Tales of Us
- "Clay", a song by Atmosphere
- "Clay", a song by Stand Atlantic from Skinny Dipping

=== Other uses ===
- Clay (musical), a 2008 hip hop musical by Matt Sax
- Modelling clay

== Science and technology ==
- Clay (industrial plasticine)
- Clay Mathematics Institute, a private, non-profit foundation, based in Providence, Rhode Island
- Clay moths, several relatively unrelated species (although most are of family Noctuidae):
  - Cyclophora linearia (clay triple-lines, family Geometridae)
  - Eugnorisma depuncta (plain clay) and several Diarsia and Xestia species (Noctuinae)
  - Mythimna ferrago (the clay, Hadeninae)
  - Paracolax tristalis (clay fan-foot, Herminiinae)

== Other uses ==
- Clay court, a type of tennis court
- Hair clay, a type of hair product
- Medicinal clay
- Clay pigeons, or clays, used in clay pigeon shooting

== See also ==
- Clay City (disambiguation)
- Claye (disambiguation)
- Claysburg (disambiguation)
- Claysville (disambiguation)
- Klay (disambiguation)
