= Richard Clay =

Richard Clay may refer to:

- Dick Clay (Richard Harold 'Dick' Clay, born 1945), Australian rules footballer
- Sir Richard Henry Clay, 7th Baronet (born 1940) of the Clay baronets

== See also ==
- Clay (disambiguation)
