= Mabel Dymond Peel =

English codebreaker (1879–1938)

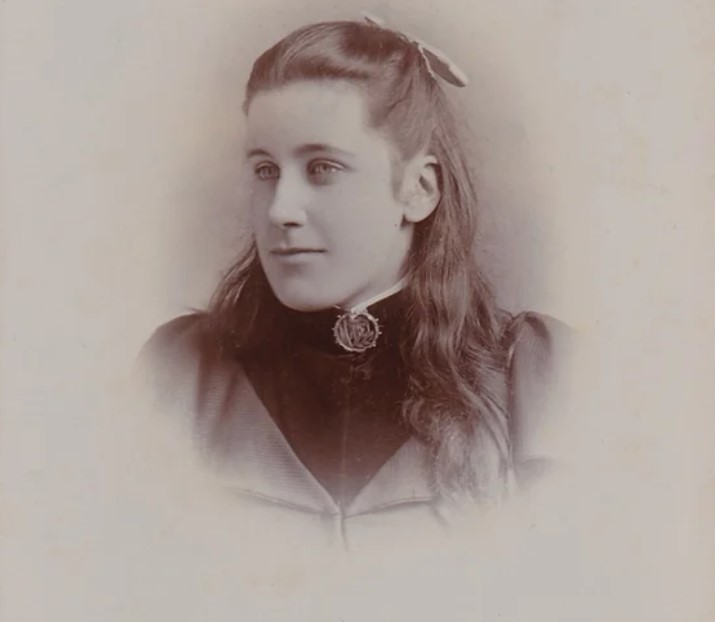

Mabel Dymond Peel (1879 – 1938) was an English codebreaker who served with the Hush WAACs during World War I. She is better-known than her colleagues in this secretive group because of her memoir, The Story of the Hush-WAACs, published in 1921. Outside of wartime she worked as a languages teacher and established the Rouen branch of the Royal British Legion.

== Early life ==
Peel was born 25 July 1879 at Barton upon Irwell, Lancashire to bank official Robert Peel and his wife Alice, née Dymond. In 1898, she worked as a teacher of French and of the violin in the south of France.

She gained a BA in Modern Languages at the Victoria University of Manchester in 1906 and an MA in 1907. She then worked as modern languages mistress at Howell's School, Denbigh and at Bridlington High School, Yorkshire.

== War service ==
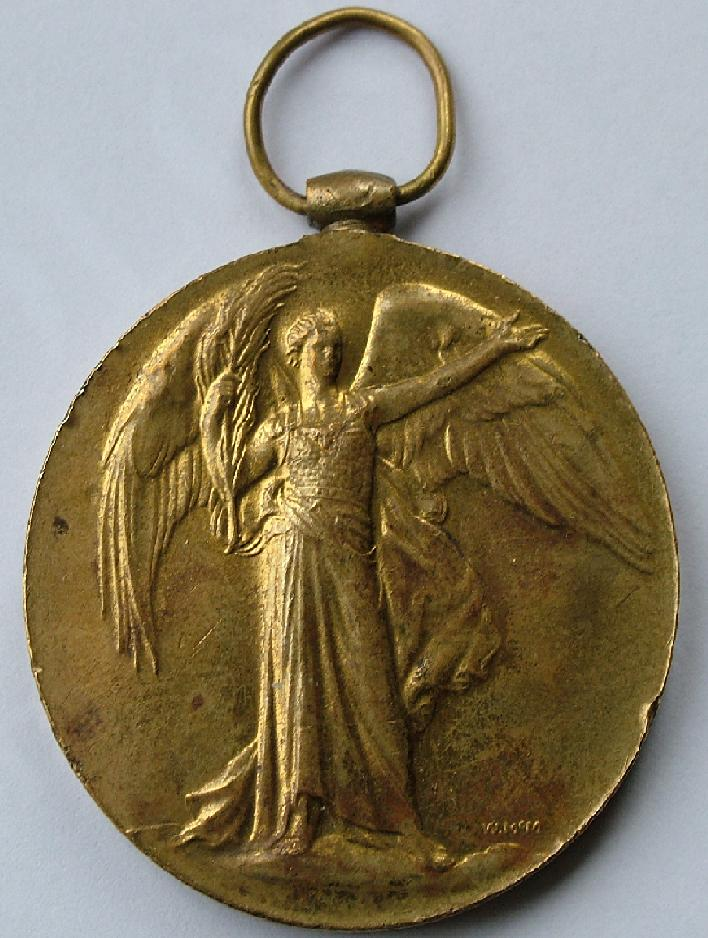
United Kingdom Victory Medal

In June 1917, she joined the Women's Army Auxiliary Corps (WAAC) as a censor in German. Two of her siblings, Alice and Harold, had already joined the war effort as a British Red Cross nurse and an Australian Imperial Force chaplain respectively. Within three months, she was approached by Military Intelligence GHQ, which was seeking women with German language skills to work as codebreakers and free up men to go to the front line.

By September 1917, Peel and her fellow 'Hush WAACs' were stationed at Saint-Omer, France, close to the front line, without having been told what their work was going to be. Peel recalled that the team was discouraged when faced with their first messages, having never seen a coded message before, but soon came to be absorbed by the work. She found the work 'intensely interesting, and as we began to see more and more daylight in it, found it monopolising all our thoughts both waking and sleeping,' and was decoding daily messages independently within three months.

When the office at Saint-Omer was endangered by German advance, Peel and her fellow WAACs moved to a new base at Le Touquet in April 1918. Peel was recalled on 11 December 1918 and demobilised a month later.

Peel was awarded the Victory Medal and the War Medal for her service.

== Post-war life ==
In 1921 she published a memoir, The Story of the Hush-Waacs.

In 1925, she moved to Rouen, France, where she established a branch of the British Legion for the benefit of unemployed British ex-servicemen who had remained there. She ran the branch until she returned to England in 1936, where she worked as a language teacher in Welwyn Garden City.

She died on 25 January 1938.
