= List of Duke Blue Devils men's basketball head coaches =

The following is a list of Duke Blue Devils men's basketball head coaches. The Blue Devils have had 21 coaches in their 110-season history. The team is currently coached by Jon Scheyer.

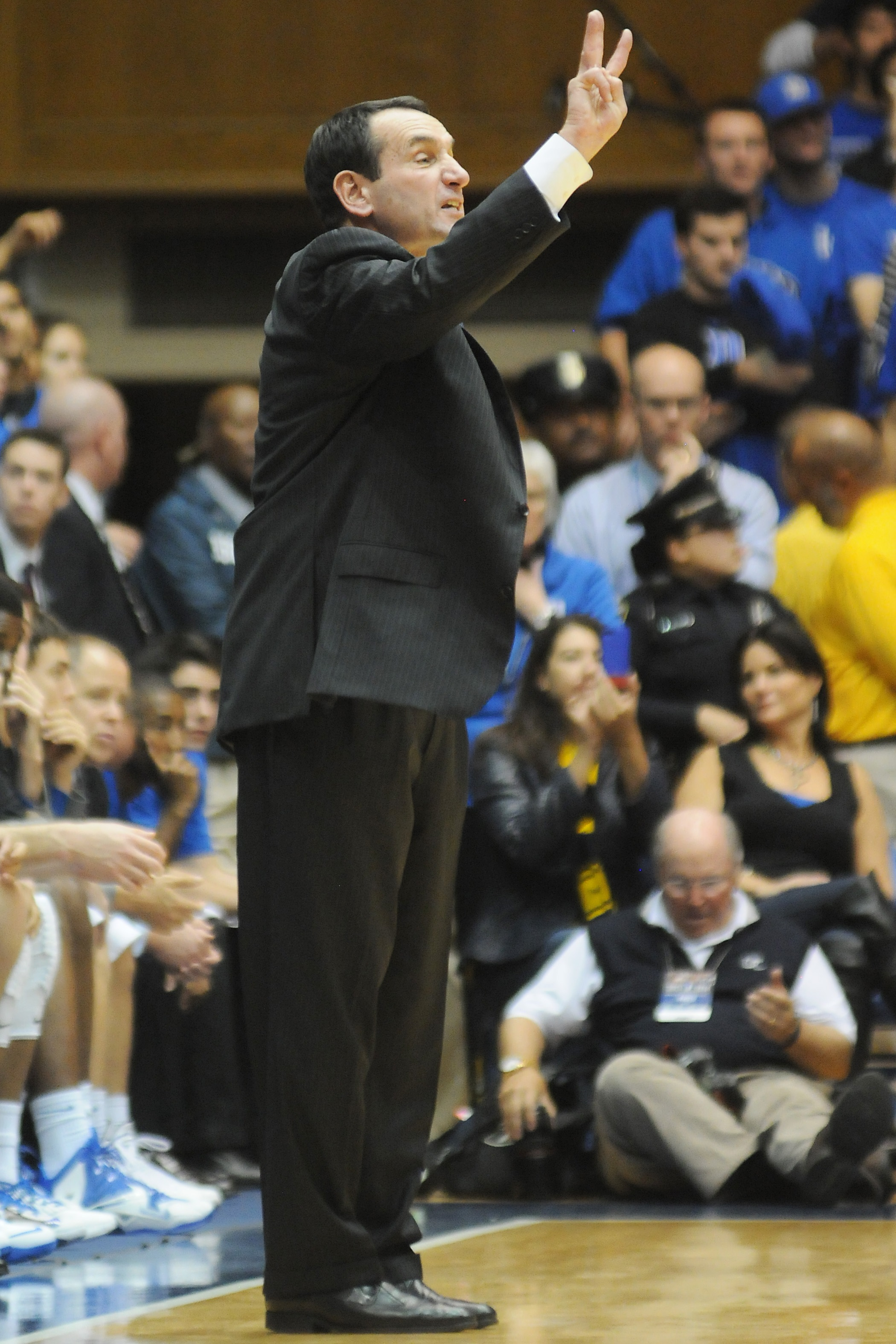
Former head coach Mike Krzyzewski

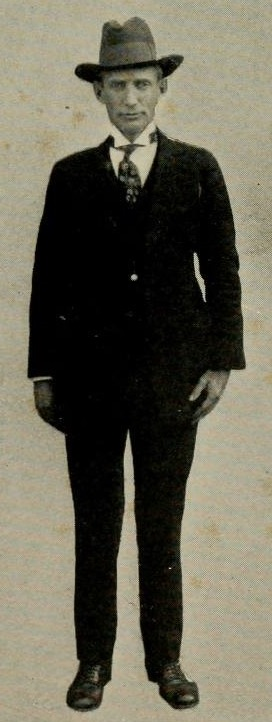
Wilbur Wade Card – Duke's first head coach

Tenure	Coach	Years	Wins	Losses	Pct.
1905–12	Wilbur Wade Card	6	30	17	.638
1912–13	Joseph Brinn	1	11	8	.579
1913–15	Noble Clay	2	22	19	.537
1915–16	Bob Doak	1	9	11	.450
1916–18	Charles Doak	2	30	9	.769
1918–19	Henry Cole	1	6	5	.545
1919–20	Walter Rothensies	1	10	4	.714
1920–21	Floyd Egan	1	9	6	.600
1921–22	James Baldwin	1	6	12	.333
1922–24	Jessie Burbage	2	34	13	.723
1924–28	George Buchheit	4	25	36	.410
1928–42	Eddie Cameron	14	226	99	.695
1942–50	Gerry Gerard	8	131	78	.627
1950–59	Harold Bradley	9	165	78	.679
1960–69	Vic Bubas	10	213	67	.761
1970–73	Bucky Waters	3	63	45	.583
1973–74	Neill McGeachy	1	10	16	.385
1974–80	Bill E. Foster	6	113	64	.638
1980–2022	Mike Krzyzewski	42	1,129	309	.785
1995*	Pete Gaudet	1	4	15	.211
2022–present	Jon Scheyer	4	124	25	.832
Totals	21 coaches	119 seasons	2,357	933	.716

*Denotes interim head coach
