= Claysburg =

Claysburg may refer to:

- Claysburg, Pennsylvania, census-designated place in Pennsylvania, United States
- Claysburg, Ohio, extinct town in Ohio, United States
- Claysburg Air Force Station, closed United States Air Force General Surveillance Radar station

== See also ==
- Clay (disambiguation)
- Claysville (disambiguation)
