= Women cryptanalysts at MI1(b) =

MI1(b) was a department of British Military Intelligence set up during World War I for the interception and cryptanalysis of coded messages. Unlike its equivalent in the Admiralty, Room 40, where women were employed in clerical roles, MI1(b) employed women as linguists, translators, and cryptanalysts. By 1919, a third of MI1(b)’s civilian cryptanalysts and linguists were women.

Most of MI1(b)'s female codebreakers are known to have been university-educated, and several came from teaching backgrounds. Some of them had previously served in the Hush WAACs, a small group of codebreakers working near the front lines in France in 1917–18, and some went on to work at the Government Code and Cypher School, formed in 1919 to continue codebreaking work during peacetime. At least one member, Emily Anderson, also worked as a codebreaker during World War II at Bletchley Park.

At first, recruitment to MI1(b) was done on a basis of personal contact, with women being selected for their knowledge of languages, particularly German. In 1917, the fourteen-strong staff of MI1(b) under the leadership of Malcolm Vivian Hay moved to new premises at Cork Street and its workforce expanded. Recruitment became more formal and Hay introduced his own testing for candidates who applied. Details are limited due to the destruction of records, both accidental and deliberate, pertaining to MI1(b).

== Women known to have worked at MI1(b) ==
Women known to have worked at MI1(b) are (in alphabetical order):

=== Emily Anderson ===
Emily Anderson (1891–1962) was an Irish translator and music historian who was Professor of German at University College Galway when she was called on by the war effort for her language skills. Initially trained for the Hush WAACs, she instead took a post at MI1(b) in July 1918. In 1920, she joined GC&CS at the rank of Junior Assistant along with Florence Hayllar. Head of the Italian Diplomatic Section, she became a trainer of other decoders. Her decoding work continued throughout the 1930s and 1940s, including service at Bletchley Park. She was awarded an OBE in 1943.

=== Miss J.F. Carleton and Miss Chichester ===
Miss J.F. Carleton and Miss Chichester are known to have been working for MI1(b) as linguists or cryptanalysts at the time of its change of premises in 1917. Miss Chichester worked on Uruguayan, Spanish, and Argentine codes. J.F. Carleton worked on American codes, and went on to become a Junior Assistant at GC&CS.

=== Florence Mabel Hannam ===
Florence Mabel Hannam was mentioned in despatches for her service as a Hush WAAC, for which she won the Victory Medal and the British War Medal in 1919. She worked at MI1(b) on non-alphabetical Romanian field codes, and then at GC&CS from 1918 to 1920.

=== Florence Hayllar ===
Florence Hayllar Hayllar (b. 1868) was a professional writer from Brighton. A university graduate, she published poetry collections and a novel as well as articles on social issues. She was editor of the linguistics journal Notes and Queries from 1912 to 1942.

Hayllar served as a Hush WAAC and joined MI1(b) in 1917. While at MI1(b), she composed poetry mocking the sexist attitudes of her male colleagues and expressing a hope that the 'shadowy Entity' of MI1(b) would be lent form by memory one day.

She was appointed Junior Assistant at GC&CS in January 1920 along with Emily Anderson, and left the position after a month.

=== Barbara Freire-Marreco ===
The 'Miss Marreco' known to have worked on Spanish, French, German and South American codes for MI1(b) was probably Barbara Freire-Marreco (1879–1967), an anthropologist known for her fieldwork among the Pueblo peoples. She also worked for the War Trade Intelligence Department during WWI.

=== Alda Milner-Barry ===
Alda Milner-Barry (1893–1938) worked as a translator in the Intelligence Department of the War Office in 1916 after studying Medieval and Modern Languages at Newnham College, Cambridge. After a stint as a German professor, she started work at MI1(b) in 1917. She was deputy to Emily Anderson. After the war she worked as an English lecturer and vice-principal of Newnham College.

=== Claribel Spurling ===
Claribel Spurling (1875–1941) was a headmistress and German teacher at Birkenhead High School when her brother was killed in action in 1917, and she subsequently joined the WRNS. She is known for being the only person to score 100% on a supposedly impossible test set for candidates for the expanded MI1(b) by Major Hay. She worked on German, French, and Italian codes, and went on to work at GC&CS as a Junior Assistant. After her codebreaking career she worked as a warden of several university halls and co-wrote children's stories and drama with Beatrice Clay.

=== Gwendoline Watkins ===
Gwendoline Edith Gwyllyam Watkins (b. 1895) was one of the first six women to be selected as a Hush WAAC for her 'somewhat rusty' knowledge of German, and the youngest of the group at the age of twenty-two. She was mentioned in despatches for her work in France, and was awarded the Victory Medal and the British War Medal in 1919. After nine months working at the War Office at the close of the war, she, like her fellow WAAC Florence Hannam, worked at MI1(b) on Romanian non-alphabetical field codes and at GC&CS, departing in 1920.
