= Claysville (disambiguation) =

Claysville may refer to several places in the United States:

- Claysville, Alabama, an unincorporated community in Marshall County
- Claysville, Indiana, an unincorporated community in Washington County
- Claysville, Harrison County, Kentucky, an unincorporated community
- a former name for Clay, Kentucky, in Webster County
- Claysville, Boone County, Missouri, an unincorporated community
- Claysville, Clay County, Missouri, an unincorporated community
- Claysville, Ohio, an unincorporated community
- Claysville, Pennsylvania, a borough in Washington County
- Claysville, West Virginia, an unincorporated community in Mineral County

== See also ==
- Clay (disambiguation)
- Claysburg (disambiguation)
