= Horniblow =

Horniblow is a surname. Notable people with the surname include:

- Hilda Horniblow (1886–1950), English army officer and teacher
- Dick Horniblow, Australian newspaper publisher
