= Clay Johnston =

Clay Johnston may refer to:

- Clay Johnston (academic), dean of the Dell Medical School at the University of Texas at Austin
- Clay Johnston (American football) (born 1996), American football linebacker
