= Klay =

Klay may refer to:

== Places ==
- Klay, Liberia
- Klay District, one of four districts of Bomi County, Liberia

== People ==
=== People with the given name ===
- Klay Hall, American animation director
- George Klay Kieh (born 1956), Liberian politician
- Klay Thompson (born 1990), American NBA basketball player
- Nathaniel Klay Naplah (born 1974), Liberian football coach and former footballer

=== People with the surname ===
- Nina Kläy (born 1989), Swiss taekwondo practitioner
- Phil Klay, American author
- Robbie Klay (born 1986), South African singer, songwriter, television and theatre stage actor
- Thomas Kläy (born 1961), Swiss curler

== Others ==
- KLAY, AM radio station near Tacoma

== See also ==
- Klaybourne Cheshire, a character in the TV series Chaotic
- María Clara "Klay" Infantes, a character in the TV series Maria Clara at Ibarra
- Clay (disambiguation)
