= Florence Simpson =

Controller-in-Chief Dame Florence Simpson DBE
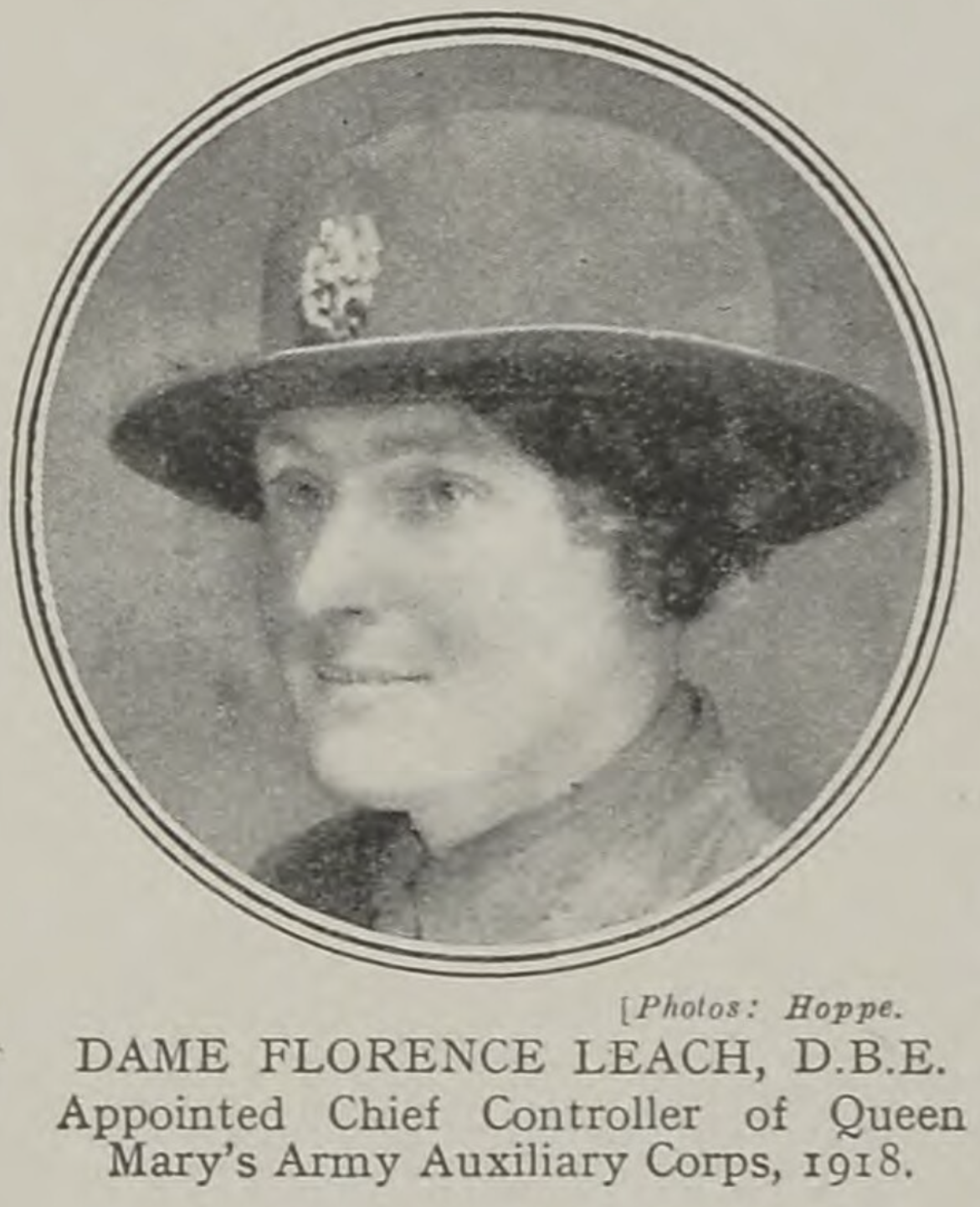
- Born: Florence Edith Victoria Way; 9 October 1874
- Died: 5 September 1956 (aged 81); Arlesheim, Switzerland
- Spouse(s): Brigadier-General Henry Edmund Burleigh Leach (m. 1895; div. 1920) Ernest Percy Simpson (m. 1922; died 1925)
- Children: None
- Relatives: Violet Long (sister)
- Military career
- Known for: First woman to hold equivalent rank of Major-General; first Dame Commander of the Military Division of the Order of the British Empire

Dame Florence Edith Victoria Simpson, DBE (née Way, formerly Leach; 9 October 1874 – 5 September 1956) was the senior female British Army officer during World War I and Controller-in-Chief, later President, of the Queen Mary's Army Auxiliary Corps (formerly the Women's Army Auxiliary Corps).

== Personal life ==
Florence Edith Victoria Way was born on 9 October 1874, the daughter of Colonel Wilfred FitzAlan Way and his wife, Henrietta Mary (née Ross).

She married firstly on 3 December 1895, Captain (later Brigadier-General) Henry Edmund Burleigh Leach. They divorced in 1920. She married secondly, Ernest Percy Simpson, a widower with two daughters, in 1922. There were no children from either marriage. Her second husband died in 1925.

In retirement, Dame Florence lived with her stepdaughters for many years in South Africa. She died at a clinic in Arlesheim, Switzerland on 5 September 1956, aged 81.

== Career ==
=== Women's Legion ===
Her career began in 1915 when she volunteered as a cook in the Women's Legion, an organisation founded by Lady Londonderry to provide "a capable and efficient body of women whose services could be offered to the state to take the place of men needed in the firing line or in other capacities".

She became Commandant of the Military Cookery section of the Legion, taking on more and more catering for the Army. In February 1917 she was appointed Controller of Cooks. On 2 December 1916, she was reported to be visiting Officer's Clubs in France in her capacity as Controller of Cooks.

=== Women's Army Auxiliary Corps (WAAC) ===
Seven months later, she brought all 7,000 Women's Legion cooks and waitresses into the Women's Army Auxiliary Corps, which had been formed earlier that year. Later she was appointed Controller of Recruiting for the WAAC and appointed Commander of the Order of the British Empire (CBE) in 1918.

In February 1918, she became Chief Controller of the WAAC at the War Office and five months later was promoted to Controller-in-Chief with the rank of Major-General, becoming the senior officer of 57,000 women serving at home and overseas. The Corps name was changed to Queen Mary's Army Auxiliary Corps, of which she was elected President.

The Queen Mary's Army Auxiliary Corps Old Comrades Association was established in December 1919 and Florence became the Association's President. The first issue of the Association's Gazette was published in July 1920.

She retired from the QMAAC in 1920.

=== Death of her sister ===
Florence's sister, Violet Long, wife of Major W. E. Long, was one of the Chief Controllers of the WAAC. She drowned while evacuating nurses from the Hospital Transport ship SS Warilda after it was torpedoed by a German U-boat on 3 August 1918. Violet Long was returning from France to give her sister a report on how the WAAC's detailed for service with the American Army overseas were progressing. She was the last woman to leave the ship.

== Masonic affiliation ==
Florence Leach was a member of the Order of Women Freemasons (formerly the Honourable Fraternity of Antient Masonry). The Order of Women Freemasons is the largest female-only Masonic organisation in the United Kingdom, tracing its origins to 1908. Her Masonic affiliation placed her among a network of prominent women who combined military service, philanthropy, and Masonic membership in the early 20th century.

== Honours ==
In 1919, Leach was appointed Dame Commander of the Order of the British Empire (DBE), the first Dame Commander of the Military Division of that order. Her Dame Commander star is preserved in the collection of the National Army Museum.

A portrait photograph of Dame Florence Simpson (formerly Leach) taken in 1918 is also held by the National Army Museum.

== Legacy ==
Leach is remembered as the first woman to hold the rank of Major-General in the British Army and the first Dame Commander of the Military Division of the Order of the British Empire. Her leadership of the Queen Mary's Army Auxiliary Corps helped establish the role of women in the British military, paving the way for the formation of the Auxiliary Territorial Service (ATS) in 1938 and later the Women's Royal Army Corps (WRAC) in 1949.

The November 1925 issue of the Queen Mary's Army Auxiliary Corps Old Comrades Association Gazette featured her portrait on its cover, recognising her ongoing service as President of the Association.

== See also ==
- Queen Mary's Army Auxiliary Corps
- Women's Army Auxiliary Corps
- Helen Gwynne-Vaughan
- Mona Chalmers Watson
- Order of Women Freemasons
