= Hilda Horniblow =

Chief Controller Hilda Horniblow CBE
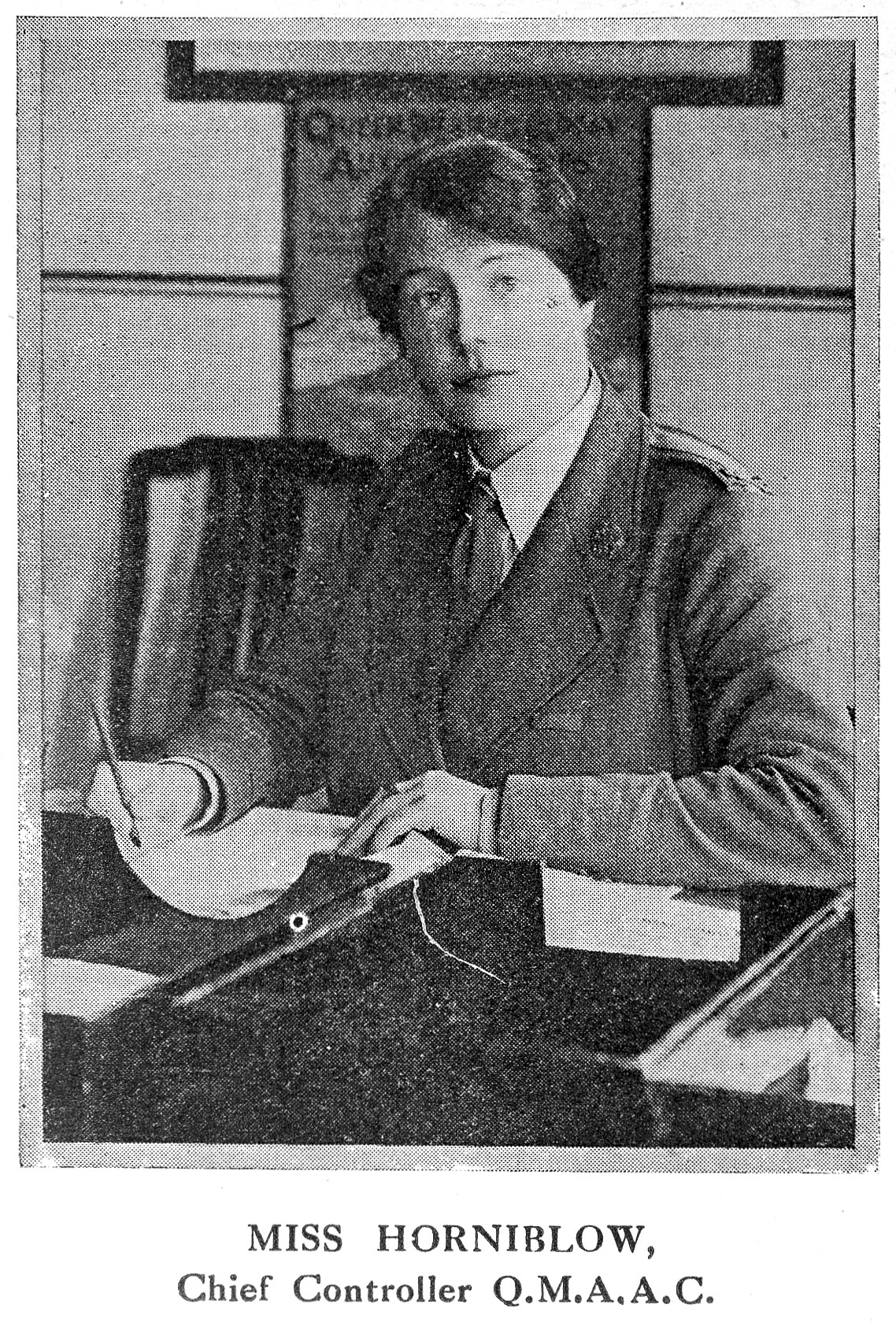
- Portrait from The Times History of the War, 1918
- Born: Emilie Hilda Horniblow; 24 June 1886; Charlbury, Oxfordshire, England
- Died: 2 January 1950 (aged 63) Menston, West Riding of Yorkshire, England

Emilie Hilda Dalton, CBE (née Horniblow; 24 June 1886 – 2 January 1950) was an English army officer and teacher.

She served as chief controller of Queen Mary's Army Auxiliary Corps.

== Biography ==
Emilie Hilda Horniblow was born on 24 June 1886 in Charlbury, Oxfordshire, the daughter of Frederick Thomas and Sarah Ellen (née McCulloch) Horniblow. She was educated at Oxford High School and University College, Reading. She became a teacher in Scarborough but left teaching during the First World War.

She initially joined the Women's Legion, superintending kitchens at a convalescent camp in Eastbourne and running an officers' mess in Kent. She rose to become Deputy Commandant of the Military Cooking Section.

She was then appointed as deputy to Florence Leach, controller of the Women's Army Auxiliary Corps, which was renamed in April 1917 as Queen Mary's Army Auxiliary Corps (QMAAC). She was promoted to chief controller and sent to France, arriving in Le Havre on 9 July 1917.

She eventually had charge of a detachment of 1,000 women attached to the United States Army's record office in Bourges, before being recalled to England in July 1918 to take up the post of chief controller in England on the death of Mrs Long.

After the war Horniblow became headmistress of a women's evening institute in London and in 1935 she was appointed staff inspector for women's subjects in technical institutions.

She married John Dalton (born 1885/1886) in 1941 and retired the following year. She died at her home in Menston, West Riding of Yorkshire, on 2 January 1950, aged 63.

== Honours ==
In the 1918 New Year Honours, Horniblow was appointed Officer of the Order of the British Empire (OBE). She was promoted to Commander of the Order of the British Empire (CBE) in the 1919 Birthday Honours "for valuable services rendered in connection with the War".
