= Women's Auxiliary Service =

Women's Auxiliary Service may refer to:

- Women's Auxiliary Service (Burma), a group of British and Australian women who operated mobile canteens for the troops of Burma Command in World War II
- Women's Auxiliary Service (Poland), a unit of the Polish Armed Forces during World War II
- Women's Auxiliary Service (United Kingdom), a national voluntary organisation in the United Kingdom

== See also ==
- Women's Army Auxiliary Corps (disambiguation)
- Women's Auxiliary Corps (India)
