= Claye (surname) =

Claye is a surname, and may refer to:

- Douglas Berneville-Claye (1917–1975), British Nazi collaborator
- Hugh Claye (1889–1937), British World War I flying ace
- Queen Claye (born 1988), American athlete
- Will Claye (born 1991), American athlete

== See also ==
- Claye (musician)
- Clay (surname)

}
