= Claribel Spurling =

English WWI cryptanalyst and children's writer (1875 – 1941)

Claribel Spurling (1875 – 1941) was an English teacher, children’s writer, and cryptanalyst who worked as a codebreaker with MI1(b) during World War I and with the Government Code and Cypher School. She was the only person to pass an 'impossible' test designed by the head of MI1(b) to check the quality of applicants. In civilian life, she was a schoolteacher and a warden of university halls, and she co-wrote stories and drama for children with Beatrice Clay.

== Early life ==
Spurling was born in 1875 to Reverend Frederick William Spurling, and grew up in Oxford. She was educated at the Oxford High School for Girls and the Society of Oxford Home-Students, achieving second class honours in Modern History in 1899 and graduating as a Master of Arts when degrees were opened to women in 1920. In 1907, when her father was appointed to Chester Cathedral, Claribel took a post as a history teacher at the Queen's School, Chester, and was appointed headmistress of Birkenhead High School in 1916.

== Cryptanalysis ==
During World War I, Claribel intended to travel to Canada, but could not obtain permits to do so. In 1917, her brother, Captain Francis Spurling, was killed in action. Claribel joined the Women's Royal Naval Service that year.

MI1(b), the cryptanalysis department of British Military Intelligence, was already employing women based on personal contact by 1917. When MI1(b) expanded in 1917, its director, Malcolm Vivian Hay, devised a test to quality-check the applicants as the recruitment process for the 'Cork Street Code Breakers' became more formalised. The test, based on a doctored French newspaper article, was described as 'practically impossible'. Claribel Spurling was the only person to get a score of 100% on the test and to be recruited via that pathway. She worked on French, German and Italian codes with MI(b).

The Government Code and Cypher School (GC&CS, later GCHQ) was formed late in 1919 to continue codebreaking work in peacetime. In January 1920, Claribel joined GC&CS as a translator, where she also worked on Italian and Swedish codes. She was appointed a Junior Assistant there within a few months.

== Later life ==
Later in 1920, Spurling worked as the warden of Ellis Lloyd Jones Hall in Manchester. After working towards the establishment of an international club for university women, she became the first warden of Crosby Hall in London, home of the International Federation of University Women, in 1927. She brought her love of drama to both roles, encouraging dramatic performances at social and ceremonial occasions.

She wrote stories and drama for children, including collaborating with Beatrice Clay, her colleague at the Queen's School, on material based on myth and legend.

She died in 1941.
