= Women's Army Auxiliary Corps =

Women's Army Auxiliary Corps may refer to:

- Women's Army Auxiliary Corps (Britain), or Queen Mary's Army Auxiliary Corps, a branch of the British military during World War I
- Women's Army Auxiliary Corps (United States), later the Women's Army Corps, a branch of the U.S. military during World War II
- Women's Auxiliary Army Corps (New Zealand), a branch of the New Zealand military during World War II

== See also ==
- Women's Auxiliary Corps (India)
- Women's Auxiliary Service (disambiguation)
