= William Clay Ford =

William Clay Ford may refer to:

- William Clay Ford Sr. (1925–2014), grandson of Henry Ford, son of Edsel Ford and owner, until his death, of the Detroit Lions
- William Clay Ford Jr. (born 1957), great-grandson of Henry Ford, son of William Clay Ford, Sr., chairman of Ford Motor Company
- SS William Clay Ford, a Great Lakes freighter owned by the Ford Motor Company
- USS Chiwawa (AO-68), a U.S. Navy ship later known as SS William Clay Ford (II)

== See also ==
- William Ford (disambiguation)
