= Claye =

Claye may refer to:

- Claye (musician) (born 1982), UK-based Jamaican reggae musician

== People with the surname ==
- Claye (surname)

== See also ==
- Claye-Souilly, commune in France
- Includes people with first name "Claye"
