= Hush WAACs =

British code-breakers during WW1

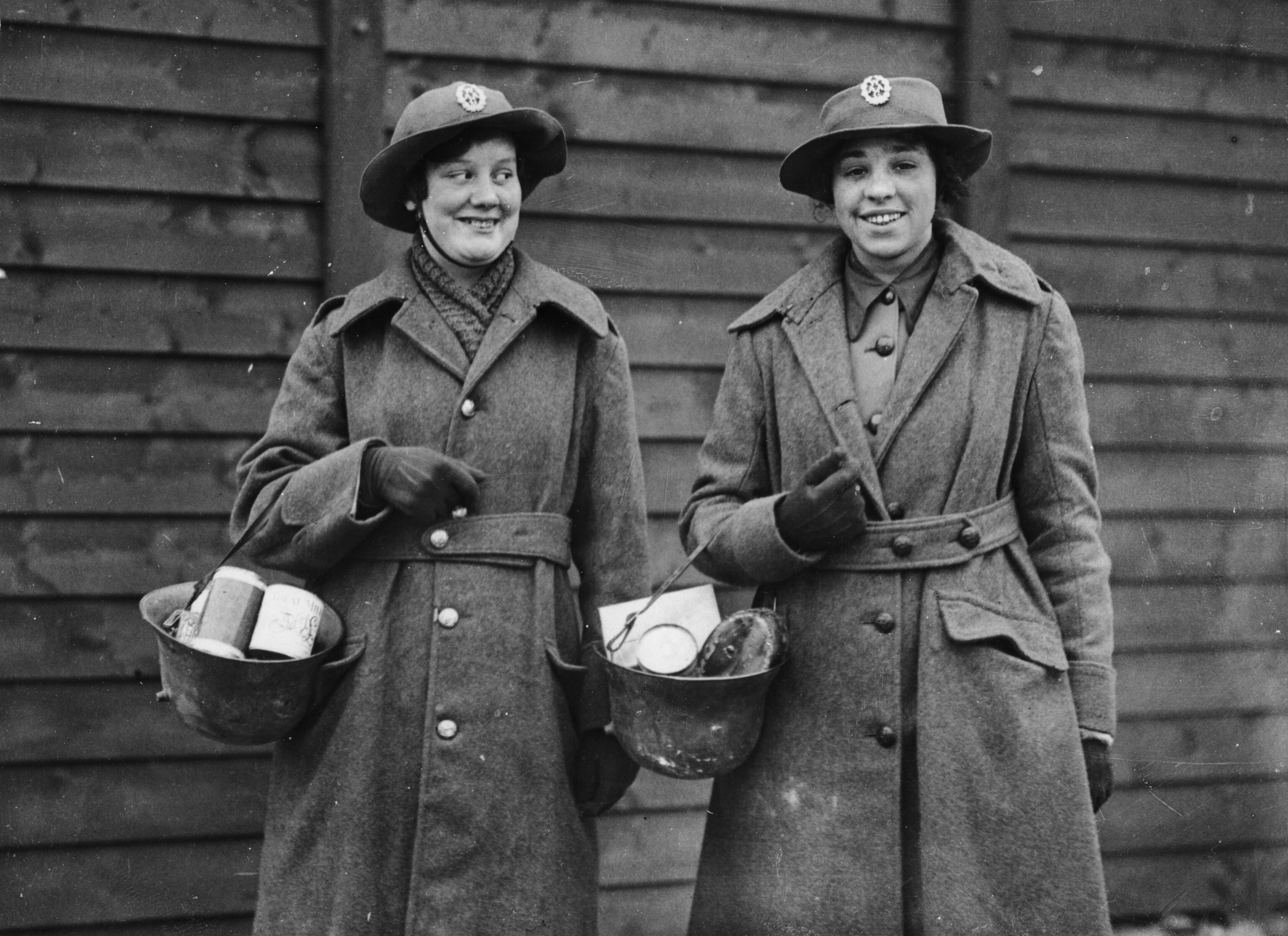

The Hush WAACs were a group of seventeen British women who worked on the front line as codebreakers in France during World War One. After the war, two would go on to work on diplomatic codebreaking for MI1b. Although women were already working as codebreakers in Room 40 and MI1b, the Hush WAACs were the only women to serve as codebreakers at the front line during WW1.

== History ==
In 1917, the British Army in France was short of manpower, and members of the Women's Army Auxiliary Corps were asked to volunteer for front line service in supporting roles. Six women were identified as capable of supporting the I(e)C front line codebreaking work at Saint-Omer in northern France, and arrived there on 28 September 1917. They had not been told what their duties would be.

Over time, these original six women were joined by another three women who found conditions too difficult and returned to England. Between 1917 and the end of the war in November 1918, a total of seventeen women were sent to work in the I(e)C codebreaking team. There were typically around 12 women in the team at any time. They were aged between 22 and 55 years old, and had all volunteered for front line duty. All were middle or upper class, and spoke German.

From September 1917 until April 1918, the codebreaking unit was based at Saint-Omer in northern France. Once the location became unsafe, the unit was pulled back to Paris Plage on the Normandy coast.

The Hush WAACs initially supported the men who were breaking the German codes, by working to decode known systems and build books of known parts of the vocabulary. By December 1917, some of the women were making their own suggestions on possible content of encrypted messages. They would also, on occasion, be in charge of the code-breaking teams.

An officer spoke of the women to the press, calling them "Hush WAACs". A leaked story in the Daily Mail called them "the goddesses of secrets".

== Known members of the Hush WAACs ==
=== The 'Secret Six' (first group of six women sent out in September 1917) ===
- Mary Lilian Caborne née Boord (Unit Administrator)
- Mabel Dymond Peel
- Catherine Hayes Osborne
- Aline Flora Robertson
- Elsie Margaret Thring
- Gwendoline Edith Gwyllyam Watkins (known as Edith)

=== The 'Three Mutineers' (women who returned immediately upon seeing the conditions at Saint-Omer) ===
- K Bale
- Dora Ross

=== Hush WAACS from October 1917 onward ===
- Olivia Margaret Chevallier
- Dorothy Lilian Deighton
- Florence Mabel Hannam (or Hayllar)
- Dorothy Grace Jackson
- Katherine Elizabeth Masters
- Gladys Mary Munby
- Violet Munby
- Nora Margaret Skelton
- Mary Charlotte Tiltman (elder sister of codebreaker John Tiltman)

Codebreaker Emily Anderson was initially trained to be a Hush WAAC but was sent to MI1b in London instead.

== After the war ==
The Hush WAACs were dispersed to other duties after the armistice in November 1918. Many of them were awarded the Victory Medal and British War Medal in 1919 for their work. Florence Hannam and Edith Watkins went to MI1b, and Hannam was transferred to the new Government Code and Cypher School.
