= Marcy Clay =

English thief and highwayrobber

Marcy Clay, alias Jenny Fox (d. 1665), was an English thief and highwayrobber, and subject of the 1665 pamphlet The high-way woman, or, A true and perfect narrative of the wicked life, and deplorable death of Marcy Clay.

== Biography ==
Marcy Clay is believed to have been born in Dorset as Jenny Fox, to parents who were travelling pedlars. She began as a shoplifter in London, working with a gang of thieves and was quite successful. Due to her increasing notoriety in London, she returned to the south-west of England to engage in "country trade", stealing from markets and fairs.

She later took up highway robbery, dressed as a man, at first to pay off a £30 debt. Having discovered how much more lucrative highway robbery was, she continued in this pursuit. She became famous in her time as the subject of an anonymously written pamphlet, recording her crimes and praising her skill with sword and pistol. Clay eventually returned to London to take up shoplifting again, and the pamphlet claimed that she was imprisoned and escaped 4 times.

She was condemned to hang at Tyburn on 12 April 1665 for theft, but avoided execution by poisoning herself on the morning of 11 April with "4 papers of white mercury" in Newgate gaol. During the 12 hours it took for her to die, crowds of spectators reportedly viewed her at her deathbed. She was buried on 14 April near the gallows at Tyburn. As was the custom for deaths by suicide, a stake was driven through her bowels.
