= Claysburg, Ohio =

Extinct town in Preble County, Ohio, U.S.

Coordinates: 39°37′34″N 84°45′35″W

Claysburg is an extinct town in Preble County, in the U.S. state of Ohio.

== History ==
Claysburg was laid out and platted in 1833.
