= Lauren Clay =

American Artist (born 1982)

- Born: 1982 (age 43–44); Brookhaven, Mississippi, U.S.
- Education: Savannah College of Art and Design (BFA); Virginia Commonwealth University (MFA)

Lauren Clay (born 1982) is an American artist who lives and works in Brooklyn, New York. She is known for her large architectural installations and relief sculptures. Her work often contains mythological and historical architectural references In 2019, Clay became a recipient of the Pollock-Krasner Foundation Grant.

== Biography ==
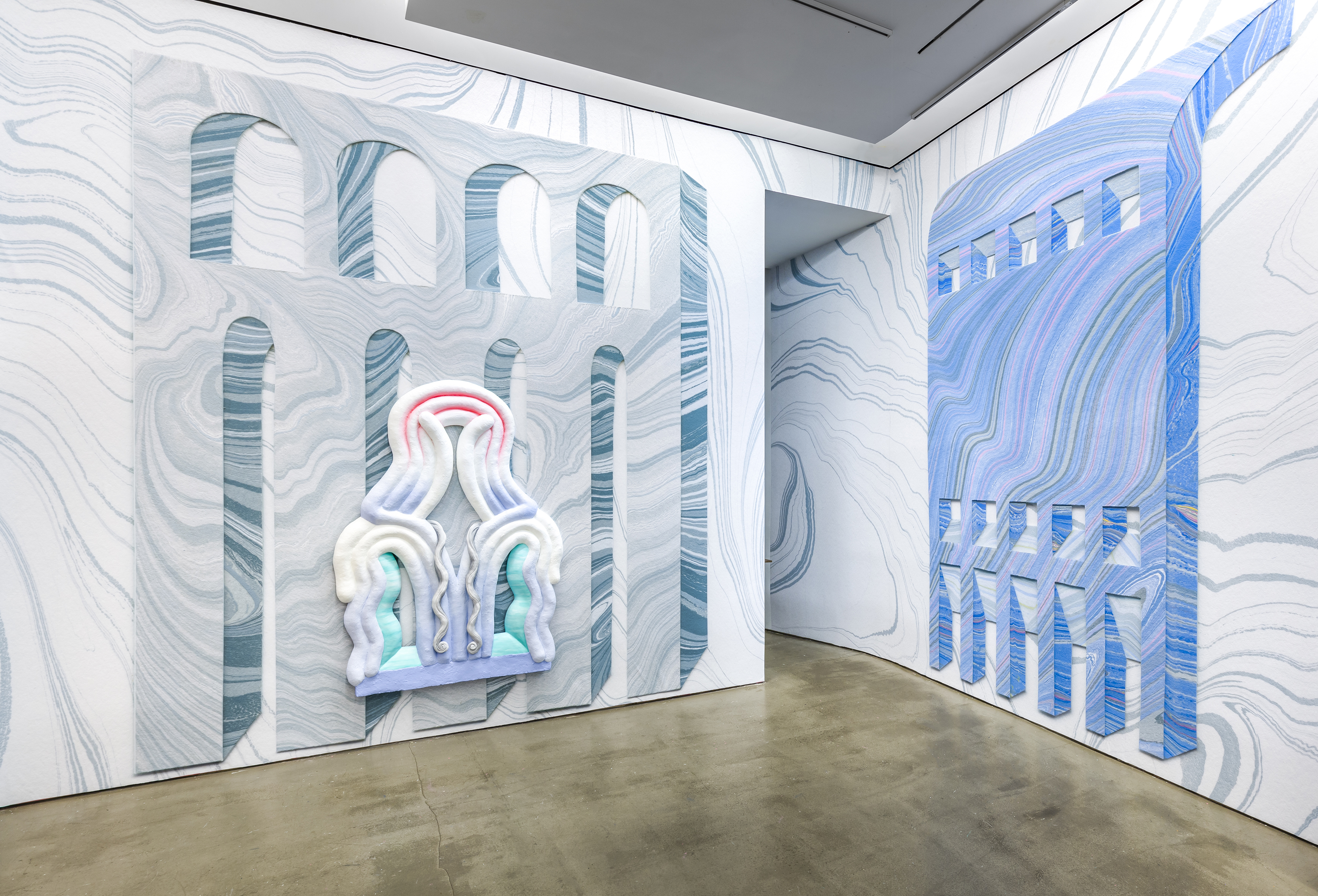
Lauren Clay, installation view, Windows and Walls, 2018

Clay grew up in the suburbs of Atlanta, Georgia. She attended Savannah College of Art and Design where she received a Bachelor of Fine Arts degree in Painting in 2004. Clay received a MFA from Virginia Commonwealth University in Painting and Printmaking in 2007.

== Inspiration ==
Clay explores the realms of dreams, to symbolize the metaphysical connection between dreams to reality and earth and heaven, while also using Jungian Dream Analysis.
