= Tettje Clay-Jolles =

Dutch physicist (1881–1972)

- Other name: Tettja Clasina Jolles
- Education: University of Groningen
- Scientific career
- Fields: Atmospheric radiation, low-temperature physics
- Workplaces: Bandung Institute of Technology

Tettje Clay-Jolles (1881–1972) was one of the first female Dutch physicists. She studied the variation of atmospheric radiation with geographic latitude.

== Early life ==
Clay-Jolles was born in 1881 in Assen, Netherlands to Eva Dina Halbertsma and Maurits Aernout Diedrick Jolles. She was the first and only girl to attend the local secondary school, passing both the alpha and beta series exams at the end of her studies there. These exams tested her knowledge of the humanities and science and she passed both, which was reportedly an unusual occurrence.

== Education ==
After secondary school, Clay-Jolles attended the University of Groningen. She commuted each day from Assen by train until 1903 when she transferred to the University of Leiden. At the University of Leiden, she was one of the few women who studied physics at the university. There she began her doctoral research on low-temperature physics under Heike Kamerlingh Onnes.

== Career ==
After moving to Java, Clay-Jolles returned to research and worked as an assistant in a laboratory researching vacuum pumps. During this time she also edited and typed all of her husband's publications. In recognition of her expertise as a scientist and scholar, she was hired to edit a series of lectures by Nobel laureate Hendrik Antoon Lorentz in 1921.

Clay-Jolles worked with her husband during the 1920s studying cosmic rays, radiation in the ultraviolet solar spectrum, and the intensity of atmospheric radiation. The two discovered that atmospheric radiation depended on geographic latitude. They did this by comparing the ultraviolet light at their location in Java to the ultraviolet light at the Batavia Observatory. Clay-Jones and her husband published an article on these findings in the Proceedings of the Amsterdam Academy of Sciences entitled "Measurements of Ultraviolet Sunlight in the Tropics."

After some dispute over the veracity of these findings, Clay-Jolles defended their work in a discussion published in the East Indian scientific journal, Natuurkundig Tijdshrift voor Nederlandsch-Indië.

== Personal life ==
Clay-Jolles met and fell in love with Jacob Clay, another of Kamerlingh Onnes's students, and in 1908 the two were married. Later that year she left school to focus on her family. She spent the next twelve years raising the couple's three children. In 1920, the family moved to Bandung, Java when Jacob Clay was hired as a professor of physics at the Institute of Technology.

In 1929, the family moved to Amsterdam where Clay-Jones died in 1972.
