= Clay Center =

Clay Center can refer to a community in the United States:

- Clay Center, Kansas
- Clay Center, Nebraska
- Clay Center, Ohio
- Clay Center, West Virginia

It can also refer to an astronomical observatory and learning center at the Dexter School in Brookline, Massachusetts.
