= Clay City =

Clay City may refer to the following places in the United States:

- Clay City, Illinois, a village
- Clay City Township, Clay County, Illinois
- Clay City, Indiana, a town
- Clay City, Spencer County, Indiana, an unincorporated community
- Clay City, Kentucky, a home rule-class city
