= Buddy Clay =

American baseball player

- Second baseman
- Born: March 28, 1894; Pittsburgh, Pennsylvania
- Died: August 18, 1967 (aged 73); Los Angeles, California
- Threw: Right

Negro league baseball debut
- 1921, for the Pittsburgh Keystones

Last appearance
- 1921, for the Pittsburgh Keystones

Teams
- Pittsburgh Keystones (1921)

Wilbron A. Clay Jr. (March 28, 1894 – August 18, 1967), nicknamed "Buddy", was an American Negro league second baseman in the 1920s.

A native of Pittsburgh, Pennsylvania, Clay played for the Pittsburgh Keystones in 1921. He died in Los Angeles, California in 1967 at age 73.
