= William Ford =

Bill or William Ford may refer to:

== Business and industry ==
- William Clay Ford Sr. (1925–2014), youngest of the four children of Edsel Ford and a grandchild of Henry Ford
- William Clay Ford Jr. (born 1957), great-grandson of Henry Ford and executive chairman of Ford Motor Company
- William E. Ford (born 1961), American businessman

== Politics ==
- William Donnison Ford (1779–1833), U.S. representative from New York
- William D. Ford (1927–2004), U.S. representative from Michigan
- Guillermo Ford (1939–2011), known as Billy, vice president of Panama
- William Ford (MP), member of parliament (MP) for Melcombe Regis

== Sports ==
- William Augustus Ford (1818–1873), English cricketer
- William Ford (jockey), British steeplechase rider in 1848 Grand National
- Bill Ford (outfielder) (1880–1962), American Negro league baseball player
- Bill Ford (footballer) (1906–1984), Australian footballer for Richmond and Hawthorn
- Bill Ford (pitcher) (1915–1994), American Major League Baseball pitcher
- Will Ford (born 1986), American football running back

== Others ==
- William Ford (divine) (1559–1616 or after), Church of England clergyman
- William Prince Ford (1803–1866), preacher and farmer in pre – Civil War Louisiana
- William Ford (prospector) (1852–1932), discovered gold in Australia, 1892
- William Justice Ford (1853–1904), English schoolmaster, known as a cricketer and sports writer
- William P. Ford (1936–2008), advocate for the people of El Salvador
- William Henry Ford (1868–1921), South African architect and designer of Australian origin
- Willie Ford (died 2019), American musician, member of The Dramatics

== Other uses ==
- SS William Clay Ford, a Great Lakes freighter owned by the Ford Motor Company
