= Jacob Clay =

Dutch physicist (1882–1955)

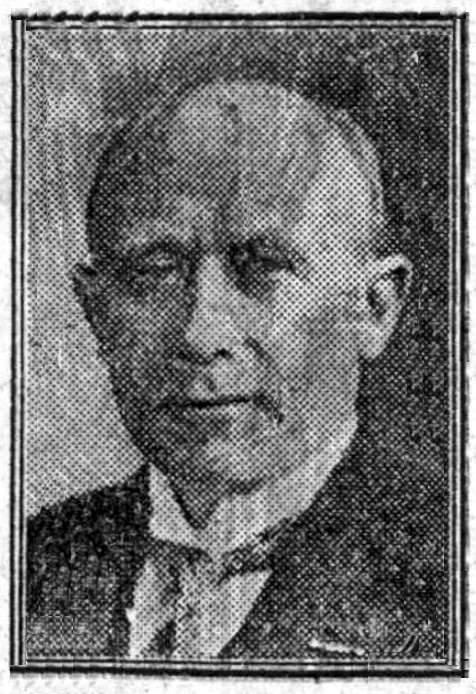
Jacob Clay, 1929

Jacob Clay (Dutch pronunciation: [ˈjaːkɔp ˈklɑi]) (January 18, 1882–December 31, 1955) was a prominent Dutch physicist who first suggested and provided evidence that cosmic rays are charged particles.

== Early life ==
Clay was born "Jacob Claij" in Berkhout on 18 January 1882 as the son of Pieter Claij and Neeltje Molenaar. After attending the Erasmiaans Gymnasium, he studied physics at the University of Leiden under Heike Kamerlingh Onnes and Hendrik Antoon Lorentz. After obtaining his Ph.D. degree in 1908 he married Tettje Clay-Jolles with whom he had a son.

== Career ==
After teaching in Leiden and at the Technische Hogeschool in Delft from 1906 to 1920, he was appointed Professor at the newly founded Bandung Institute of Technology.

Clay collaborated with his wife Tettje Clay-Jolles on research which discovered that atmospheric radiation varies according to geographic latitude.

On a trip back to the Netherlands he measured the cosmic radiation and noticed an increase the further he was from the equator, which suggested to him that cosmic rays are deflected by the geomagnetic field and let him to propose that they are charged particles rather than photons. This proposal was generally accepted by 1932. In 1929 he became professor at the University of Amsterdam, publishing over 200 papers until his retirement in 1952. In 1928 he became correspondent of the Royal Netherlands Academy of Arts and Sciences, he resigned a year later. In 1936 he became a full member. Clay died on 31 December 1955 in De Bilt

== Personal life ==
Clay met and fell in love with Tettje Jolles, a fellow PhD student, and in 1908 the two were married. They had three children. In 1920, the family moved to Bandung, Java when Jacob Clay was hired as a professor of physics at the Institute of Technology.
