= Claysville, Harrison County, Kentucky =

Unincorporated community in Kentucky, United States

Coordinates: 38°31′09″N 84°11′07″W

Claysville is an unincorporated, rural community in Harrison County, Kentucky, United States; which was established by African Americans after the American Civil War ended in 1865. It is located on U.S. Route 62 at the Licking River.

== History ==
The area was originally called "Marysville", and was laid out in 1799 or 1800. A post office called Marysville was established in 1816.

The post office was renamed Claysville in 1825, and remained in operation until it was discontinued in 1917. Claysville was once considered a busy shipping point, but when the railroad was completed in the area and bypassed Claysville, business activity shifted to other nearby towns, and Claysville's population dwindled.
