= William Ford (divine) =

William Ford or Foord (1559 in Bury St Edmunds – in or after 1616) was a Church of England clergyman.

Ford was educated at Trinity College, Cambridge, where he graduated B.A. in 1578. He was elected fellow of Trinity in 1581, proceeded M.A. in 1582, and commenced B.D. in 1591. He has been identified with a William Ford who became Rector of Thurleigh, Bedfordshire, in 1594, and was Vicar of Keysoe in 1596–7. By 1611 he had become chaplain to the Levant Company at Constantinople. On 31 July 1611 he petitioned the court for an augmentation of his salary of two hundred sequins; on the following 1 October the court allowed him an advance from £30 to £50 on the ground of his being 'well spoken of for paines and merits in his charge.' On 1 September 1613 he intimated a wish to resign his post, but was requested to remain a year longer. He received permission to return home, 6 July 1614. He may be the William Ford who became Vicar of Bristow (Bridstow?), Herefordshire in 1615.

== Works ==
Ford's only known publication is A Sermon [on Gen. xxiii. 2-4] preached at Constantinople, in the Vines of Perah, at the Funerall of the vertuous and admired Lady Anne Glover, sometime Wife to the Honourable Knight Sir Thomas Glover, and then Ambassadour ordinary for his Maiesty of Great Britaine, in the Port of the Great Turkey, 4to, London, 1616. In dedicating this discourse to Lady Wentworth the author would perhaps be encouraged, should it prove acceptable to her, 'to second it with some more pleasing and delightful subject, which mine own experience hath gathered from no less painful then farre forraigne obseruations'.

== Sources ==
This article incorporates text from a publication now in the public domain: "Ford, William (fl.1616)". Dictionary of National Biography. London: Smith, Elder & Co. 1885–1900.
