= William Clay (footballer) =

Irish association footballer

Personal information
- Date of birth: 1883
- Place of birth: Belfast, Ireland
- Position: Leftback

Senior career*
Years	Team	Apps	(Gls)
- Belfast Celtic
1903	Sheffield United	7	(0)
- Belfast Celtic
1905	Leeds City	0	(0)
- Derry Celtic
- * Club domestic league appearances and goals

William Clay (born 1883) was an Irish footballer who played in the Football League for Sheffield United and Leeds City.
