= Noble Clay =

American college basketball coach

Coaching career (HC unless noted)

Basketball
- 1913–1915: Trinity

Head coaching record
- Overall: 22–19

Noble L. Clay was an American college basketball coach. He was the men's basketball head coach of the Trinity Blue and White (now the Duke Blue Devils) in 1914 and 1915. Clay also served as the captain of the Durham YMCA team, which sometimes played against Trinity, at that time.

== Head coaching record ==
Record table
Season	Team	Overall	Conference	Standing	Postseason
Trinity Blue and White (Independent) (1913–1915)
1913–14	Trinity	12–9			
1914–15	Trinity	10–10			
Trinity:		22–19			
Total:		22–19			
National champion Postseason invitational champion Conference regular season champion Conference regular season and conference tournament champion Division regular season champion Division regular season and conference tournament champion Conference tournament champion
