= Clay Johnston (academic) =

American medical researcher

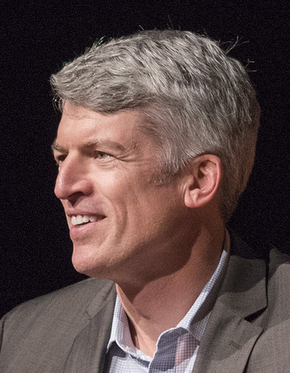
- Born: S. Claiborne Johnston
- Education: University of California, Berkeley (Ph.D., Epidemiology); Harvard Medical School (M.D.)

S. Claiborne "Clay" Johnston is the former Dean of the Dell Medical School and Frank and Charmaine Denius Distinguished Dean's Chair at the University of Texas, Austin, United States. Dell Medical School opened in 2016 with Johnston being named as the inaugural dean in January 2014 In July 2021, Johnston announced that he would step down as the dean of the Dell Medical School. He officially left his position on August 31, 2021.

Johnston received a BS in Physics from Amherst College before studying medicine at Harvard University. He has also received a Ph.D. in epidemiology from the University of California, Berkeley, and practices medicine as a neurologist. Prior to his appointment at Dell Medical School, Johnston served as Vice Chancellor of Research at UCSF.

In 2019, Johnston was elected to the National Academy of Medicine.
