= Beatrice Clay =

British children's author (fl. 1886 – 1925)

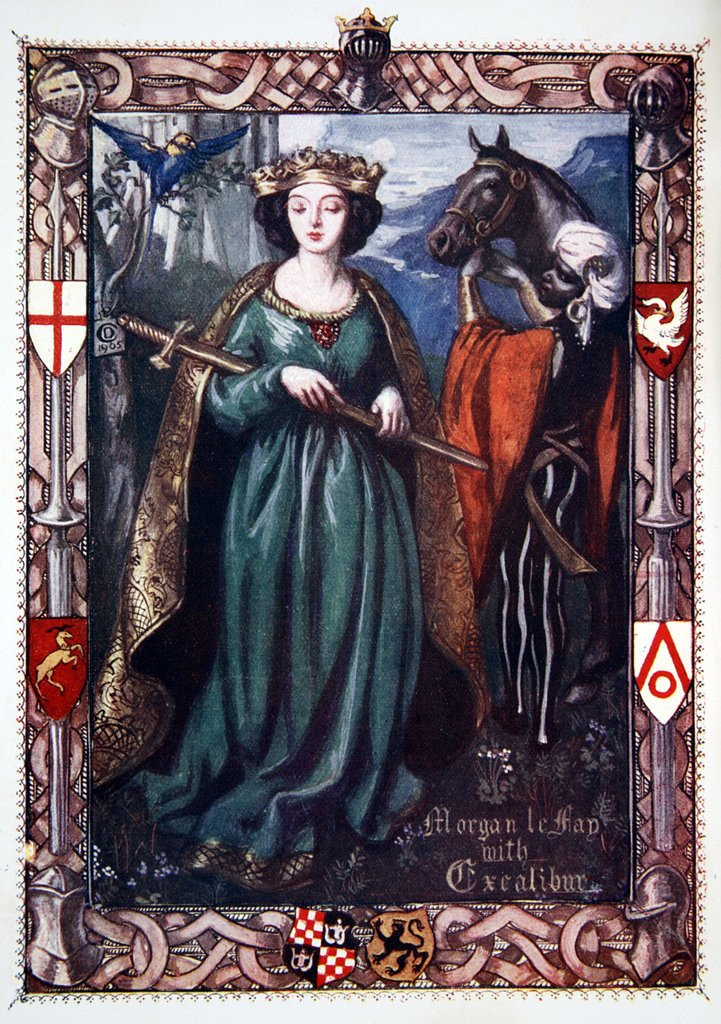
Illustration by Dora Curtis from Beatrice Clay's Stories of King Arthur and the Round Table (1905)

Beatrice Elizabeth Clay (fl. 1886 – 1925) was a British head teacher and children's author known for her retellings of Arthurian and Old Icelandic literature.

== Life ==
Educated at Notting Hill High School, Beatrice gained her BA in English as a Reid Scholar at Bedford College, London in 1886, where she remained an associate. She studied at the University of Cambridge under Eiríkur Magnússon, whom she would later consult on details for her retellings of Icelandic sagas.

She worked as headmistress of Seconder Public School, Penarth. In 1903 she became headmistress of The Queen's School, Chester, where she remained until her retirement in 1925. In both places she was the colleague and friend of Ethel Skeat, a geologist and daughter of professor of Anglo-Saxon W.W. Skeat. Active in Chester's public life, she co-founded a Chester Women's Citizens' Association in 1919.

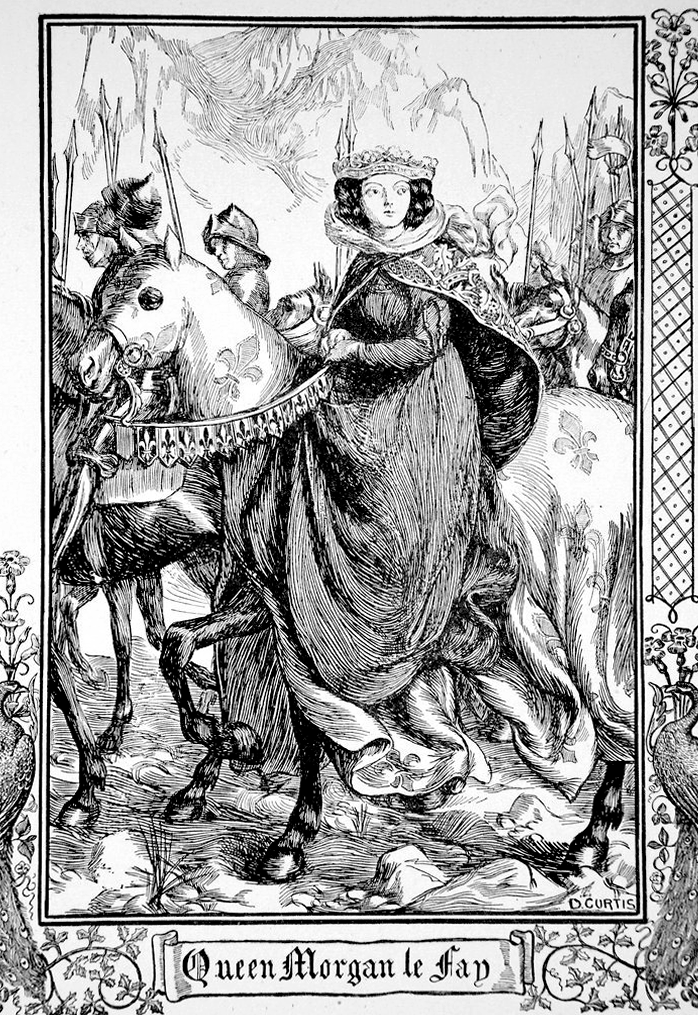
Clay left out the 'somewhat unpleasant character' of Morgan le Fay from the first edition of Stories from Le Morte D'Arthur, but introduced material on her in the second.

Seeking to promote the teaching of Old Icelandic literature in schools, she produced textbooks with excerpts from Longfellow’s poem of King Olaf and from Njáls saga. With Claribel Spurling, she wrote children's stories and drama, including the Chester Historical Pageant and a drama based on Friðþjófs saga. She also produced retellings of Arthurian literature, often smoothing over details to fit with Edwardian morality and render the stories appropriate for children.

== Select works ==
- Stories from Le Morte D'Arthur and the Mabinogion (1901), re-released as Stories of King Arthur and the Round Table (1905)
- (With Claribel Spurling) Frithjof and Ingebjorg: A Tale of the Northland (1911)
- (With Claribel Spurling) The Magic Mirror (1921)
