= Claye (musician) =

Reggae musician (born 1982)

Claye (born 1982) is a reggae artist who lives in South London in the United Kingdom. He was born Clayton Morrison in Kingston, Jamaica, on 9 August 1982. He is a multi-instrumentalist who sings, plays keyboards, guitar and drums. He is signed to the label Roc Nation, has worked with Sean Paul, Michael Patrick Kelly, Gentleman, Ky-Mani Marley and released several solo releases, including four full-length albums: Art & Soul (2016), Perception (2017), Medicine (2020) and Black Magic (2021). Medicine received a favorable review from Reggaeville.com which described it thus: "Slick, inventive production has met ingenious, appealing composition... held together by the man's intuitive, exceptionally pleasing vocal performance".
