= Queen Mary's Army Auxiliary Corps =

Women's branch of British Army in First World War

Queen Mary's Army Auxiliary Corps Women's Army Auxiliary Corps
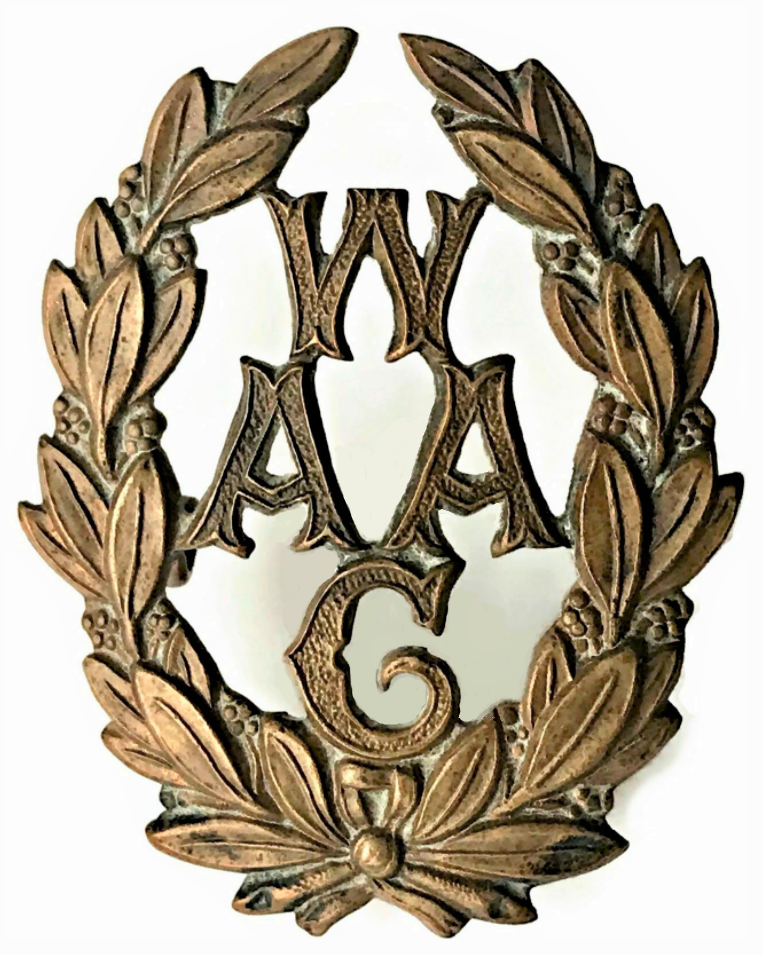
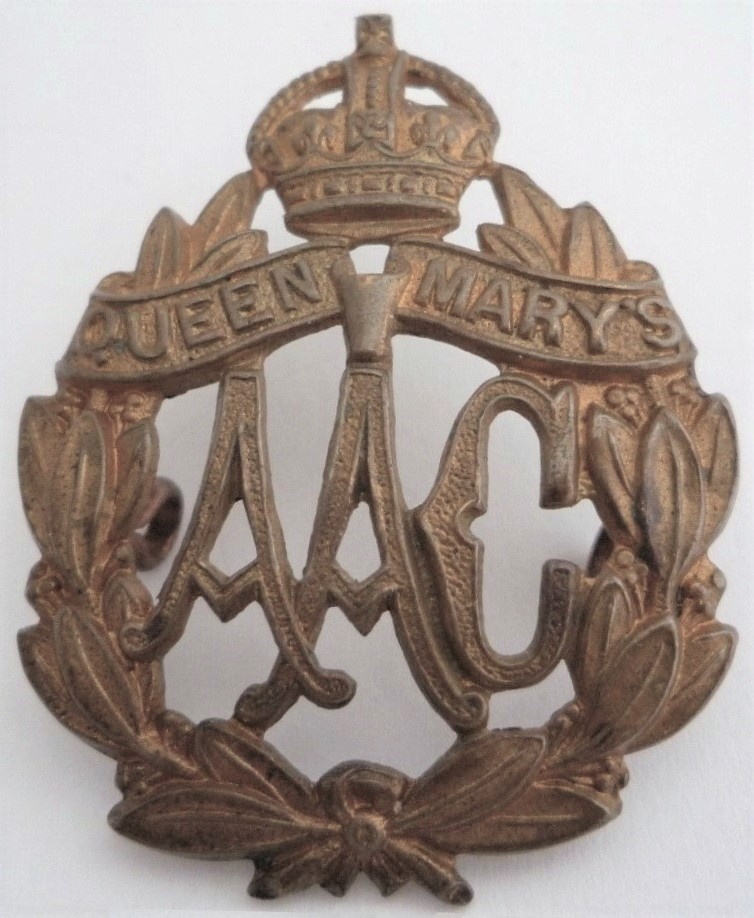
- Cap Badge: WAAC and QMAAC
- Active: March 1917–April 1918: Women's Army Auxiliary Corps; April 1918–Sept 1921: Queen Mary's Army Auxiliary Corps
- Allegiance: United Kingdom
- Branch: British Army
- Type: Women's administrative corps
- Size: 57,000 passed through corps

Commanders
- Ceremonial chief: Queen Mary (Patron)

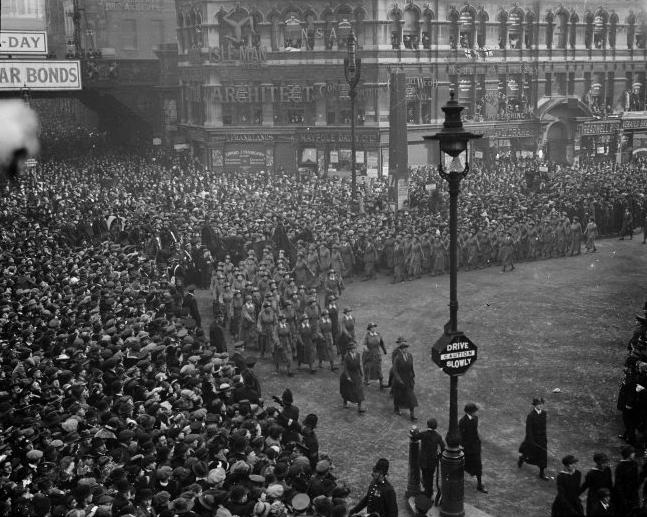
QMAACs marching in London at the end of World War I, 1918

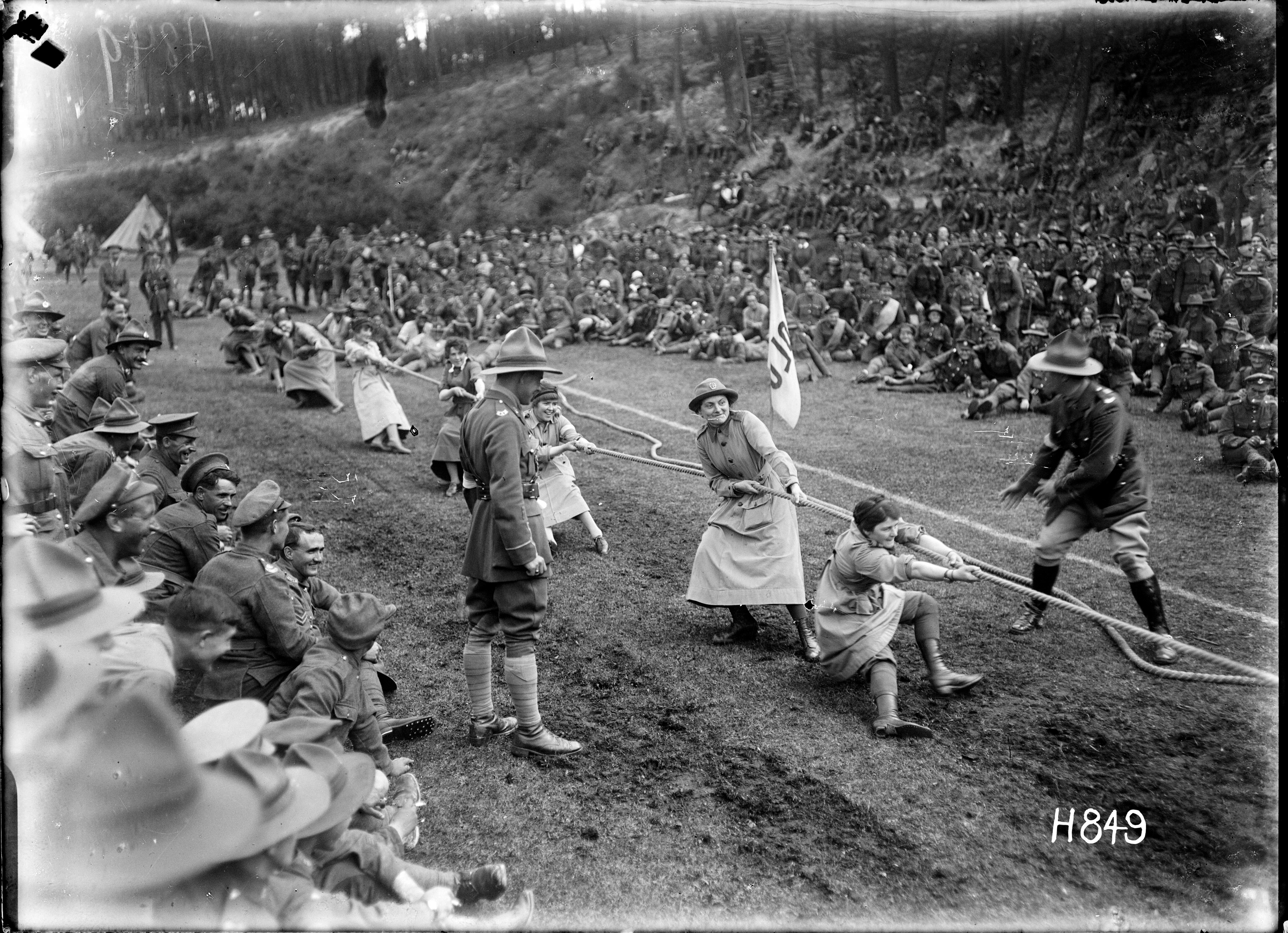
QMAAC tug-o-war team at the New Zealand Infantry and General Base Depot, Etaples, France, August 1918

The Women's Army Auxiliary Corps (WAAC), known as Queen Mary's Army Auxiliary Corps (QMAAC) from 9 April 1918, was the women's corps of the British Army during and immediately after the First World War. It was established in February 1917 and disbanded on 27 September 1921.

== History ==
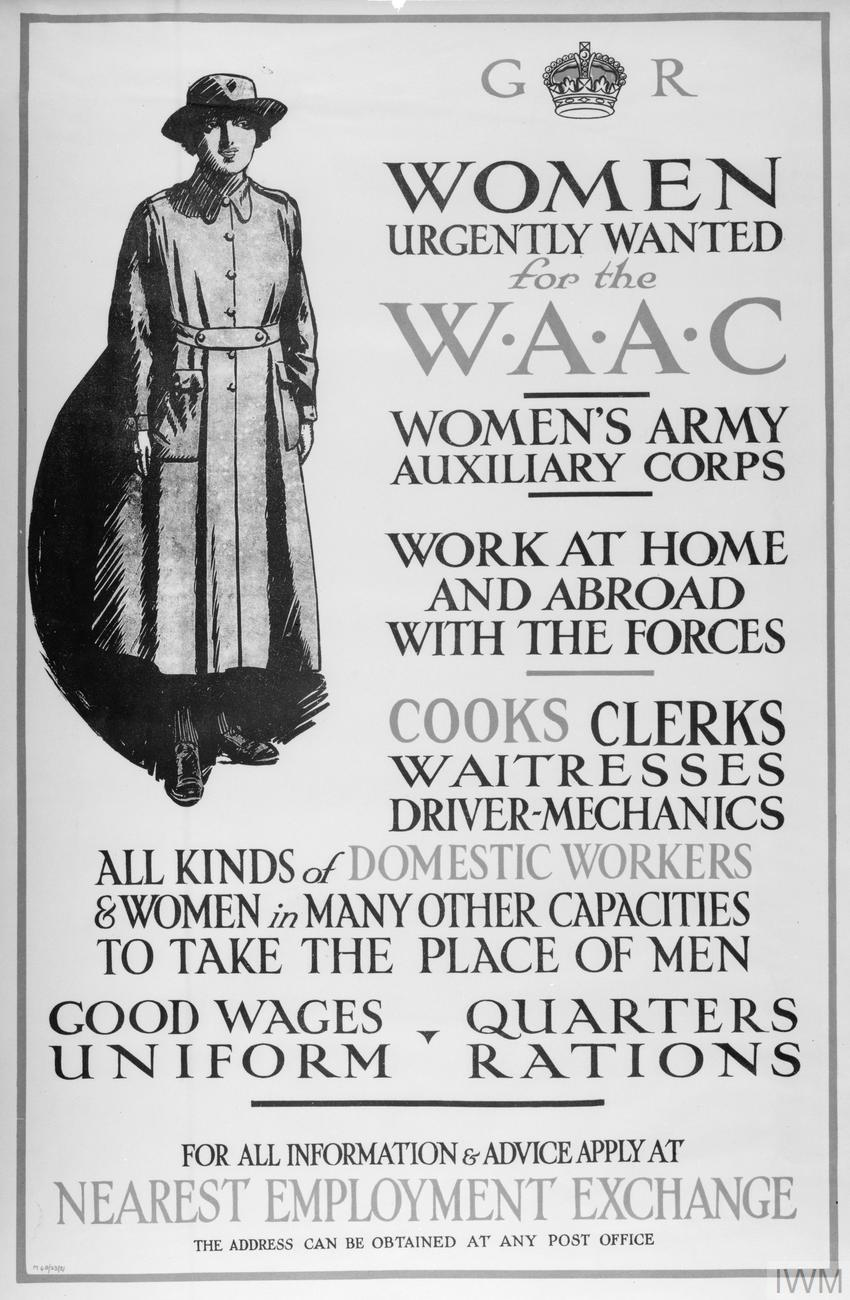
Recruitment poster

The corps was formed following a January 1917 War Office recommendation that women should be employed in non-combatant roles in the British Army in France. While recruiting began in March 1917, the corps was only formally instituted on 7 July 1917 by Lieutenant-General Sir Nevil Macready, the adjutant-general, who appointed Dr Mona Chalmers Watson the first chief controller. More than 57,000 women served between January 1917 and November 1918.

The corps was established to free up men from administrative tasks for service at the front. It was divided into four sections including cookery, mechanical and clerical. Nursing services were administered separately, although an auxiliary corps of the Royal Army Medical Corps was set up to provide medical services for the QMAAC.

On 31 March 1917, women in the WAAC were first sent to the theatre of war in France, at that stage just fourteen cooks and waitresses. Helen Gwynne-Vaughan was the chief controller overseas, and Florence Leach was the controller of the cooks. In 1918, women doctors (attached to the QMAAC) were first posted to France. One such was Dr Phoebe Chapple, who was awarded the Military Medal for tending the wounded regardless of her own safety during an air raid on an WAAC camp near Abbeville in May 1918. In all, five military medals were awarded to members of the QMAAC, all for brave conduct during air raids or shelling in rear areas. Seventeen women were also deployed as "Hush WAACs" with the military intelligence codebreaking team in France.

A total of 17,000 members of the corps served overseas, although never more than 9,000 at one time. In April 1918, nearly 10,000 members employed on Royal Flying Corps air stations, both at home and in France, transferred to the Women's Royal Air Force on the formation of the Royal Air Force.

Demobilisation commenced after the Armistice in November 1918, and the corps was disbanded on 27 September 1921. The last surviving QMAAC veteran was Ivy Campany, who died in 2008.

== Ranks and rank insignia ==
Instead of standard military ranks, a specific grading system was authorised by Army Council Instruction No. 1069, 1917. All insignia was worn on epaulettes except that for forewoman and assistant forewoman, which was worn on the right upper arm.

| | Controllers | | | | | Administrators | | | Forewomen | | Members |
|---|---|---|---|---|---|---|---|---|---|---|---|
| Rank | Chief Controller | Chief Controller (Overseas) | Deputy Chief Controller (Overseas) | Assistant Section Controller | Area Controller | Unit Administrator (i/c large hostel) | Deputy Administrator (i/c small hostel) | Deputy Administrator (2i/c large hostel) | Forewoman | Assistant Forewoman | Member |
| Rank | Chief Controller | Deputy Chief Controller | Section Controller | Assistant Section Controller | Area Controller | Unit Administrator (i/c large hostel) | Deputy Administrator (i/c small hostel) | | Forewoman | Assistant Forewoman | Member |
| Rank | Chief Controller | Deputy Chief Controller | Section Controller | Assistant Section Controller | Area Controller | Unit Administrator (i/c large hostel) | Deputy Administrator (i/c small hostel) | Technical Assistant Controller | Forewoman | Assistant Forewoman | Member |
| Rank | Chief Controller | Deputy Chief Controller | Section Controller | Assistant Section Controller | Area Controller | Unit Administrator (i/c large hostel) | Deputy Administrator (i/c small hostel) | Assistant Administrator | Forewoman | Assistant Forewoman | Member |
| Rank | Chief Controller | Deputy Chief Controller | Section Controller | Assistant Section Controller | Area Controller | Clothing Controller | Quartermistress Class I | Quartermistress Class II | Forewoman | Assistant Forewoman | Member |
| Rank insignia | Double rose | | | | | | | | | | No insignia |

== List of controllers ==
Chief controllers

- Dr Mona Chalmers Watson (February 1917 to 1918)
- Hilda Horniblow (Chief Controller in France in 1917, and in England from July 1918 succeeding Mrs Long.
- Dame Florence Leach (1918 to 1920) (from 1917 Controller-in-Chief)

Controllers

- Helen Gwynne-Vaughan; Controller, later Commandant of the Women's Royal Air Force

== Records ==
Most of the service records were destroyed in a German air raid in September 1940. Those which did have suffered fire and water and mould damage. The National Archives digitised these to prevent further damage and they can be searched and viewed online.

== See also ==
- Women in the First World War
- First Aid Nursing Yeomanry
- Auxiliary Territorial Service
- Mechanised Transport Corps
