= Clayton (name) =

- Gender: Male

Origin
- Language: Old English
- Meaning: Clay settlement

Other names
- Derivatives: Clay, Cleiton

Clayton is both an English surname and a masculine given name. Notable people with the name include:

== Science and academia ==
=== Surname ===
- Anita H. Clayton, American researcher
- Constance Clayton (1933–2023), American educator
- Keith Clayton (1928–2013), English geographer and environmental scientist
- JoAnn Clayton Townsend (1935–2020), formerly JoAnn Clayton, American space policy analyst
- Ruth Clayton (1925–2003), British medical researcher

== Historical ==
=== Surname ===
- Augustin Smith Clayton (1783–1839), jurist and politician from Georgia, USA
- Bertram Tracy Clayton (1862–1918), U.S. congressman and army officer killed in World War I
- Boyce G. Clayton (1929–2020), Justice of the Kentucky Supreme Court
- Christopher Clayton, Royal Navy pilot and admiral
- Christopher Clayton (businessman) (1869–1945), British scientist, industrialist and Conservative politician
- Gilbert Clayton (1875–1929), British Army intelligence officer and colonial administrator
- Hilda Clayton (1991–2013), U.S. Army specialist and war photographer
- Henry Clayton (disambiguation), several people
- Iltyd Nicholl Clayton (1886–1955), British Army officer
- John Clayton (disambiguation), several people
- Joseph Clayton (1868–1943), English freelance journalist and biographer
- Joshua Clayton (1744–1798), physician, governor and U.S. senator from Delaware
- Nathaniel Clayton (1833–1895), British politician
- Pat Clayton (1896–1962), desert explorer
- Powell Clayton (1833–1914), Arkansas Governor, Senator and U.S. Ambassador to Mexico
- Preston C. Clayton (1903–1996), justice of the Supreme Court of Alabama
- Ralph R. Clayton (1922–2006), American politician
- Robert Clayton (disambiguation), several people
- Sarah Clayton (1712–1779), English industrialist
- Thomas Clayton (1777–1854), lawyer and U.S. senator from Delaware
- Thomas J. Clayton (1826–1900), lawyer and judge from Pennsylvania
- Tubby Clayton (1885–1972), Anglican clergyman, army chaplain and founder of Toc H
- Walter F. Clayton (1865–1942), New York politician
- William Clayton (disambiguation), several people

=== Given name ===
- Clayton Cosgrove (born 1969), New Zealand politician
- Clayton D. Potter (1880–1924), Justice of the Supreme Court of Mississippi
- Clayton Yeutter (1930–2017), American politician and Secretary of Agriculture
- Clayton Bartolo (born 1987), Maltese politician

== Cultural and artistic ==
=== Surname ===
- Adam Clayton (born 1960), bassist in U2
- Beth Clayton, American mezzo-soprano
- Bob Clayton (1922–1979), American game show announcer
- Buck Clayton (1911–1991), American jazz trumpeter
- Cameron Clayton (born 1993), American drag queen under the stage name Farrah Moan
- Constance Clayton (1933–2023), American educator and civic leader
- Doctor Clayton (1898–1947), American blues singer
- Ellen Creathorne Clayton (1834–1900), Irish author and artist
- James Clayton (born 1972), Guitarist
- Jamie Clayton (born 1978), American actress and model
- Jan Clayton (1917–1983), American actress
- Jay Clayton (critic) (born 1951), American literary critic and professor
- Jay Clayton (musician) (born 1941), jazz singer
- Klariza Clayton (born 1989), English actress and singer
- Merry Clayton (born 1948), American singer
- Peter Clayton (1927–1991), BBC jazz presenter, jazz critic, and author
- R. Gilbert Clayton (1922–2013), American film set designer and actor
- Willie Clayton (born 1955), American blues singer and songwriter

=== Given name ===
- Clayton Chitty (born 1985), Canadian actor and model
- Clayton Christensen (1952–2020), American academic and business consultant
- Clayton Counts (1973–2016), American musician and composer
- Clayton Hickman (born 1977), British scriptwriter and magazine editor
- Clayton Howard (1934–2017), British make-up artist
- Clayton Moore (1914–1999), American actor best known for playing the Lone Ranger in a television series of the same name
- Clayton Pettet (born 1994 or 1995), British singer and performance artist known professionally as Babymorocco
- Clayton Rohner (born 1957), American film and television actor

== Sport ==
=== Surname ===
- Adam Clayton (footballer) (born 1989), English footballer
- Andrew Clayton (born 1973), English freestyle swimmer
- Custio Clayton (born 1987), Canadian boxer
- Derek Clayton (born 1942), Australian marathon runner
- Jim Clayton (rower) (1911–1992), New Zealand rower
- Jonny Clayton (born 1974), Welsh darts player
- José Clayton (born 1974), Brazilian-Tunisian footballer
- Josh Clayton (born 1996), Australian rules footballer
- Mark Clayton (American football, born 1961), American football player
- Mark Clayton (American football, born 1982), American football player
- Max Clayton (born 1994), English footballer
- Michael Clayton (American football) (born 1982), American football player
- Royce Clayton (born 1970), Major League Baseball player
- Scott Clayton (born 1959), Australian rules footballer
- Tom Clayton (jockey) (c. 1880–1909), Australian jockey
- Travis Clayton (born 2001), English-American football player
- Walter Clayton Jr. (born 2003), American basketball player

=== Given name ===
- Clayton Michel Afonso (born 1988), Brazilian footballer
- Clayton Andrews (born 1997), American professional baseball player
- Clayton Bezerra Leite (born 1987), Brazilian footballer
- Clayton Brackett (born 1993), American wheelchair rugby player
- Clayton da Silveira da Silva (born 1995), Brazilian footballer
- Clayton Donaldson (born 1984), English-Jamaican footballer
- Clayton Fernandes Silva (born 1999), Brazilian footballer
- Clayton Isbell (born 2000), American football player
- Clayton Keller (born 1998), American ice hockey player
- Clayton Kershaw (born 1988), American professional baseball player
- Clayton Lambert (born 1962), West Indian cricketer
- Clayton Murphy (born 1995), American athlete
- Clayton Nascimento Meireles (born 1989), Brazilian footballer
- Clayton Oliver (born 1997), Australian rules footballer
- Clayton Richard (born 1983), American professional baseball player
- Clayton da Rosa Peixoto (born 1991), Brazilian footballer
- Clayton Thorson (born 1995), American football player
- Clayton Tonnemaker (1928–1996), American football player
- Clayton Tune (born 1999), American football player

== Fictional characters ==
- Michael Clayton, title character in the 2007 Oscar-nominated film of the same name
- Clayton Farlow, oil baron in the American television series Dallas

== See also ==
- Justice Clayton (disambiguation)
