= Yes You Can =

Yes You Can may refer to:

- Yes You Can (album) by British singer-songwriter Steve Harley (1992)
- Yes You Can (TV program), a Canadian children's television series (1980–1983)
- "Yes You Can", a song by Emeli Sandé on the album Let's Say for Instance (2022)
- "Yes U Can", a song by Jewel on the album 0304 (2003)
- "Sí se puede", the motto of the United Farm Workers of America since 1972

== See also ==
- Yes We Can (disambiguation)
- Yes I Can (disambiguation)
