= Harold Clayton (disambiguation) =

Harold Clayton (1954–2015) was an American sculptor.

Harold Clayton is also the name of:

- Harold Clayton (Coronation Street), fictional character
- Sir Harold Clayton, 10th Baronet, of Marden (1877–1951), of the Clayton baronets
- Harold Clayton, co-songwriter of "We Can Do It"
- Harold Clayton, participant in Lawn Bowls at the 1970 British Commonwealth Games

== See also ==
- Harry Clayton (disambiguation)
- Clayton (disambiguation)
