= Robert Clayton =

Robert Clayton may refer to:

- Robert Clayton (bishop) (1695–1758), Irish Protestant bishop
- Robert Clayton (City of London MP) (1629–1707), Lord Mayor of London, MP for the City of London and for Bletchingley
- Robert Clayton (cricketer) (1844–1901), Welsh cricketer
- Sir Robert James Clayton (1915–1998), British electronics engineer and executive
- Robert N. Clayton (1930–2017), Canadian-American National Medal of Science laureate
- Robert Clayton (engraver) (c. 1793–?), Irish wood engraver, engraved the first postage stamp of New South Wales
- Rob Clayton, American painter, one of the Clayton Brothers
- Bob Clayton (1922–1979), American game show host
- Bob Clayton (footballer), Australian rules footballer
- Clayton baronets:
  - Sir Robert Clayton, 2nd Baronet, of Adlington (1746–1839)
  - Sir Robert Clayton, 3rd Baronet, of Marden (c. 1740–1799), MP for several seats
  - Sir Robert Alan Clayton-East-Clayton, 9th Baronet Clayton, of Marden (1908–1932)
  - Sir Robert Alan Clayton East-Clayton, 5th Baronet of Hall Place, Maidenhead (1908–1932)
  - Sir Robert Clayton, 13th Baronet of Marden (born 1975)

== See also ==
- Clayton (disambiguation)
