= William Clayton =

William Clayton may refer to:

== Politics ==
=== United Kingdom ===
- William Clayton (Liverpool MP) (died 1715), Member of Parliament for Liverpool, 1698–1708
- Sir William Clayton, 1st Baronet (died 1744), Member of Parliament for Bletchingley, 1715–1744
- William Clayton, 1st Baron Sundon (1671–1752), MP for Woodstock, St Albans, Westminster, Plympton Erle and St Mawes
- William Clayton (died 1783) (c. 1718–1783), MP for Bletchingley, 1745–1761, and Great Marlow, 1761–1783
- Sir William Clayton, 4th Baronet (1762–1834), Member of Parliament for Great Marlow, 1783–1790
- Sir William Clayton, 5th Baronet (1786–1866), Member of Parliament for Great Marlow, 1832–1842

=== United States ===
- William F. Clayton (1923–2017), US politician
- William C. Clayton (1831–1915), American educator, lawyer, politician, and businessperson
- W. H. H. Clayton (1840–1920), American soldier, lawyer, judge in post-Civil War Arkansas and Indian Territory Oklahoma
- William L. Clayton (1880–1966), US assistant secretary of state for economic affairs
- William Clayton (colonist) (1632–1689), acting Governor of the Pennsylvania Colony, 1684–1685
- William Wirt Clayton (1812–1885), judge, director and tax collector in Atlanta, Georgia
- William M. Clayton (1824–?), US politician, mayor of Denver, Colorado, 1868–1869

== Other ==
- William Clayton (Mormon) (1814–1879), Mormon pioneer
- William Clayton (architect) (1823–1877), prominent New Zealand architect
- William Clayton (publisher), publisher of Astounding Stories
- William Cecil Clayton, a character in Edgar Rice Burroughs's Tarzan novels
- William Clayton (Arrowverse), a character in the TV series Arrow
- William Clinton Clayton Jr. (1929–1998), American courier driver and murder victim

== See also ==
- Clayton baronets
- Clayton (disambiguation)
- Clayton (name)
