= Clayton, New York (disambiguation) =

The term Clayton, New York could refer to either of two locations on St. Lawrence River:

- Clayton (town), New York
- Clayton (village), New York

== See also ==
- Clayton (disambiguation)
