= You Can Do It (disambiguation) =

"You Can Do It" is a single by Ice Cube.

You Can Do It may also refer to:

- "You can do it", a catchphrase trademarked by fitness personality Tony Little
- "You can do it!", a catchphrase used by actor Rob Schneider
- "You can do it", song of American R&B band Al Hudson & the Partners
- "You Can Do It" (No Doubt song)
- "You Can Do It", song by Linda Clifford from the album Linda

== See also ==
- We Can Do It (disambiguation)
- You Can Do That
- You Do It
