= Arthur Clayton =

Arthur Clayton may refer to:

- Sir Arthur Harold Clayton, 11th Baronet, of Marden (1903–1985) of the Clayton baronets
- Arthur Clayton (actor) (1902–1955), British film actor

== See also ==
- Clayton (disambiguation)
