= Claydon =

Claydon (meaning 'Clay Hill') is a place name in:

== England ==
- Claydon, Oxfordshire
- Claydon, Suffolk
- Claydon (deanery), Buckinghamshire
- Claydon House, Buckinghamshire, originally home of the Verney family (relatives of Florence Nightingale) and now in the care of the National Trust
- Botolph Claydon, Buckinghamshire
- East Claydon, Buckinghamshire
- Middle Claydon, Buckinghamshire
- Steeple Claydon, Buckinghamshire
- Claydon with Clattercot, civil parish in Oxfordshire
- Claydon railway station (Buckinghamshire)
- Claydon railway station (Suffolk)

== Other ==
- Claydon (surname), English surname
- Claydon, Saskatchewan, Canada
- Claydon Peak, Antarctica

== Related ==
- Claydon Map of the course of the river beside Claydon House

== See also ==
- Clayton (disambiguation)
