= Clayton Brothers (disambiguation) =

The Clayton Brothers or Clayton Bros., may refer to:

- The Clayton Brothers, a U.S. jazz band formed by brothers Jeff and John
- Clayton Brothers, U.S. artists brothers Rob and Christian
- "Clayton Bros.", the former name of the beverage Claytons

== See also ==
- Clayton (disambiguation)
