= Meireles =

Meireles is a Portuguese-language surname and may refer to:

Footballers

- Clayton Nascimento Meireles (born 1989), Brazilian footballer, plays for Avaí Futebol Clube
- Flávio Meireles (born 1976), a Portuguese football defensive midfielder
- Hendrich Miller Meireles Bernardo (born 1986), a Brazilian attacking midfielder
- Raul Meireles (born 1983), a Portuguese football midfielder

Other

- Cecília Meireles (1901-1964), a Brazilian poet
- Cildo Meireles (born 1948), a Brazilian conceptual artist
- Isa Meireles (?-2008), a Portuguese journalist, reporter and writer
- Manuel Quintão Meireles (1880-1957), a Portuguese Navy officer and politician

== See also ==
- Meirelles
