= Steve Banks =

Steve Banks may refer to:

- Steve Banks (footballer) (born 1972), English football player and coach
- Steve Banks (photographer) (born 1938), American photographer, artist and director

== See also ==
- Steven Banks (born 1954), American musician, comedian, actor and writer
