= Cleiton =

Cleiton is a Brazilian variant of the name Clayton. Notable people with that name include:

- Cleiton Abrão (born 1989), middle-distance runner
- Cleiton (footballer, born 1978), born Cleiton Mendes dos Santos, Brazilian football midfielder
- Cleiton (footballer, born 1979), born Cleiton Oliveira Pinto, Brazilian football midfielder
- Cleiton (footballer, born April 1986), born José Cleiton Ferreira Júnior, Brazilian football striker
- Cleiton (footballer, born December 1986), born Cleiton de Oliveira Velasques, Brazilian football midfielder
- Cleiton (footballer, born 1997), born Cleiton Schwengber, Brazilian football goalkeeper
- Cleiton (footballer, born 2003), born Cleiton Santana dos Santos, Brazilian football defender
- Cleiton Conceição (born 1978), Brazilian boxer
- Cleiton Kanu (born 1985), born Cleiton Januário Franco, Brazilian football striker
- Cleiton Sia, Brazilian singer
- Cleiton Silva (born 1987), born Cleiton Augusto Oliveira Silva, Brazilian football striker
- Cleiton Xavier (born 1983), Brazilian football attacking midfielder
- Maycon Cleiton de Paula Azevedo (born 1998), Brazilian footballer

== See also ==
- Cleyton (disambiguation)
