= Yes We Can =

Yes We Can may refer to:

== Politics ==
- "Yes We Can" (slogan), a slogan used by the 2008 Barack Obama presidential campaign
- "Yes We Can" 2008 Barack Obama presidential campaign art by Antar Dayal
  - "Obama (Yes We Can)", a 2008 campaign song by Andy Fraser

== Music ==
- Yes We Can, a 1970 album by Lee Dorsey
- Yes We Can (album), a 2010 album by World Saxophone Quartet
- "Yes We Can" (Lee Dorsey song), 1970 song written by Allen Toussaint
- "Yes We Can" (Made in Mexico song), 2008
- "Yes We Can" (will.i.am song), 2008
- "Yes We Can", a 2014 song by Oscar Zia

== Television ==
- Yes We Can! (TV series), a Singaporean TV series
- "Yes we can!", a refrain by characters on Bob the Builder

== See also ==
- Catalonia Yes we Can, a left-wing coalition in the 2015 Catalonia elections
- Sí se puede ("Yes, you can" or "Yes, it can" in English), the motto of United Farm Workers
- Yes I Can (disambiguation)
- "Yes We Can Can", a 1973 song written by Allen Toussaint
- "Yes We Can Win the Best for Scotland", the Scottish National Party's 1997 United Kingdom general election manifesto
- We Can Do It (disambiguation)
