= Harry Clayton =

Harry Clayton may refer to:

- Harry Clayton (Archie Comics), a character in Archie Comics
- Harry Clayton (footballer) (1904–?), English footballer
- Harry Clayton (politician) (1889–1946), member of the Queensland Legislative Assembly
- Detective Inspector (DI), Harry Clayton, main character in Sky 1 drama Stan Lee's Lucky Man
- Harry Clayton (Coronation Street), a character in the British soap opera Coronation Street

== See also ==
- Harold Clayton (disambiguation)
- Henry Clayton (disambiguation)
- Clayton (disambiguation)
