= James Clayton =

James or Jim Clayton may refer to:

- James Clayton (priest) (died 1588), English Roman Catholic priest
- James Clayton (engineer) (1870s–1946), British railway locomotive engineer
- Gordon Clayton (footballer, born 1910) (James Gordon Thomas Clayton), English footballer
- Jim Clayton (rower) (1911–1992), New Zealand rower
- Jim Clayton (businessman) (born 1934), American entrepreneur who founded Clayton Homes
- Jim Clayton (musician) (born 1967), Canadian jazz musician
- James Clayton (baritone), Australian baritone, see 12th Helpmann Awards
- Clayton Chitty, a.k.a. Clayton James, Canadian actor and model
