= Cleyton =

Cleyton is a name. People with that name include:

- Boka (footballer) (born 1988), Brazilian football forward, full name Cleyton Coelho dos Santos
- Cleyton Amaral (born 1989), Brazilian football midfielder, full name Cleyton da Silva Reis
- Cleyton (footballer, born 1983), Brazilian-Greek football midfielder, full name Cleyton Alexandre Henrique Silva
- Cleyton (footballer, born 1984), Brazilian football forward, full name Cleyton Campos de Melo
- Cleyton (footballer, born 1990), Brazilian football midfielder, full name Cleyton Rafael Lima da Silva

== See also ==
- Clayton (disambiguation)
- Cleiton (disambiguation)
