= We Can Do It (disambiguation) =

"We Can Do It!" is a World War II inspirational artwork by J. Howard Miller.

We Can Do It may also refer to:

- We Can Do It (album), by the Rubettes, 1975
- "We Can Do It" (Carboo song), 2000
- "We Can Do It" (Liverpool F.C. song), 1977
- "We Can Do It" (September song), 2003
- "Kaya Natin Ito!" or "We Can Do It!", a charity single to benefit Philippine typhoon victims, 2009
- "We Can Do It", a song by Jamiroquai from Automaton, 2017
- "We Can Do It", a song from the musical The Producers, 2001
- "Wir schaffen das", a 2015 statement by German chancellor Angela Merkel

== See also ==
- Yes We Can (disambiguation)
