= Change Is Now: Renewing America's Promise =

Change is Now: Renewing America's Promise

Compilation album by Various artists
- Released: April 28, 2009 (US)
- Genre: Various
- Label: Hidden Beach

Professional ratings
Review scores
Source	Rating
Philadelphia Daily News	(A−)

Change is Now: Renewing America's Promise is a compilation album released on April 28, 2009 through Hidden Beach Recordings in conjunction with the Presidential Inaugural Committee. The album includes previously released tracks from Wilco, Stevie Wonder, Death Cab for Cutie, and Common. An accompanying DVD features eight speeches by Barack Obama, starting with the campaign announcement in Springfield, Illinois and ending with the election night victory speech in Chicago. The album sold retail online and at inaugural events in Washington.

== Track listing ==
1. "It's a New Day"* – will.i.am (4:00)
2. "The Dream is Real" – The Tony Rich Project (3:44)
3. "All About the Love Again"* – Stevie Wonder (5:34)
4. "Can't Stop" – Ozomatli (2:55)
5. "Peace Be Upon Us" – Sheryl Crow (4:22)
6. "There's Hope" – India.Arie (3:53)
7. "God is in the People"* – Melissa Etheridge (2:04)
8. "Change" – Lenny Kravitz (5:32)
9. "Dreamworld" – Robin Thicke (4:34)
10. "Pure Imagination" (2009 Version)* – Maroon 5 (4:29)
11. "Hush"* – Usher (3:17)
12. "Born for This" – BeBe Winans (5:26)
13. "What Light – Wilco (3:34)
14. "Shed a Little Light" – James Taylor (3:51)
15. "The Star-Spangled Banner" – Jennifer Hudson (3:08)
16. "Eternity "(David Foster Live Strings Mix)* – Lionel Richie (4:55)
17. "Grapevine Fires" – Death Cab for Cutie (4:08)
18. "Changes" – Common (4:00)

Songs with an asterisk (*) indicates the presence of excerpts from Barack Obama speeches.

iTunes bonus tracks

- "All About the Love Again" (New Mix) – Stevie Wonder (4:02)
- "All About the Love Again" (video) – Stevie Wonder (3:55)

=== DVD track listing ===
1. "Announcement for President" – February 10, 2007 in Springfield, Illinois
2. "Iowa Jefferson Jackson Dinner" – November 10, 2007 in Des Moines, Iowa
3. "Iowa Caucus Victory Speech" – January 3, 2008 in Des Moines, Iowa
4. "New Hampshire Primary Speech" – January 8, 2008 in Nashua, New Hampshire
5. "A More Perfect Union" – March 18, 2008 in Philadelphia, Pennsylvania
6. "A World That Stands As One" – July 24, 2008 in Berlin, Germany
7. "The American Promise" – August 28, 2008 in Denver, Colorado
8. "Election Night Victory Speech" – November 4, 2008 in Chicago, Illinois

== Personnel ==
- John Aguto – assistant engineer
- Ahmed AlHirmi – oud
- Abdulla AlKhalifa – arranger, producer
- Brett Allen – guitar technician
- Paul Arbogast – trombone
- India.Arie – producer
- Jeff B. – keyboards
- Bernie Barlow – backing vocals
- Davis A. Barnett – viola
- Courtney Blooding – project coordinator
- Bill Bottrell – synthesizer, marimba
- Doyle Bramhall II – electric guitar
- Mark Browne – bass
- Andre Burch – engineer
- Branden Burch – keyboards, producer, drum programming, mixing
- Cedric Caldwell – producer
- Jesse Carmichael – keyboards
- Clifford Carter – synthesizer, synthesizer programming
- Dru Castro – engineer
- Ray Chew – arranger, conductor, producer
- Eliza Cho – violin
- James J. Cooper III – cello
- Sheryl Crow – acoustic guitar, vocals
- Vidal Davis – producer, vocal producer
- Kevin Dean – assistant engineer
- Pilar Diaz – backing vocals, musician
- Patrick Dillett – assistant engineer
- Vincent Dilorenzo – engineer, mixing
- Ametria Dock – backing vocals, vocal arrangement
- TJ Doherty – engineer
- Simon "Woodchuck" Durham – bass
- Mike Elizondo – bass, drum programming, sampled guitar
- Melissa Etheridge – guitar, vocals, producer
- James Farber – engineer, mixing
- Sam Farrar – drums, programming, producer, engineer, mixing
- Angela Fisher – choir director
- Gary Fly – assistant engineer
- John Frye – mixing
- Ronald B. Gillyard – voices, A&R, talent coordinator
- Steven Girmant – production coordination
- Tom Gloady – assistant engineer
- Noah Goldstein – assistant
- Berry Gordy Jr. – advisor, inspiration
- Bonnie Greenberg – leader, A&R, talent coordinator
- Gary "Sugar Foot" Greenberg – leader
- Don Grolnick – organ, synthesizer, piano, producer
- Kevin Hanson – guitar
- Andre Harris – producer, vocal producer
- Henry Hirsch – engineer
- Jennifer Hudson – vocals
- Femi Jiya – engineer, mixing
- Chris Johnson – trumpet, drum programming
- Jimmy Johnson – bass
- Jamar Jones – string arrangements
- Thornell Jones – production coordination
- Padraic Kerin – engineer
- Lenny Kravitz – producer, mixing
- Emma Kummrow – violin}
- Nathaniel Kunkel – assistant engineer
- Jared Kvitka – assistant engineer
- Matthew Boomer La Monica – assistant engineer
- Michael Landau – electric guitar
- James Landry – engineer, mixing
- Adam Lesnick – French horn
- Adam Levine – guitar, vocals
- Fritz Lewak – percussion, drums
- Robert C. Ludwig – mastering
- Mickey Madden – bass
- Bill Malina – engineer
- Will Markwell – engineer
- Maroon 5 – producer
- Robert Martin – violin
- Harvey Mason Jr. – vocal producer
- Steve McKeever – producer, executive producer
- Thierry Migeotte – mastering, vocal effect
- Katherine Miller – assistant engineer
- Lamar Mitchell – programming
- Peter Nocella – viola
- Jim O'Rourke – string arrangements
- Marvin "Chanz" Parkman – keyboards
- Ila Parvaz – production coordination
- Jon Polk – leader
- K.C. Porter – keyboards, musician
- Aaron Prellwitz – assistant
- Dave Reitzas – vocal engineer
- Jacques Richmond – digital editing
- Pamela Robinson – research, A&R, selection, talent coordinator
- Erik Rostad – violin
- Philip Sayce – guitar, backing vocals
- Jim Scott – mixing
- Ian Shea – assistant
- Rob Skipworth – assistant
- Beau Sorenson – assistant
- Moses Staimez – guitar
- Erik Steigen – A&R, talent coordinator
- Igor Szwec – violin
- Gregory Teperman – violin
- Robin Thicke – vocals
- Ryan Toby – vocal producer, choir arrangement
- Cekoya Tolbert – backing vocals
- Jeff Trott – electric guitar
- Jochem van der Saag – synthesizer, programming, engineer, mixing, sound design
- Carlos Vega – drums
- Dale Voelker – art direction, design
- Bruce Walker – A&R, project manager
- Christopher Walla – producer, engineer
- Rob Wanda – scratching
- Charles Whitfield – coordination
- Alain Whyte – bass, guitar
- will.i.am – piano, drums, producer, engineer, Fender Rhodes, mixing
- Monica Williams – intern
- Lily Wilson – backing vocals
- BeBe Winans – producer
- Oprah Winfrey – executive producer
- Stevie Wonder – arranger, producer
- John Ziemski – assistant
