= Henry Clayton =

Henry Clayton may refer to:

- Henry DeLamar Clayton (general) (1827–1889), Confederate officer and Alabama legislator
- Henry D. Clayton Jr. (1857–1929), US congressman from Alabama
- Henry Helm Clayton (1861–1946), American meteorologist

== See also ==
- Clayton Henry, comic book artist
- Harry Clayton (disambiguation)
- Clayton (disambiguation)
