= Andrew Scott (Canadian jazz guitarist) =

Canadian jazz guitarist and professor

- Born: Andrew Jacob Scott; Toronto, Ontario, Canada
- Genres: Jazz
- Occupation: Musician
- Instrument: Guitar
- Labels: Sackville

Andrew Jacob Scott is a Canadian jazz guitarist and professor from Toronto.

== Career ==
After playing French horn in middle school, Scott turned to guitar in high school. His introduction to jazz came from his mother's albums of Dave Brubeck, Junior Mance, and Oscar Peterson. He attended Humber College and was taught by Pat LaBarbera, Don Thompson, and Charles Tolliver. He received a master's degree from the New England Conservatory of Music and a doctorate from York University.

== Career ==
Scott has taught at Humber, York, and the University of Guelph. From 2007 to 2008, he was managing editor of Coda. He has worked with Harry Allen, Dan Block, Jim Clayton, Gene DiNovi, Bob James, Earl Klugh, Tony Monaco, Bob Moses, Mike Murley, David Sanborn, Randy Sandke, and Grant Stewart.

== Discography ==
With the Andrew Scott Quartet

- This One's for Barney (Sackville, 2004)
- Blue Mercer (Sackville, 2006)
- Nostalgia (Sackville, 2009)
- The Brightest Minute (Cellar Live, 2017)

With the Clayton/Scott Group

- The Clayton/Scott Group (CSG, 2002)
- So Nice (Boomtang/Koch, 2004)

With One Step Beyond

- One Step Beyond (Mo'Funk, 1996)
- One Step Beyond and J&B Scotch (J&B, 1998)
- Live in Montreal (OSB, 1998)
