= Justice Clayton =

Justice Clayton or Judge Clayton may refer to:

- Boyce G. Clayton (1929–2020), associate justice of the Kentucky Supreme Court
- John M. Clayton (1796–1856), chief justice of the Delaware Superior Court
- Preston C. Clayton (1903–1996), associate justice of the Alabama Supreme Court
- Thomas Clayton (1777–1854), chief justice of the Delaware Supreme Court

== See also ==
- Clayton (disambiguation)
- Judge Clayton (disambiguation)
