= Judge Clayton =

Judge Clayton may refer to:

- Claude Feemster Clayton (1909–1969), judge of the United States Court of Appeals for the Fifth Circuit
- Henry De Lamar Clayton Jr. (1857–1929), judge of the United States District Courts for the Middle District and Northern Districts of Alabama

== See also ==
- Justice Clayton (disambiguation)
