= Jack Clayton (disambiguation) =

Jack Clayton (1921–1995) was a British film director and producer.

Jack Clayton may also refer to:

- Jack Clayton (American football) (1915–1997), American football, basketball, and baseball coach
- Jack Clayton (cricketer) (born 1999), Australian cricketer

== See also ==
- John Clayton (disambiguation)
