= Meirelles =

Meirelles may refer to the following Brazilian people:

- Fernando Meirelles (born 1955), film director
- Francinilson Meirelles (born 1990), footballer
- Helena Meirelles (1924–2005), a Brazilian guitar player and composer
- Henrique Meirelles (born 1945), banker and politician
- Jacqueline Meirelles (born 1963), model and TV host
- J. T. Meirelles (1940–2008), bossa nova, samba and jazz musician
- Nelson Meirelles, musician in O Rappa, a reggae/rock band
- Priscilla Meirelles (born 1983), model
- Victor Meirelles (1832–1903), painter

== See also ==
- Meireles
