= Clayton, West Virginia =

Unincorporated community in West Virginia, United States

- Unincorporated community
- Location within West Virginia Location within the United States
- Coordinates: 37°43′24″N 80°43′44″W
- Country: United States
- State: West Virginia
- County: Summers
- Elevation: 2,034 ft (620 m)
- Time zone: UTC-5 (Eastern (EST))
  - Summer (DST): UTC-4 (EDT)
- Area codes: 304 & 681
- GNIS feature ID: 1549630

Clayton is an unincorporated community in Summers County, West Virginia, United States. The community was first settled in 1813. Clayton once had a post office, which opened in 1879 and closed in 1959.

== Geography ==
Clayton is located at 37°43′24″N 80°43′44″W. It is situated in the Ridge-and-Valley Appalachians and has an elevation of 2,034 feet (620 m). It is south of Keeney Knob, the tallest mountain in Summers County at 3,921 feet (1,195 m). Other nearby mountains include Dempsey Mountain and Red Spring Mountain. Clayton is located on the Righthand Fork of Hungart's Creek, a branch of the Greenbrier River.

The nearest post office to Clayton is located in Pence Springs, which is 4 miles (6.4 km) south of Clayton and has ZIP code 24962. The nearest incorporated town is Alderson, in neighboring Greenbrier and Monroe Counties, which is 5.6 miles (9.0 km) east of Clayton. Clayton is 15.9 miles (25.6 km) east-northeast of Hinton, the county seat of Summers County.

== History ==
The first land grant in Clayton was made in 1786 to Colonel James Graham of Lowell. The first settlers in Clayton were Joseph Graham and his family, who settled at Clayton in 1813. Graham soon built a gristmill in the community, the first in the surrounding area. The community earned its name in 1835, when Cincinnati balloonist Richard Clayton landed near the community after a 300-mile (480 km), 9.5-hour flight; his flight set United States records for ballooning, and he stayed in the community for three days to see local visitors. A church which also served as a school was built in Clayton in the 1850s. The first settlers of Clayton practiced an agricultural lifestyle, but lumber became a prominent industry after the Chesapeake and Ohio Railway opened a branch near the community.

Clayton's post office opened on November 3, 1879 on the site of Joseph Graham's home; the original postmaster was David Graham Ballengee. A new post office building was built in 1892. David Graham Ballengee served as postmaster until 1939; his 59-year tenure as postmaster made him the tenth-longest-serving postmaster in United States history. Ballengee was succeeded as postmaster by his son, Homer Ballengee, who served as postmaster until the post office closed on March 31, 1959.

== Transportation ==
Clayton is served by two main county highways, Summers County Route 6 and Summers County Route 7. It is also served by several fractional county highways: Summers County Route 6/1, Summers County Route 7/11, Summers County Route 7/12, and Summers County Route 7/13. The nearest state highways to Clayton are West Virginia Route 3 and West Virginia Route 12 which run concurrent to the south and east of Clayton. The nearest interstate highway to Clayton is Interstate 64, which has exits in Sandstone and Green Sulphur Springs to the northwest of Clayton.

The nearest rail line to Clayton is a CSX line which runs through Pence Springs. This line also carries Amtrak's Cardinal service; its nearest stop to Clayton is in Alderson.
