= Yes We Can (will.i.am song) =

Promotional single by will.i.am featuring various artists
- Released: February 2, 2008
- Recorded: Ethernet and Record Plant, Los Angeles, January 31, 2008
- Length: 4:05
- Label: will.i.am
- Songwriters: will.i.am; Barack Obama; Jon Favreau; George Pajon Jr.
- Producers: will.i.am; Mike Jurkovac; Dylan "3-D" Dresdow (mixed by)

Music video
- "Yes We Can" on YouTube

"Yes We Can" is a song produced by The Black Eyed Peas frontman will.i.am, released as promotional single on February 2, 2008.

== Production ==
Although the lyrics are entirely quotations from Obama's concession speech in the New Hampshire presidential primary, the Obama campaign had no involvement in its production. The speech was written by then-Obama speechwriter Jon Favreau. The viral music video, shot in a sparse black-and-white, features Obama's image in collage fashion; the performers, among them celebrities including musicians, singers and actors, echo his words in a hip-hop, call-and-response manner as his voice plays in the background. The song was produced by will.i.am and mixed by Dylan "3-D" Dresdow, and the music video was directed by Jesse Dylan, the son of singer Bob Dylan.

== Release ==
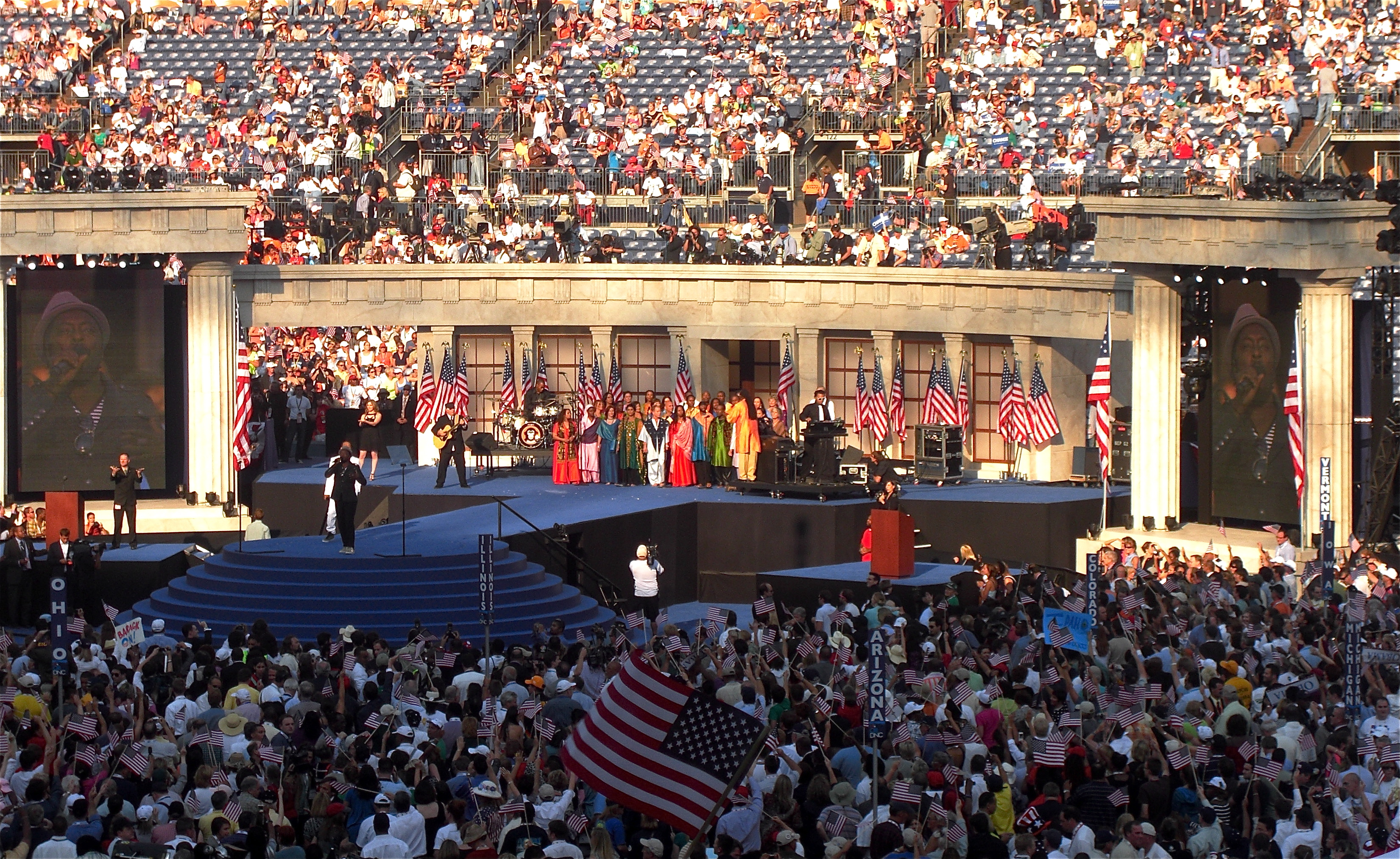
will.i.am performs "Yes We Can" during the final day of the 2008 Democratic National Convention in Denver, Colorado.

Since the original posting on YouTube, the video has been re-posted a number of times by other users and as of February 23, 2008, the video had been watched a combined total of more than 22 million times among all of the postings. It had also been viewed more than 4 million times on Dipdive, for a combined web total of more than 26 million viewings. By July 22, 2008, the video had been watched over 21 million times on YouTube and other sites. The video also won will.i.am a Webby Award for "Artist of the Year". It was criticized, however, by conservative commentators for being over-the-top and worshipful. John Legend and will.i.am performed the song on the final day of the 2008 Democratic National Convention at INVESCO Field, Denver, Colorado.

== Music video ==
The music video was released on Dipdive.com and also on YouTube.com under the username 'WeCan08'. It was honored with the first-ever Emmy Award for Best New Approaches in Daytime Entertainment. The video is a collage-style music video inspired by Barack Obama's popularization of the slogan "Yes we can", which became a secondary slogan for his campaign. During the 2008 US presidential campaign following the New Hampshire Democratic Primary, then-Senator Barack Obama, used the similar English translation of the slogan of United Farm Workers (UFW) – "Sí, se puede" (Spanish for "Yes, you can" or "Yes, it can be done") in his speech. The slogan dates back to 1972 when Cesar Chavez and the UFW's co-founder, Dolores Huerta, came up with the slogan during Chavez's 24-day fast in Phoenix, Arizona. The music video premiered on television on ABC News Now's What's the Buzz on February 1, 2008. On February 2, 2008, it was featured on the Obama campaign's community blog, and later promoted as a viral video by the campaign on its website. The clip was played prior to a February 12, 2008, campaign rally of nearly 20,000 at the Kohl Center on the campus of the University of Wisconsin–Madison. The video was edited by Terence "Biff" Butler of Rock Paper Scissors, and executive producers included will.i.am, Mike Jurkovac, Fred Goldring, Jesse Dylan, Priscilla Cohen and Sheri Howell and Lilo. Associate producers included Sean Larkin, Sarah Pantera, Carol Cohen, Steve Koskie, Wendi Morris, and Scott Spanjich. The following celebrities were featured in the video:

- Scarlett Johansson - 0:05
- Kareem Abdul-Jabbar - 0:21
- Common - 0:23
- John Legend - 0:32
- Bryan Greenberg (guitar) - 0:37
- Kate Walsh - 0:44
- Tatyana Ali - 0:44
- Harold Perrineau Jr. - 0:49
- Aisha Tyler - 1:01
- Samuel Page - 1:03
- Enrique Murciano - 1:07 "Sí, podemos" - 1:17
- Maya Rubin - 1:08 "כֵּן אָנוּ יְכוֹלִים (Ken Anu Yekholim)" (Hebrew)
- Esthero - 1:10
- Eric Balfour - 1:23
- Nicole Scherzinger - 1:30
- Taryn Manning - 1:40
- Amber Valletta - 1:52
- Auden McCaw (in Valetta's arms) - 1:52
- Kelly Hu - 1:52
- Adam Rodríguez - 1:56 "Sí se puede"
- Eric Christian Olsen - 2:02
- Sarah Wright - 2:02
- Shoshannah Stern (American Sign Language) - 2:05
- Ed Kowalczyk (guitar) - 2:19
- Fonzworth Bentley (violin) - 2:38
- Amaury Nolasco - 3:24
- Hill Harper - 3:27
- Nick Cannon - 3:36
- Trott Felipe - 3:38
- Herbie Hancock (piano) - 3:41
- Johnathon Schaech - 3:45
- Austin Nichols - 3:50
- Tracee Ellis Ross - 4:00
- Fred Goldring (guitar) - 4:03

=== Parodies ===
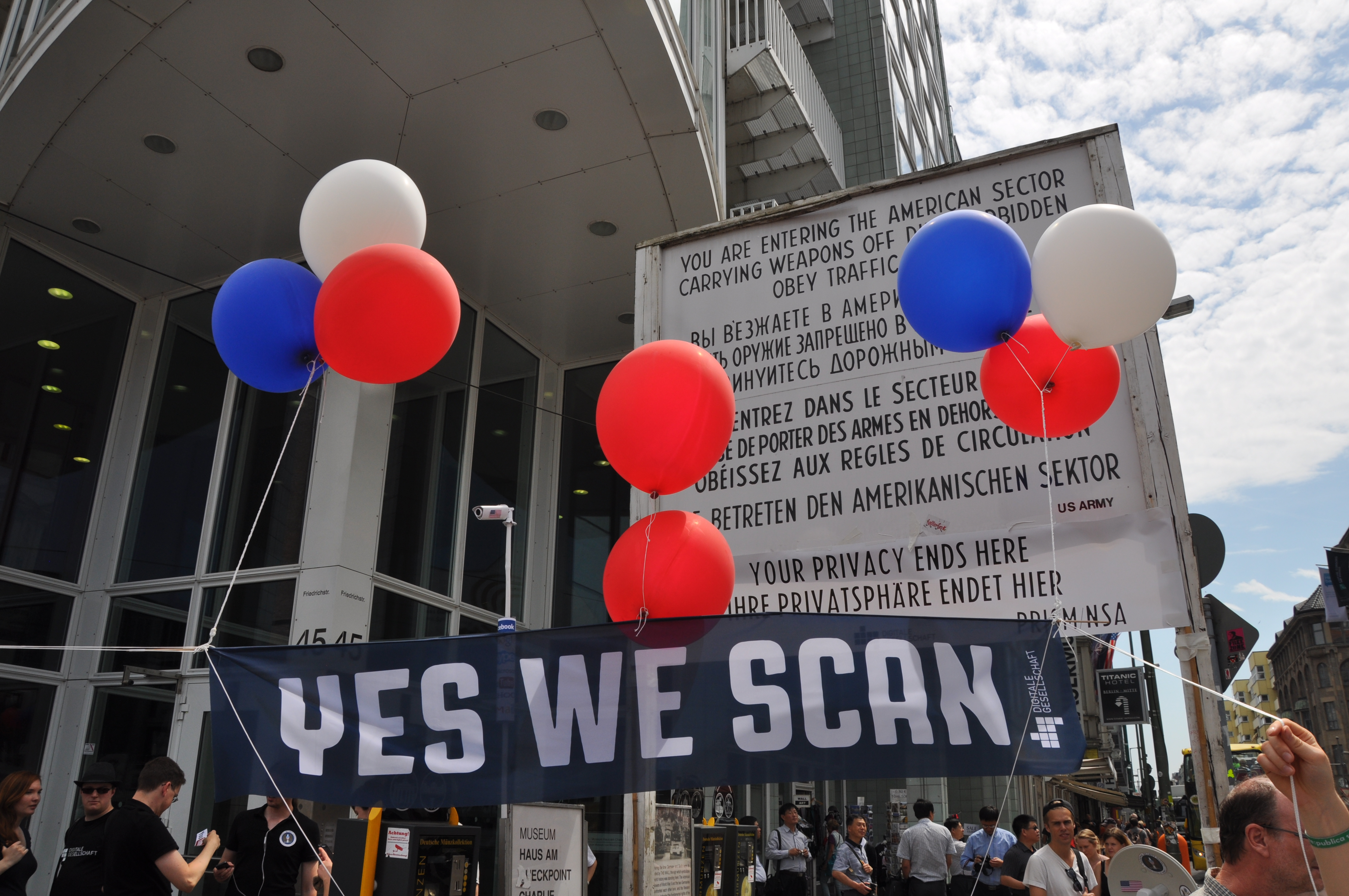
Protesters against the NSA surveillance program PRISM.

The song inspired the spoof songs "john.he.is" and "No You Can't" satirizing the Republican candidate John McCain. Another parody, created by Attack of the Show!, replaces Obama with the G.I. Joe villain Cobra Commander. It inspired yet another parody on Best Week Ever, which made fun of Lindsay Lohan for an online interview in which she both allegedly called Obama "colored" and discussed her collection of leggings. MADtv did a parody called "Yes I Can," about how North Korean dictator Kim Jong-Il (played by Bobby Lee) has the power to eventually destroy the world.

A parody of the song was made on the July 15, 2009 episode of The Chaser's War on Everything, in which a song and video was created based on Australian Prime Minister Kevin Rudd's speeches. It also featured celebrity appearances (from the likes of Shaun Micallef, Lisa Wilkinson, Stuart MacGill, Tony Martin, Hamish Blake and Andy Lee among others).

== See also ==
- It's a New Day (will.i.am song)
