= Claydon (surname) =

Claydon is a surname with English origins. It is a habitational name, denoting lineage from several potential locations in England. Notable people with the surname include:

- Arthur Claydon (1885–1918), British-Canadian soldier
- Brett Claydon (born 1982), English darts player
- George Claydon (1933–2001), British actor
- Leonard Claydon (1915–1971), Manitoba politician
- Lizzy Claydon (born 1972), Australian soccer player
- Hannah Claydon (born 1986), English model
- Mitch Claydon (born 1982), Australian-English cricketer
- Russell Claydon (born 1965), English professional golfer
- Sharon Claydon (born 1964), Australian politician
- Steven Claydon (born 1969), British sculptor and musician
- Tony Claydon (born 1965), British historian

== See also ==
- Alan Claydon-Fink, South African Navy officer
