= John Clayton =

John Clayton may refer to:

== People ==
=== Writers ===
- John Clayton (architect) (died 1861), English architect and writer
- John Clayton (sportswriter) (John Travis Clayton, 1954–2022), American sportswriter and reporter
- John Bell Clayton (c. 1907–1955), American writer
- John J. Clayton, American fiction writer, teacher, and editor

=== Other people in arts and entertainment ===
- John Clayton Adams (1840–1906), English landscape artist
- John Clayton (Australian actor) (1940–2003), Australian actor
- John Clayton (bassist) (John Lee Clayton Jr., born 1952), American jazz bassist
- John Clayton (British actor) (John Alfred Calthrop, 1845–1888), British actor
- John Clayton (painter) (1728–1800), English artist

=== Politics ===
- John Clayton (Roundhead) (1620–?), English politician
- John Clayton (d. 1737) (c. 1666–1737), British lawyer who became burgess and attorney general of colonial Virginia 1714–1737
- John Clayton (town clerk) (1792–1890), antiquarian and town clerk of Newcastle upon Tyne, England
- John M. Clayton (1796–1856), U.S. Senator from Delaware and U.S. Secretary of State
  - Statue of John M. Clayton, 1934
- John M. Clayton (Arkansas politician) (1840–1889), U.S. Representative from Arkansas, assassinated in 1889
- John Clayton Allen (1860–1939), American politician

=== Sports ===
- John Clayton (cricketer) (John Morton Clayton, 1857–1938), English cricketer
- John Clayton (footballer, born 1961), Scottish footballer
- John Clayton (footballer, born 1907), English footballer
- John Clayton (rugby union) (1848–1924), England rugby union player

=== Other people ===
- John Clayton (botanist) (1694–1773), also Anglican minister and Gloucester County clerk, son of John Clayton (d. 1737)
- John Clayton (divine) (1709–1773), English cleric, Methodist and Jacobite
- John Clayton (minister) (1754–1843), English Independent

== Fictional characters ==
- John Clayton, Lord Greystoke, birthname of the fictional character Tarzan

== See also ==
- Jonny Clayton (born 1974), Welsh darts player
- Jack Clayton (disambiguation)
