= Steve Banks (photographer) =

American photographer, artist and director

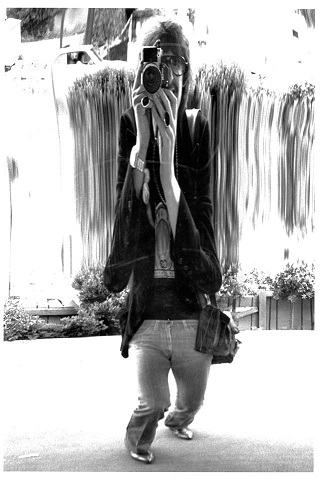
Steve Banks, self portrait

Stephen (Steve) Anthony Banks (born February 14, 1938, in Washington, D.C.) is an American photographer, artist, advertising art director, commercial film producer, director and co-owner of Wright-Banks Films, Los Angeles.

Banks was born in Washington, D.C., and grew up in San Carlos, California, and Evanston, Illinois. As a middle school student, he was awarded a scholarship to the Art Institute of Chicago. While serving in the U.S. Air Force in the 1950s, he exhibited his photographic work.

In the 1960s, Banks began a long career in advertising, first at Leo Burnett, Chicago, and later at William Esty Company, New York, McCann Erickson, São Paulo, Brazil, Ogilvy & Mather, São Paulo and Los Angeles, and Dailey & Associates, Los Angeles. He served as president of The Western Region Agency Producers (WRAP), vice president and board member of the Association of Independent Commercial Producers (AICP), and as a member of the Committee of Commercial Production of the American Association of Advertising Agencies (AAAA).

While continuing to work in advertising, Banks pursued photography, working on subjects including drag racing, rock musicians, and Brazilian entertainers. In the 1970s, while living in Los Angeles, he produced a series of photographic essays titled Hollywood Souvenirs, Hollywood People, Bruised But Not Forgotten, Monroe: Beyond the Grave, California Cadillacs, Death Management, Doggie Heaven and Jazz Visions. He has also published two books, Janis' Garden Party (Bugigaga Press) and Nitro (Nazaeli Press). He is the winner of numerous photography awards, including Lucie Awards (Lucie Foundation) and a Leica Medal of Excellence (Western Region). His photographs have been widely published and are included in many public and private collections (The Academy of Motion Picture Arts & Sciences, the Ronald Reagan Library, the Rock and Roll Hall of Fame Museum, the Country Music Hall of Fame, the Grand Ole Opry Museum, the Jimi Hendrix Museum and the Richard Avedon Institute). His photography has also appeared as cover art on albums by Tony Bennett, Ray Charles, Sammy Davis Jr., the Clayton Brothers, Alan Broadbent/Lee Konitz, Johnny Winter and Janis Joplin.

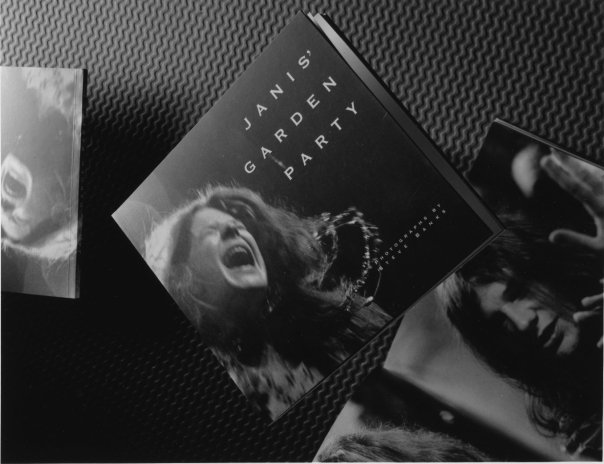
"Janis' Garden Party"

Since 2000, Banks has focused on painting and sculpture. His work employs polyethylene, resin, glue, plastic sheeting, aluminum foil, and other unorthodox materials in tactile collages, constructions and assemblages.

Banks's photographs at MPTV Images.
