= Cleyton (footballer, born 1984) =

Brazilian footballer (born 1984)

Personal information
- Full name: Cleyton Campos de Melo
- Date of birth: 2 January 1984 (age 42)
- Place of birth: Venda Nova do Imigrante, Brazil
- Height: 1.80 m (5 ft 11 in)
- Position: Forward

Team information
- Current team: Rio Branco

Senior career*
Years	Team	Apps	(Gls)
2010	Rio Branco	8	(5)
2010	Boa	2	(0)
2011	Ypiranga Erechim	0	(0)
2011	Portuguesa	18	(2)
2012	Universitatea Cluj	15	(2)
2013	Guaratinguetá	14	(0)
2014	Aimoré	0	(0)
2014	Guarany de Sobral	0	(0)
2015	Ypiranga Erechim	0	(0)
2015	Lajeadense	12	(2)
2016	Rio Branco	0	(0)
2017–2019	Rio Branco de Venda Nova	0	(0)
2019–	Rio Branco	0	(0)
- * Club domestic league appearances and goals as of 9 July 2020

Cleyton Campos de Melo (born 2 January 1984) is a Brazilian footballer who plays as a forward for Rio Branco. In 2012 he had his only experience outside Brazil playing in Romania for Liga I club Universitatea Cluj.

== Honours ==
Portuguesa

- Campeonato Brasileiro Série B: 2011
