= Keeney Knob =

Mountain in the U.S. state of West Virginia

Keeney's Knob

Highest point
- Elevation: 3,921 ft (1,195 m)
- Coordinates: 37°46′24″N 80°42′19″W

Geography
- Location: Summers County, West Virginia, U.S.
- Parent range: Ridge-and-Valley Appalachians
- Topo map: USGS Dawson

Keeney's Knob is a mountain of the Ridge-and-Valley Appalachians in Summers County, West Virginia. It is the highest point in Summers County. The mountain is the site of the WVNS-TV transmitter. The city nearest to Keeney's Knob is Alderson.
