= R. Gilbert Clayton =

American film set designer

- Born: Reed Gilbert Clayton; October 15, 1922; Los Angeles, California, U.S.
- Died: January 31, 2013 (aged 90); Aptos, California, U.S.
- Occupation: Film set designer

Reed Gilbert Clayton (October 15, 1922 – January 31, 2013) was an American film set designer whose credits include Batman & Robin, Armageddon and The Untouchables.

Clayton enlisted in the United States Navy and served as a radio operator during World War II. His first set design credit was in the 1975 film Breakheart Pass. He died on January 31, 2013, at the age of 90 in Aptos, California.
