= Clayton Howard =

British make-up artist

- Born: Francis Herbert Fish; 8 July 1934; Liverpool, England
- Died: 24 October 2017 (aged 83)
- Occupation: Make-up artist

Clayton Howard (8 July 1934 – 24 October 2017) was a British make-up artist.

He was born Francis Herbert Fish on 8 July 1934, in a working-class family in Liverpool, the son of James Fish and Ada Fish née Atkinson. He would later take the surname of his mother's second husband, Albert Clayton.

Aged 21, he moved to London, worked as a window display manager, and became Clayton Howard. He worked in the evenings with his friend Maxine Grew as a dance duo – he designed the costumes, and she made them.

In the early 1960s, he trained with Max Factor as a make-up artist, and went on to have clients including Lauren Bacall, Princess Anne, Princess Margaret and Princess Michael of Kent.He worked with the Queen's cousin, the famous photographer Patrick Litchfield. They became firm friends and Clayton was his exclusive makeup artist from that point on working on all his projects including the annual Pirelli Tire calendar

In November 1980, Howard did the make-up for Lady Diana Spencer (and John Frieda did her hair) for the official portrait that was to appear alongside news of her engagement to Prince Charles. He went on to mentor Diana in how to use make-up, and in 1992 published Look Like a Princess.
