= Ruth Clayton =

Lecturer and researcher (1925–2003)

- Born: Ruth Moira Freedman; 10 June 1925; London, England
- Died: 11 January 2003 (aged 77); Edinburgh, Scotland
- Occupations: University lecturer and researcher (reader)

Academic background
- Education: University of Oxford (MA, Zoology)

Academic work
- Discipline: Genetics
- Sub-discipline: Eye Research, embryology, epigenetics, molecular and cellular biology, pathology
- Main interests: Differentiation and transdifferentiation of ocular tissues, extralenticular crystallins, risk factors for cataract, behavioural teratogenesis

Ruth Clayton (née Freedman;10 June 1925 – 2003) was a lecturer and researcher with an international reputation in eye research at the University of Edinburgh in the Institute of Animal Genetics. She was one of a group of scientists who joined the Institute at a time when it was led by C.H. Waddington and when many of the fundamental aspects of modern biology were being elucidated by forward thinking scientists at the university's King's Buildings campus. Leading a large and diverse research group, she applied the newly developing techniques of modern biology to fundamental questions in the fields of developmental biology and pathology of the eye and the brain. Her work was characterised by a rigorously conceptual approach, methodological innovation and a keen interest in the social and ethical implications of scientific and medical research.

== Education and early life ==
Clayton was born in London on 10 June 1925. She studied zoology at the University of Oxford, gaining an MA.

== Research and career ==
=== Institute of Animal Genetics ===
Clayton joined the Institute of Animal Genetics (University of Edinburgh) in 1947 at a time of rapid expansion under the leadership of the biologist and polymath C.H. Waddington. She was one of the original group of scientists there during the 1950s that included notable figures such as Charlotte Auerbach, Geoffrey Beale, Douglas Scott Falconer, Henrik Kacser, Eric Lucey, Eric Reeve, and Alan Robertson. Waddington's initial solution to staff accommodation problems in Edinburgh was the acquisition of the nearby Mortonhall and an experiment in collegiate living, from which Eric Reeve's wife, the artist Edith Simon drew inspiration for her novel The Past Masters (titled House of Strangers in the USA). In 1965, the Medical Research Council and Wellcome Foundation funded the building of a modern tower block, adjacent to the main Institute of Animal Genetics Crew Building on the university's King's Buildings campus to accommodate the research being undertaken by Waddington and his colleagues. By the 1970s, Clayton, DES Truman, John Campbell, Geoffrey Selman, Joe Jacob, John Bishop, Ken Jones and their research groups occupied the tower, all pursuing different aspects of an explicitly epigenetic research programme. When Ruth Clayton's group outgrew the accommodation available in the tower, she refurbished and occupied the first floor of the Crew Building. She retired in 1993 with Emeritus Reader status.

=== Epigenetics and the eye ===
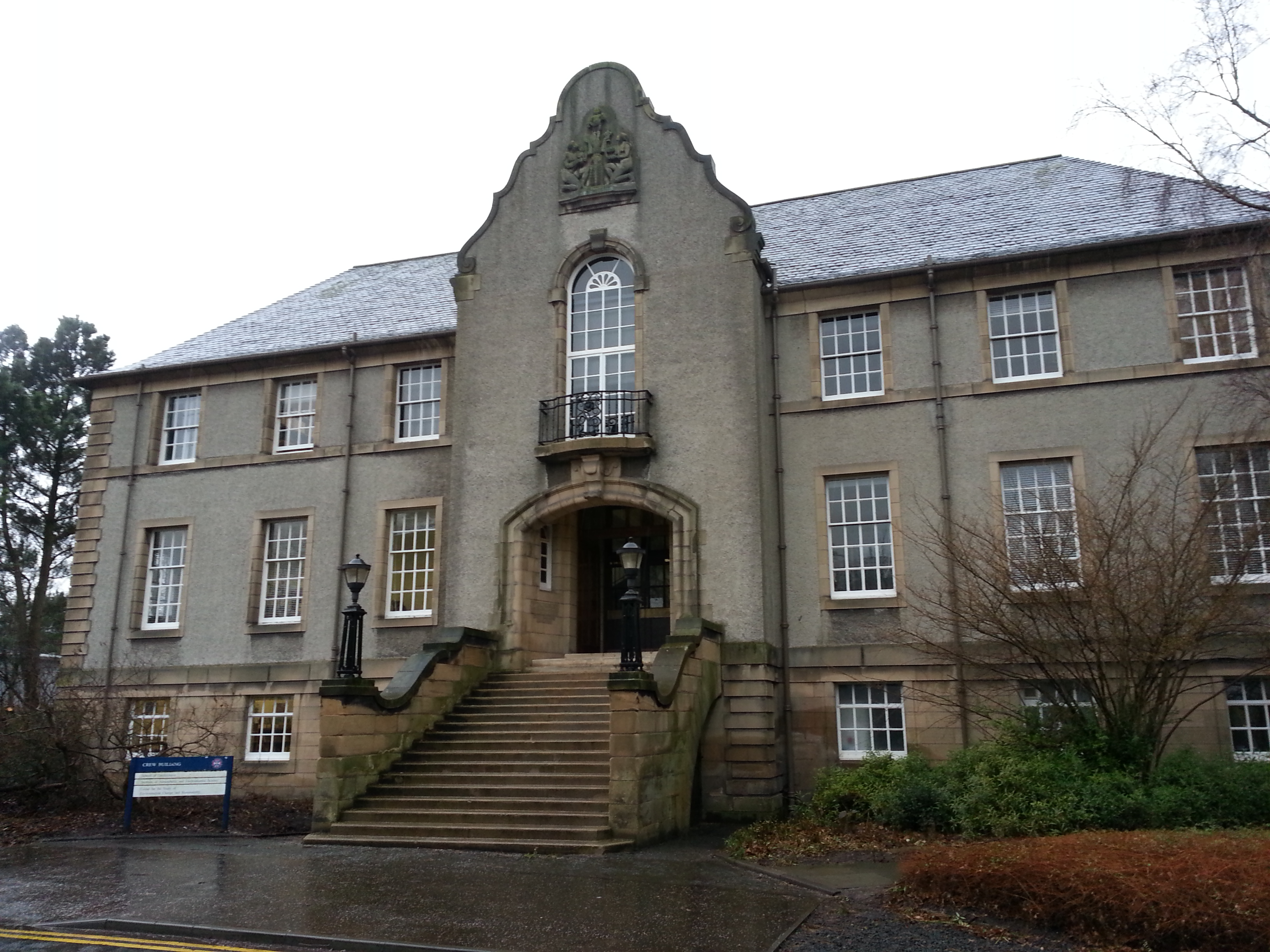
Crew Building, Institute of Animal Genetics, King's Buildings, University of Edinburgh

Epigenetics in its very broadest sense (and that originally intended by Waddington) is the study of the processes by which the information encoded in genes (the genotype) becomes manifest (is expressed) in the observable characteristics (the phenotype) of an individual during development. The eye in general and in particular the abundant proteins of the eye lens, which are termed crystallins provided Clayton and her colleague DES Truman with an ideal system in which to investigate the link between gene expression and cell differentiation during embryonic development. The complexity of crystallin protein composition and expression were explored by early adoption of a wide range of innovative immunological, biochemical, molecular, and cellular techniques then being developed in Edinburgh and elsewhere. On the basis of these and other studies she developed and advocated the view that the differences in gene expression that underlie cell differentiation are quantitative in nature and combinatorial in effect. This nuanced view contrasted markedly with the prevailing ideas at that time of a strict demarcation between “house-keeping" and “luxury" gene products, strictly tissue-specific expression of luxury gene products and a single unitary function for individual proteins. Crystallin gene expression was further explored in a detailed series of studies using long-term cell culture models in which progenitor chick lens cells continuously differentiated into lens fibre cells in controlled laboratory conditions. The intrinsic programme of crystallin gene expression during this process was found to be non-coordinate within and between crystallin protein classes, tightly controlled and resembled the developmental programme seen in the animal itself, but it could be modified by age, genotype, cellular growth rate, and soluble factors. All of this indicated that the epigenetic programme was intrinsic to the cells, but it could be modified by external and internal variables.

=== Differentiation and transdifferentiation of ocular tissues ===
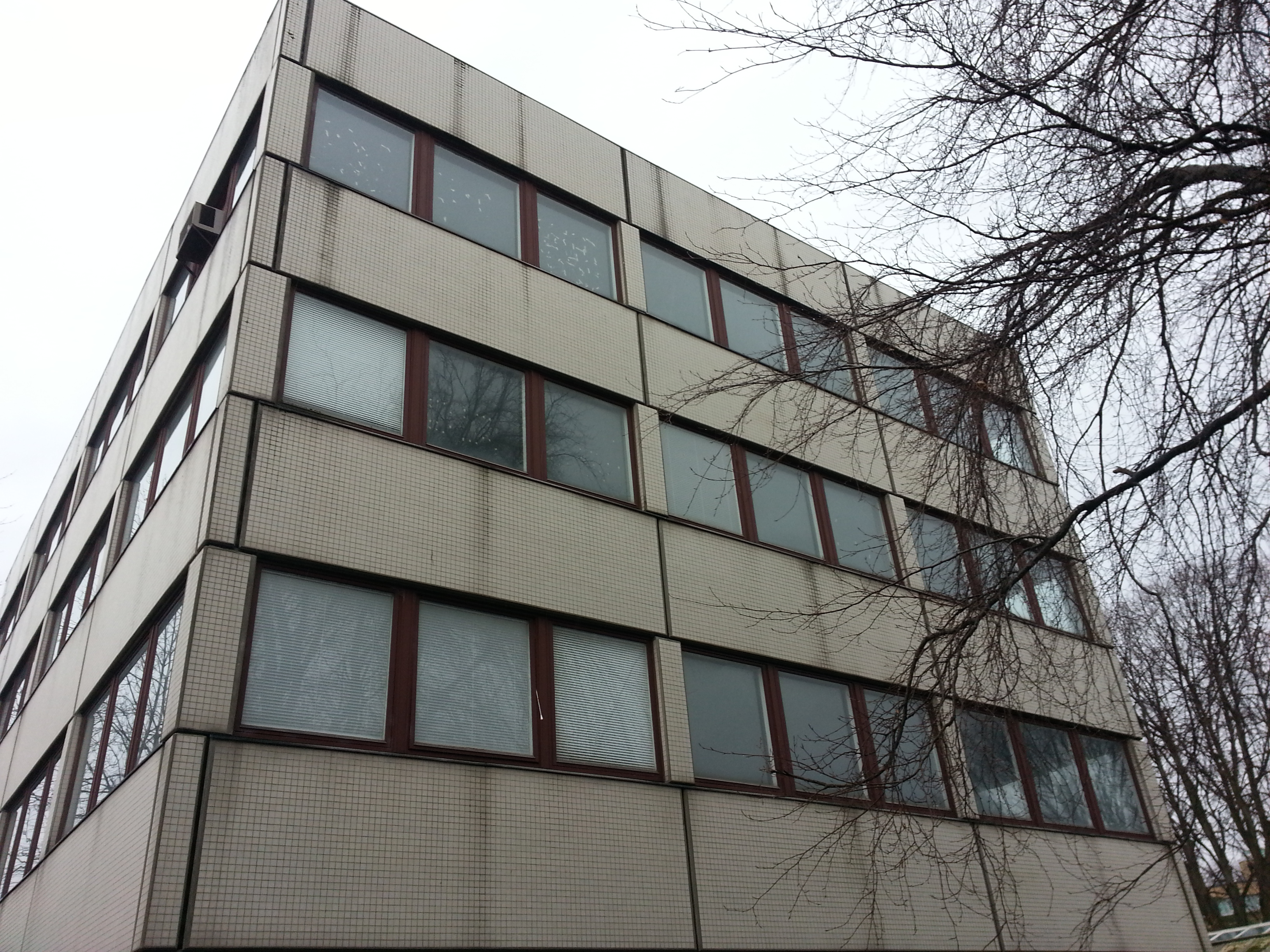
Epigenetics Building, Institute of Animal Genetics, King's Buildings, University of Edinburgh

The epigenetic landscape model of Waddington's proposed that development proceeds by progressive restriction of cell fate, commitment and subsequent differentiation to a range of well-defined cell types. Surprisingly, embryonic chick retinal cells can also differentiate into lens cells under certain conditions when grown isolated in culture; a rare example of the transdifferentiation of one differentiated cell type into another, and a phenomenon that is thought to relate to the capacity of certain species to undergo lens regeneration. Clayton's work showed that although transdifferentiation potential diminishes with age, it involves the expression of authentic lens crystallins according to a precise programme that differs in sequence from that seen during lens differentiation. The potential for transdifferentiation itself being proposed to be related to the prior low-level expression of lens crystallins. From a contemporary perspective, what once appeared to some as an experimental curiosity (ocular transdifferentiation) now seems to represent an early recognised example of the kind of cellular reprogramming that underlies contemporary induced pluripotent stem cell technology and its hoped-for application as truly regenerative medicine.

=== Extralenticular crystallins ===
Schematic representation of the adult vertebrate (chick) lens (1b) and its formation during embryogenesis (1a I-III). From Bower et al., 1983 (Reference 17)

The contention that extralenticular (non-lens) crystallin expression was biologically significant initially attracted the criticisms that it was either an experimental artefact (perhaps resulting from inadvertent lens tissue contamination) or that it represented an example of non-functional (“leaky") gene expression. Definitive demonstration of expression of individual crystallin genes in tissues other than lens, and indeed outside of the eye in several vertebrate species by Clayton's group and other international research groups led to a reversal of this view. A slew of papers ensued on the expression and putative functions of extralenticular crystallins, and specifically their roles in nervous system diseases. Crystallin sequence similarities with, or in some cases their identity to particular enzymes or heat shock proteins led to the concept of gene sharing (or protein moonlighting) as fully developed by Joram Piatigorsky. The abundant water-soluble proteins of the vertebrate lens (by definition, crystallins) are therefore now generally considered to be examples of multifunctional proteins with their precise functions being context- and concentration-dependant, consistent with a combinatorial and quantitative role of gene expression in cell differentiation.

=== Risk factors for cataract ===
Clayton's lens research encompassed both studies of normal and abnormal development, and studies of aging, in particular research on the most common cause of blindness world-wide, namely cataract. A direct approach was employed in which candidate risk factors for cataract were investigated in a large-scale case-controlled study correlating clinical, pathological and biochemical data from cataract patients in South East Scotland. Specific risk factors were identified included the levels of particular blood plasma constituents, coexisting clinical (and sub-clinical) disease and medication and pattern of alcohol use. These studies showed that risk factors were most likely cumulative and that some risk factors correlated with particular cataract types. All of which indicates that so called senile cataract is not a simple function of aging, but more likely has a complex epidemiology, and one in which lens transparency is affected by a life-long accumulation of quantitative and potentially interacting risk factors, both medical and socio-economic.

=== Behavioural teratogenesis ===
Later in her career, Clayton pursued a series of studies in collaboration with University of Edinburgh zoologist Aubrey Manning. Rodent models and cell cultures were used to assess the potentially deleterious effects on foetal neural development of low-level exposure to pharmaceuticals and environmental contaminants during pregnancy. They found that common anticonvulsant drugs and aluminium sulfate had measurable neurochemical and behavioural effects on pups, dams or pup-dam interactions following low-level pre-natal exposure, and that some of these changes were modified by genetics.

== Personal life ==
Clayton was married to geneticist George Clayton. She had four children; Anthony (a professor of sustainable development), Christopher (a physicist), Kate (a translator), and Paul (a nutrition scientist). Latterly, Clayton worked as a councillor and wrote on the ethical implications of genetics. Throughout her life Clayton pursued an active interest in progressive politics and the arts, including speculative fiction and was a talented painter.
