= JoAnn Clayton Townsend =

American science policy analyst

JoAnn Clayton Townsend (née Cleveland, 1935–2020) was an American science policy analyst, the director of the Aeronautics and Space Engineering Board of the National Academy of Sciences.

== Early life and education ==
Townsend was born in 1935 in Fort Smith, Arkansas, the daughter of James William Woolley Cleveland and Rachel Blanch Mary McLaughlin. She was raised in Tulsa, Oklahoma, by her mother, "in extreme poverty". She became a student at the University of Tulsa, on a full scholarship, and graduated Phi Beta Kappa.

In 1955 she married John Clayton, a news reporter. He joined the United States Information Service in 1957, and from 1957 to 1974 she traveled with him to posts around the world. They had a daughter, born in 1959 in Madras, India, and a son, born in 1962 in Tehran, Iran.

== Career and later life ==
From 1963 until 1966, while her husband was posted in Washington, D.C., Townsend became an assistant to the foreign secretary of the National Academy of Sciences. The family returned to the US again in 1974, and Townsend became an assistant to three members of congress, Berkley Bedell, Charles W. Whalen Jr., and Matthew J. Rinaldo.

John Clayton died on June 17, 1977. In 1979, Townsend returned to the National Academy of Sciences staff. Her interest there in space science began with an early assignment to report on Ronald Reagan's 1981 cancellation of funding for a joint solar observation mission between NASA and the European Space Agency that, eventually revived and delayed by the cancellation of the Space Shuttle program, became the Ulysses space probe. During this period, Townsend also returned to school to receive a master's degree in space policy from George Washington University. Soon afterward, she became director of the academy's Aeronautics and Space Engineering Board. She also belonged to the International Institute of Space Law and the International Academy of Astronautics, and became the editor of the annual proceedings of the International Institute of Space Law.

In 1996, she married John W. Townsend Jr., a widowed former president of Fairchild Industries Space Division and former director of the Goddard Space Flight Center. She retired in 1997, and in her retirement became a painter of abstract art, affiliated with the Torpedo Factory Art Center. She became artist in residence at Glen Echo Park (Maryland) for a month in 2011.

Her second husband, Jack Townsend, died of lung cancer on October 29, 2011. Townsend and her daughter moved in 2012 to Maine, where her son and his family lived. She died on December 21, 2020.

== Recognition ==
Townsend received the 1991 Outstanding Achievement Award and the 1997 Outstanding Member Award of Women in Aerospace. She was named as a Fellow of the American Institute of Aeronautics and Astronautics in 2003.
