= It's a New Day (will.i.am song) =

2008 song by will.i.am

Promotional single by will.i.am

from the album Change Is Now: Renewing America's Promise
- Released: November 7, 2008
- Recorded: January 31, 2008
- Studio: Ethernet and Record Plant, Los Angeles
- Genre: Hip hop
- Length: 3:39
- Label: Interscope
- Songwriter: William Adams
- Producer: William Adams

Music video
- "It's a New Day" on YouTube

"It's a New Day" is a song produced and organized by American rapper and producer will.i.am. It was released as promotional single on November 7, 2008, from the political compilation album Change Is Now: Renewing America's Promise (2009). Will performed the song for the first time on The Oprah Winfrey Show. The song was written as a tribute to President Barack Obama's victory. It was used in an episode of the second season of Gossip Girl. A parody of the song was featured on the Boondocks episode "It's a Black President, Huey Freeman". It was titled "Dick Riding Obama", and featured will.i.am, rapper Thugnificent, Gangstalicious and a George Clooney lookalike. A scene from the episode was released on YouTube before the episode aired as a form of viral marketing.

== Music video ==
The song's music video was released in November 2008, and features cameos by various celebrities, including:

- Olivia Wilde
- Kevin Bacon
- Kyra Sedgwick
- Taboo
- Fergie
- apl.de.ap
- Kanye West
- Kerry Washington
- Gayle King
- Brian J. White
- Quincy Jones
- Aisha Tyler
- Harold Perrineau, Jr.
- Joe Biden
- Barack Obama
- Jesse Jackson

== Charts ==
=== Weekly charts ===
Weekly chart performance for "It's a New Day"
Chart (2008–2009)	Peak position
Canada Hot 100 (Billboard)	84
Hungary (Rádiós Top 40)	32
US Billboard Hot 100	78

=== Year-end charts ===
Year-end chart performance for "It's a New Day"
Chart (2009)	Position
Hungary (Rádiós Top 40)	135
