= John Clayton (architect) =

English architect and writer (1820–1861)

John Clayton, FRIBA (1820–1861) was an English architect and writer.

== Life ==
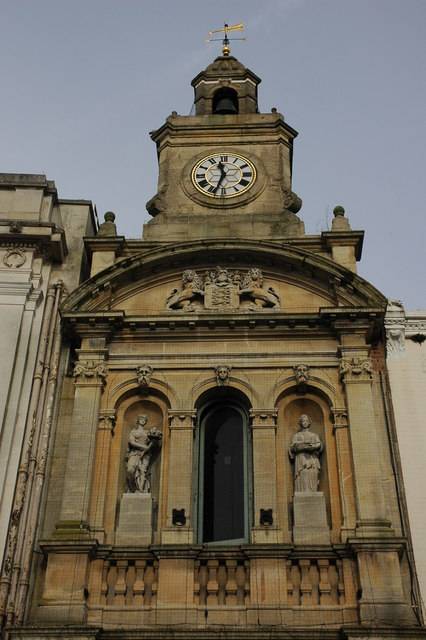
Gatehouse entrance to Market Hall, Hereford

John Clayton was born in Eardisley, Herefordshire, the son of John Clayton, a land steward, by his wife Susan née Harris. He worked for a time in Hereford, where he had a large architectural practice. The market-gateway entrance with a clock-tower in that town was erected from his design, besides numerous other public buildings and private residences.

He came to London in 1838 at the age of eighteen, entered the Royal Academy Schools, and settled in Elizabeth Street, Eaton Square. In 1839 he sent to the Royal Academy a Design for a Villa in the Isle of Wight. On 13 June 1842 he was elected an associate of the Royal Institute of British Architects, and was advanced to the dignity of fellow of the same body on 2 November 1857. He exhibited architectural designs in the Royal Academy in 1844–7, 1853, and 1856, and in 1845 obtained the premium of the Royal Academy in architecture for the most finished drawing in detail of the church of St. Stephen, Walbrook.

Clayton died in 1861, and at the opening meeting at the Royal Institute in November of that year allusion was made to the merits of his works and his architectural abilities.

== Works ==
Clayton is best known for his architectural publications: A Collection of the Ancient Timber Edifices of England, 1846, a most valuable record of those structures, most of which have now disappeared, and The Dimensions, Plans, Elevations, and Sections of the Parochial Churches of Sir Christopher Wren, erected in the cities of London and Westminster, 1848.

In addition to these he published the following sessional papers, contributed by him to the Royal Institute of British Architects: Norman Refectory at Hereford, 1847; Abbey Dore Church and Monastery near Hereford, 1851; Towers and Spires of the City Churches, the works of Sir Christopher Wren, 1852; Bridges and Viaducts of the Present Day, 1856.
