= James Clayton (priest) =

English priest

James Clayton (? at Sheffield, England – 22 July 1588) was an English Roman Catholic priest.

== Life ==
He was the son of a shoemaker, apprenticed to a blacksmith for seven years. He spent his leisure hours in educating himself, giving special attention to the study of Latin. His studies led him to embrace the Catholic religion, and he was sent to the English College at Reims (1582), where he was ordained priest in 1585.

He immediately returned to England on mission work in Yorkshire. Four years later, while visiting the Catholic prisoners in Derby gaol, he was apprehended and condemned to death for exercising his priestly office. His brothers pleaded for his pardon and his execution was delayed, though he was still kept a prisoner. Prison life brought on a sickness of which he died, as a prisoner in Derby gaol.
