= Jim Clayton (musician) =

Canadian pianist and jazz musician

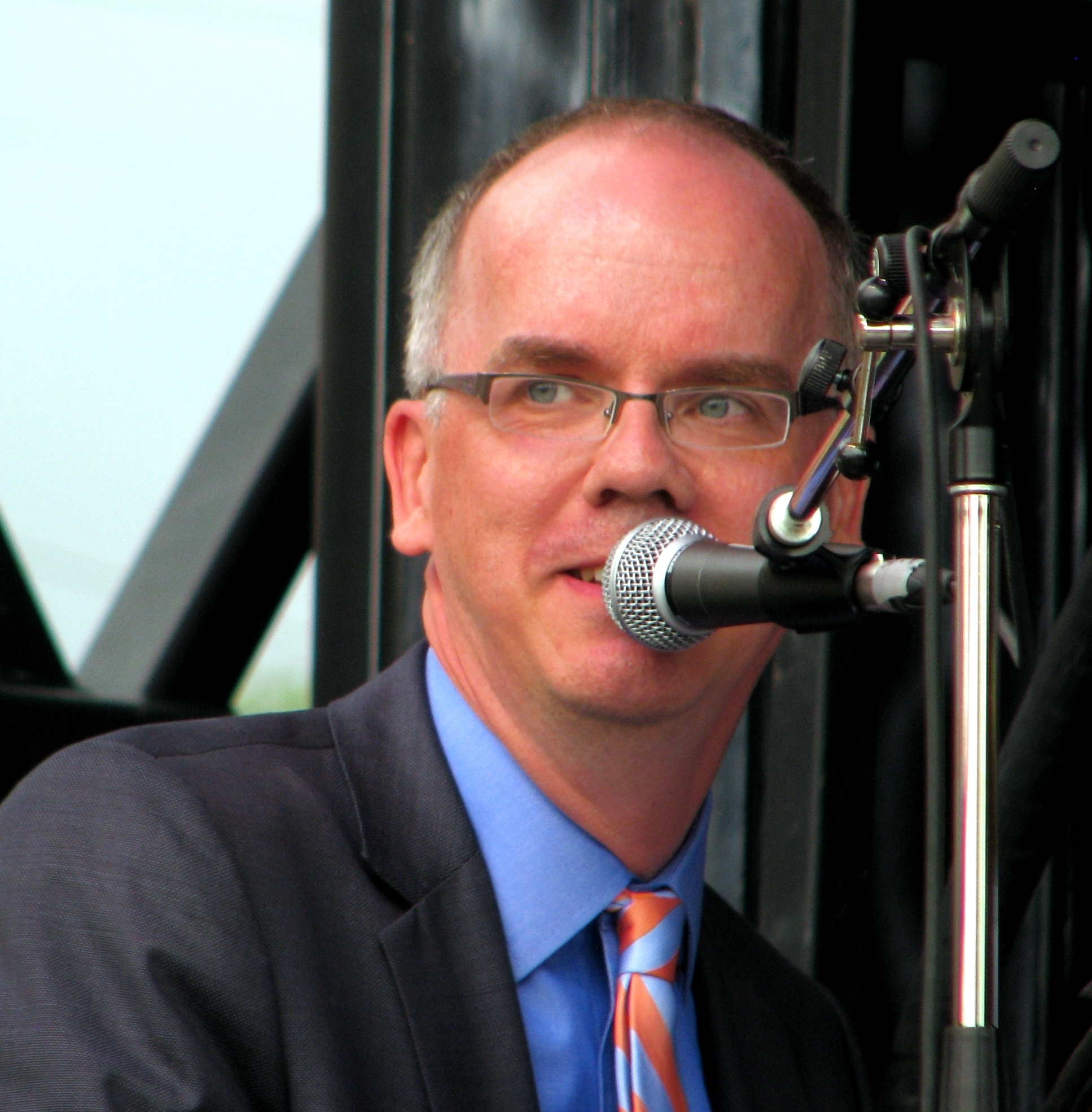
- Jim Clayton at the 2014 UpTown Waterloo Jazz Festival

Background information
- Born: 1967 (age 58–59)
- Genres: Jazz
- Occupations: Pianist, composer
- Instrument: Piano
- Website: www.jimclaytonjazz.com

Jim Clayton (born 1967) is a Canadian pianist and jazz musician. He is the co-leader (with Andrew Scott), pianist and composer for The Clayton/Scott Group. The band won Group of the Year in 2005 and 2006 at the Canadian Smooth Jazz Awards and Best Jazz Recording at the 2004 Canadian Urban Music Awards.

In 2013 Clayton released an album, Songs My Daughter Knows. The album was recorded in New Orleans through Clay-Tone Records with bassist Peter Harris, drummer Jason Marsalis and percussionist Bill Summers.
