= Cleiton (footballer, born April 1986) =

Brazilian footballer (born 1986)

Personal information
- Full name: José Cleiton Ferreira Júnior
- Date of birth: April 6, 1986 (age 40)
- Place of birth: Fortaleza, Brazil
- Height: 1.86 m (6 ft 1 in)
- Position: Striker

Team information
- Current team: Guarany de Sobral

Youth career
- –2006: Fortaleza

Senior career*
Years	Team	Apps	(Gls)
2007–2010	Fortaleza		
2008	→ Horizonte (loan)		
2009	→ MyPa (loan)	5	(1)
2011	Tiradentes		
2011	Anapolina		
2011–	Guarany de Sobral	3	(1)
- * Club domestic league appearances and goals as of 12 October 2011

José Cleiton Ferreira Júnior (born 6 April 1986) is a Brazilian footballer who currently plays for Guarany Sporting Club.
