= Clayton High School =

Clayton High School may refer to:

- Clayton High School (Missouri) — Clayton, Missouri
- Clayton High School (North Carolina) — Clayton, North Carolina
- Clayton Middle/High School — Clayton, New Jersey
- Clayton High School (New Mexico) — Clayton, New Mexico
- Clayton High School (Oklahoma) — Clayton, Oklahoma
- Clayton Valley High School — Concord, California
- North Clayton High School — College Park, Georgia
