= Yes I Can =

Yes I Can may refer to:

- Yes, I Can, a method for teaching adult literacy
- Yes I Can (TV series), a documentary television series
- "Yes I Can", a 1964 song by Sammy Davis Jr., from If I Ruled the World
- "Yes, I Can", a 1965 autobiography by Sammy Davis Jr.

== See also ==
- "Just Say, 'Yes I Can'", a song from Welcome to Pooh Corner
- Oh Yes I Can, a 1989 album by David Crosby
- Yes We Can (disambiguation)
