= Tony Claydon =

British historian

- Born: 1965 (age 60–61)
- Occupations: Historian and academic
- Title: Professor of Early Modern History

Academic background
- Education: Bedford Modern School
- Alma mater: Jesus College, Oxford; University College London

Academic work
- Discipline: History
- Sub-discipline: Early modern Britain; Stuart period; Political history; History of Protestantism; Glorious Revolution
- Institutions: Fitzwilliam College, Cambridge; Bangor University

Tony Claydon (born 1965) is a British historian and Professor of Early Modern History at Bangor University, Wales. He has published extensively on political, social, and religious aspects of the later Stuart era in Britain.

== Career ==
Tony Claydon was educated at Bedford Modern School, Jesus College, Oxford (BA, 1988), and University College London (Ph D, 1993) where he completed a doctoral thesis on William III. From 1992 he was a Junior Research Fellow at Fitzwilliam College, Cambridge. He has been lecturing at Bangor since 1995 and has served as Head of the School of History, Welsh History and Archaeology, Head of the College of Arts and Humanities, and Director of the Institute of Medieval and Early Modern Studies at Aberystwyth and Bangor Universities.

== Research and publications ==
Claydon's research has focused on various social, political, and cultural aspects of the early modern period, including, propaganda, rhetoric, literacy, national identity and religion, historiography, and early modern concepts of time and chronology. William III (2002), William III and the Godly Revolution: Cambridge Studies in Early Modern British History (2004), Europe and the Making of England: Cambridge Studies in Early Modern British History (2007), Protestantism and National Identity: Britain and Ireland, c.1650-1850 (2008), The Revolution in Time: Chronology, Modernity and 1688-89 in England (2020).
