= Sí se puede =

Motto of the United Farm Workers of America

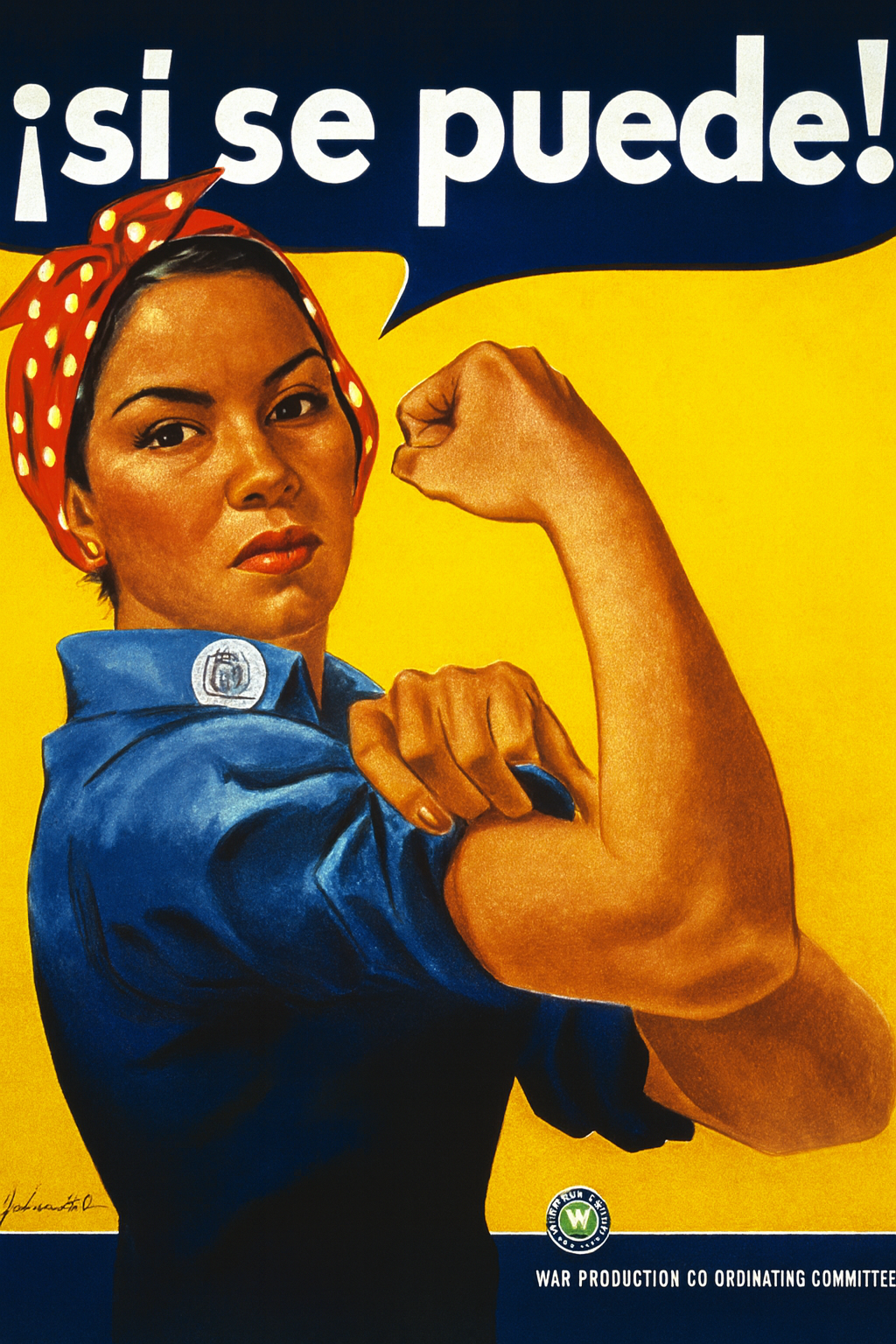
"Sí Se Puede" art, based on the We Can Do It! Poster from World War II.

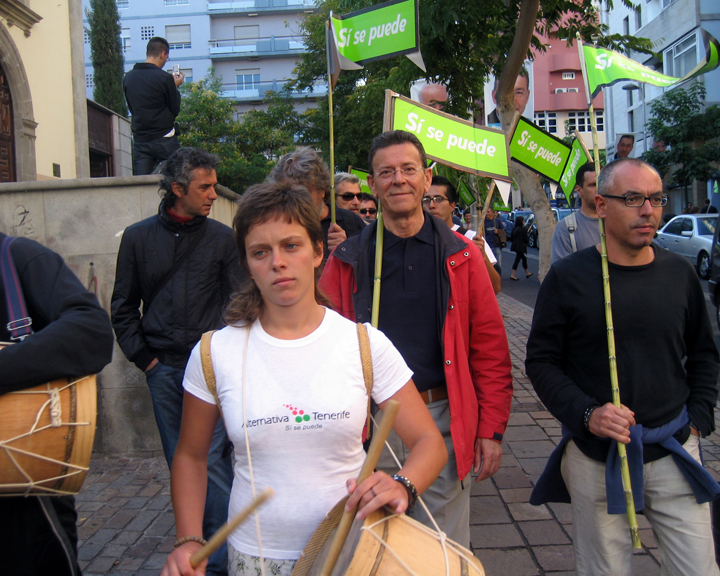
Tenerife demonstrators carrying "Sí se puede" signs

"Sí, se puede" (Spanish for "Yes, you can"; pronounced [ˈsi se ˈpweðe]) is the motto of the United Farm Workers of America, and has since been taken up by other activist groups. UFW co-founder Dolores Huerta created the phrase in 1972 during César Chávez's 25-day fast in Phoenix, Arizona. "Sí se puede" has long been a UFW guiding principle that has inspired the accomplishment of goals. The phrase is a federally registered trademark of the UFW. It has been widely adopted by other labor unions and civil rights organizations, and drew widespread political and media attention as a rallying cry during the U.S. immigration reform protests.

The slogan has also been used in other countries, such as Spain and Venezuela.

== English translation ==
"Sí se puede" is usually translated in English as "It can be done", or "Yes you can". The more literal translation that the United Farm Workers uses is "Yes, it can be done!"

== Other uses ==
The slogan is featured extensively in the 2002 Disney Channel film Gotta Kick It Up!

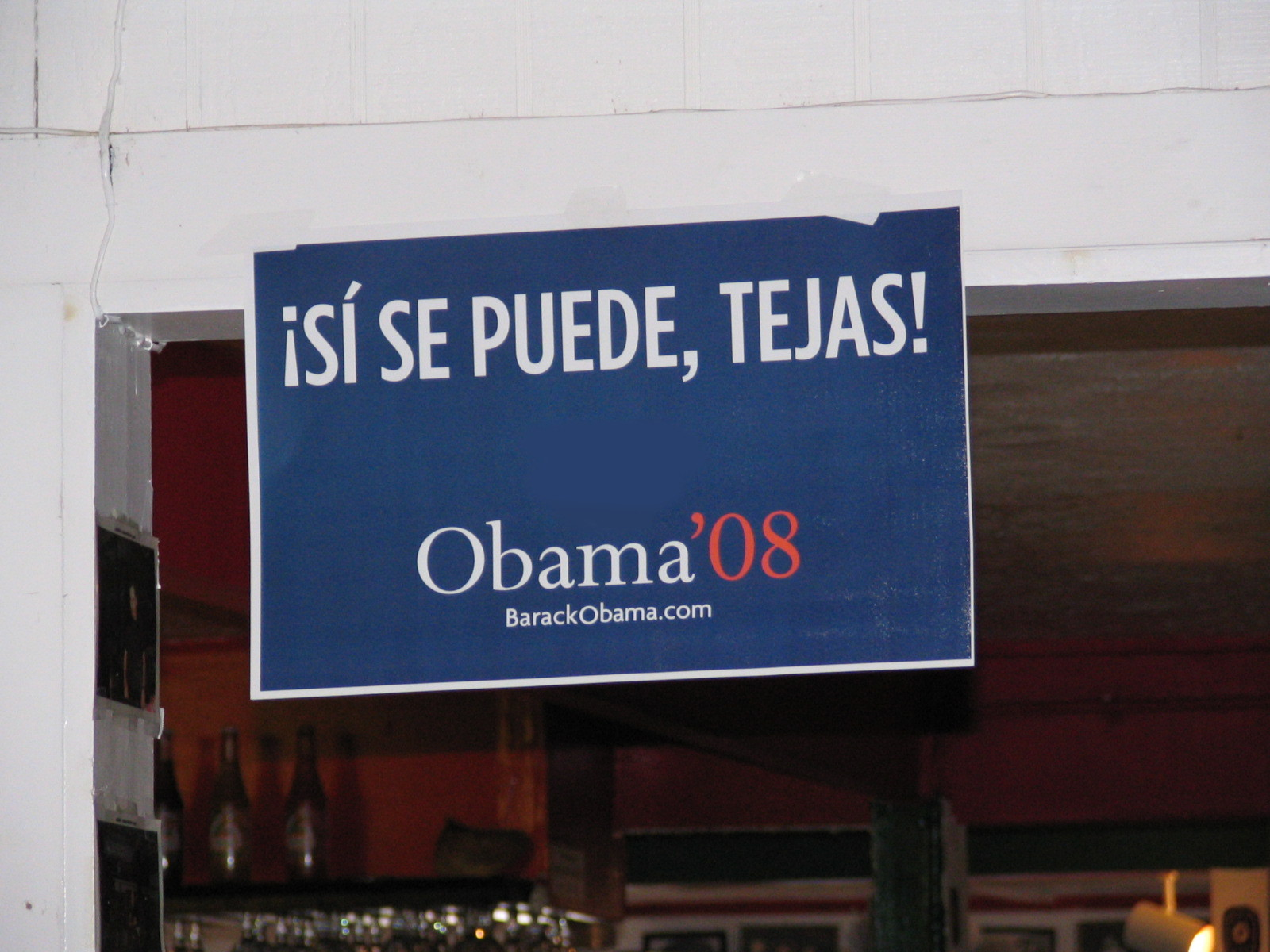
Use of the slogan by the Obama campaign in Austin, Texas. Translated, it reads, "Yes it is possible, Texas!"

President Barack Obama adopted the English version "Yes, we can!" first during the Democratic Party of Illinois primaries leading up to 2004 Illinois elections to the US Senate, and it became a slogan of his 2008 presidential campaign. "Yes, we can!" was the theme of Senator Obama's speech following his second-place finish in the 2008 New Hampshire primary. The phrase was also used in the song "Yes We Can", which was performed by numerous celebrities in support of Obama. (Huerta endorsed Hillary Clinton in her campaign for the Democratic nomination for presidency in 2007.)

"Sí, se puede!" is the name of the 6th Episode in the 3rd Season of Showtime's TV Series Dexter.

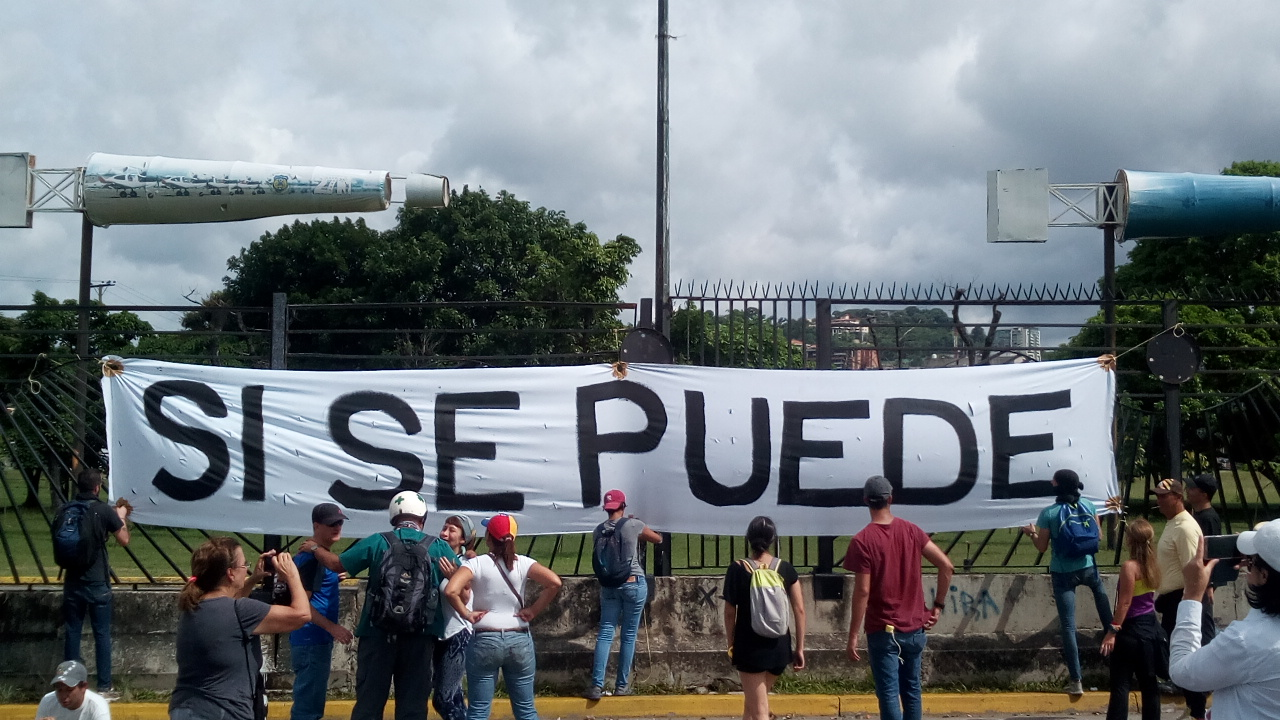
“Sí Se Puede” sign at a Venezuelan sit-in.

"¡Sí, se puede!" was a slogan used by Spanish left wing anti-austerity party, Unidas Podemos in the buildup to the 2019 Spanish general election held on 28 April 2019.

"¡Sí, se puede!" "yes we can" became the slogan and rallying cry of Juan Guaidó during the 2019 Venezuelan presidential crisis.

During the Israeli legislative election campaign of 2009, Shas used a Hebrew language version of the slogan: "כן. אנחנו יכולים" (ken, anakhnu yekholim).

The slogan is referenced in the 2023 film Barbie (which, coincidentally, stars America Ferrera, who was also in Gotta Kick it Up!).

"¡Sí Se Puede!" is the name of the song from the episode "Summer of Cumple" of the Disney Channel animated series, Primos.

=== AeroMexico's trademark application ===
After AeroMexico, a Mexican airline, had filed a trademark application for "Sí se puede" with the US Trademark Office, lawyers for the United Farm Workers defended the phrase as the intellectual property of the UFW. After litigation, AeroMexico agreed not to use the phrase and abandoned its trademark application.
