= We Can Do It (Carboo song) =

Single by Carboo
- Released: 2000
- Genre: Rock; pop
- Label: Reactive
- Songwriter(s): Harold Clayton; Abdullah Sigidi; Martin Carboo

"We Can Do It" is a song by Carboo released in 2000. It contains elements from "Take Your Time (Do It Right)" by American R&B group The S.O.S. Band, written by Harold Clayton and Abdullah Sigidi. The song features a male rapping the verses and a female singing the chorus.

== Track listing ==
1. "We Can Do It" (Radio Edit)
2. "We Can Do It" (Original Version)
3. "We Can Do It" (Pinocchio Remix Radio Edit)
4. "We Can Do It" (Pinocchio Remix Original Version)
