= Clayton (footballer, born 1989) =

Brazilian footballer

Personal information
- Full name: Clayton Nascimento Meireles
- Date of birth: April 12, 1989 (age 37)
- Place of birth: Cantagalo, Rio de Janeiro, Brazil
- Height: 1.87 m (6 ft 1 1/2 in)
- Position: Centre back

Team information
- Current team: Barra-SC

Senior career*
Years	Team	Apps	(Gls)
2009–2013	Avaí	6	(0)
2009	→ Iguaçu (loan)	0	(0)
2011	→ Marília (loan)	0	(0)
2011	→ Guarani de Palhoça (loan)	0	(0)
2012–2013	→ Brusque (loan)	33	(1)
2014	Brusque	16	(1)
2014	Guarani de Palhoça	0	(0)
2014	Camboriú	10	(0)
2015	Vila Nova	11	(0)
2015–2017	Brusque	38	(5)
2016	→ Marcílio Dias (loan)	8	(0)
2017	América de Natal	6	(0)
2018–2021	Brusque	68	(1)
2018	→ Almirante Barroso (loan)	4	(0)
2021–	Barra-SC	0	(0)
- * Club domestic league appearances and goals as of October 16, 2010 ‡ National team caps and goals as of October 16, 2010

Clayton Nascimento Meireles (born April 12, 1989 in Cantagalo, Rio de Janeiro), better known as Clayton, is a Brazilian footballer who plays as a centre back for Barra-SC.

== Career statistics ==
(Statistics as of October 16, 2010)

Club	Season	State League		Brazilian Série A		Copa do Brasil		Copa Sudamericana		Total	
Club	Season	Apps	Goals	Apps	Goals	Apps	Goals	Apps	Goals	Apps	Goals
Avaí	2010	-	-	1	0	-	-	-	-	1	0
Avaí	2011	2	0	-	-	-	-	-	-	2	0
Total		2	0	1	0	-	-	-	-	3	0

== Honours ==
Hawaii

- Campeonato Catarinense: 2010

Guarani from Palhoça

- Campeonato Catarinense Série B: 2012

Brusque

- Campeonato Catarinense Série B: 2015
