= Clayton Brothers =

American painters (born 1963 & 1967)

Rob Clayton (born 1963 in Dayton, Ohio) and Christian Clayton (born 1967 in Denver, Colorado) are painters based in California.

Both Rob and Christian Clayton hold BFA degrees from the Art Center College of Design in Pasadena, California (1989 and 1991 respectively).

Their work has been exhibited widely throughout America and Europe, and has been featured in several important shows including The Armory Show in New York. In 2004, Rob and Christian Clayton were invited to participate with a solo exhibition in the Art Statements section of Art Basel Miami.

Their work was featured in FUEL TV's Signature Series ID #21. This animated piece also features the music of Daniel Johnston.

== Select solo exhibitions ==
- 2014 "Open to the Public", Mark Moore Gallery, Los Angeles, CA
- 2013 "Clayton Brothers - I'm Ok", Antonio Colombo Arte Contemporanea, Malan, IT
- 2012 "Clayton Brothers: Inside Out", Pasadena Museum of California Art, Pasadena, CA
- 2011 "Clayton Brothers: Inside Out", Pasadena Museum Of Contemporary Art, Pasadena, CA
- 2010 "Clayton Brothers: Inside Out", Madison Museum Of Contemporary Art, Madison, WI
- 2009 "Jumbo Fruit", Patrick Painter Inc, Santa Monica, CA
- 2008 "AS IS", Apama Mackey Gallery, Houston, TX
- 2007 "Patient", F2 Gallery, Beijing, China
- 2006 "Wishy Washy", Bellwether Gallery, New York, NY
- 2004 "Art Statements", Mackey Gallery, Art Basel Miami, FL
- 2003 "Six Foot Eleven", LA Luz de Jesus Gallery, Los Angeles, CA
- 2001 "Green Pastures", LA Luz de Jesus Gallery, Los Angeles, CA
- 1995 "Lucky 13", La Luz de Jesus Gallery, Los Angeles, CA

== Select group exhibitions ==
- 2018 "Black Mirror: Art as a Social Satire", Saatchi Gallery, London, UK
- 2017 "Abstract Figurative Portrait Painters", Mirus Gallery, San Francisco, CA; "The Clayton Brothers: Your Most Special Day - A Painting Survey", ARTSY, Mark Moore Fine Art, Culver City, CA
- 2016 "MOAH 30th Anniversary Acquisitions Exhibition", Museum of Art History, Lancaster, CA; "Skateborts", Curated by Robert Hak and Jürgen Knubben, FORUM KUNST, Rottweil Germany
- 2015 "Golden State", Bunsen Goetz Galerie, Nuremberg Germany; "Damn Everything But the Circus, honoring the legacy of artist Sister Corita Kent", PMCA, Pasadena, CA; "Pulse Art Fair", Antonio Colombo Art Contemporanea, Milan, Italy, Miami, FL; "MANIFEST: JUSTICE", Sons & Brothers and Arts for Amnesty, Los Angeles, CA; "Artefiera Bologna", Antonio Colombo Art Contemporanea, Bologna, Italia; "???: AHAF Seoul", Keumsan Gallery, Seoul Korea; "The Duck Show in LA", Minotaur Projects, Los Angeles, CA; "Incognito", Santa Monica Museum of Art, Santa Monica, CA; "In Bloom", Mark Moore Gallery, Culver City, CA; "Clayton Brothers Studio Lecture Series and Workshop", Fashion Institute of Technology, La Crescenta, CA
- 2014 "Miami Projects", Miami, FL. Mark Moore Gallery; "Artissimo Art Fair", Milan, IT. Antonio Colombo Arte Contemporanea; "The Cat Art Show", Sloan Gallery, Los Angeles, CA; "Dime Bag 4", Curated by Jordin Isip, The End is Near Gallery, Brooklyn, NY
- 2008 "In the Land of Retinal Delights", Laguna Art Museum, Laguna Beach, CA
