= Clayton =

Clayton may refer to:

== People and fictional characters ==
- Clayton (name), a list of people and fictional characters with the surname or given name
- Clayton baronets
- The Clayton Brothers, Jeff and John, jazz musicians
- Clayton Brothers, Rob and Christian, painter artists

== Places ==
=== Canada ===
- Clayton, Ontario
- Rural Municipality of Clayton No. 333, Saskatchewan

=== Australia ===
- Clayton, Victoria
  - Clayton railway station, Melbourne
- Clayton Bay, a town in South Australia formerly known as Clayton
- Electoral district of Clayton, a former electoral district in Victoria

=== United Kingdom ===
- Clayton, Manchester
- Clayton, South Yorkshire
- Clayton, Staffordshire, in Newcastle-under-Lyme
- Clayton, West Sussex
- Clayton, West Yorkshire
- Clayton-le-Dale, Lancashire
- Clayton-le-Moors, Lancashire
- Clayton-le-Woods, Lancashire

=== United States ===
- Clayton, Alabama
- Clay County, Arkansas, formerly "Clayton County"
- Clayton, California, in Contra Costa County
- Clayton, Delaware
- Clayton, Georgia, a city in Rabun County
- Clayton County, Georgia
- Clayton, Idaho
- Clayton, Illinois
- Clayton, Indiana
- Clayton County, Iowa
  - Clayton, Iowa, a city
- Clayton, Kansas
- Clayton, Louisiana
- Clayton, Maryland
- Clayton, Massachusetts
- Clayton, Michigan, a village in Lenawee County
- Clayton Township, Arenac County, Michigan
- Clayton Township, Genesee County, Michigan
- Clayton, Minnesota, in Faribault County
- Clayton Township, Mower County, Minnesota
- Clayton, Mississippi
- Clayton, Missouri
- Clayton, New Jersey
- Clayton, New Mexico
- Clayton (town), New York
- Clayton (village), New York
- Clayton, North Carolina
- Clayton, Ohio
- Clayton, Oklahoma
- Clayton, Pennsylvania
- Clayton, South Dakota
- Clayton, Texas
- Clayton, Washington
- Clayton, West Virginia
- Clayton, Wisconsin (disambiguation), multiple locations

== Companies ==
- Clayton Aniline Company, a British chemical company
- Clayton Equipment Company, a British engineering company
- Clayton, Dubilier & Rice, a private investment firm
- Clayton & Shuttleworth, a British engineering company

== Schools ==
- Clayton State University, an accredited, reputable university in Georgia, US
- Clayton College of Natural Health, a non-accredited distance-learning college in Alabama, US
- Clayton High School (disambiguation)
- Claytons Primary School, Bourne End, Buckinghamshire, England, UK

== Other uses ==
- Clayton (software), a Wayland compositor using the Clutter toolkit
- "Clayton", Pittsburgh, Pennsylvania, USA; the main structure of Frick Art & Historical Center
- Clayton Congregational Church, later Clayton Wesley Uniting Church, a church building in Adelaide, South Australia
- Clayton Peak, a mountain in Utah, USA
- Claytons, a non-alcoholic drink, formerly "Clayton Bros."
- British Rail Class 17, a class of Diesel locomotive nicknamed "Claytons"

== See also ==
- Brothers Clayton (disambiguation)
- Clayton's case, a legal precedent
- Claydon (disambiguation)
- Claytonville (disambiguation)
- Claiton (disambiguation)
- Cleyton (disambiguation)
